= Saka no Ue no Kumo Museum =

Museum in Matsuyama, Japan

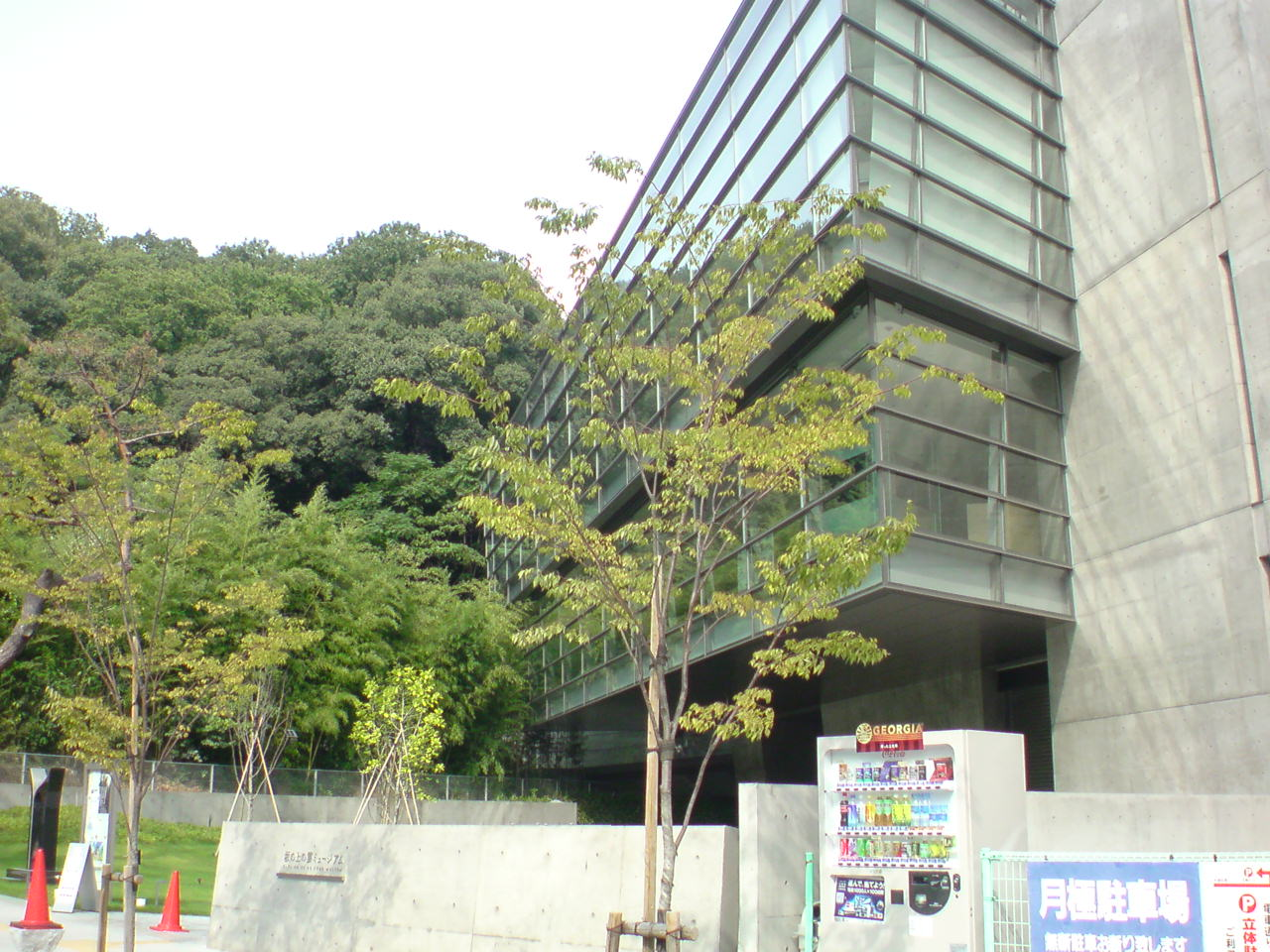

- Saka no Ue no Kumo Museum location in Matsuyama, Japan
- Established: 2007
- Location: 3-20 Ichibancho, Matsuyama, Ehime, Japan
- Coordinates: 33°50′30.38″N 132°46′9.15″E
- Director: Masatake Matsubara
- Website: Saka no Ue no Kumo Museum

Saka no Ue no Kumo Museum or Sakano-ueno-kumo Museum (坂の上の雲ミュージアム, Saka-no-ue-no-kumo Myūjiamu) is a museum located in Matsuyama, Ehime Prefecture, Japan, and inspired by the novel Saka no ue no kumo, written by Ryōtarō Shiba.

The museum was constructed by Tadao Ando. He is also known for the construction of Ryōtarō Shiba Memorial Museum.

== History ==
In the designing process, Tadao Ando managed to represent the powerful thought of the times of people in the Meiji Era, like Shiki Masaoka, Yoshifuru Akiyama, Saneyuki Akiyama, and more. The museum was designed to be appreciated as a touring circuit-style garden. Construction work of the museum started on December 22, 2004. It was finished on November 30, 2006. Then, on April 28, 2007, Saka no ue no kumo Museum opened.
