= Ehime Prefectural Matsuyama Higashi High School =

Coordinates: 33°50′32″N 132°46′48″E

Matsuyama Higashi High School
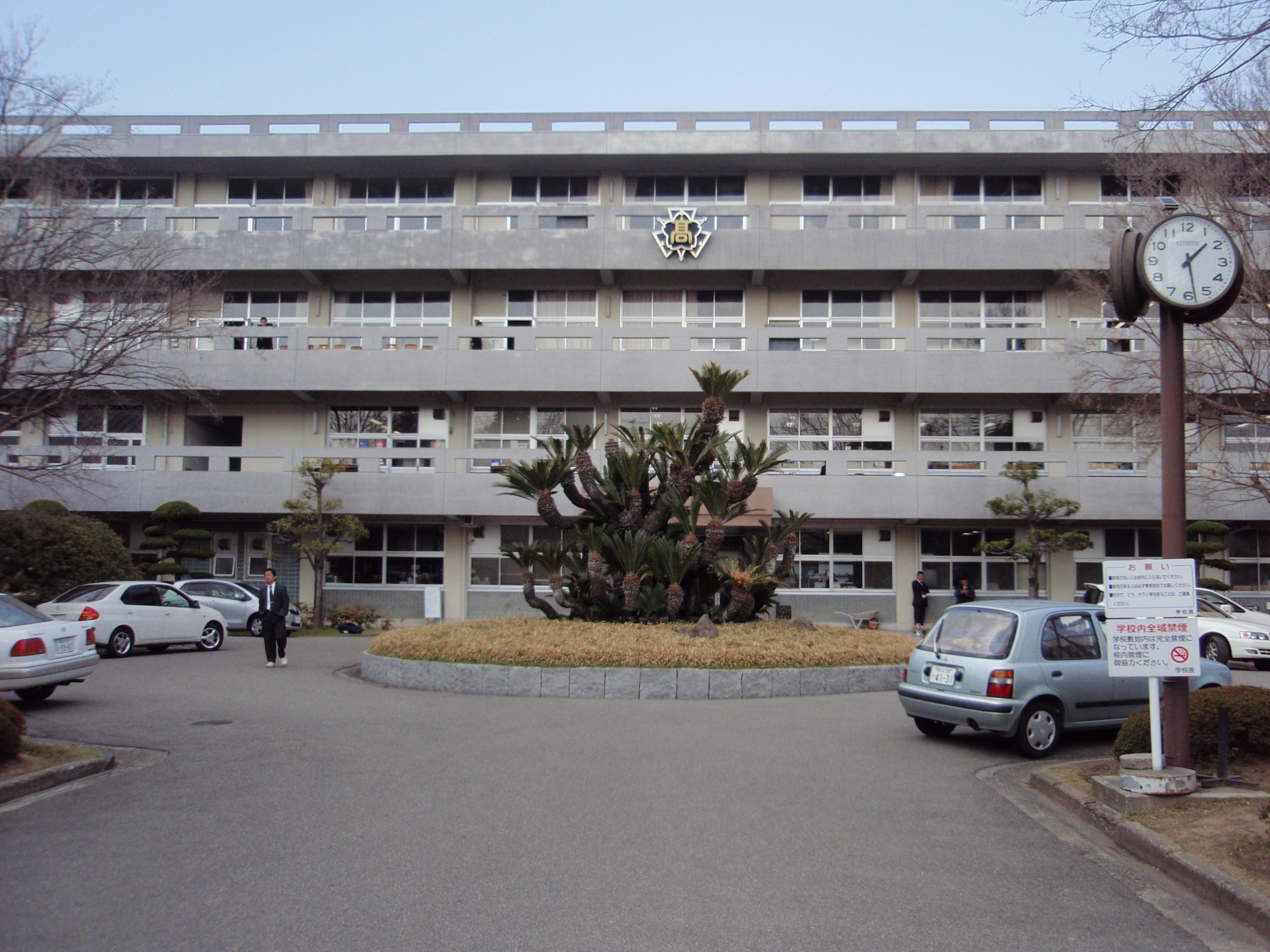
- Matsuyama, Ehime; Japan

Information
- Type: Public
- Established: 1878 (Matsuyama Middle School)
- Website: http://matsuyamahigashi-h.esnet.ed.jp/cms/

Ehime Prefectural Matsuyama Higashi High School (愛媛県立松山東高等学校, Ehime Kenritsu Matsuyama Higashi Kōtōgakkō) is a Japanese high school in Matsuyama, Ehime founded in 1878 as Matsuyama Middle School.

== History ==
The high school was founded as Matsuyama Middle School in 1878. Although the school was founded during the Meiji period, it has earlier roots in the Iyo-Matsuyama Domain's Han school, Kōtokukan, Shūraikan and Meikyōkan.

Among the first students at the new school was Masaoka Tsunenori, later known as Masaoka Shiki. As Seishi Shinoda and Sanford Goldstein explain,

In the 1870s and 1880s, the democratic movement was at its height, and one of its chief leaders was Taisuke Itagaki (1837-1919) from Kochi Prefecture... The prefectural governor of Ehime and the principal of Shiki's school. Though the principal had to resign in the summer of 1879 because of his radical views, his influence remained strong at Matsuyama Middle School. For some years after his departure, democratic thought reigned at the school; yet after the principal's departure many students left, and their numbers decreased from 213 in 1879 to 102 in 1881. Among those strongly influenced by the former principal was Shiki. He neglected most of his schoolwork, so caught up was he in the excitement of making political speeches night after night with ten or so of his classmates.

Undoubtedly the most famous teacher at Matsuyama Middle School was Natsume Kinnosuke, better known as Natsume Sōseki, who arrived in 1895 and taught for only a year, but later memorialized the experience in one of Japan's most popular novels, Botchan (1906). Botchan describes the comically unfortunate experiences of a young teacher fresh from Tokyo (called, euphemistically, "Botchan" or "little master") as he attempts, with little enthusiasm or success, to adapt to the academic regime and the local culture. In the novel, Botchan's colleagues are given comical names such as Tanuki (Japanese raccoon dog), Akashatsu (Red-shirt), etc., prompting continued speculation as to which of Sōseki's fellow teachers might have been their real-life models.

The school name was changed to the present one in 1949.

== Notable students and teachers ==
- Akiyama Saneyuki
- Akiyama Yoshifuru
- Juzo Itami
- Mansaku Itami
- Masanobu Fukuoka
- Noburu Katagami
- Yoshiyuki Kawashima
- Masaoka Shiki
- Natsume Sōseki
- Hisui Sugiura
- Kyoshi Takahama
- Moritake Tanabe
- Kenzaburō Ōe
- Masataka Ogawa
- Ryūtarō Ōtomo
- Satsuo Yamamoto
