= Matsuyama Declaration =

The Matsuyama Declaration was announced in September 1999, reviewing the prospect of world haiku in the 21st century, and the shape that the haiku must then take. The declaration was first drafted by the Coordination Council of Matsuyama (headed by Gania Nishimura) in Matsuyama, Ehime on July 18, 1999. The declaration was officially announced at the Shimanami Kaido 99 International Haiku Convention on September 12, 1999. The proceeding of the convention was covered live on the internet to the entire world by the Shiki team in the Matsuyama Information Handling Chamber, and was also broadcast on BS Forum “Declaration of Haiku Innovation” on October 2, 1999.

“The Matsuyama Declaration: An Annotated Analysis,” by Michael Dylan Welch, appeared on the Graceguts website in 2016, offering detailed responses and analysis of the document’s points of view as a road-map for international haiku in the 21st century.

== Contents ==
The Matsuyama Declaration consists of the following 7 parts:

- 1. Matsuyama - The Place
- 2. The Spread of Haiku Throughout the World
- 3. Why Did Haiku Spread Throughout the World? The Heart of Haiku
- 4. The Problems of Teikei (fixed form) and Kigo (season words)
- 5. The "Shadows" and "Echoes" in the Works of the Leading Poets of the World
- 6. Trends Toward Internationalization, Universalization and Localization of Haiku
- 7. Let's Give Poetry Back to the People / A World Poetry Revolution in the 21st Century

== Composers ==
The Matsuyama Declaration was made by the following people:

- Akito Arima, former Minister of Education of Japan
- Toru Haga, president of Kyoto University of Art and Design
- Makoto Ueda, professor emeritus of Stanford University
- Sakon Soh, poet
- Tohta Kaneko, president of the Modern Haiku Society
- Jean-Jacques Origas, French Oriental Language Research Institute

== See also ==
- Masaoka Shiki International Haiku Awards
