= Ōtemachi Station =

Ōtemachi Station is the name of two train stations in Japan.

- Ōtemachi Station (Ehime) - (大手町駅) in Matsuyama, Ehime Prefecture
- Ōtemachi Station (Tokyo) - (大手町駅) in Tokyo
