= Yukichi Amano =

Japanese columnist and editor (1933–2013)

- 天野 祐吉
- Born: 27 April 1933; Adachi, Tokyo, Japan
- Died: October 20, 2013 (aged 80); Tokyo, Japan
- Education: Meiji Gakuin University
- Known for: Establishing Kokoku Hihyo; Director of the Shiki Memorial Museum

Yukichi Amano (天野 祐吉) (27 April 1933 in Adachi, Tokyo – 20 October 2013 in Tokyo) was a Japanese columnist, founder and chief editor of monthly magazine Kokoku Hihyo.

Amano attended Meiji Gakuin University but did not graduate.

In 1970 he established Madra Publishing Ltd.

In 1979 he established Kokoku Hihyo, a magazine that was discontinued in 2009.

In 2002 he became Director (later Honorary Director) of the Shiki Memorial Museum.

== Awards ==
- NHK Broadcasting Culture Award (2005)
