= Saka no Ue no Kumo (TV series) =

Japanese war drama television series

- Titling by Ryōtarō Shiba
- Written by: Hisashi Nozawa; Takeshi Shibata; Mikio Satō
- Directed by: Takeshi Shibata; Mikio Satō; Taku Katō
- Starring: Masahiro Motoki; Hiroshi Abe; Teruyuki Kagawa; Miho Kanno; Satomi Ishihara; Takako Matsu; Mieko Harada; Yukiyoshi Ozawa; Takahiro Fujimoto; Koji Matoba; Masaya Kato; Shinya Owada; Onoe Kikunosuke V Tsurutaro Kataoka; Shirō Sano; Takaaki Enoki; Akira Takarada; Jun Kunimura; Ren Osugi; Masao Kusakari; Kyōko Maya; Masakane Yonekura; Akira Emoto; Keiko Takeshita; Naoto Takenaka; Hiroshi Tachi; Tōru Emori; Kōji Ishizaka; Toshiyuki Nishida; Shirō Itō; Go Kato; Hideki Takahashi; Tetsuya Watari
- Narrated by: Ken Watanabe
- Ending theme: "Stand Alone" by Sarah Brightman
- Composer: Joe Hisaishi
- Country of origin: Japan
- Original language: Japanese
- No. of seasons: 3
- No. of episodes: 13

Production
- Executive producer: Yoshiki Nishimura
- Producers: Yasuhiro Suga; Koichi Fujisawa
- Running time: approx. 90 min.

Original release
- Network: NHK
- Release: November 29, 2009 – December 2011

Saka no Ue no Kumo (坂の上の雲; lit. 'Clouds Over the Hills') is a Japanese war drama television series which was aired on NHK over three years, from November 29, 2009, to December 2011, as a special taiga drama. The series runs 13 episodes at 90 minutes each. The first season, with 5 episodes, was broadcast in 2009, while seasons two and three, each with 4 episodes, were broadcast in late 2010 and 2011. While most episodes were shot in Japan, one of the episodes in season two was shot in Latvia. The TV series is based on the 1968 novel of the same name by Ryōtarō Shiba and adapted by Hisashi Nozawa.

Executive producer Yoshiko Nishimura acquired the rights to the novel from Shiba's widow Midori Fukuda in 2001, after decades of the author refusing to let anyone adapt his controversial work for the screen. The NHK officially announced their intention to adapt the novel in 2003, though shooting would only begin in 2008. The series is the first taiga drama to be mainly set during the Meiji era, thus its production encountered more difficulties than usual in achieving an accurate depiction of its setting. It is now the most expensive taiga drama ever produced.

The theme song of the drama series is titled "Stand Alone". It was composed by Joe Hisaishi, written by Kundō Koyama, and performed by British soprano singer Sarah Brightman.

== Production ==
Production credits

- Based on the novel by – Ryōtarō Shiba
- Script – Hisashi Nozawa
- Music – Joe Hisaishi
- Titling – Ryōtarō Shiba
- Historical research – Yasushi Toriumi
- Narrator – Ken Watanabe
- Production coordinator – Yasuhiro Kan
- Casting – Mineyo Satō

=== Development ===
During the 1970s, executive producer Yoshiko Nishimura read the 1968 novel Saka no Ue no Kumo by Ryōtarō Shiba when he was a student at the University of Tokyo. Though he dreamt of what the novel would look like on screen, his seniors at the NHK drama department thought that adapting the work was inconceivable; Shiba continuously refused throughout his life to let anyone adapt his controversial work for the screen.

By the 1990s, Nishimura would travel to Hollywood to study filmmaking, gaining inspiration to mount an epic narrative on television that would elevate the status of the medium in Japan, which was considered by people to be inferior to cinema. In 2000, Nishimura visited Shiba's widow Midori Fukuda to give his condolences, and presented to her his argument for a television adaptation of Shiba's novel: that it would encourage young people to read the novel after seeing the story onscreen. After a year of deliberation, Fukuda relented and provided Nishimura with the novel's adaptation rights. The NHK would officially announce their intention to adapt the novel as a taiga drama by 2003.

=== Writing and filming ===
Preparations for Saka no Ue no Kumo took three times as long as a regular NHK taiga drama. The series was originally scheduled to begin its broadcast by 2006, but the suicide of writer Hisashi Nozawa in 2004 lead to the postponement of production. The usual taiga drama production would first have one-third of the total number of scripts finished before shooting, with audience reception taken into account as the rest of the series is written; Saka no Ue no Kumo only began shooting in 2008 once all 13 ninety-minute scripts were finished.

The Meiji era had never been depicted as the main setting of a taiga drama before, thus the television crew encountered more difficulties than usual in creating the visuals for the era due to a lack of familiar images. Research into the military background of the time especially highlighted the differences between the Meiji military and the Shōwa military; according to Nishimura, no visual image of the Meiji era's military has ever been made that has actually stuck in the Japanese' imaginations, while the Shōwa era has been the default image in their minds.

In adapting the novel for television, the crew addressed the lack of female characters in the original work by including scenes which depicted what the women were doing and thinking about in Japan during both the First Sino-Japanese War and the Russo-Japanese War. For Nishimura, "those scenes are one of the things worth noticing in a special drama like this one."

The series has since become the most expensive taiga drama ever produced by NHK.

== Cast ==
=== Akiyama family ===
- Masahiro Motoki as Akiyama Saneyuki
  - Ren Kobayashi as young Saneyuki
- Hiroshi Abe as Akiyama Yoshifuru
  - Shōta Sometani as young Yoshifuru
- Shirō Itō as Akiyama Hisataka
- Keiko Takeshita as Akiyama Sada
- Takako Matsu as Akiyama Tami

=== Masaoka family ===
- Teruyuki Kagawa as Masaoka Shiki
  - Takato Sasano as young Shiki
- Miho Kanno as Masaoka Ritsu
  - Riko Yoshida as young Ritsu
- Mieko Harada as Masaoka Yae
- Ichiro Shinjitsu as Ōhara Kanzan
- Yūto Uemura as Katō Tsunetada
- Yu Tokui as a police officer Sonoda

=== Navy officials and their family ===
- Takahiro Fujimoto as Takeo Hirose
- Tsurutarō Kataoka as Yashiro Rokurō
- Tetsuya Watari as Tōgō Heihachirō
- Kōji Ishizaka as Yamamoto Gonbei
- Masao Kusakari as Katō Tomosaburō
- Hiroshi Tachi as Shimamura Hayao
- Masaya Kato as Arima Ryokitsu
- Akira Nakao as Hidaka Sōnojō
- Kisuke Iida as Takarabe Takeshi
- Hidekazu Akai as Kantarō Suzuki
- Fubito Yamano as Itō Sukeyuki

=== Army officials and their family ===
- Koji Matoba as Gaishi Nagaoka
- Hideki Takahashi as Kodama Gentarō
- Tōru Emori as Yamagata Aritomo
- Masakane Yonekura as Ōyama Iwao
- Akira Emoto as Nogi Maresuke
- Kyōko Maya as Nogi Shizuko
- Shinya Tsukamoto as Akashi Motojiro
- Jun Kunimura as Kawakami Soroku
- Takehiro Murata as Ijichi Kōsuke
- Takaaki Enoki as Mori Rintarō
- Daijirō Tsutsumi as Iguchi Shōgo
- Atsushi Miyauchi as Fujii Shigeta
- Kōji Shimizu as Kuroki Tamemoto

=== Politicians and their family ===
- Go Kato as Itō Hirobumi
- Toshiyuki Nishida as Takahashi Korekiyo
- Naoto Takenaka as Komura Jutarō
- Ren Ōsugi as Mutsu Munemitsu
- Shinya Owada as Inoue Kaoru
- Takeshi Ōbayashi as Matsukata Masayoshi
- Toshiki Ayata as Katsura Tarō
- Kanta Ogata as Kaneko Kentarō

=== Ordinary people ===
- Shirō Sano as Kuga Katsunan
- Kenzō as Kojima Ichinen
- Yukiyoshi Ozawa as Natsume Sōseki
- Kenji Oka as Tsuda Sanzō

=== Russian Empire ===
- Timofei Fyodorov as Nicholas II
- Valery Barinov as Sergei Witte
- Artem Grigoriev as Boris Vilkitsky
- Marina Aleksandrova as Ariadna Kovalskaya
- Gennadi Vengerov as Yevgeni Ivanovich Alekseyev
- Sergei Parshin as Aleksey Kuropatkin
- Aleksandr Tyutin as Zinovy Rozhestvensky

=== Other countries ===
- Julian Glover as Alfred Thayer Mahan
- Norbert Gort as Jakob Meckel
- Tim Wellard as Prince George of Greece and Denmark
- Leon Lissek as Jacob Schiff
- Ren Dahui as Li Hongzhang
- Xue Yong as Yuan Shikai
- Hsu Wen-Pin as Ding Ruchang
- Blake Crawford as Jones

=== Others ===
- Onoe Kikunosuke V as Emperor Meiji

== Series overview ==
Season	Originally aired	DVD release dates	Discs
Season 1	2009	March 15, 2010	5
Season 2	2010	Spring, 2011	4
Season 3	2011	Spring, 2012	4

=== Season 1 : 1868 - 1900 ===
Season #	Episode #	Title	Directed by	Rating	Original airdate
1	1	"Shōnen no Kuni" (少年の国) (Country of Youth)	Takeshi Shibata	17.7%	November 29, 2009
2	2	"Seiun" (青雲) (High Ambition)	Takeshi Shibata	19.6%	December 6, 2009
3	3	"Kokka Meidō" (国家鳴動) (Rumbling of the Nation)	Takeshi Shibata	19.5%	December 13, 2009
4	4	"Nisshin Kaisen" (日清開戦) (Outbreak of the Japan-Qing War)	Takeshi Shibata	17.8%	December 20, 2009
5	5	"Ryūgakusei" (留学生) (The Exchange Student)	Ryūji Isshiki	12.9%	December 27, 2009

=== Season 2 : 1900 - 1904 ===
Season #	Episode #	Title	Directed by	Rating	Original airdate
1	6	"Nichiei Dōmei" (日英同盟) (The Japan-Britain Alliance)	Mikio Satō	14.7%	December 5, 2010
2	7	"Shiki, Yuku" (子規、逝く) (The Passing of Shiki)	Mikio Satō	15.0%	December 12, 2010
3	8	"Nichiro Kaisen" (日露開戦) (Outbreak of the Japan-Russia War)	Takafumi Kimura	14.7%	December 19, 2010
4	9	"Hirose, Shisu" (広瀬、死す) (The Death of Hirose)	Takafumi Kimura	9.7%	December 26, 2010

=== Season 3 : Russo-Japanese War ===
Season #	Episode #	Title	Directed by	Rating	Original airdate
1	10	"Ryojun Sō Kōgeki" (旅順総攻撃) (General Assault on Ryojun)	Taku Kato	12.7%	December 2011
2	11	"203 Kōchi" (二〇三高地) (Hill 203)	Taku Kato	11.0%	December 2011
3	12	"Tekikan Miyu" (敵艦見ゆ) (Enemy Vessels Sighted)	Takafumi Kimura	11.1%	December 2011
4	13	"Nihon Kai Kaisen" (日本海海戦) (The Battle of the Sea of Japan)	Taku Kato	11.4%	December 2011

- Rating is based on Japanese video research(Kantō region).

== Soundtrack and books ==
=== Soundtrack ===
- "Saka no Ue no Kumo" Original Soundtrack (December 18, 2009) EMI Music Japan

=== Books ===
- NHK Special Drama, Historical Handbook, Saka no Ue no Kumo (October 30, 2009) ISBN 978-4-14-910729-5
- NHK Special Drama Guide, Saka no Ue no Kumo Part 1 (October 30, 2009) ISBN 978-4-14-407160-7
- NHK Special Drama Guide, Saka no Ue no Kumo Part 2 (October 25, 2010) ISBN 978-4-14-407173-7

== Accolades ==
Year	Award	Result
2010	International Emmy Award for Best Drama Series	Nominated
2011	International Emmy Award for Best Drama Series	Nominated
