= Gania Nishimura =

Japanese writer

Gania Nishimura (西村我尼吾, Nishimura Gania; born April 16, 1952 in Osaka Prefecture, real name Hidetoshi Nishimura) is a Japanese poet and an international civil servant.

== Career ==
He graduated from the Faculty of Law, the University of Tokyo. He studied Haiku under Seison Yamaguchi, engaged as a chief editor of Haiku Group called "Genseirin" and a leader of Haiku Group called Hototogisu in the University of Tokyo.

He joined the Ministry of International Trade and Industry in 1976. He received his master's degree from Yale University in 1982. He participated in founding the haiku magazine "Ten'i" as a promoter in 1990. He has assumed numerous positions, including Representative of the Asia-Pacific Region of the Japan Overseas Development Corporation in 1993.

In 1996, he organized "Short Poem International Symposium" in Phuket Province, Thailand. In 1998, he was posted to Ehime Prefecture, Japan. and published an anthology of haiku entitled "Bureaucrat". He participated in the drafting of the Matsuyama Declaration in 1999, and supervised the joint translation.

He was engaged in the establishment of the Masaoka Shiki International Haiku Awards in 2000, the 21st Century Ehime Haiku Prizes in 2002, and the Shiba Fukio Awards for New Haiku Poets, also in 2002. Today, he serves as a consultant for screening committees of these awards and prizes. He established the Asia Cosmopolitan Awards in 2012. He currently works also as president of the Economic Research Institute for ASEAN and East Asia since June 2008 (his title was changed from Executive Director at June 5, 2015) and visiting professor of Waseda University since April 2013 and visiting professor of Universitas Darma Persada since October 2013.
