= Saka no Ue no Kumo =

Japanese historical novel by Shiba Ryōtarō

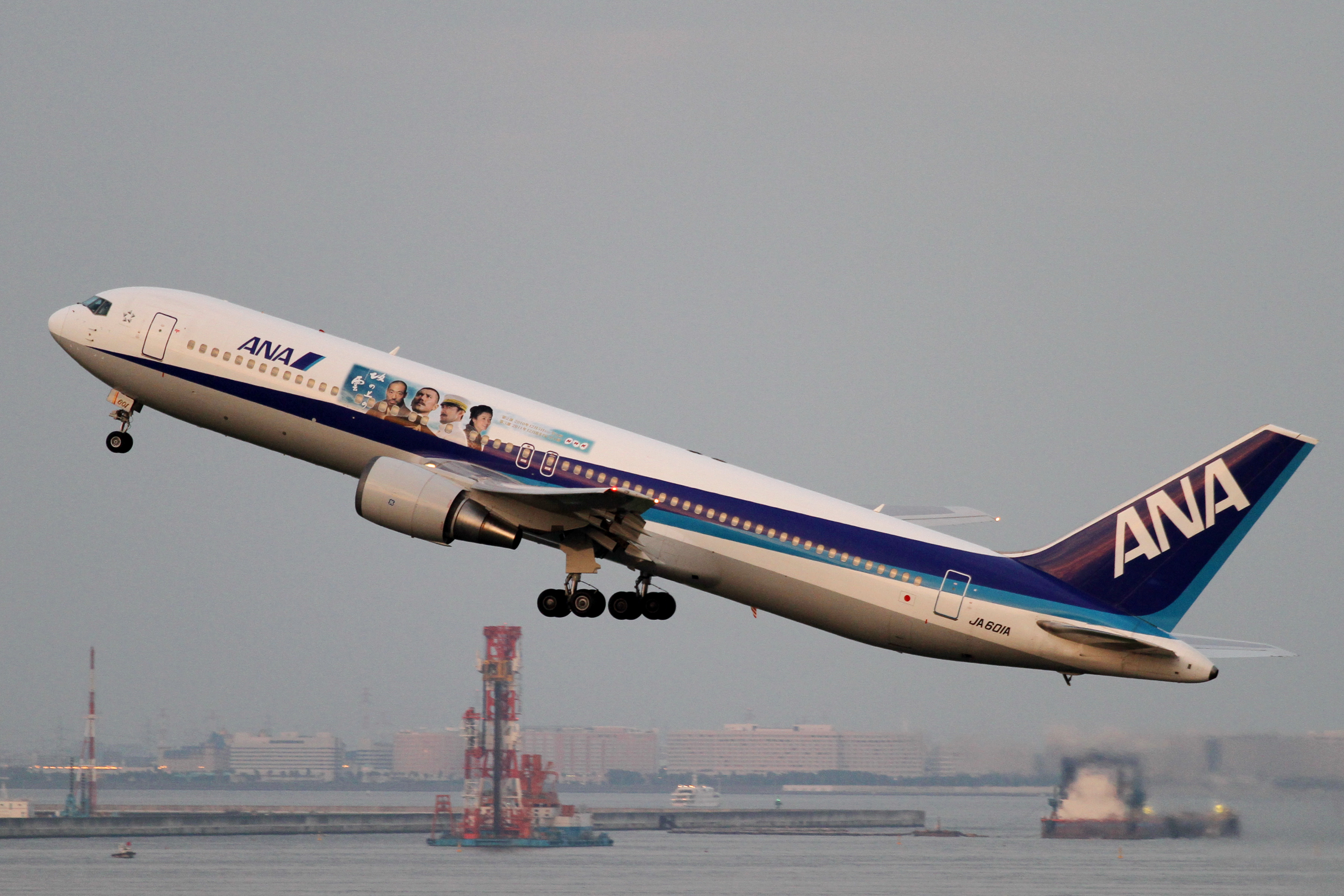
Tokyo International Airport, Boeing 767-381, c/n:27943, All Nippon Airways, "NHK Sakanoueno Kumo" c/s

Saka no Ue no Kumo (坂の上の雲), or "Clouds Above the Hill" is a Japanese historical novel by Shiba Ryōtarō originally published serially from 1968 to 1972 in eight volumes. A three-year NHK television special drama series based on the novel and also entitled Saka no Ue no Kumo was shown in thirteen episodes from 2009 to 2011.

The novel is set in the Meiji period and focuses on three characters from the city of Matsuyama: Akiyama Yoshifuru, his brother Akiyama Saneyuki, and their friend, Masaoka Tsunenori, better known as Masaoka Shiki. The novel follows their lives from childhood through the First Sino-Japanese War, culminating in the Russo-Japanese War of 1904–05.

The city of Matsuyama has a Saka no Ue no Kumo Museum dedicated to the novel and associated TV series.

== English translation ==
An English translation of Saka no Ue no kumo was published in stages by Routledge as Clouds Above the Hill in four volumes. Vol. 1 describes the growth of Japan’s fledgling Meiji state and introduces the main protagonists. Vol. 2 (ISBN 978-113508381-6) describes the early stages of the Russo-Japanese war up to the battle of Liaoyang, where Japan seals a victory which shocks the world. The first halves of both volumes were translated by Paul McCarthy and the latter halves by Juliet Winters Carpenter. Vol. 3 (ISBN 978-113467503-6) contains the middle stages of the war and was translated by Carpenter. Vol. 4 (ISBN 978-113467930-0) contains the battle at Mukden and the naval showdown in the Tsushima strait, resulting in the destruction of the Russia’s Baltic Fleet and the triumphant return to Yokohama of the Japanese fleet. Vol. 4 was translated by Andrew Cobbing. A set containing all four volumes (ISBN 1138911968) was released in 2014.
