= Origas =

Origas is a French surname. Notable people with the surname include:

- Jean-Jacques Origas (1937–2003), French Japanologist
- Julien Origas (1920–1983), French Rosicrucian
