= Matsuyama Junior College =

Coordinates: 33°51′3.4″N 132°46′7″E

- 松山短期大学
- Type: private
- Established: 1952
- Location: Matsuyama, Ehime, Japan
- Website: https://www.matsuyama-u.ac.jp/juniorcollege/

Matsuyama Junior College (松山短期大学, Matsuyama Tanki Daigaku) is a private junior college in Matsuyama, Ehime, Japan. It was established in 1952, and is now attached to Matsuyama University.

== Departments ==
- Department of Commerce

== See also ==
- List of junior colleges in Japan
