= Jean-Jacques Origas =

French Japanologist

Jean-Jacques Origas (1937–2003) was a French academic with expertise in Japanese literature and art. He was a Japanologist, best known more for giving his knowledge to his students rather than for publishing books.

== Academic career ==
Origas studied Japanese the Sorbonne. He furthered his education at Waseda University in Tokyo; and he taught at the Tokyo University of Foreign Studies.

Origas was a Professor of Japanese at the National Institute of Oriental Languages and Civilizations (Institut national des langues et civilisations orientales or INALCO) in Paris. He became a visiting professor at the International Research Center for Japanese Studies in Kyoto, where he lectured on Haiku in contemporary French poetry (1992). His work on Meiji literature was the subject of a Nichibunken Mokuyo Seminar (1996).

Origas was famed for his expertise in the pedagogy of Japanese language education. He influenced the way Japanese as a foreign language is taught in France. As a teacher, his intention was to impart not only the ability to write grammatically correct Japanese, but also to use the language in a way which is stylistically pleasing.

He was also president of the Centre d'Etudes Japonaises d'Alsace (CEJA). and member of composers of Matsuyama Declaration.

=== Selected work ===
- Origas, Jean-Jacques. (2000). Dictionnaire de littérature japonaise. Paris: Presses Universitaires de France. ISBN 978-2-13-050441-2 (paper)
- ____________. "Japanese-Language Education in France:Present and Future." Current report on Japanese-language education around the globe, Japan Foundation. Vol. 1, pp. 173–176.
- Didier, Béatrice. (1994). Dictionnaire universel des littératures ("Notices sur la revue Hototogisu, les écrivains Nagatsuka Takashi [1879-1915] et Takahama Kyoshi [1874-1959]" -- section littérature japonaise sous la direction de Jean-Jacques Origas). Paris: Presses Universitaires de France. ISBN 2-13-043013-9
- de Touchet, Elizabeth. (2003). Quand les Français armaient le Japon: la création de l'arsenal de Yokosuka, 1865-1882 (Préface de Jean-Jacques Origas). Rennes: Presses universitaires de Rennes. ISBN 2-86847-705-4
- Jean-Jacques Origas, (2008). La Lampe d'Akutagawa. Essais sur la littérature japonaise moderne, (présenté par Emmanuel Lozerand et Christophe Marquet), Paris, Les Belles Lettres, coll. "Japon" octobre 2008, ISBN 978-2-251-72201-6, 35 €

=== Honors ===
- Order of the Sacred Treasure with Gold Rays, 1998 .
- Japan Foundation: Special Prize, 1988.

== See also ==
- Matsuyama Declaration
- Masaoka Shiki International Haiku Awards
