= Rakuzan ware (Ehime) =

Japanese pottery style

Rakuzan ware (楽山焼 (愛媛県), Rakuzan-yaki) is a type of Japanese pottery traditionally made in Matsuyama, Ehime prefecture.

A little red-clawed crab (赤手蟹 akategani) peeking out of the sides of the vessel is the trademark.
