= Kokoku Hihyo =

Japanese monthly trade magazine (1979–2009)

- Editor-in-chief: Yukichi Amano
- Categories: Trade magazine
- Frequency: Monthly
- Publisher: Madra Publishing
- Founded: 1979
- Final issue: April 2009
- Country: Japan
- Based in: Tokyo
- Language: Japanese
- ISSN: 0388-4937
- OCLC: 28476007

Kokoku Hihyo (広告批評, Kōkoku Hihyō; lit. advertisement criticism) was a leading Japanese monthly trade magazine focusing on advertisement, especially TV commercials. It was published between 1979 and 2009.

== History and profile ==
Kokoku Hihyo was started by Yukichi Amano in 1979. It was modeled on Creativity Magazine.

Kokoku Hihyo was published monthly by Madra Publishing. It offered news about new trends in advertising, creativity and new media. Amano also served as the editor-in-chief of the magazine.

On 9 April 2008 Kokoku Hihyo announced that it would be shut down in April 2009. The founder and editor-in-chief Amano stated that the magazine closed down due to the fact that the Internet age made advertising totally different phenomenon.
