= Baishinji Station =

Railway station in Matsuyama, Ehime Prefecture, Japan

Baishinji Station 梅津寺駅
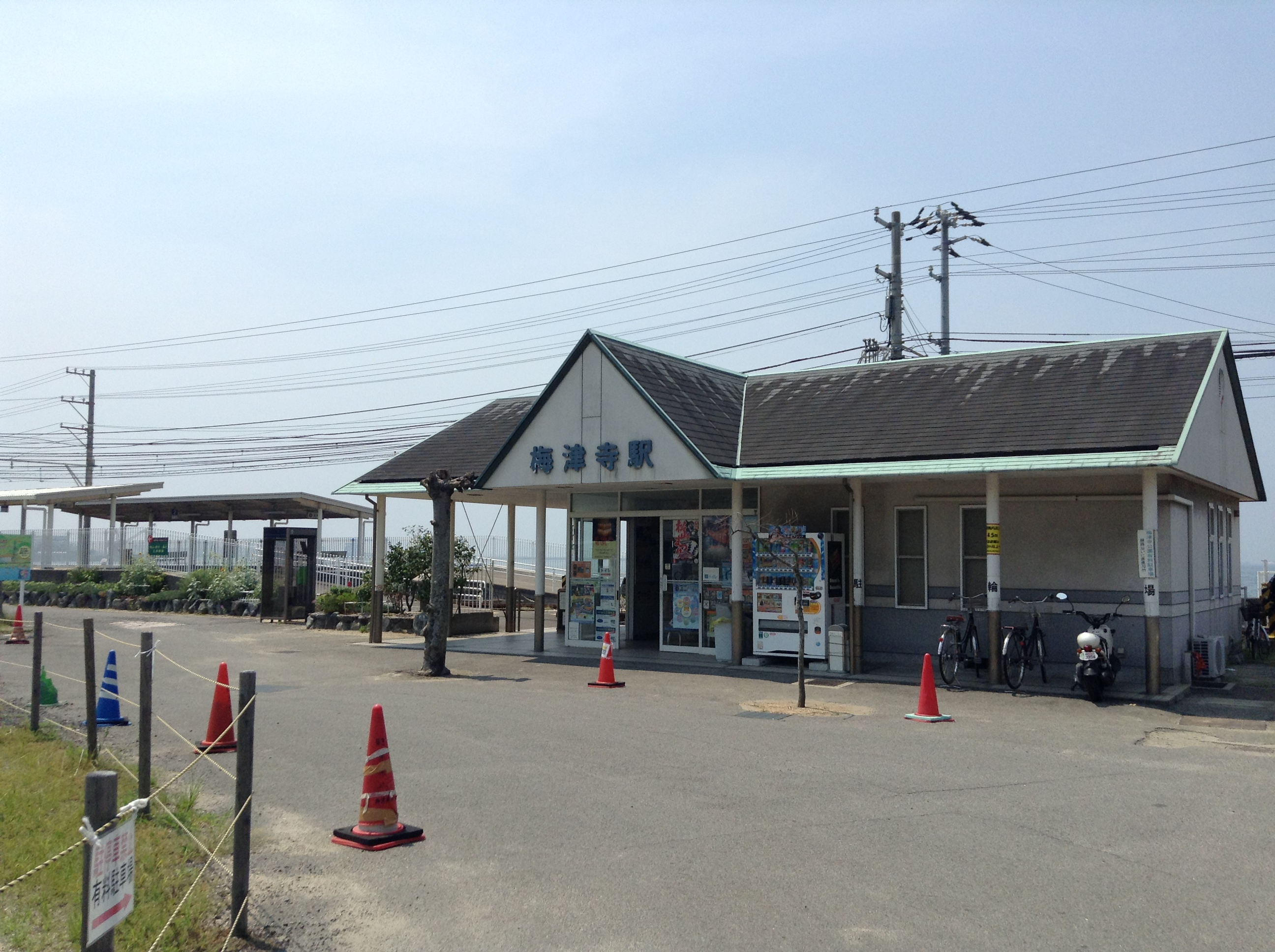
- Baishinji Station entrance, August 2013

General information
- Location: Baishinjimachi, Matsuyama City, Ehime Prefecture 791-8082; Japan
- Coordinates: 33.8750°N 132.7075°E
- Operator: Iyotetsu
- Line: Takahama Line
- Distance: 1.2 km (0.75 mi) from Takahama
- Platforms: 2 side platforms
- Tracks: 2

Construction
- Structure type: At grade

Other information
- Station code: IY02

History
- Opened: 6 July 1899; 127 years ago

Passengers
- FY2021: 337

Services
Preceding station	Iyotetsu	Following station
Takahama Terminus	Takahama Line	Minatoyama towards Matsuyama City
Location
- Location within Ehime Prefecture Location within Japan

Baishinji Station (梅津寺駅, Baishinji-eki) is a passenger railway station located in the city of Matsuyama, Ehime Prefecture, Japan. It is operated by the private transportation company Iyotetsu.

== Lines ==
The station is a station on the Takahama Line and is located 1.2 km from the opposing terminus of the line at Takahama. During most of the day, railway trains arrive every fifteen minutes. Trains continue from Matsuyama City Station on the Yokogawara Line to Yokogawara Station.

== Layout ==
Baishinji Station is an above-ground station with two opposed side platforms and two tracks, and is unstaffed. Behind Platform 2 is the coast. Platform 1 is the up/down main line, and Platform 2 is the down main line. This is to allow trains bound for Takahama to enter Platform 1 in the event that platform 2 is hit by high waves during abnormal weather. The double-track section from Matsuyama-shi Station ends at this station, and the section to Takahama Station, the terminal station, is a single track.

== History ==
Baishinji Station was opened on 6 July 1899 as a temporary stop, and was elevated to full station status on 1 May 1931. The station was one of the filming locations for a TV show in 1991, where the couple broke up at the station platform due to missing each other by a single train.

== Surrounding area ==
- Baishinji Park

== See also ==
- List of railway stations in Japan
