= Matsuyama =

Matsuyama 松山市
- Prefecture capital and Core city
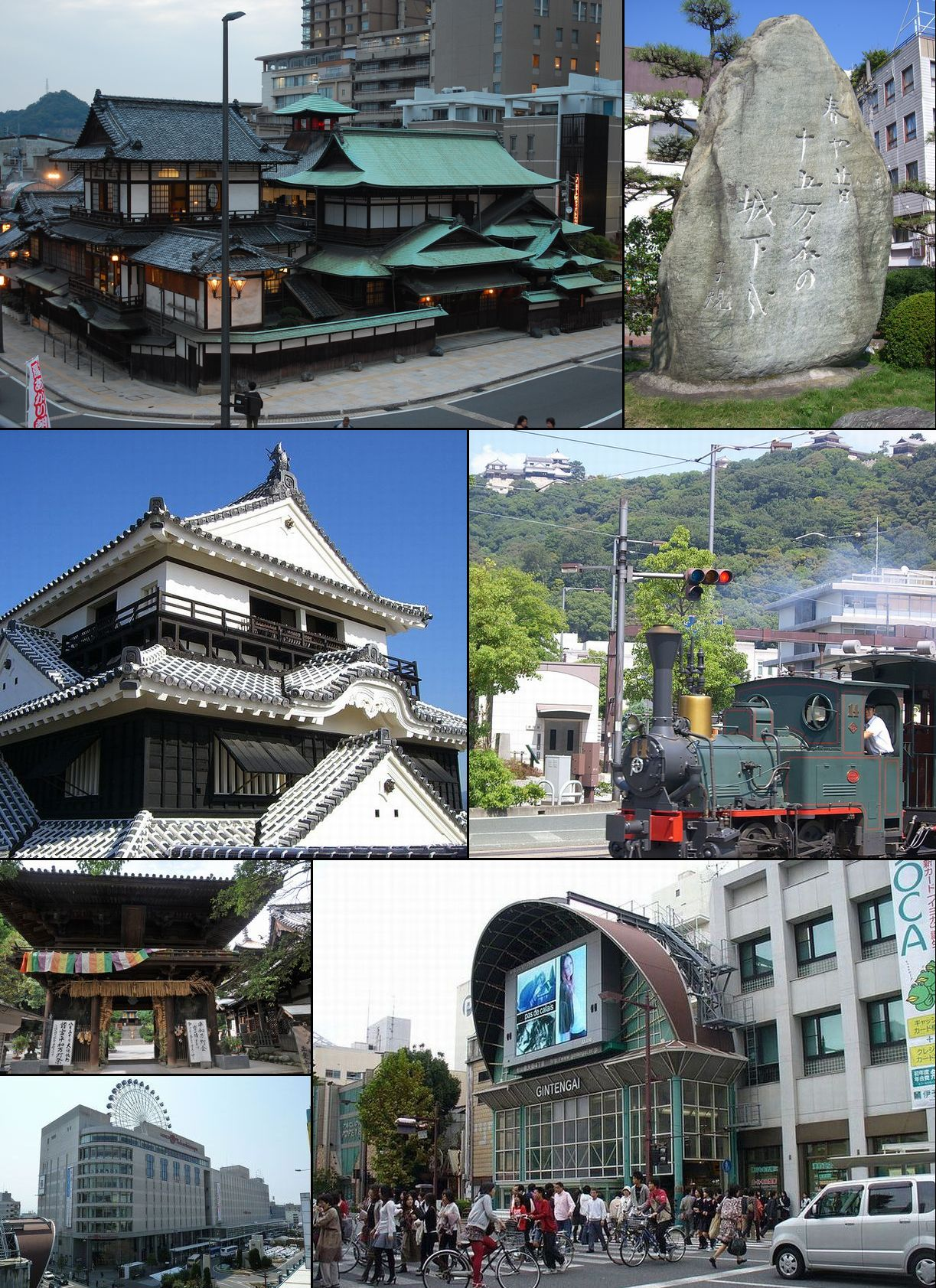
- From top left: Dōgo Onsen Honkan, Stone monument of Shiki Masaoka, Matsuyama Castle, Botchan train, The gate of Ishite-ji, Iyotetsu Matsuyama-shi Station, Gintengai Street

- Flag Emblem

- Interactive map of Matsuyama
- Location in Japan
- Coordinates: 33°50′N 132°46′E
- Country: Japan
- Region: Shikoku
- Prefecture: Ehime

Government
  - Mayor: Katsuhito Noshi (since December 2010)

Area
  - Total: 429.35 km^{2} (165.77 sq mi)

Population (2026)
  - Total: 494,100
  - Density: 1,151/km^{2} (2,981/sq mi)
- Time zone: UTC+09:00 (JST)
- City hall address: 4-7-2 Nibanchō, Matsuyama-shi, Ehime-ken 790-8571
- Website: Official website
- Symbols
- Flower: Camellia

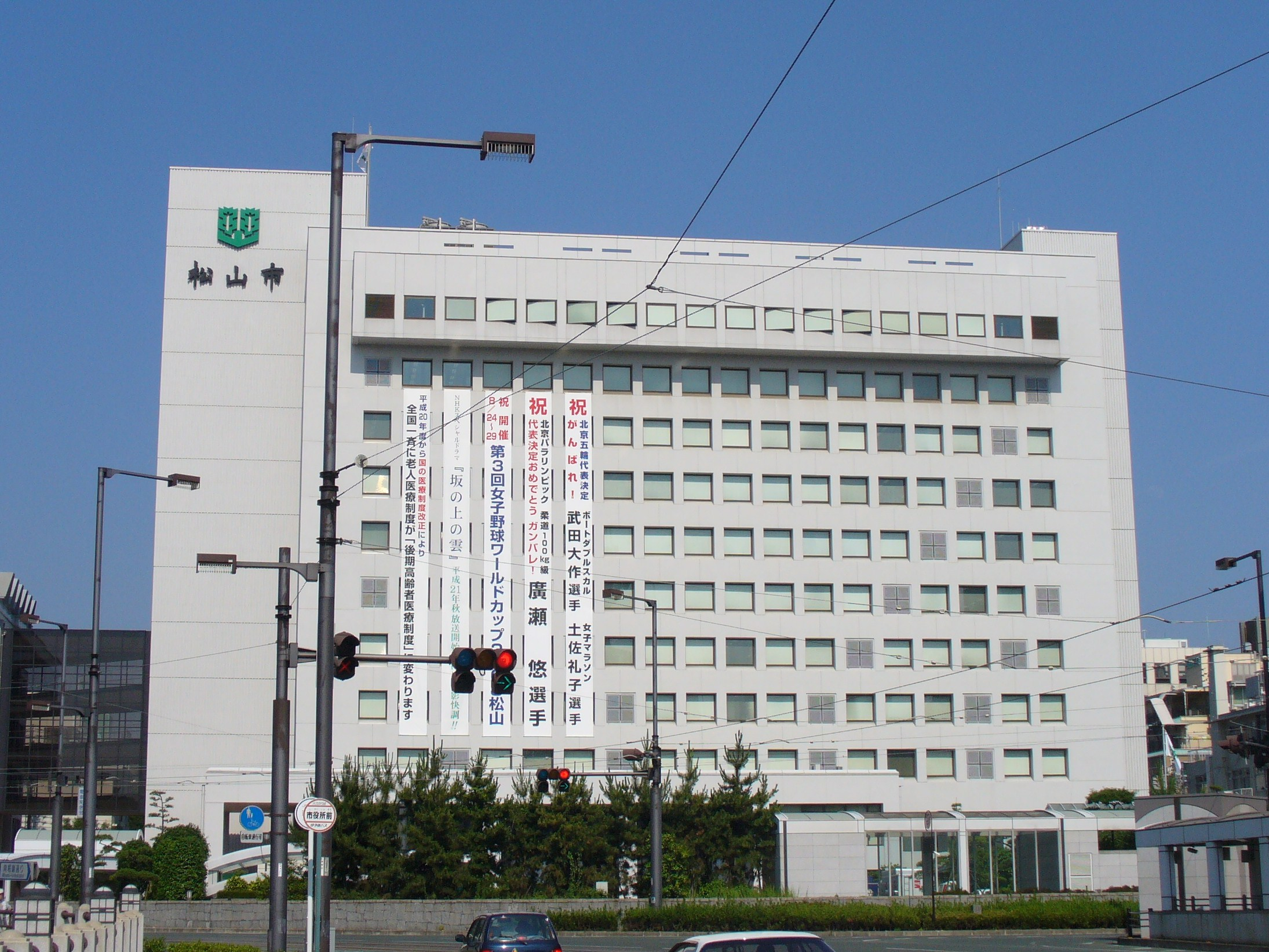
Matsuyama City Hall

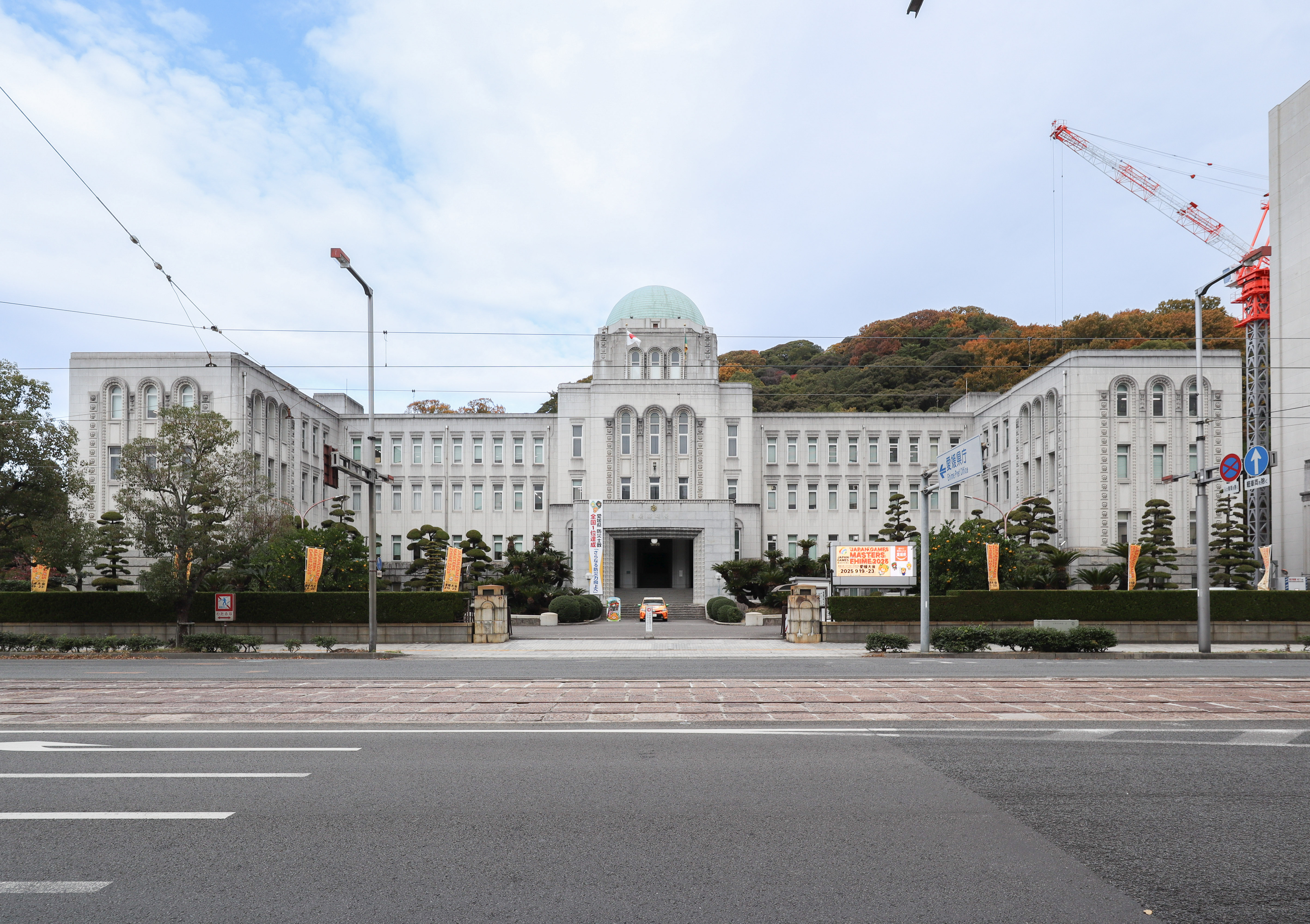
Ehime Prefectural Capital Building

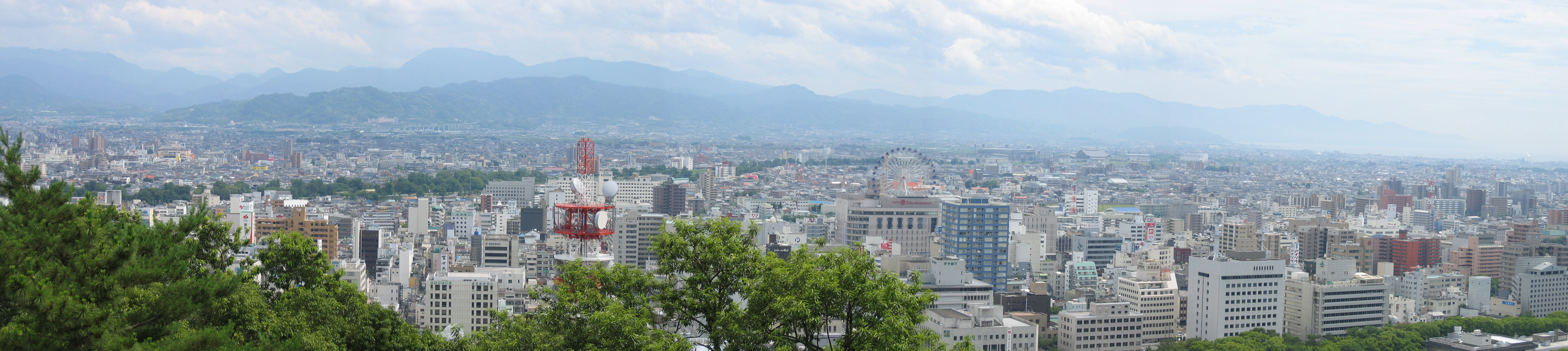
A panoramic view of the city from Matsuyama Castle

Matsuyama (松山市, Matsuyama-shi; Japanese pronunciation: [mä̀.t͡sɨ́.jä̀.mä̀, -jä́.mä́.ɕì] (Note: The placename and family name are only pronounced like this with an accent. The common noun meaning "pine-covered mountain" is pronounced [mä̀.t͡sɨ́.jä́.mä́] without an accent.)) is the capital city of Ehime Prefecture, on the island of Shikoku, in Japan and is also Shikoku's largest city. As of 1 October 2022, the city had an estimated population of 494,100 in 243,541 households and a population density of 1,200 persons per km^{2}. The total area of the city is 429.35 square kilometres (165.77 sq mi).

== Geography ==
Matsuyama is located in central Ehime Prefecture, facing the Seto Inland Sea to the north, the mountains of the Takanawa Peninsula to the north and east, and the Saragamine Mountain Range, an extension of the Shikoku Mountains, to the south. It is located on the northeastern portion of the Dōgo Plain. The city also includes the Kutsuna Islands, an archipelago of 29 islands in the Seto Inland Sea.

=== Neighbouring municipalities ===
Ehime Prefecture

- Imabari
- Kumakōgen
- Masaki
- Tobe
- Tōon

=== Climate ===
Matsuyama has a humid subtropical climate (Köppen climate classification Cfa; Trewartha climate classification Cf) with hot summers and cool winters. Precipitation is significant throughout the year, and is heavier from April to July as well as in September.

Climate data for Matsuyama (1991−2020 normals, extremes 1890−present)
Month	Jan	Feb	Mar	Apr	May	Jun	Jul	Aug	Sep	Oct	Nov	Dec	Year
Record high °C (°F)	24.4 (75.9)	24.5 (76.1)	27.5 (81.5)	31.1 (88.0)	32.3 (90.1)	35.6 (96.1)	37.0 (98.6)	37.8 (100.0)	36.7 (98.1)	33.3 (91.9)	28.0 (82.4)	25.2 (77.4)	37.8 (100.0)
Mean maximum °C (°F)	15.3 (59.5)	17.7 (63.9)	21.4 (70.5)	25.9 (78.6)	29.2 (84.6)	32.4 (90.3)	35.1 (95.2)	35.5 (95.9)	33.5 (92.3)	29.0 (84.2)	23.5 (74.3)	18.0 (64.4)	35.8 (96.4)
Mean daily maximum °C (°F)	10.2 (50.4)	11.0 (51.8)	14.4 (57.9)	19.6 (67.3)	24.2 (75.6)	27.0 (80.6)	31.2 (88.2)	32.6 (90.7)	29.1 (84.4)	23.8 (74.8)	18.1 (64.6)	12.6 (54.7)	21.1 (70.0)
Daily mean °C (°F)	6.2 (43.2)	6.8 (44.2)	9.9 (49.8)	14.8 (58.6)	19.4 (66.9)	22.9 (73.2)	27.1 (80.8)	28.1 (82.6)	24.6 (76.3)	19.1 (66.4)	13.6 (56.5)	8.5 (47.3)	16.8 (62.2)
Mean daily minimum °C (°F)	2.6 (36.7)	2.8 (37.0)	5.6 (42.1)	10.3 (50.5)	15.0 (59.0)	19.4 (66.9)	23.8 (74.8)	24.6 (76.3)	21.0 (69.8)	15.1 (59.2)	9.6 (49.3)	4.8 (40.6)	12.9 (55.2)
Mean minimum °C (°F)	−1.1 (30.0)	−1.4 (29.5)	0.2 (32.4)	3.7 (38.7)	10.0 (50.0)	15.1 (59.2)	20.2 (68.4)	21.2 (70.2)	15.8 (60.4)	9.5 (49.1)	4.0 (39.2)	0.8 (33.4)	−1.8 (28.8)
Record low °C (°F)	−7.0 (19.4)	−8.3 (17.1)	−6.3 (20.7)	−2.6 (27.3)	1.4 (34.5)	5.7 (42.3)	14.3 (57.7)	15.6 (60.1)	9.1 (48.4)	2.2 (36.0)	−1.2 (29.8)	−5.8 (21.6)	−8.3 (17.1)
Average precipitation mm (inches)	50.9 (2.00)	65.7 (2.59)	105.1 (4.14)	107.3 (4.22)	129.5 (5.10)	228.7 (9.00)	223.5 (8.80)	99.0 (3.90)	148.9 (5.86)	113.0 (4.45)	71.3 (2.81)	61.8 (2.43)	1,404.6 (55.30)
Average snowfall cm (inches)	0 (0)	0 (0)	0 (0)	0 (0)	0 (0)	0 (0)	0 (0)	0 (0)	0 (0)	0 (0)	0 (0)	0 (0)	1 (0.4)
Average precipitation days (≥ 0.5 mm)	8.2	8.5	11.2	10.5	9.5	13.1	10.9	8.2	9.8	8.2	8.2	8.9	115.1
Average relative humidity (%)	63	63	63	62	64	73	72	70	70	68	67	65	67
Mean monthly sunshine hours	129.2	142.2	175.1	190.8	205.9	151.1	189.0	218.1	164.3	174.1	144.9	129.8	2,014.5
Source: Japan Meteorological Agency

== Demographics ==
Per Japanese census data, the population of Matsuyama grew steadily throughout the 20th century but has plateaued in the 21st.

Historical population
Year	Pop.	±%
1920	181,496	—
1930	208,446	+14.8%
1940	205,939	−1.2%
1950	265,678	+29.0%
1960	307,372	+15.7%
1970	362,998	+18.1%
1980	442,147	+21.8%
1990	480,854	+8.8%
2000	508,266	+5.7%
2010	517,231	+1.8%
2020	511,192	−1.2%

== History ==
The area of Matsuyama was part of ancient Iyo Province. Dōgo Onsen was already famous in the Asuka period, and Shōtoku Taishi visited the spa in the year 596. It is also mentioned in passing in The Tale of Genji. At the end of the Heian period, Kōno Michinobu supported Minamoto no Yoritomo against the Heike clan during the Genpei War and was awarded with a position as shugo of Iyo Province. In the Muromachi period, the clan made their stronghold at Yuzuki Castle, near Dōgo Onsen, and developed the port of Mitsuhama to the west to link the area to Honshū and Kyūshū. The clan was conquered by Toyotomi Hideyoshi during his invasion of Shikoku, and later the area became part of Iyo-Matsuyama Domain under the Tokugawa shogunate. A jōkamachi developed around Matsuyama Castle, and this is the core of the modern city. The city was established with the creation of the modern municipality system on December 15, 1889. The city was bombed on July 26, 1945, in the final stages of World War II, with 251 civilians killed and over 55% of the city area destroyed.

In the twentieth century, various mergers joined Matsuyama with neighboring towns of Dōgo, Mitsuhama, and other townships, aided by urban sprawl, creating a seamless modern city that now ranks as the largest in Shikoku. On October 1, 2018, Matsuyama absorbed the city of Hōjō, and town of Nakajima (from the former Onsen District).

== Government ==
Matsuyama has a mayor-council form of government with a directly elected mayor and a unicameral city council of 42 members. Matsuyama, together with Kumakōgen, contributes 16 members to the Ehime Prefectural Assembly. In terms of national politics, the city is split between Ehime 1st district and Ehime 2nd district of the lower house of the Diet of Japan.

== Economy ==
Matsuyama is a major regional commercial center. Key industries include agriculture represented by mandarin oranges, tourism centered around Dōgo Onsen and Matsuyama Castle, and manufacturing centered on chemical fibers. Industrial areas spread along the coast near airports and harbors, including the Teijin Group's largest production base, and factories of Miura (boiler manufacturer), Iseki (tractor and engine equipment), Hatada Ichiroku (Japanese style confectionery), Poem, a food processing division of Pom (Ehime Drink Company), and the retailing companies Fuji and Daiki all have their headquarters in Matsuyama.

== Education ==
=== Universities and colleges ===
- Ehime University
- Matsuyama Junior College
- Matsuyama Shinonome College
- Matsuyama University
- St. Catherine University

=== Primary and secondary education ===
Matsuyama has 62 public elementary schools and 31 public middle schools operated by the city government. The city has seven public high schools operated by the Ehime Prefectural Board of Education, including the Ehime Prefectural Matsuyama Central Senior High School and the Ehime Prefectural Matsuyama Higashi High School and two national high schools operated by Ehime University. There are two private combined middle/high schools and 11 private high schools. The prefecture also operates two special education schools for the handicapped.

=== International schools ===
Matsuyama has one Korean school (Chōsen gakkō), the Shikoku Korean Elementary and Junior High School (四国朝鮮初中級学校).

== Transportation ==
=== Airports ===
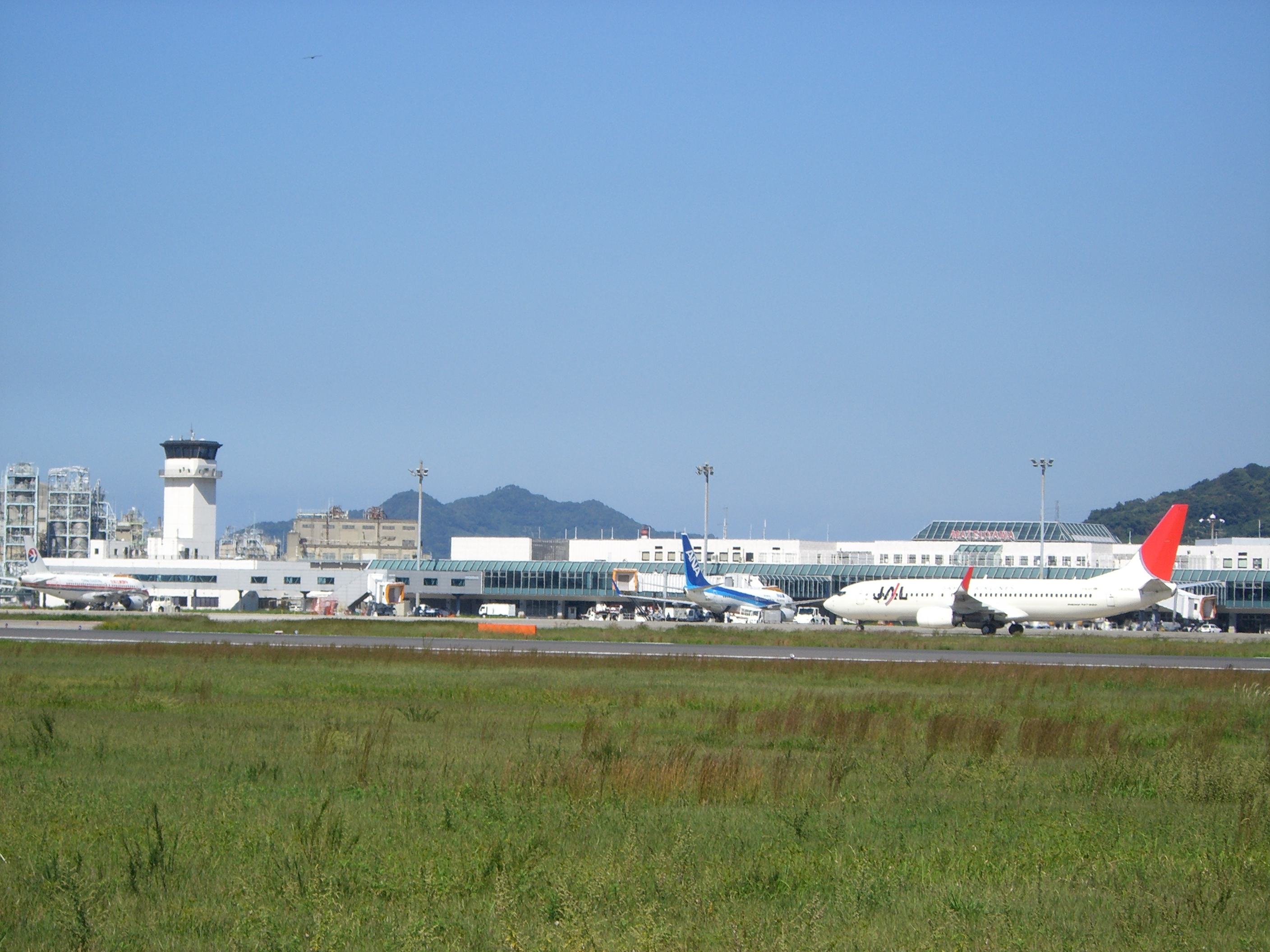
Matsuyama Airport（MYJ）

- Matsuyama Airport, with flights to Tokyo, Seoul, Shanghai, and various other cities.

=== Railways ===
Shikoku Railway Company – Yosan Line

- Asanami – Ōura – Iyo-Hōjō – Yanagihara – Awai – Kōyōdai – Horie – Iyo-Wake – Mitsuhama – Matsuyama – Ichitsubo

Iyotetsu – Takahama Line

- Takahama – Baishinji – Minatoyama – Mitsu – Yamanishi – Nishi-Kinuyama – Kinuyama – Komachi – Ōtemachi – Matsuyama City

Iyotetsu – Yokogawara Line

- Matsuyama City – Ishitegawa Park – Iyo-Tachibana – Fukuonji – Kita-Kume – Kume – Takanoko – Hirai – Umenomoto

Iyotetsu – Gunchū Line

- Matsuyama City – Dobashi – Doida – Yōgo – Kamata

=== Trams ===
Iyo Railway also operates a system of trams and buses that serve as the city's main modes of public transportation. Matsuyama is one of the few Japanese cities that did not do away with its original tram system, which has been continually operated since 1887.

- Jōhoku Line: Komachi – Heiwadōri 1
- Jōnan Line: Dōgo Onsen – Nishi-Horibata, Kamiichiman – Heiwadōri 1
- Honmachi Line: Nishi-Horibata – Hommachi 6
- Ōtemachi Line: Nishi-Horibata – JR Matsuyama Station – Komachi
- Hanazono Line: Matsuyama City Station – Minami-Horibata

=== Highways ===
- Matsuyama Expressway
- National Route 11
- National Route 33
- National Route 56
- National Route 196
- National Route 317
- National Route 379
- National Route 437
- National Route 196

=== Ports ===
- Port of Matsuyama, with regular ferry service to Hiroshima and regular night ferries to Kobe, Kokurakita-ku, Kitakyūshū, and several other destinations. Also, a hydrofoil service exists between Hiroshima and a few other destinations.

== Sister cities ==
In addition to one friendship city, Matsuyama has three sister cities, as designated by Sister Cities International:

- Freiburg, Baden-Württemberg, Germany
- Pyeongtaek, Gyeonggi, South Korea
- Sacramento, California, United States
- Taipei, Taiwan, friendship city since 2016

== Local attractions ==
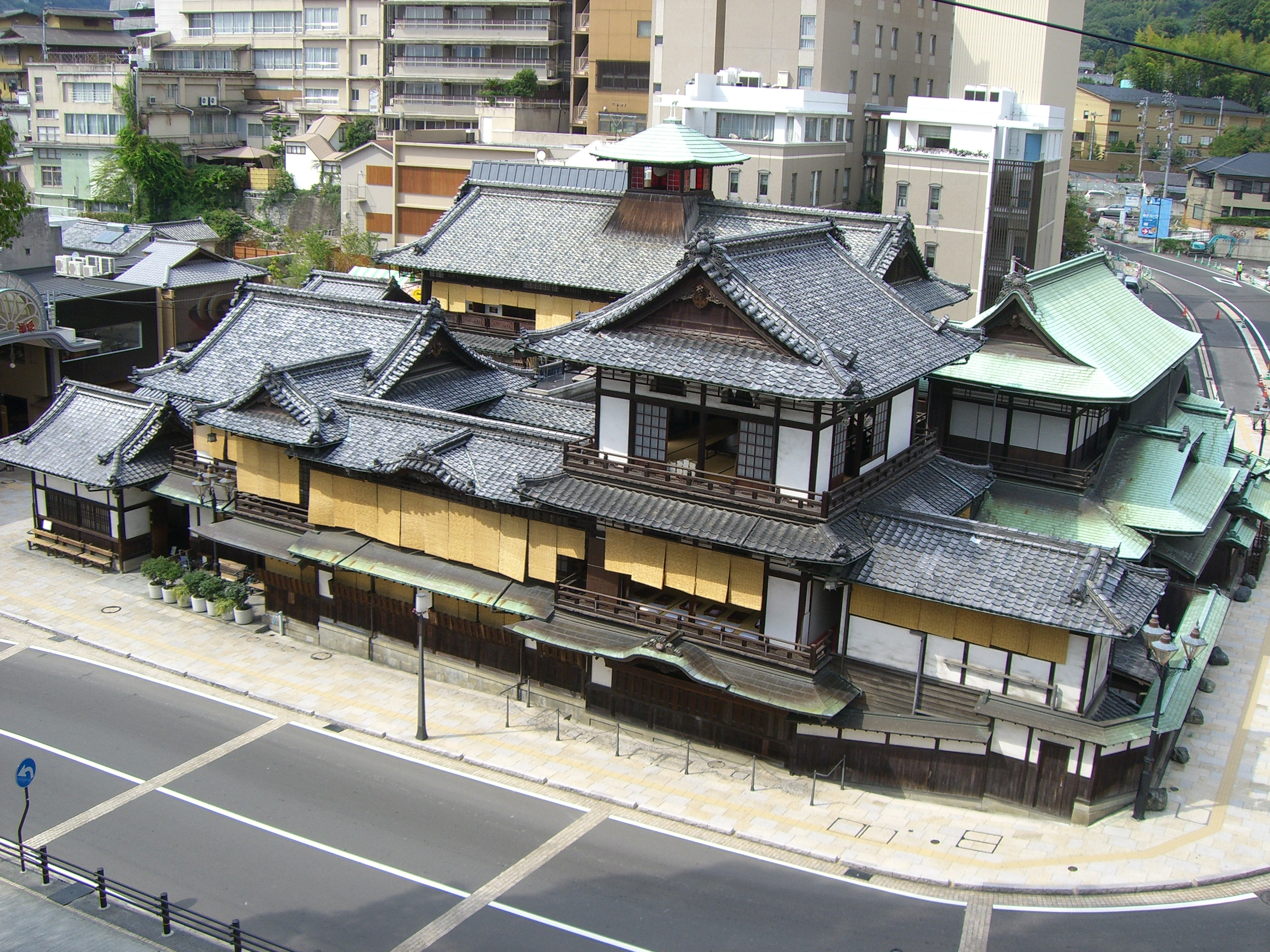
Dōgo Onsen Honkan

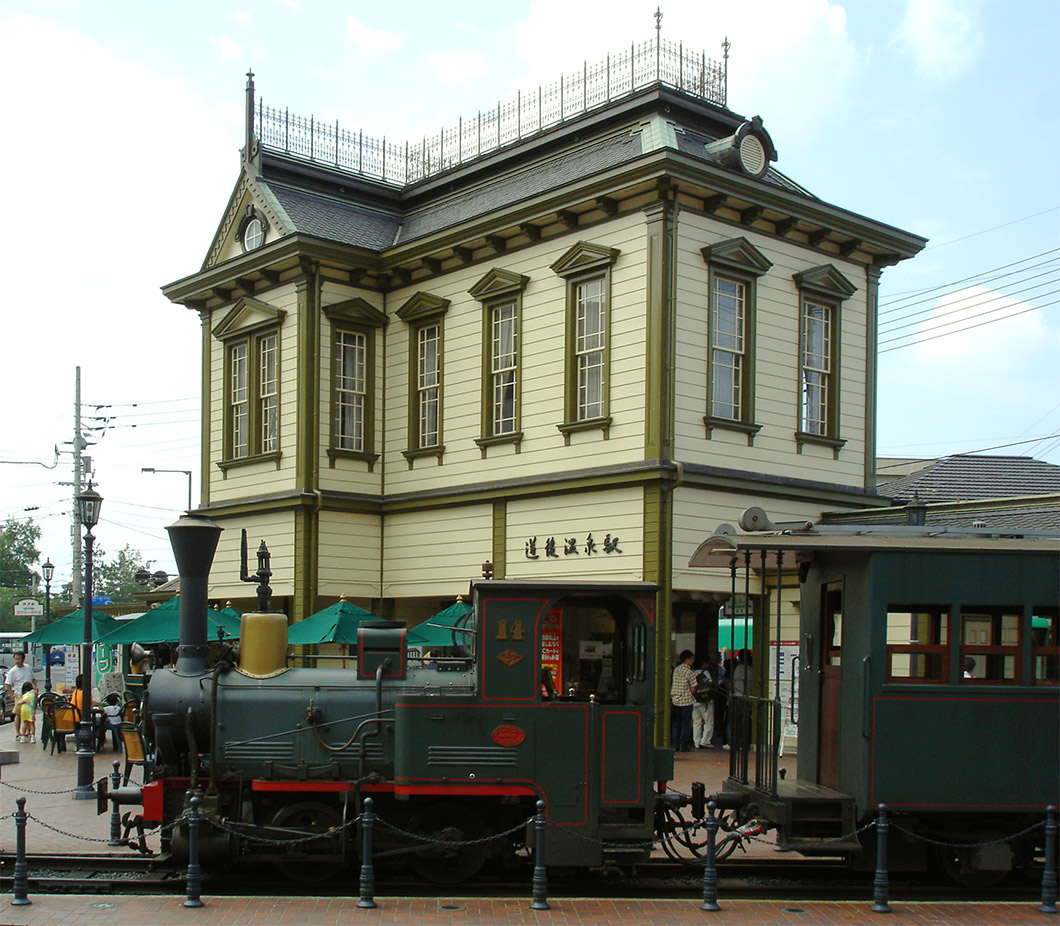
Botchan Ressha at Dogo Station, Matsuyama

The city is known for its hot springs (onsen), among the oldest in Japan, and is home to the Dōgo Onsen Honkan, a Meiji Period wooden public bathhouse dating from 1894. A second favorite tourist spot is Matsuyama Castle. Eight of the eighty-eight temples in the Shikoku Pilgrimage are in Matsuyama.

Buddhist temples in Matsuyama include Ishite-ji (石手寺), Taisan-ji (太山寺), and Jōdo-ji (浄土寺), all dating back to the 8th century, although the oldest surviving buildings are from the early 14th century, as well as Hōgon-ji (宝厳寺), Taihō-ji (大宝寺) and Enmyō-ji (円明寺). Shrines of the city include Isaniwa Jinja (伊佐爾波神社), built in 1667.

The haiku poet Masaoka Shiki lived in Matsuyama. His house, now known as the Shiki-do, and a museum, the Shiki Memorial Museum, are popular attractions, and the centerpieces of the city's claim as a center of the international haiku movement. Other haiku poets associated with Matsuyama include Kurita Chodō, whose Kōshin-an was visited by Kobayashi Issa, Shiki's followers, Takahama Kyoshi and Kawahigashi Hekigoto, and Taneda Santōka. Santoka's house, known as Isso-an, is also a tourist attraction and is periodically open to the public. The Matsuyama Declaration of 1999 proposed the formation of the International Haiku Research Center, and the first Masaoka Shiki International Haiku Awards were given in 2000. Recipients have included Yves Bonnefoy (2000), Cor van den Heuvel (2002) and Gary Snyder (2004).

The famed novel Botchan by Natsume Sōseki is set in Matsuyama. As a result, there are numerous sites and locales named after the main character, including Botchan Stadium, the Botchan Ressha (an antique train that runs on the city's tramway), and Botchan dango.

Matsuyama also figures in several works by Shiba Ryōtarō, notably his popular novel, Saka no Ue no Kumo [Clouds Above the Hill] (1969). In anticipation of the upcoming NHK Taiga drama adaptation of Saka no Ue no Kumo, a Saka no Ue no Kumo Museum was established in 2007.

Matsuyama was also the setting of a 1907 novel about the Russo-Japanese War, As the Hague Ordains, by American writer Eliza Ruhamah Scidmore. Matsuyama figures in the novel because the city housed a camp for Russian prisoners during the war. A Russian cemetery commemorates this important episode in Matsuyama history. The Russo-Japanese War is also remembered in Matsuyama because of the contributions of two Japanese military leaders, the Akiyama brothers, Akiyama Saneyuki and Akiyama Yoshifuru, who were born in the city.

Matsuyama has several important museums. The Museum of Art, Ehime is the city's main art museum, its collections emphasizing the works of regional artists. The Shiki Memorial Museum is a museum that focuses on the life and work of Masaoka Shiki, with special attention to his contribution to haiku. The Saka no Ue no Kumo Museum features exhibits connected with the novel and television series. There is a Juzo Itami museum dedicated to the film director.

Products (meibutsu) of Matsuyama include tarts and Botchan dango. In the 17th century, the lord of Matsuyama castle Sadayuki Matsudaira (松平定行) introduced the process of tart-making, originally brought to Japan by the Portuguese, to Matsuyama. At first it was a Castella with jam. According to legend Sadayuki made some changes, such as adding red bean paste. Now there are many kinds and makers of tarts in Matsuyama; some add yuzu paste or chestnut to the red bean paste. In addition to tarts, Botchan dango is also a product of Matsuyama. Botchan dango was named after the novel Botchan by Natsume Sōseki. It consists of three bean paste beads of three flavors, matcha, egg, and red bean paste. Within the paste is contained mochi.

Matsuyama is the site of a number of festivals, including the Dogo Festival, held in the spring, the Matsuyama Festival, held in August, and the Fall Festival, held in October, which features battling mikoshi.

== Sports ==
The city is represented in the J. League of football with its local club, Ehime FC. The Ehime Mandarin Pirates also represent the city in the baseball Shikoku Island League Plus.

== Notable people from Matsuyama ==
- Kenta Abe, baseball player
- Akiyama Saneyuki, admiral in the Imperial Japanese Navy
- Akiyama Yoshifuru, general in the Imperial Japanese Army
- Kotomi Aoki, manga artist
- Ryō Aono, snowboarder
- Sidney Gulick, missionary
- Harada Sanosuke, 10th unit captain of the Shinsengumi
- Tomoko Honda, announcer
- Ippen, Buddhist preacher
- Juzo Itami, film director
- Mansaku Itami, film director
- Masaru Kageura, baseball player
- Katō Yoshiaki, daimyō
- Kurita Chodō, haiku poet
- Chiaki Kusuhara, beach volleyball player
- Loveli, fashion model and television personality
- Kanako Murata, Professional mixed martial artist
- Alan Shirahama, performer, actor, and DJ
- Masaoka Shiki, poet
- Hideki Matsuyama, golfer
- Yōko Matsuyama, actress
- Yasuyuki Muneta, judoka
- Riki Nakaya, judoka
- Kenzaburō Ōe, writer
- Nathaniel Rosen, cellist
- Mika Saiki, beach volleyball player
- Koshiro Shimada, Figure Skater
- Hisui Sugiura, graphic designer
- Kyoshi Takahama, poet
- Makoto Tamada, motorcycle racer
- Tadao Tannaka, mathematician
- Taneda Santōka, haiku poet
- Toshirō Tomochika, football player and politician
- Reiko Tosa, athlete
- Tetsu Yano, writer

== See also ==
- Matsuyama tengu (Noh play)
- Rakuzan ware (Ehime)
- Songshan District, Taipei, named after Matsuyama
