= Botchan =

1906 novel by Natsume Sōseki

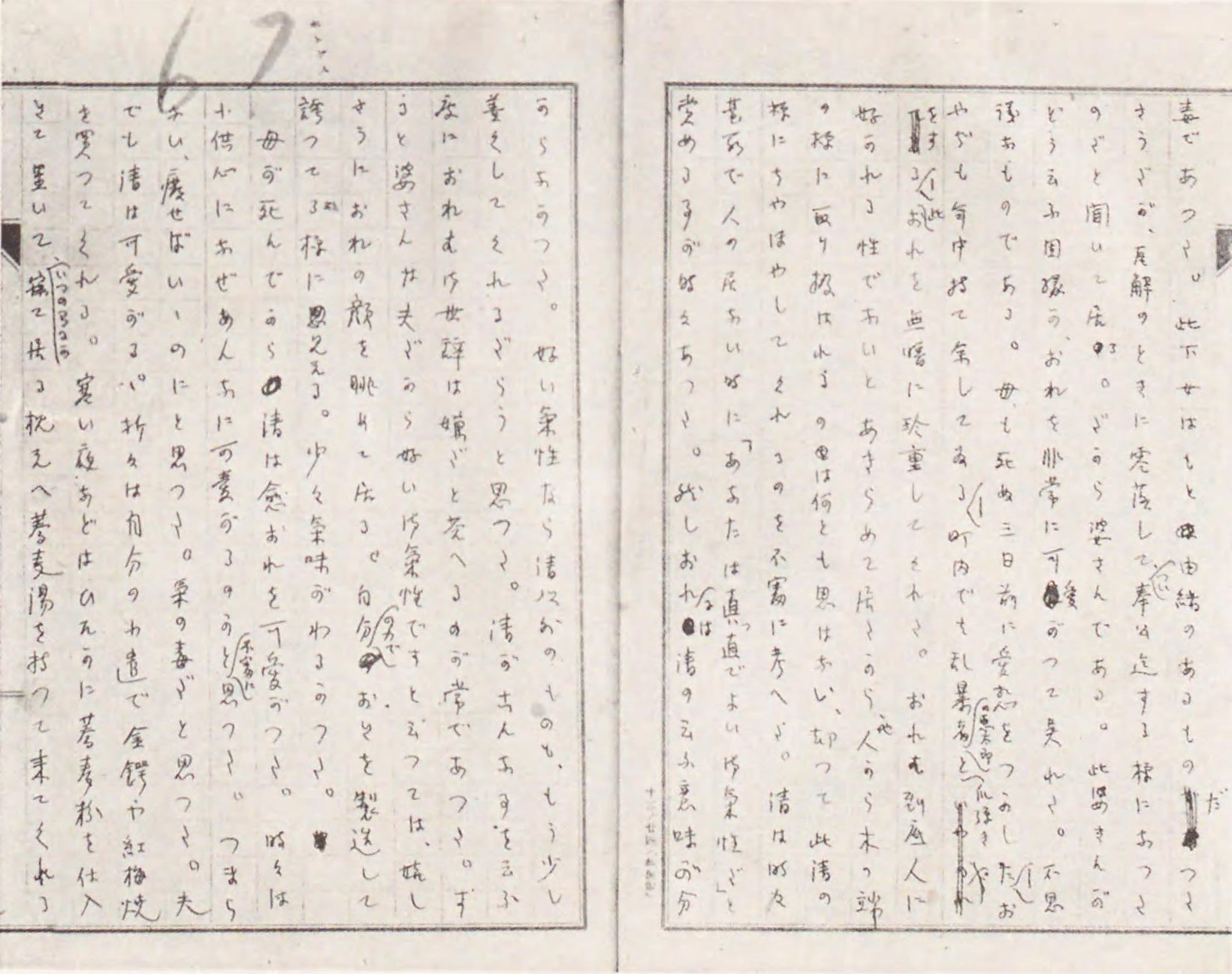
Part of manuscripts of "Botchan" by Natsume Soseki

Botchan (坊っちゃん; Japanese pronunciation: [boꜜtʲ.tɕaɴ]) is a novel written by Japanese author Natsume Sōseki in 1906. It is one of the most popular Japanese novels, read by many during their school years. The central theme of the story is morality, but there are generous amounts of humor and sarcasm alongside it.

== Background ==
The story is based on the author's personal experience as a teacher dispatched to Matsuyama on the island of Shikoku. Sōseki was born in Tokyo, and dwelling in Matsuyama was his first experience living elsewhere. The novel is set at a middle school identified by critics as Matsuyama's present day Ehime Prefectural Matsuyama Higashi High School.

== Plot summary ==
Botchan (young master) is the first-person narrator of the novel. He grows up in Tokyo as a reckless and rambunctious youth. In the opening chapter he hurts himself jumping from the second floor of his elementary school, fights the boy next door, and tramples a neighbor's carrot patch by wrestling (sumo style) on the straw that covers the seedlings. His parents favor his older brother, who is quiet and studious. Botchan is also not well regarded in the neighborhood, having a reputation as the local roughneck. Kiyo, the family's elderly maidservant, is the only one who finds anything redeeming in Botchan's character.

After Botchan's mother passes away, Kiyo devotes herself fervently to his welfare, treating him from her own allowance with gifts and favors. Botchan initially finds her affection onerous, but over time he grows to appreciate her dedication, and she eventually becomes his mother figure and moral role model.

Six years after his mother's death, as Botchan is finishing middle school, his father falls ill and passes away. His older brother liquidates the family assets and provides Botchan with 600 yen before leaving to start his own career. Botchan uses this money to study physics for three years. On graduating, he accepts a job teaching middle school mathematics in Matsuyama on the island of Shikoku. He frequents Dōgo Onsen, a hot spring.

Botchan's tenure in Matsuyama turns out to be short (less than two months) but eventful. His arrogance and quick temper immediately lead to clashes with the students and staff. The students retaliate excessively by tracking his every movement in the small town and traumatizing him during his 'night duty' stay in the dormitory.

Mischief by the students turns out to be just the first salvo in a broader web of intrigue and villainy. The school's assistant head teacher (Red Shirt) and English teacher (Squash) are vying for the hand of the local beauty (Madonna), and two camps have formed within the middle school staff. Botchan struggles initially to see through the guises and sort out the players. After several missteps, he concludes that Squash and the head mathematics teacher (Porcupine) hold the moral high ground in the conflict. Red Shirt, who presents himself as a refined scholar, turns out to be highly superficial and self-serving.

As the story progresses, Red Shirt schemes to eliminate his rivals. He begins by having Uranari (Squash) transferred to a remote post on the pretext of furthering his career. Next he uses a contrived street brawl and his newspaper connections to defame both mathematics teachers (Botchan and Porcupine) and to force Porcupine's resignation.

Botchan and Porcupine realize that they cannot beat the system, so they scheme a way to get even. They stake out Red Shirt's known haunt, an inn near the hot springs town, and catch him and his sidekick Hanger-on sneaking home in the morning after overnighting with geisha. With his usual eloquence, Red Shirt points out that they have no direct proof of any wrongdoing. Botchan and Porcupine overcome this technicality by pummeling both Red Shirt and Yoshikawa into submission on the spot.

After dispensing justice with his fists, Botchan drops a letter of resignation into the mail and immediately heads for the harbor. He returns to Tokyo, finds employment, and establishes a modest household with Kiyo. After Kiyo dies of pneumonia, he has her respectfully interred in his own family's grave plot.

== Main characters ==
- Botchan (young master): The first-person narrator of the novel. Born and raised in Tokyo, he is fiercely proud of his Edokko (Tokyo man) pedigree. He graduates from the Tokyo Academy of Physics (currently Tokyo University of Science), and takes a job teaching middle school mathematics in Matsuyama on the Island of Shikoku.
- Kiyo (meaning "pure"): The old maidservant of Botchan's family in Tokyo. She is a fallen aristocrat, dealing heroically with what life has dealt her.
- Uranari (meaning "unripe calabash"): Nicknamed Uranari due to his plump face and pale complexion. His real name is Koga, and he is the middle school English teacher. Uranari is a very melancholic, but refined, gentleman. He is humble and self-effacing in the extreme, but his arranged engagement to the local beauty (Madonna) puts him in the eye of a tempest as a jealous rivalry unfolds.
- Yamaarashi (meaning "porcupine"): His real name is Hotta, and he is the middle school's head mathematics teacher. Yamaarashi hails from Aizu. He has a strong physical presence and a booming voice. He sees himself as a champion of justice and does not shrink from confrontation.
- Red Shirt: Nicknamed so because he always wears a red flannel shirt, even in hot weather. His real name is not given. Red Shirt is the middle school's head teacher and the only staff member with a doctoral degree (in literature). He presents himself as the sophisticated scholar. He sets his sights on Uranari's fiancée (Madonna), and his scheme to usurp her creates the central conflict of the novel.
- Nodaiko (Field radish): His real name is Yoshikawa, and he is the middle school art teacher. Nodaiko is Red Shirt's obsequious sidekick and an eager cohort in his schemes.
- Tanuki (Japanese raccoon dog): His real name is not given. He is the middle school principal and a pseudo-intellectual. He prides himself on his professional demeanor and adherence to protocol, but he often plays the role of a puppet who is manipulated behind the scenes by Red Shirt.

== Supporting characters ==
- Botchan's older brother: His name is not given. He is studious, pale in complexion, and somewhat effeminate. He is the favorite of the parents and not on good terms with Botchan. This older brother gets the upper hand over Botchan in argument and in shogi (Japanese chess), but he comes out on the losing end of their physical altercations.
- Ikagin: Botchan's first landlord in Matsuyama. He helps himself freely to Botchan's tea while pressure-selling him antiques and curiosities. When Botchan rejects his sales tactics, he has Botchan removed as a tenant on false pretenses.
- Madonna: Nickname used by the middle school staff to refer to Miss Toyama. She is the local beauty who is engaged to Uranari by previous arrangement but coveted by Red Shirt.

== Major themes ==
- Botchan's observations and thoughts about Matsuyama, on Shikoku, one of the four main islands of Japan. Botchan grows up in the rapidly modernizing Meiji-era Tokyo before moving to the more traditional Matsuyama. He is often confounded by the culture and customs of Matsuyama.
- The battle for the heart and mind of Botchan between Yama Arashi and Red Shirt. Will Botchan's common sense and moral grounding be corrupted by Red Shirt, or will he team up with Yama Arashi to battle the elitist culture and its break from tradition and morals, for purely selfish gain, that Red Shirt represents? This is the question posed through much of the novel.
- At the time of the writing of Botchan, Japan was in the midst of a rapidly accelerating westernization, where traditional Japanese values and way of life were disappearing, especially in big cities such as Tokyo. Soseki himself had spent three years in London as a student of English literature. In his later works, Soseki seems to imply that the antagonist Red Shirt represents the author himself; an elitist intellectual who has only a shallow understanding of European culture, at odds with Japanese values and morals.

== Adaptations ==
Jiro Taniguchi adapted parts of the novel into his ten-volume series—published in Japan beginning in 1986—called The Times of Botchan in English. Other translations have appeared in French (Au temps de Botchan), Italian ('Ai tempi di Bocchan) and Spanish (La epoca de Botchan), all published by Coconino Press. A new translation has also appeared in Spanish, published by Editorial Impedimenta.

There were film adaptations by Toho predecessor P.C.L. in 1935; Tokyo Eiga in 1953; and Shochiku in 1958, 1966, and 1977. Numerous television adaptations have included the 1980 TMS Entertainment film supervised by Osamu Dezaki and the 1986 animated version in the form of two episodes of the anime series Animated Classics of Japanese Literature (青春アニメ全集, Seishun Anime Zenshu), which was released in North America by Central Park Media.

== See also ==
- Japanese literature
