= Shiki Memorial Museum =

Matsuyama City Shiki Memorial Museum
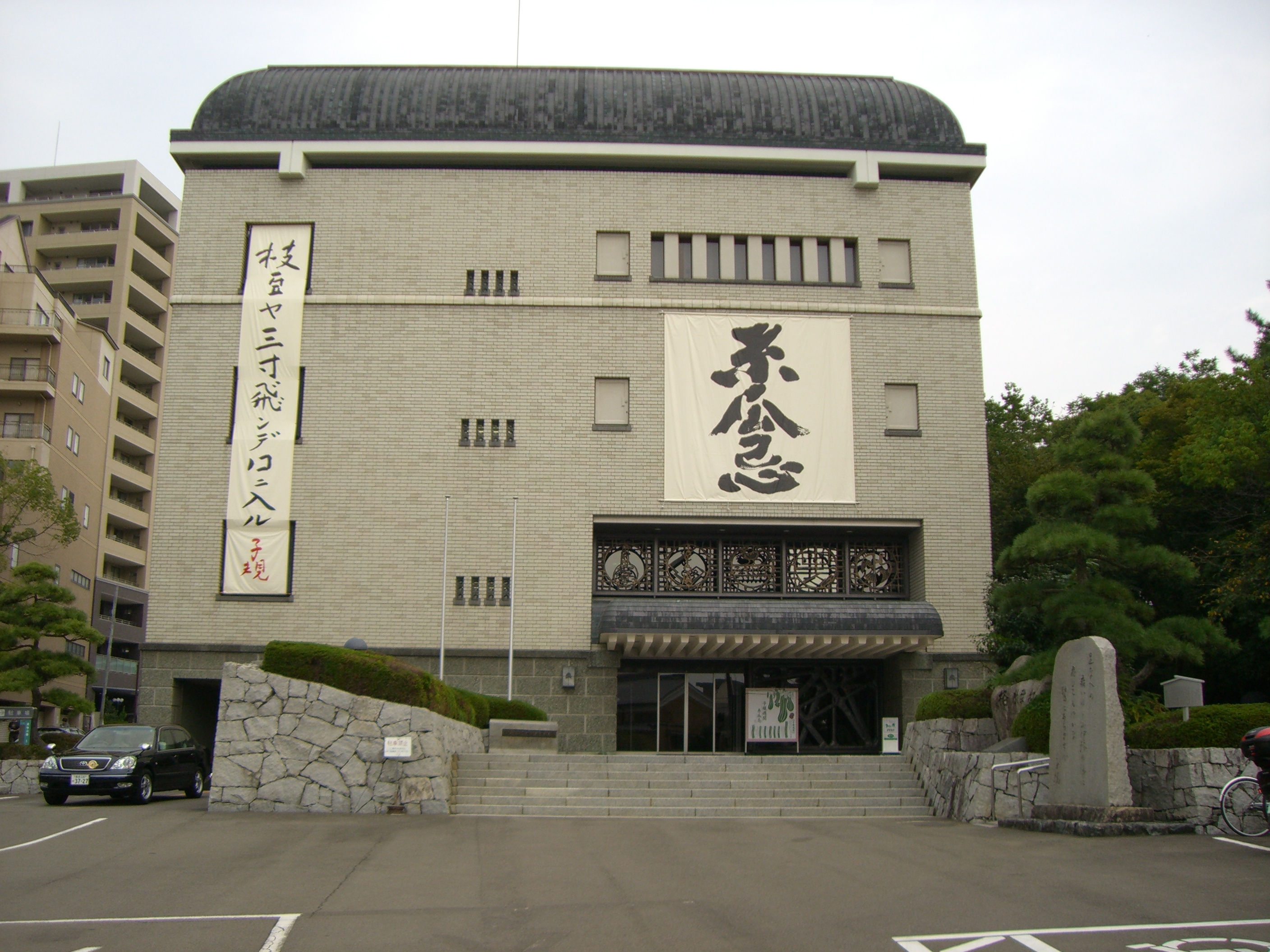

- Shiki Museum location in Matsuyama, Japan
- Established: 1981
- Location: 1-30 Dogo Koen, Matsuyama, Ehime 790-0857
- Coordinates: 33.849657°N 132.787371°E
- Website: Matsuyama City Shiki Memorial Museum

The Matsuyama City Shiki Memorial Museum (子規記念博物館, Shiki Kinen Hakubutsukan) is a museum devoted mainly to the life and work of Japanese writer Masaoka Shiki, who was born and raised in Matsuyama. Shiki is widely considered to be the most important figure in the modernization of both haiku and tanka poetry. The museum also includes exhibits about the early history of Matsuyama.

== History ==
The Shiki Memorial Museum is dedicated to the renowned haiku poet Masaoka Shiki between 1867 and 1902. Its mission is to preserve and promote Masaoka Shiki's legacy and his contribution to Japanese literature. It serves as a cultural institution dedicated to the study and appreciation of haiku poetry, offering exhibitions, educational programs and research facilities for scholars and enthusiasts.
