= Akiyama Saneyuki =

Japanese military officer (1868–1918)

- 秋山 真之
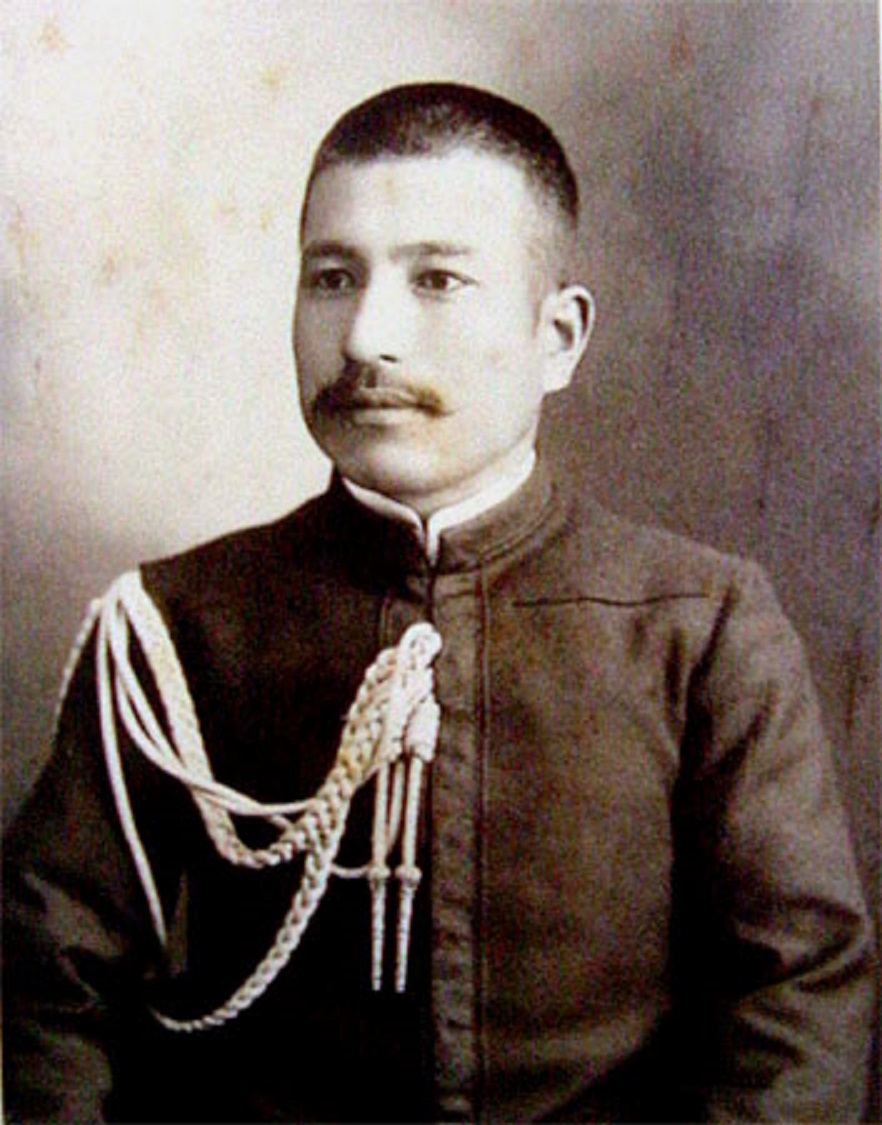
- Born: April 12, 1868; Matsuyama, Iyo Province, Japan
- Died: February 4, 1918 (aged 49); Odawara, Kanagawa, Japan
- Military career
- Allegiance: Empire of Japan
- Branch: Imperial Japanese Navy
- Service years: 1890–1917
- Rank: Vice Admiral
- Commands: 2nd Fleet; Akitsushima; Otowa; Hashidate; Izumo; Ibuki
- Conflicts: First Sino-Japanese War; Russo-Japanese War

Akiyama Saneyuki (秋山 真之; April 12, 1868 – February 4, 1918) was a Japanese navy officer in the Imperial Japanese Navy during the Meiji era. He was a planner of Battle of Tsushima in the Russo-Japanese War. General Akiyama Yoshifuru was his elder brother and politician Hisako Ōishi was his granddaughter.

== Biography ==
=== Early life and career ===
Akiyama was born in Matsuyama Domain, Iyo Province, as a son of a poor samurai. As a youth, he studied literature, especially traditional waka poetry. The famous poet Masaoka Shiki was his friend from childhood. Later the two young men went to Tokyo to study literature and Akiyama began to prepare for entry into the Literature Department of Tokyo Imperial University. However, Akiyama was forced to abandon his study of letters as his elder brother Yoshifuru ordered him to go to Naval Academy in Tsukiji, Tokyo instead, largely due to the economically severe condition of the Akiyama family.

While Akiyama was a student, the Naval Academy moved to Etajima, in Hiroshima prefecture, and was renamed the Imperial Japanese Naval Academy. Akiyama was an outstanding student, graduating on 17 July 1890 as a midshipman at the top of the 17th class, out of 88 cadets. He graduated just weeks after the publication of the first and last chapters of Alfred Thayer Mahan's classic study, The Influence of Sea Power Upon History, 1660–1783 in its Japanese translation in July 1890.

Akiyama served his midshipman tour on the Hiei and cruiser Takachiho. On commissioning as an ensign on 23 May 1892, he rose through the ranks in a variety of routine shipboard assignments and duties that included deployments throughout the Pacific Ocean, Mediterranean Sea, and European waters. He was assigned to the Ryūjō. He subsequently served on the Matsushima, Yoshino, Tsukushi (during the Battle of Weihaiwei in the First Sino-Japanese War), Izumi and Yaeyama. Following the hostilities he served a tour at the Imperial Navy's Torpedo school and then was assigned to naval intelligence, where he spent several months posing as a laborer and conducting missions in Manchuria and Korea.

=== Studies in the United States ===
After his promotion to lieutenant on 24 October 1896, Akiyama was sent to the United States as a naval attaché from 26 June 1897 to 27 December 1899. It was a time of heightened tension between Japan and the United States, due to the overthrow of the Kingdom of Hawaii by American marines and settlers, which nearly led to a rupture of diplomatic relations.

On Akiyama's arrival in New York, he attempted to contact Alfred Thayer Mahan for advice and recommendations on how to study at either the US Naval Academy or Naval War College. Mahan was unwilling to help, aside from giving Akiyama a list of books to read. Akiyama then contacted the Assistant Secretary of the Navy, Theodore Roosevelt, but his pleas to be allowed to attend the Naval War College were refused.

Akiyama's tour of duty coincided with the start of the Spanish–American War, and he joined the American fleet as a foreign military observer. He was able to watch American forces capture Santiago de Cuba in June 1898, and the blockade of Havana harbor in July. Akiyama submitted a lengthy report back to Japan on his observations, and noting problems in the blockade and landing operations. On conclusion of his tour, he served a short tour as a naval attaché with the Japanese Embassy in Washington D.C.

In February 1899, due to the efforts of the Japanese ambassador, Akiyama received permission to serve a six-month tour on board a US Navy warship, the USS New York, where he was able to observe American tactics and fleet operations in the North Atlantic and Caribbean firsthand. As a result of his service on board, Akiyama participated in several lectures at the Naval War College in Newport, Rhode Island. On completion of his studies in the United States, Akiyama traveled to England from 27 December 1899 to 20 May 1900.

=== Instructor at the Navy War College ===
On his return to Japan, Akiyama was promoted to lieutenant commander on 1 October 1901 and assigned to various staff posts, and was the senior strategy instructor at Japan's Naval War College from July 1902-November 1903. Akiyama initiated a curriculum reform using hypothetical situations to simulate the formulation of orders and development of realistic contingency plans. He also introduced the concepts of wargaming and tabletop map exercises, and developed theories for a new strategic and tactical doctrines for the Japanese Navy based upon his observations during the Spanish–American War. Akiyama focused on Russia as the primary threat to Japan in his lectures.

Akiyama was 34 years old, and was lecturing to officers who were of the same age, or in some cases his senior. Nonetheless, he achieved the respect of his peers due to his professional knowledge, expertise and personality.

=== Russo-Japanese War ===
With the outbreak of the Russo-Japanese War Akiyama was promoted to commander on 1 September 1904. However, he remained on the planning staff and was a close confidant of Japanese Commander in Chief of the Combined Fleet, Togo Heihachiro. Togo insisted that Akiyama accompany him on his battleship Mikasa as a staff officer. Akiyama played a central role in the planning for the Battle of Port Arthur, the Battle of the Yellow Sea, the planning for the arrival of the Russian Baltic Fleet and its subsequent destruction in the Battle of Tsushima. The objective of the Japanese navy in the Battle of Tsushima was to destroy the Russian fleet completely, thereby denying Russia any influence in the Sea of Japan. Akiyama devised the tactic of changing the direction of the fleet while in front of the enemy. He had borrowed this tactic from an old book of the late twelfth century, Old Piratical Tactics of the Nojima School, which described the tactics used by Japanese pirates.

Following Japan's victory Akiyama was designated the senior naval representative for the preliminary negotiations for the Treaty of Portsmouth. However, the untimely death of his mother necessitated his replacement.

=== Postwar activities ===
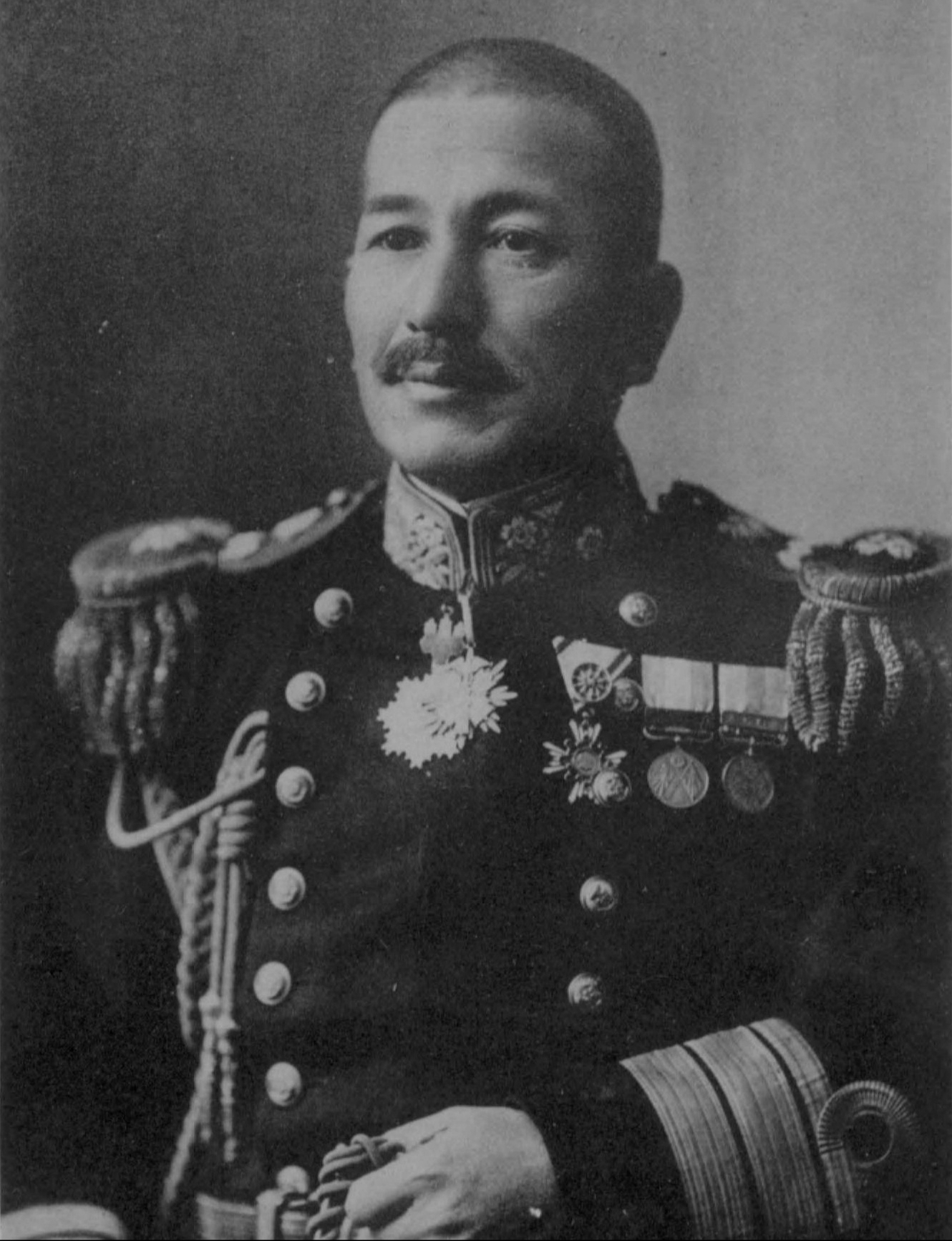
Rear Admiral Akiyama in 1916

Promoted to captain on 25 September 1908, Akiyama received an assignment as executive officer on Mikasa, and subsequently his first command, as captain of Akitsushima. He was subsequently captain of the Otowa, Hashidate, Izumo, and battlecruiser Ibuki.

Akiyama was promoted to rear admiral on 1 December 1913. Soon afterwards, the Siemens-Vickers Naval Armaments Scandal of 1914 shook up the government, forcing the resignations of Yamamoto Gonnohyōe and Ōkuma Shigenobu. Akiyama remained one of the few senior officers completely untouched by suspicion or corruption, and was nominated by Yashiro Rokuro as Director-General of the Navy in an effort to restore public confidence. Akiyama served on the Imperial Japanese Navy General Staff until his retirement on 1 December 1917. His major accomplishment during this period was to have the Otowa stationed permanently at Shanghai, from which it helped support a large network of intelligence agents posing as exchange students in all corners of China. At the same time, Akiyama maintained a regular and secret correspondence with Sun Yat-sen, assisting him also materially in his efforts to prevent Yuan Shikai from establishing a new empire.

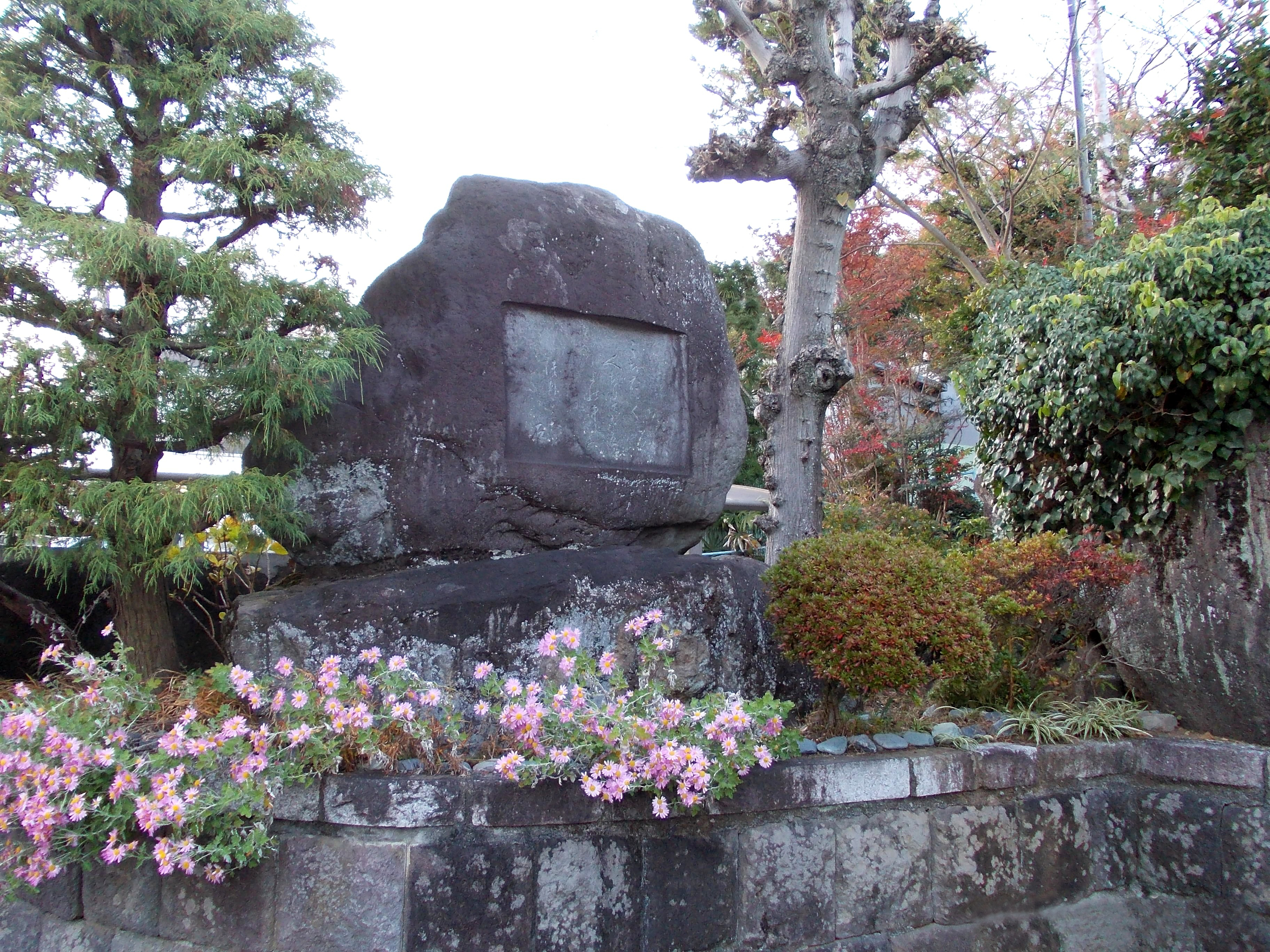
The final resting place of Akiyama Saneyuki

With the outbreak of World War I, Akiyama traveled to Europe via the Trans-Siberian Railroad to Finland, and from there to England, where he met with his old acquaintance, former British naval observer Commander William Christopher Pakenham. In June 1916, King George V conferred upon him a Knight Commandership of the Order of St. Michael and St. George. As Sir Saneyuki, K.C.M.G., he was reportedly the first Japanese outside the Imperial family to receive a knighthood from a British sovereign.

He returned to Japan via the United States to assume command of the IJN 2nd Fleet in October 1917, but by this time he was already very ill, and was forced to retire in late 1917 with the rank of vice admiral. In his final years, he became obsessed with religion, especially with the Oomoto movement and Nichiren sect Buddhism and the Heart Sutra. Akiyama died of peritonitis in 1918 at the young age of 49 (In the East Asian age reckoning, it is sometimes described as being 51 years old), His grave is at Aoyama Cemetery in Tokyo.

== Cultural impact ==
Akiyama and his brother, Akiyama Yoshifuru, along with their friend Masaoka Shiki, are the main characters in Shiba Ryotaro's popular multi-volume novel, Saka no ue no kumo. The novel is also the basis for a three-year NHK television series, also called Saka no ue no kumo.

The Akiyama birthplace in Matsuyama is now a tourist attraction.

== Honors ==
Translated from the corresponding Japanese Wikipedia article

=== Decorations ===
- Order of the Sacred Treasure, 4th Class (30 May 1905, for service at the Battle of Tsushima)
- Order of the Rising Sun, Second Class, Gold and Silver Star (7 November 1915; Third Class, Gold Rays with Neck Ribbon: 1 April 1906)

=== Order of precedence ===
- Senior eighth rank (5 July 1892)
- Seventh rank (21 December 1896)
- Senior seventh rank (8 March 1898)
- Sixth rank (17 December 1901)
- Senior sixth rank (6 October 1904)
- Fifth rank (11 December 1908)
- Senior fifth rank (30 January 1914)
- Fourth rank (4 February 1918, posthumous)
