= Takahama Line =

Railway line in Matsuyama, Ehime

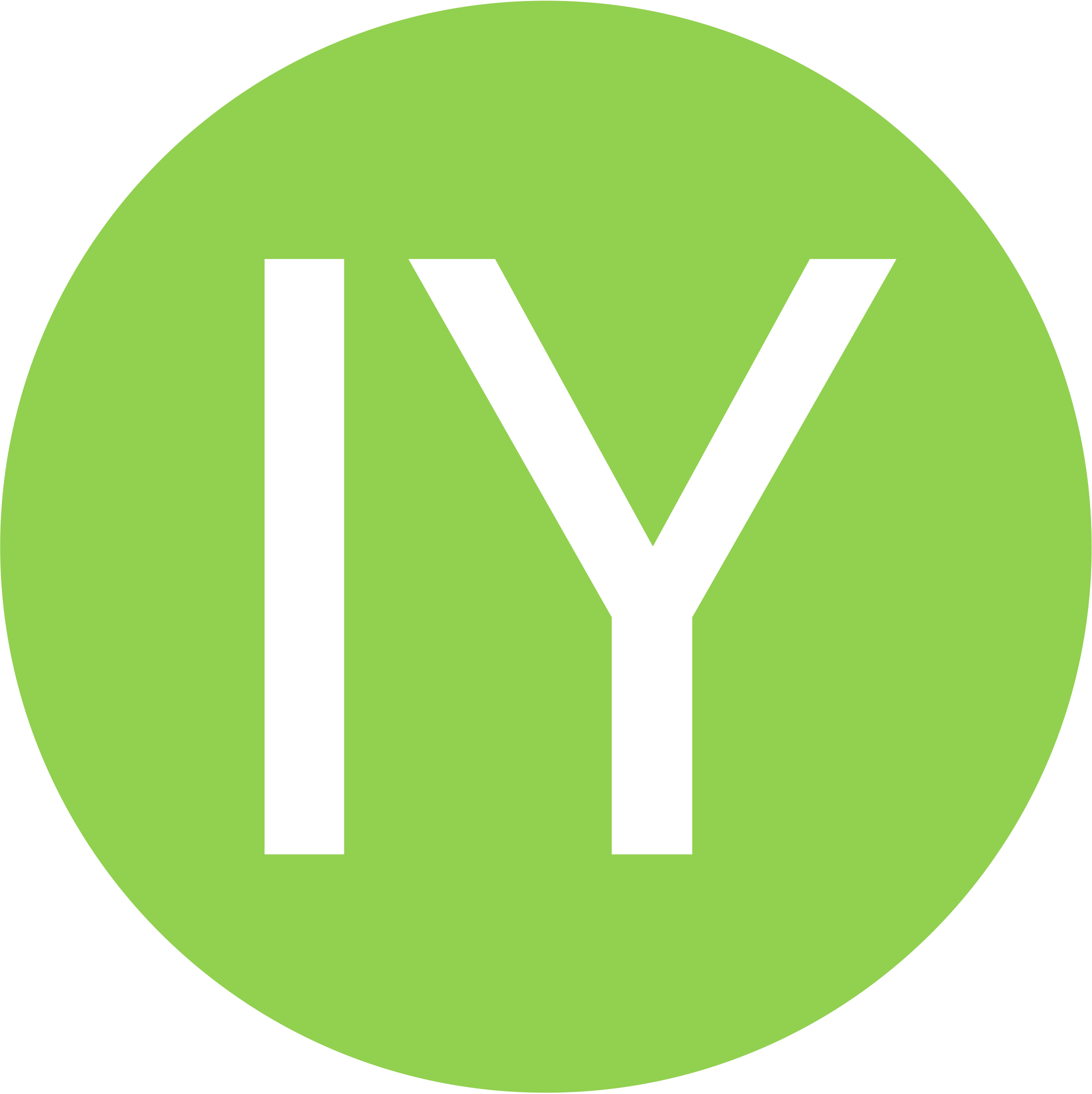

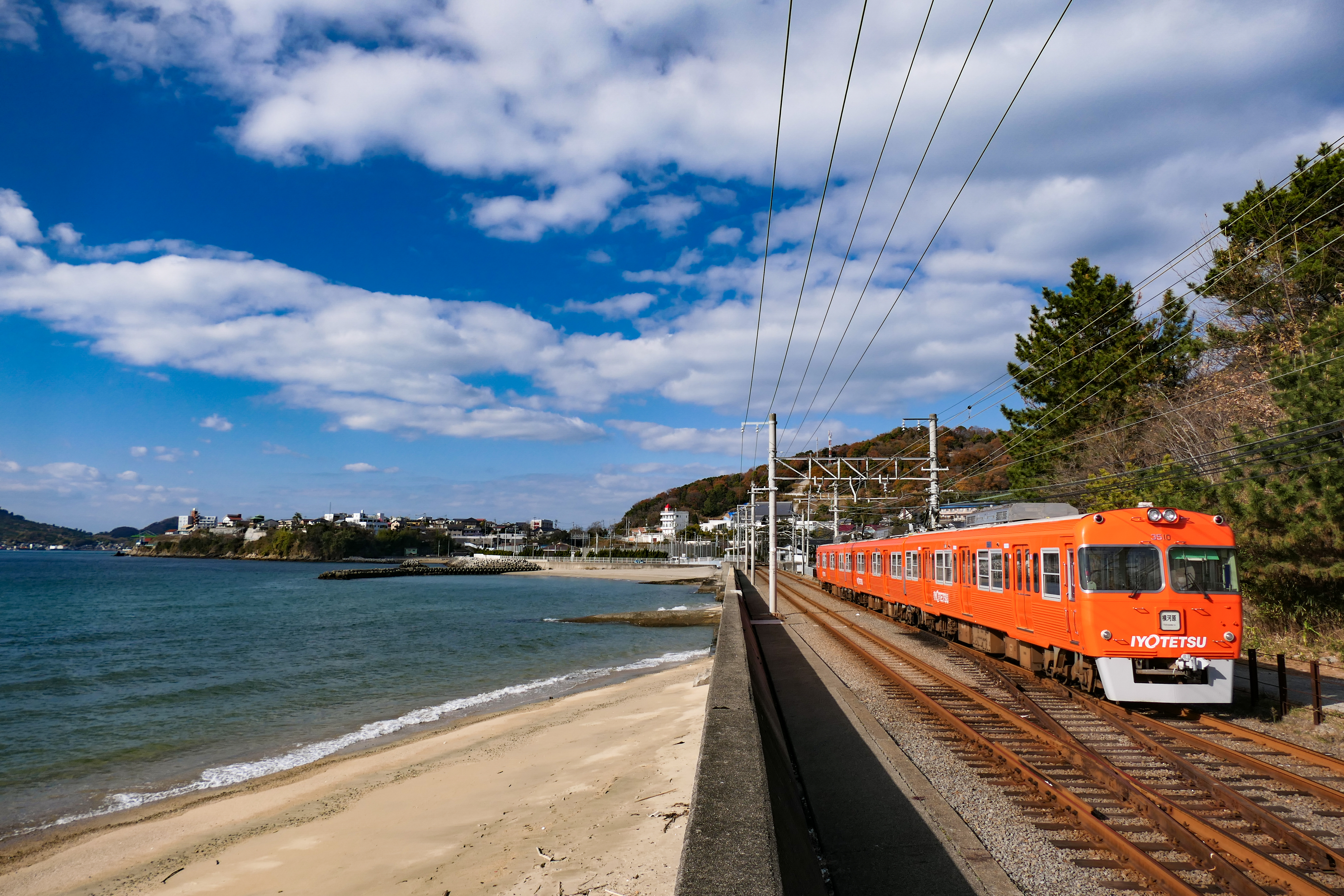
- A 3000-series passenger train on the Takahama Line

Overview
- Native name: 高浜線
- Owner: Iyotetsu
- Locale: Ehime Prefecture
- Termini: Takahama; Matsuyama City
- Stations: 10
- Website: https://www.iyotetsu.co.jp

Service
- Type: Heavy rail

History
- Opened: 28 October 1888; 137 years ago

Technical
- Line length: 9.4 km (5.8 mi)
- Track gauge: 1,067 mm (3 ft 6 in)
- Electrification: Overhead line, DC 600 V
- Operating speed: 60 km/h (37 mph)
Route map

The Takahama Line (高浜線, Takahama-sen) is a 9.4 km railway line owned by Iyotetsu. The line connects Matsuyama with the port town of Mitsuhama in Ehime Prefecture, Japan. The line runs in the northwest direction from Matsuyama City Station, terminating at Takahama Station. Opened in 1888, this is the first railroad in Shikoku.

== Operations ==
The line is electrified with overhead lines and is double-tracked for the entire line, except for the portion between Takahama Station and Baishinji Station.

The majority of rail services continue past Matsuyama City Station on the Yokogawara Line to Yokogawara Station. Trains arrive roughly every fifteen minutes.

== Stations ==
All stations are located in Matsuyama, Ehime Prefecture. Despite not being a railway station, Matsuyama Tourist Port Station is also given a number designation, IY00.

Number	Image	Name		Distance (km)	Connections
IY00		Matsuyama Tourist Port	松山観光港	-	Ferries to the Kutsuna Islands
IY01		Takahama	高浜	0.0	
IY02		Baishinji	梅津寺	1.2	
IY03		Minatoyama	港山	2.0	
IY04		Mitsu	三津	3.0	
IY05		Yamanishi	山西	4.0	
IY06		Nishi-Kinuyama	西衣山	5.1	
IY07		Kinuyama	衣山	6.0	
IY08		Komachi	古町	7.6	Iyotetsu Trams: ■Route 1, ■Route 2
IY09		Ōtemachi	大手町	8.5	Iyotetsu Trams: ■Route 1, ■Route 2, ■Route 5
IY10		Matsuyama City	松山市	9.4	Iyotetsu: ■Yokogawara Line (through service), ■Gunchū Line; Iyotetsu Trams: ■Route 1, ■Route 2, ■Route 4, ■Route 6

=== Ridership ===
No.	Station	Passengers (2023)
IY01	Takahama	928
IY02	Baishinji	289
IY03	Minatoyama	286
IY04	Mitsu	1,648
IY05	Yamanishi	2,106
IY06	Nishi-Kinuyama	1,163
IY07	Kinuyama	1,932
IY08	Komachi	4,148
IY09	Ōtemachi	2,270
IY10	Matsuyama City	16,305
