= Masaoka Shiki International Haiku Awards =

Haiku award

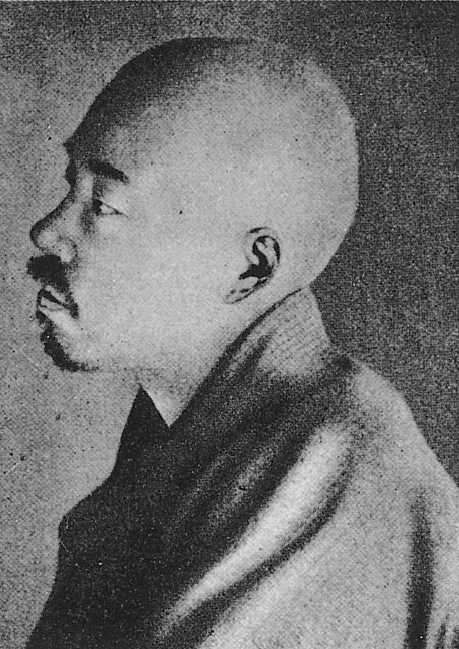
Photo of Masaoka Shiki (正岡子規), namesake of the awards

The Masaoka Shiki International Haiku Awards, named after the founder of modern Japanese haiku, were established on the principles set forth in the Matsuyama Declaration, adopted at the Shimanamikaido '99 Haiku Convention in Matsuyama held in September 1999. The establishment of this award attracts people's attention to Masaoka Shiki as a globally recognized poet and to haiku as a short form of world poetry.

== Purpose ==
The Masaoka Shiki International Haiku Award is awarded to people who have made the most remarkable contribution to the development and the raising awareness of the creativity of haiku regardless of nationality or language. Recipients have a strong interest in haiku and a broad, international outlook in their field. The award is not limited to any field of speciality, so that haiku poets, other poets, authors, researchers, translators, essayists, editors, and workers in all professions are considered equally.

== Awardees ==
- The First Masaoka Shiki International Haiku Awards 2000
  - Grand Prize/ Yves Bonnefoy, France
  - Haiku Prize/ Li Mang, China/ Bart Mesotten, Belgium/ Robert Spiess, United States of America
  - EIJS Special Award/ Kazuo Sato, Japan
- The Second Masaoka Shiki International Haiku Awards 2002
  - Haiku Prize/ Cor van den Heuvel, United States of America/Satya Bhushan Verma, India
  - EIJS Special Award/ Shigeki Wada, Japan
- The Third Masaoka Shiki International Haiku Awards 2004
  - Grand Prize/ Gary Snyder, United States of America
  - Haiku Prize/ Hidekazu Masuda, Brazil/Ko Reishi, Taiwan
  - EIJS Special Award/ Bansei Tsukushi, Japan
- The Fourth Masaoka Shiki International Haiku Awards 2008
  - Grand Prize/ Kaneko Tohta, Japan
  - Haiku Prize/ Kawahara Biwao, Japan
  - Haiku Prlze Sweden Award/ Uchida Sonoo, Japan/ Lee O-Young, South Korea
