= Akiyama Yoshifuru =

Japanese general (1859–1930)

- 秋山 好古
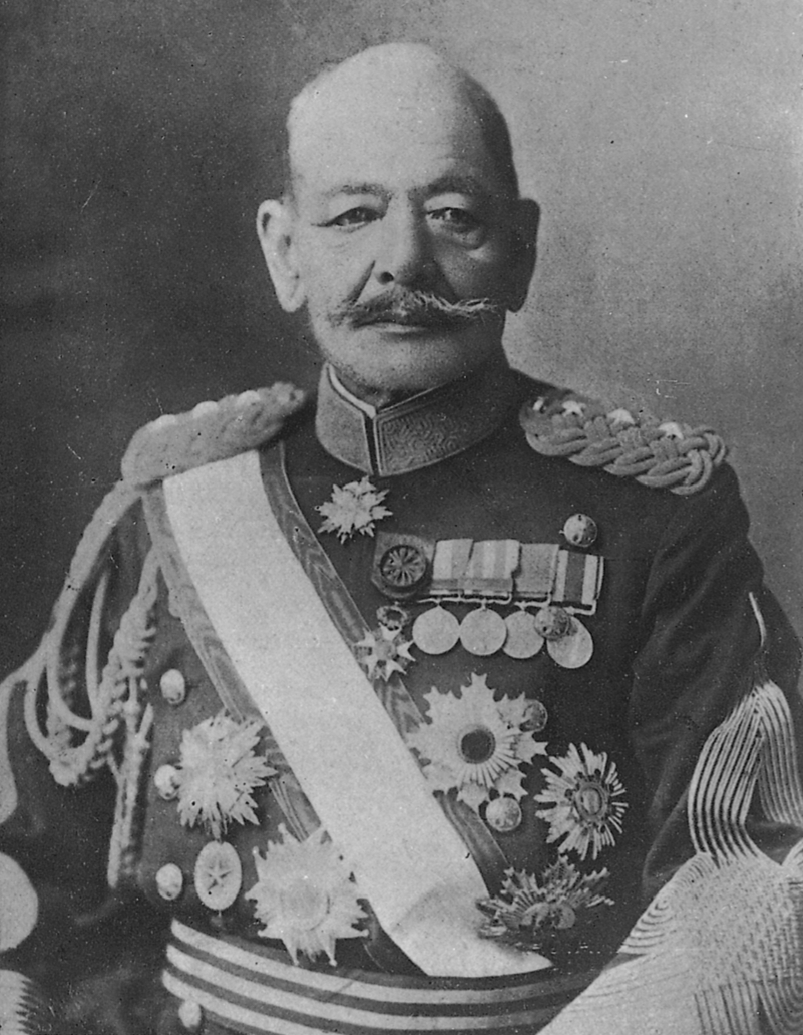
- Born: February 9, 1859; Matsuyama, Iyo, Japan
- Died: November 4, 1930 (aged 71); Matsuyama, Ehime, Japan
- Military career
- Allegiance: Japan
- Branch: Imperial Japanese Army
- Service years: 1877–1923
- Rank: Rikugun-Taishō (General)
- Commands: IJA 1st Division; IJA 5th Division
- Conflicts: First Sino-Japanese War; Boxer Rebellion; Russo-Japanese War
- Awards: Grand Cordon of the Order of the Paulownia Flowers; Grand Cordon of the Order of the Rising Sun; Grand Cordon of the Order of the Sacred Treasure; Order of the Golden Kite, 2nd Class; Grand Officer

Akiyama Yoshifuru (秋山 好古; February 9, 1859 – November 4, 1930) was a general in the Imperial Japanese Army, and was considered the father of modern Japanese cavalry. He was the older brother of Vice Admiral Akiyama Saneyuki.

== Biography ==
=== Early life ===
Born as the third son to a bankrupt samurai in the Matsuyama Domain, Iyo Province (modern Ehime Prefecture), Akiyama worked as a fire stoker and janitor in a local public bathhouse as a child.

Akiyama entered the Rikugun Shikan Gakkō (the forerunner of the Imperial Japanese Army Academy) in 1877. He went on to attend the Army Staff College, and was sent as a military attaché to France to study cavalry tactics and techniques. He was the only Japanese officer sent to study at the École spéciale militaire de Saint-Cyr at a time when the rest of the Japanese Army had turned to the Imperial German Army as its model and was being taught by instructors from Germany.

Akiyama was often mistaken for a European student by many foreign instructors such as Jakob Meckel while at the Japanese Army Academy. He was reputed to be a plain-living person who had a bowl of rice with slices of pickles for his meal. However, he spent his money on sake and was known to be a heavy drinker.

=== Military career ===
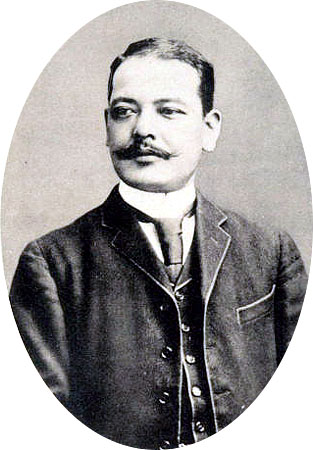
General Akiyama

Akiyama was active in the First Sino-Japanese War of 1894–1895 as a cavalry regimental commander in the IJA 1st Division, and served with Japanese expeditionary forces in the subsequent Boxer Rebellion with the IJA 5th Division. In the Russo-Japanese War of 1904–1905, he led his troops in the Battle of Shaho, Battle of Sandepu, and in the Battle of Mukden against the Cossack cavalry divisions of the Imperial Russian Army. In April 1906, he was awarded the Order of the Golden Kite (2nd class).

Akiyama became commander of the IJA 13th Division in 1913, and after his promotion to full general in 1916, was given command of the Imperial Guards Division. The following year, he was assigned command of the Chosen Army. In 1920, he became Director General for Military Education.

After he retired from active military service in 1923, declining promotion to Field Marshal, he returned to his native island of Shikoku and became the principal of the Hokuyō Junior High School (present-day Matsuyama High School). Akiyama died of complications from diabetes at the Army Medical School Hospital in Tokyo in 1930, and his grave is in the city of Matsuyama.

== Portrayals in fiction ==
Akiyama is one of the main characters of Saka no Ue no Kumo ("Clouds Over the Slope"), a novel by Ryōtarō Shiba, adapted as a historical drama on the Japanese television network NHK from 2009 to 2011. Akiyama was portrayed by actor Hiroshi Abe.

Akiyama inspired the character Dot Pixis in the manga series Attack on Titan. When series author, Hajime Isayama, stated this inspiration he received death threats and criticism regarding the general's actions in the military, primarily regarding elements of Akiyama's division's involvement in the Port Arthur Massacre.

== Honours ==
With translated material from the corresponding Japanese Wikipedia article

- Grand Cordon of the Order of the Rising Sun, Paulownia Flowers (1 November 1930, posthumous)
- Order of the Rising Sun, 1st class (29 November 1918)
- Order of the Sacred Treasure, 1st class (28 November 1913)
- Order of the Golden Kite, 2nd class (1 April 1906)
- Grand Officer of the Légion d'honneur
- Commander of the Order of Saints Maurice and Lazarus
- Order of the Red Eagle, 2nd class
- Order of Saint Stanislaus, 2nd Class
- Order of St. Anna, 2nd class

=== Order of precedence ===
- Senior eighth rank (5 June 1880)
- Seventh rank (7 April 1883)
- Senior seventh rank (188?)
- Sixth rank (11 January 1893)
- Senior sixth rank (24 March 1896)
- Fifth rank (30 October 1897)
- Senior fifth rank (20 October 1902)
- Fourth rank (11 November 1907)
- Senior fourth rank (28 December 1912)
- Third rank (31 January 1916)
- Senior third rank (10 March 1919)
- Second rank (30 April 1923)
