= Masaoka Shiki =

Japanese poet, author, and literary critic (1867-1902)

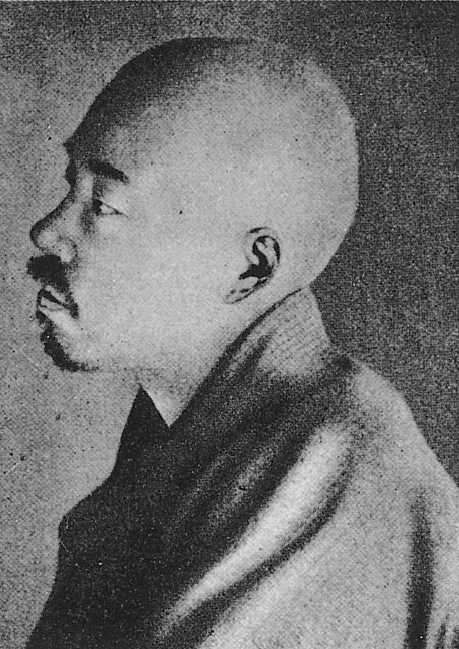
- Masaoka Shiki c. 1900
- Born: October 14, 1867; Matsuyama, Ehime, Japan
- Died: September 19, 1902 (age 34); Tokyo, Japan
- Occupations: Writer, journalist
- Parent: Masaoka Tsunenao

Masaoka Shiki (正岡 子規; Japanese pronunciation: [ma.saꜜ.o.ka | ɕi̥.kʲiꜜ, -sa.o.ka ɕi̥.kʲiꜜ], October 14, 1867 – September 19, 1902), pen-name of Masaoka Noboru (正岡 升), was a Japanese poet, author, and literary critic in Meiji period Japan. Shiki is regarded as a major figure in the development of modern haiku poetry, credited with writing nearly 20,000 stanzas during his short life. He also wrote on reform of tanka poetry.

Some consider Masaoka to be one of the four great haiku masters, the others being Matsuo Bashō, Yosa Buson, and Kobayashi Issa.

== Early life ==
Shiki, or rather Tsunenori (常規) as he was originally named, was born in Matsuyama City in Iyo Province (present day Ehime Prefecture) to a samurai class family of modest means. As a child, he was called Tokoronosuke (處之助); in adolescence, his name was changed to Noboru (升).

His father, Tsunenao (正岡常尚), was an alcoholic who died when Shiki was five years of age. His mother, Yae, was a daughter of Ōhara Kanzan, a Confucian scholar. Kanzan was the first of Shiki's extra-school tutors; at the age of 7 the boy began reading Mencius under his tutelage. Shiki later confessed to being a less-than-diligent student.

At age 15 Shiki became something of a political radical, attaching himself to the then-waning Freedom and People's Rights Movement and getting himself banned from public speaking by the principal of Matsuyama Middle School, which he was attending. Around this time he developed an interest in moving to Tokyo and did so in 1883.

== Education ==
The young Shiki first attended his hometown Matsuyama Middle School, where Kusama Tokiyoshi, a leader of the discredited Freedom and People's Rights Movement, had recently served as principal. In 1883, a maternal uncle arranged for him to come to Tokyo. Shiki was first enrolled in Kyōritsu Middle School and later matriculated into University Preparatory School. (Daigaku Yobimon) affiliated with Imperial University (Teikoku Daigaku). While studying here, the teenage Shiki enjoyed playing baseball and befriended fellow student Natsume Sōseki, who would go on to become a famous novelist.

He entered Tokyo Imperial University in 1890. But by 1892 Shiki, by his own account too engrossed in haiku writing, failed his final examinations, left the Hongō dormitory that had been provided to him by a scholarship, and dropped out of college. Others say tuberculosis, an illness that dogged his later life, was the reason he left school.

== Literary career ==
While Shiki is best known as a haiku poet, he wrote other genres of poetry, prose criticism of poetry, autobiographical prose, and was a short prose essayist. (His earliest surviving work is a school essay, Yōken Setsu ("On Western Dogs"), where he praises the varied utility of western dogs as opposed to Japanese ones, which "only help in hunting and scare away burglars.")

Contemporary to Shiki was the idea that traditional Japanese poetic short forms, such as the haiku and tanka, were waning due to their incongruity in the modern Meiji period. Shiki, at times, expressed similar sentiments. There were no great living practitioners although these forms of poetry retained some popularity.

Despite an atmosphere of decline, only a year or so after his 1883 arrival in Tokyo, Shiki began writing haiku. In 1892, the same year he dropped out of university, Shiki published a serialized work advocating haiku reform, Dassai Shooku Haiwa or "Talks on Haiku from the Otter's Den". A month after completion of this work, in November 1892, he was offered a position as haiku editor in the paper that had published it, Nippon, and maintained a close relationship with this journal throughout his life. In 1895 another serial was published in the same paper, "A Text on Haikai for Beginners", Haikai Taiyō. These were followed by other serials: Meiji Nijūkunen no Haikukai or "The Haiku World of 1896" where he praised works by disciples Takahama Kyoshi and Kawahigashi Hekigotō, Haijin Buson or "The Haiku Poet Buson" (1896–1897) expressing Shiki's idea of this 18th-century poet whom he identifies with his school of haiku, and Utayomi ni Atauru Sho or "Letters to a Tanka Poet" (1898) where he urged reform of the tanka poetry form.

The above work, on tanka, is an example of Shiki's expanded focus during the last few years of his life. He died four years after taking up tanka as a topic. Bedsore and morphine-addled, little more than a year before his death Shiki began writing sickbed diaries. These three are Bokujū Itteki or "A Drop of Ink" (1901), Gyōga Manroku or "Stray Notes While Lying on My Back" (1901–1902), and Byōshō Rokushaku or "A Sixfoot Sickbed" (1902).

== Later life ==
Shiki suffered from tuberculosis (TB) much of his life. In 1888 or 1889 he began coughing up blood and soon adopted the pen-name "Shiki" from the Japanese hototogisu—the Japanese name for lesser cuckoos. The Japanese word hototogisu can be written with various combinations of Chinese characters, including 子規, which can alternatively be read as either "hototogisu" or "shiki". It is a Japanese conceit that this bird coughs blood as it sings, hence the pen-name "Shiki" (as a symptom of TB is coughing blood).

Suffering from the early symptoms of TB, Shiki sought work as a war correspondent in the First Sino-Japanese War and, while eventually obtaining his goal, he arrived in China after the April 17, 1895 signing of the Treaty of Shimonoseki. Instead of reporting on the war, he spent an unpleasant time harassed by Japanese soldiers in Dalian, Luangtao, and the Lüshunkou District. He also met the famous novelist Mori Ōgai on May 10, 1895, who was at the time an army doctor.

Living in filthy conditions in China apparently worsened his TB. Shiki continued to cough blood throughout his return voyage to Japan and was hospitalized in Kobe. After being discharged, he returned to his home town of Matsuyama city and convalesced in the home of the famed novelist Natsume Sōseki. During this time he took on disciples and promulgated a style of haiku that emphasized gaining inspiration from personal experiences of nature. Still in Matsuyama in 1897, a member of this group, Yanigihara Kyokudō, established a haiku magazine, Hototogisu, an allusion to Shiki's pen name. Operation of this magazine was quickly moved to Tokyo. Takahama Kyoshi, another disciple, assumed control and the magazine's scope was extended to include prose work.

Shiki came to Tokyo, and his group of disciples there were known as the "Nippon school" after the paper where he had been haiku editor and that now published the group's work.

Although bedridden by 1897, Shiki's disease worsened further around 1901. He developed Pott's disease and began using morphine as a painkiller. By 1902 he may have been relying heavily on the drug. During this time Shiki wrote three autobiographical works. He died of tuberculosis in 1902 at age 34.

== Legacy ==
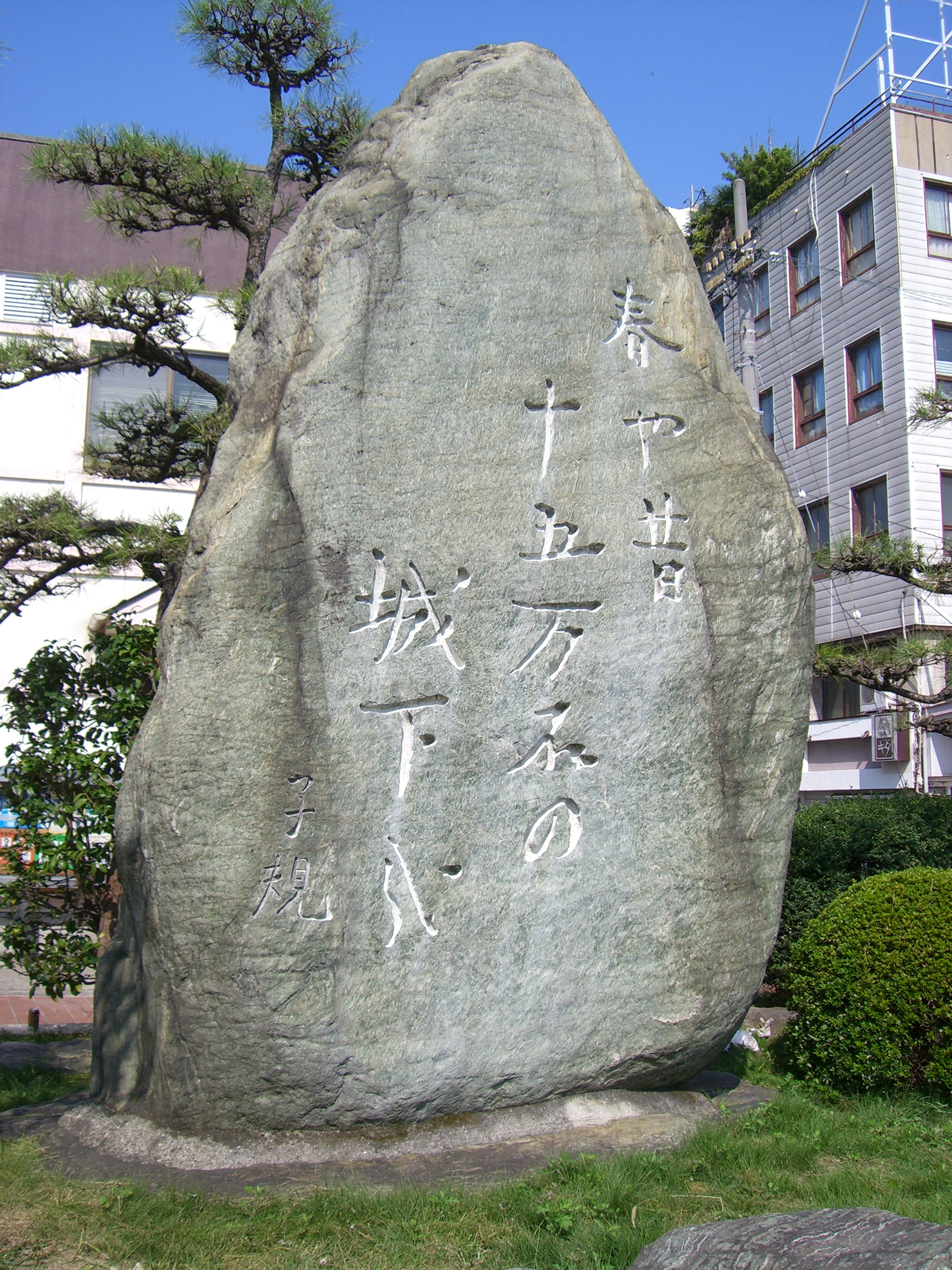
A monument containing a haiku by Shiki, in front of Matsuyama Station

Shiki may be credited with salvaging traditional short-form Japanese poetry and carving out a niche for it in the modern Meiji period. While he advocated reform of haiku, this reform was based on the idea that haiku was a legitimate literary genre. He argued that haiku should be judged by the same yardstick that is used when measuring the value of other forms of literature — something that was contrary to views held by prior poets. Shiki firmly placed haiku in the category of literature, and this was unique.

Some modern haiku deviate from the traditional 5–7–5 sound pattern and dispensing with the kigo ("season word"); Shiki's haiku reform advocated neither break with tradition.

His particular style rejected "the puns or fantasies often relied on by the old school" in favor of "realistic observation of nature". Shiki, like other Meiji period writers, borrowed a dedication to realism from Western literature. This is evident in his approach to both haiku and tanka.

=== Baseball ===
Shiki played baseball as a teenager and was inducted into the Japanese Baseball Hall of Fame in 2002. A group of 1898 tanka by him mention the sport.

== See also ==
- Masaoka Shiki International Haiku Awards
- Shiki Memorial Museum
- Samukawa Sokotsu
