= Hanazono Line =

Light rail line in Matsuyama, Ehime

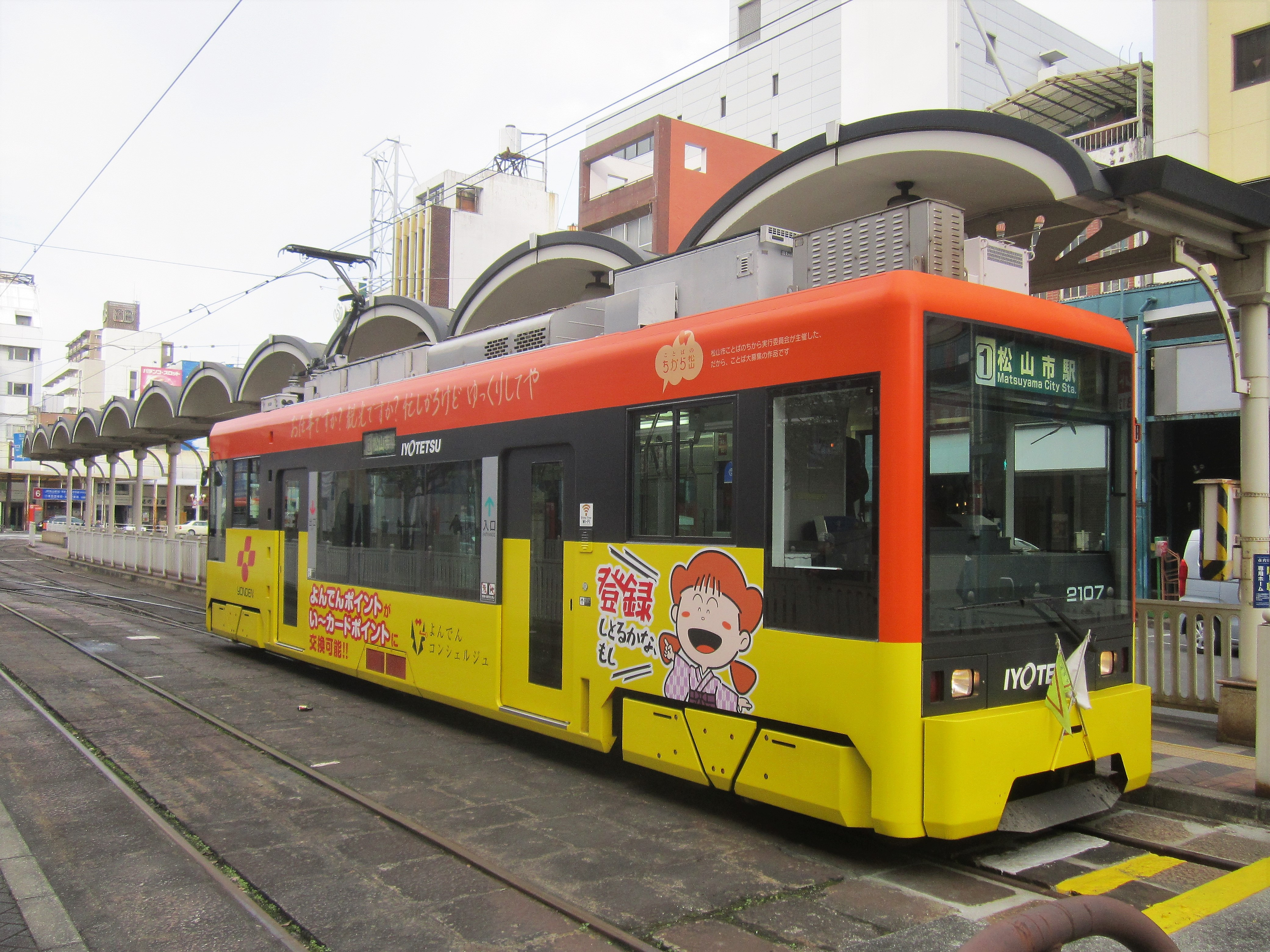
- A train at Matsuyama City Station

Overview
- Native name: 花園線
- Owner: Iyotetsu
- Locale: Matsuyama, Ehime Prefecture
- Termini: Matsuyama City; Minami-Horibata
- Stations: 2
- Website: http://www.iyotetsu.co.jp

Service
- Type: Light rail

History
- Opened: 25 March 1947

Technical
- Line length: 0.4 km (0.25 mi)
- Track gauge: 1,067 mm (3 ft 6 in)
- Electrification: 600 V DC Overhead

The Hanazono Line (花園線, Hanazono-sen) is a 0.4 km (0.25 mi) light rail line owned by Iyotetsu. The line runs entirely within the city of Matsuyama, Ehime Prefecture, Japan. Opened in 1947, the line connects Iyotetsu's heavy rail hub at Matsuyama City Station to the rest of the light rail network.

== Operations ==
The line is electrified and is double-tracked for the entire line. Four light rail services, along with the heritage railway train Botchan, run on the line.

Service	Route
1	Matsuyama City - JR Matsuyama - Kami-Ichiman - Matsuyama City
2	Matsuyama City - Kami-Ichiman - JR Matsuyama - Matsuyama City
3	Matsuyama City - Kami-Ichiman - Dōgo Onsen
6	Matsuyama City - Honmachi-Rokuchōme

== Stations ==
: Stations served by the heritage railway train Botchan

Number	Name		Distance (km)	Services				Connections
25	Matsuyama City	松山市駅前	-	1	2	3	6	■ Takahama Line, ■ Yokogawara Line, ■ Gunchū Line
26	Minami-Horibata	南堀端	0.6	1	2	3	6	5 Jōnan Line, Honmachi Line
