= Ōtemachi Line =

Light rail line in Matsuyama, Ehime

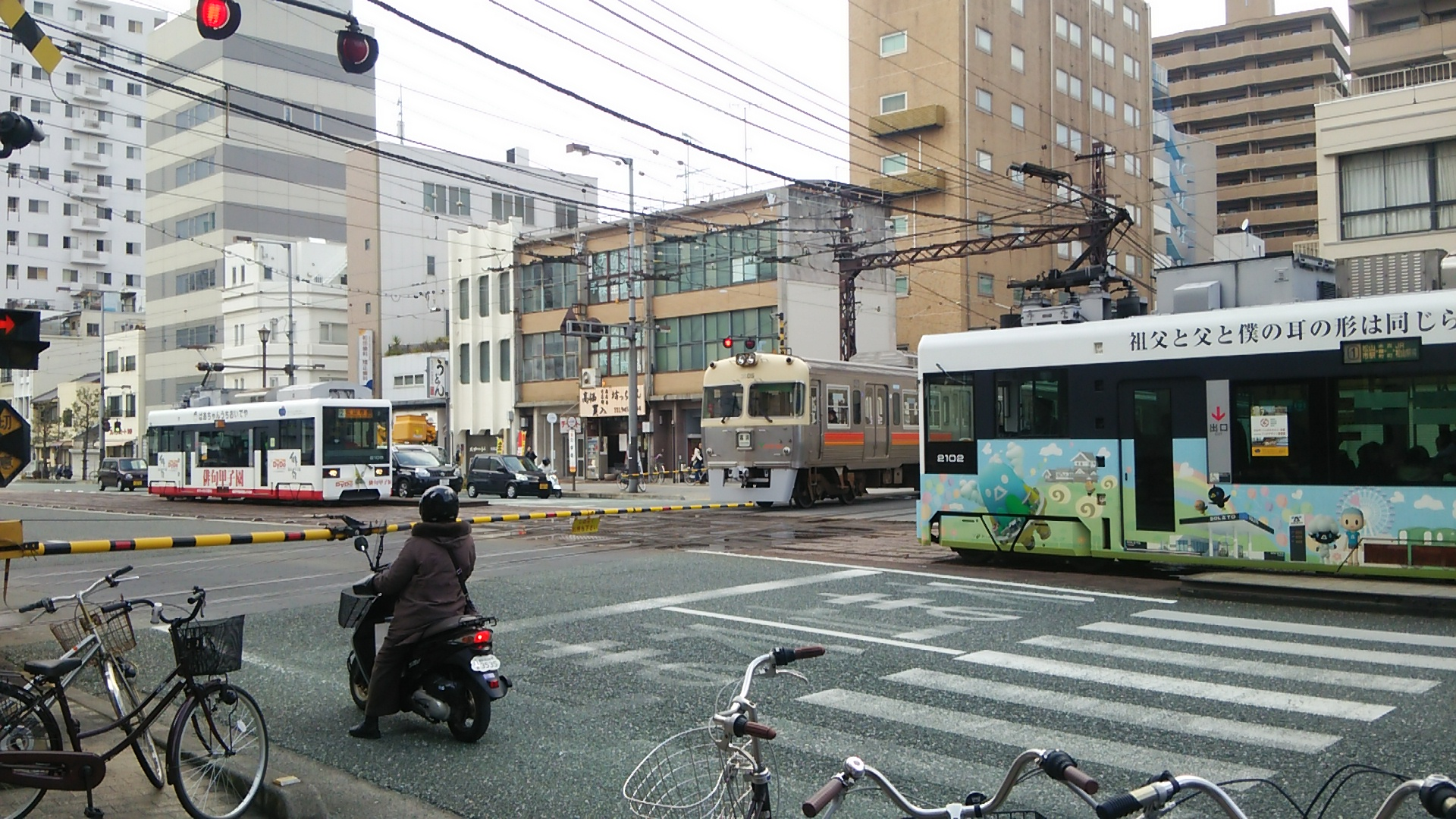
- Level junction at Ōtemachi Station

Overview
- Native name: 大手町線
- Owner: Iyotetsu
- Locale: Matsuyama, Ehime Prefecture
- Termini: Komachi; Nishi-Horibata
- Stations: 5
- Website: http://www.iyotetsu.co.jp

Service
- Type: Light rail

History
- Opened: 1 May 1936

Technical
- Line length: 1.4 km (0.87 mi)
- Track gauge: 1,067 mm (3 ft 6 in)
- Electrification: Overhead line, DC 600 V

The Ōtemachi Line (大手町線, Ōtemachi-sen) is a 1.4 km light rail line owned by Iyotetsu. The line runs entirely within the city of Matsuyama, Ehime Prefecture, Japan.

== Operations ==
The line is electrified with overhead lines and is double-tracked for the entire line. Three light rail services, along with the heritage railway train Botchan, serve this line.

Service	Route
1	Matsuyama City - JR Matsuyama - Kami-Ichiman - Matsuyama City
2	Matsuyama City - Kami-Ichiman - JR Matsuyama - Matsuyama City
5	JR Matsuyama - Kami-Ichiman - Dōgo Onsen

== Stations ==
: Stations served by the heritage railway train Botchan

Number	Name		Distance (km)	Services			Connections
07	Komachi	古町	-	1	2		■ Takahama Line, Jōhoku Line
06	Miyatachō	宮田町	0.4	1	2		
05	JR Matsuyama	JR松山駅前	0.8	1	2	5	JR Shikoku: Yosan Line (via Matsuyama Station)
04	Ōtemachi	大手町駅前	1.1	1	2	5	■ Takahama Line
03	Nishi-Horibata	西堀端	1.4	1	2	5	Jōnan Line, 6 Honmachi Line (via Honmachi-Itchōme Station)
