= Okada Station =

Okada Station (岡田駅) is the name of two train stations in Japan:

- Okada Station (Ehime)
- Okada Station (Kagawa)
