= Kamata Station =

Kamata Station can refer to multiple train stations in Japan:

- Kamata Station (Tokyo), an interchange train station located in Ōta in Tokyo, Japan, served by the Keihin-Tōhoku Line, Tōkyū Tamagawa Line, and Tōkyū Ikegami Line
- Keikyū Kamata Station, a railway station located in Ōta in Tokyo, Japan, operated by Keihin Electric Express Railway (Keikyū)
- Kamata Station (Ehime), a station in Ehime Prefecture served by the Iyo Railway Gunchū Line
