= Jonan =

- Jōnan-ku, Fukuoka, ward in Fukuoka, Japan
- Jōnan Line, light rail line in Matsuyama, Japan
- Ignasius Jonan, Indonesian politician
- 21254 Jonan, minor planet
