= Gunchū =

Gunchū is the historic name of Iyo, Ehime, a city in Japan.

Gunchū may also refer to:

- Gunchū Line, railway line operated by Iyotetsu in Ehime
- Gunchū Station, railway station in Iyo
- Gunchū Port Station, railway station in Iyo
