= Jōhoku Line =

Jōhoku Line (城北線, Jōhoku-sen) may refer to the following Japanese railway lines:

- Iyotetsu Jōhoku Line, a light rail line operated by Iyotetsu in Matsuyama, Ehime Prefecture
- Meitetsu Jōhoku Line, a former name of the current Meitetsu Komaki Line in Aichi Prefecture
- JR-Central Transport Service Jōhoku Line, operated by JR-Central Transport Service Company in Aichi Prefecture
