= Jōnan Line =

Light rail line in Matsuyama, Ehime

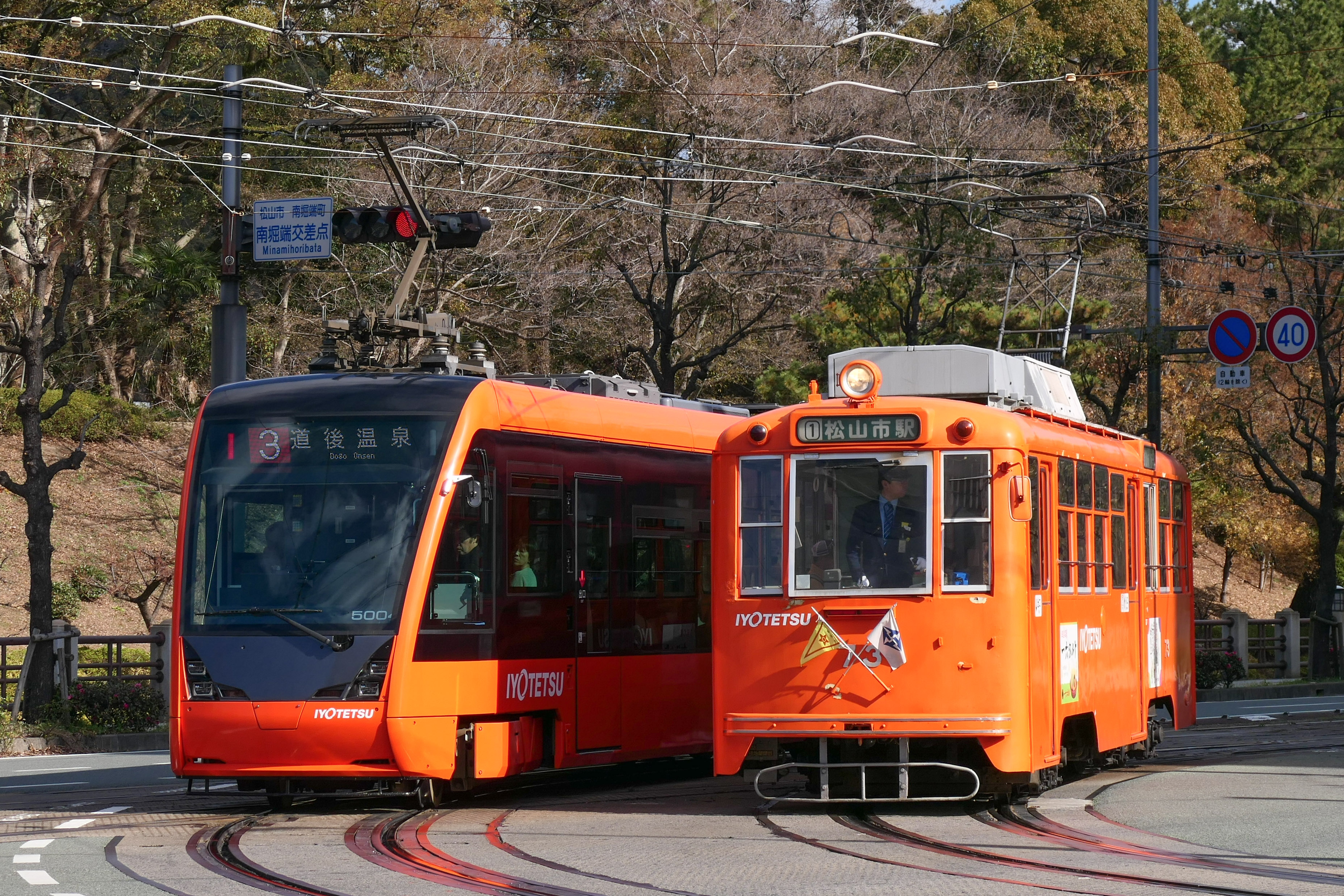
- A train near Minami-Horibata Station

Overview
- Native name: 城南線
- Owner: Iyotetsu
- Locale: Matsuyama, Ehime Prefecture
- Termini: Dōgo Onsen; Nishi-Horibata
- Stations: 11
- Website: http://www.iyotetsu.co.jp

Service
- Type: Light rail

History
- Opened: 11 September 1911

Technical
- Line length: 3.5 km
- Track gauge: 1,067 mm (3 ft 6 in)
- Electrification: Overhead line, DC 600 V

The Jōnan Line (城南線, Jōnan-sen) is a light rail line owned by Iyotetsu. The line is composed of a main line between Dōgo Onsen and Nishi-Horibata and a branch line between Heiwadōri 1-chōme and Kamiichiman. The two lines runs entirely within the city of Matsuyama, Ehime Prefecture, Japan.

== History ==
The Jōnan Line was built in 1911 by the Matsuyama Electric Railway (松山電気軌道), who ran electric trams on a 1,435 mm (4 ft 8 1/2 in) track. The Matsuyama Electric Railway was merged with Iyotetsu in 1921, who continued to operate the line. In 1923, the tracks were converted from 1435 mm to 1,067 mm (3 ft 6 in).

== Operations ==
The line is electrified with overhead lines. The main line is double-tracked, while the branch line is single-tracked. Five light rail services, along with the heritage railway train Botchan, run on the line.

Service	Route
1	Matsuyama City - JR Matsuyama - Kami-Ichiman - Matsuyama City
2	Matsuyama City - Kami-Ichiman - JR Matsuyama - Matsuyama City
3	Matsuyama City - Kami-Ichiman - Dōgo Onsen
5	JR Matsuyama - Kami-Ichiman - Dōgo Onsen

== Stations ==
: Stations served by the heritage railway train Botchan

Number	Name		Distance (km)	Services				Connections
24	Dōgo Onsen	道後温泉	-			3	5	
23	Dōgo Park	道後公園	0.3			3	5	
22	Minamimachi	南町	0.8			3	5	
16	Kami-Ichiman	上一万	1.2	1	2	3	5	1 2 Renraku Line
17	Police Station	警察署前	1.5	1	2	3	5	
18	Katsuyamachō	勝山町	1.8	1	2	3	5	
19	Ōkaidō	大街道	2.2	1	2	3	5	
20	Ehime Prefectural Office	県庁前	2.6	1	2	3	5	
21	Matsuyama City Hall	市役所前	2.8	1	2	3	5	
02	Minami-Horibata	南堀端	3.1	1	2	3	5	1 2 3 6 Hanazono Line, 6 Honmachi Line
03/25	Nishi-Horibata	西堀端	3.5	1	2		5	1 2 5 Ōtemachi Line
