= Jōhoku Line (Iyotetsu) =

Light rail line in Matsuyama, Ehime

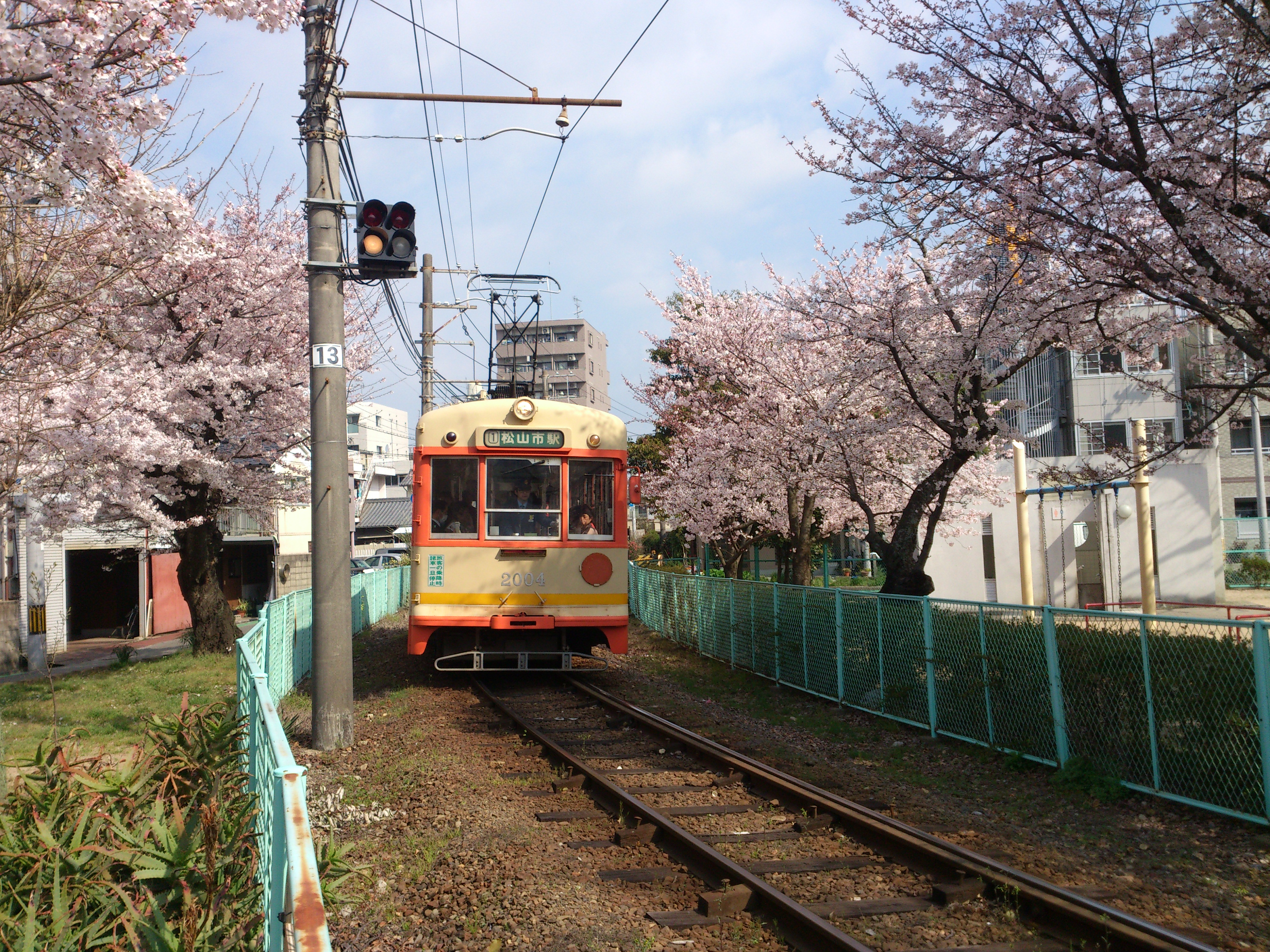
- A train near Shimizumachi Station

Overview
- Native name: 城北線
- Owner: Iyotetsu
- Locale: Matsuyama, Ehime Prefecture
- Termini: Komachi; Heiwadōri-Itchōme
- Stations: 9
- Website: http://www.iyotetsu.co.jp

Service
- Type: Light rail

History
- Opened: 22 August 1895

Technical
- Line length: 2.7 km (1.7 mi)
- Track gauge: 1,067 mm (3 ft 6 in)
- Electrification: Overhead line, DC 600 V

The Jōhoku Line (城北線, Jōhoku-sen) is a 2.7 km light rail line owned by Iyotetsu. The line runs entirely within the city of Matsuyama, Ehime Prefecture, Japan.

While Iyotetsu only operates light rail trains on the tram, the line is legally classified as a heavy rail line.

== History ==
The Jōhoku Line was built in 1895 by Dōgō Railway (道後鉄道, Dōgo-tetsudō) as a 762 mm (2 ft 6 in) gauge railway that ran steam locomotives. Dōgō Railway was merged with Iyotetsu in 1900, who continued to operate its rail line as Dōgo Line (道後線, Dōgo-sen). In 1911, the line was converted into 1,067 mm (3 ft 6 in) railway and electrified.

In 1927, Jōhoku Line between Kiyachō and Ichiman (current Kami-Ichiman) opened and a part of Dōgo Line between Komachi and Kiyachō became a part of Jōhoku Line. Another part of Dōgo Line was closed until then. In 1969, between the Heiwadōri and Kami-Ichiman became a branch of Jōnan Line (renamed to Renraku Line in 2018).

== Operations ==
The line is electrified with overhead lines and is single-tracked for the entire line. Two light rail services, route 1 and route 2, run on the line.

Service	Route
1	Matsuyama City - JR Matsuyama - Kami-Ichiman - Matsuyama City
2	Matsuyama City - Kami-Ichiman - JR Matsuyama - Matsuyama City

== Stations ==
: Stations served by the heritage railway train Botchan

Number	Name		Distance (km)	Services		Connections
07	Komachi	古町	-	1	2	■ Takahama Line, Ōtemachi Line
08	Kayamachi-Rokuchōme	萱町六丁目	0.5	1	2	
09/29	Honmachi-Rokuchōme	本町六丁目	0.9	1	2	6 Honmachi Line
10	Kiyachō	木屋町	1.1	1	2	
11	Takasagochō	高砂町	1.4	1	2	
12	Shimizumachi	清水町	1.8	1	2	
13	Teppōchō	鉄砲町	2.2	1	2	
14	Red Cross Hospital	赤十字病院前	2.5	1	2	
15	Heiwadōri-Itchōme	平和通一丁目	2.7	1	2	Renraku Line
