= Honmachi Line =

Light rail line in Matsuyama, Ehime

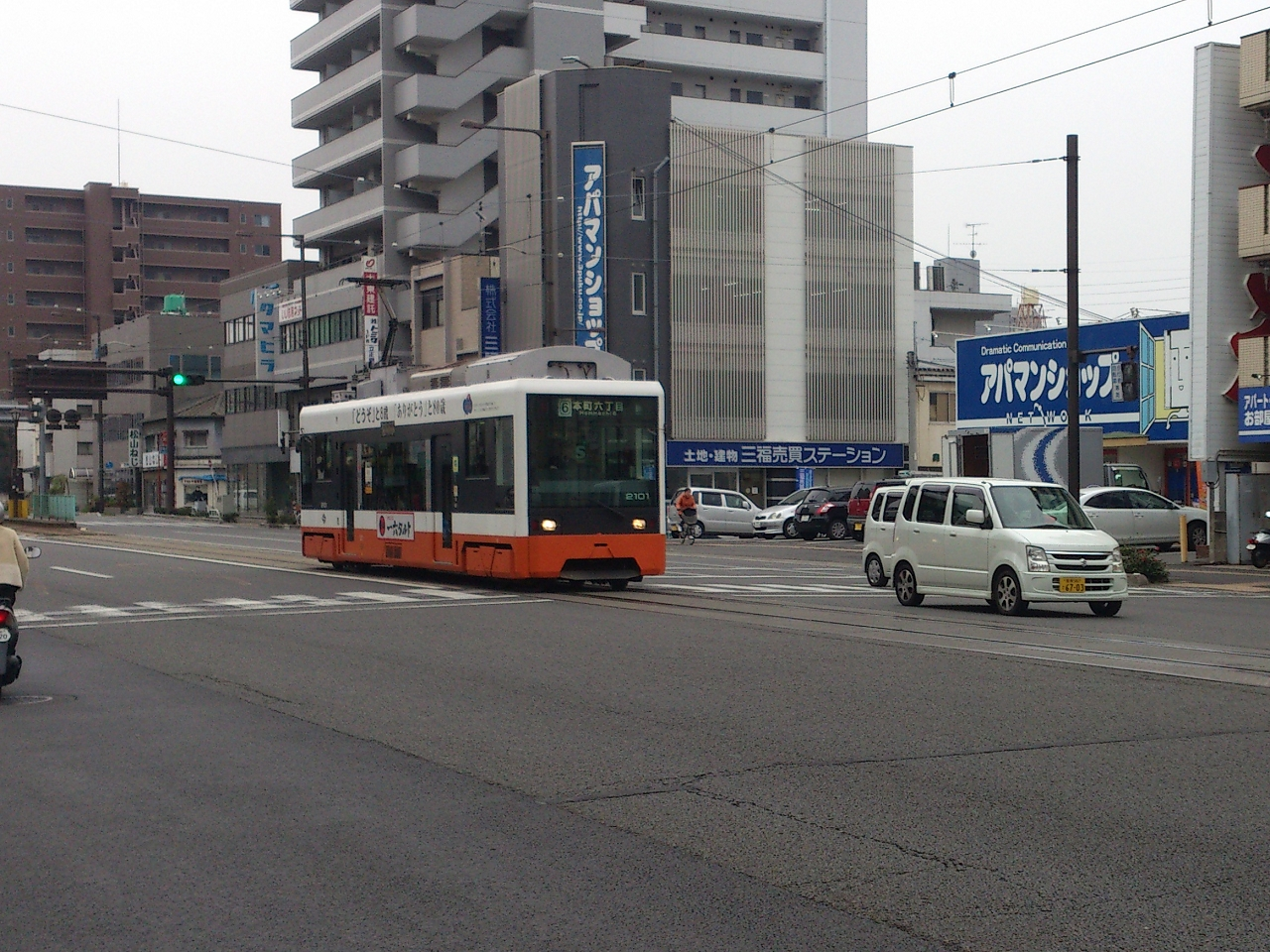
- A train near Honmachi-Gochōme Station

Overview
- Native name: 本町線
- Owner: Iyotetsu
- Locale: Matsuyama, Ehime Prefecture
- Termini: Minami-Horibata; honmachi-Rokuchōme
- Stations: 6

Service
- Type: Light rail

History
- Opened: 1 September 1911

Technical
- Line length: 1.9 km (1.2 mi)
- Track gauge: 1,067 mm (3 ft 6 in)

The Honmachi Line (本町線, Honmachi-sen) is a 1.5 km light rail line owned by Iyotetsu. The line runs entirely within the city of Matsuyama, Ehime Prefecture, Japan.

== History ==
The Honmachi Line was built in 1911 by the Matsuyama Electric Railway (松山電気軌道), who ran electric trams on a 1,435 mm (4 ft 8 1/2 in) track. The Matsuyama Electric Railway was merged with Iyotetsu in 1921, who continued to operate the line. In 1923, the tracks were converted from 1435 mm to 1,067 mm (3 ft 6 in). The line was briefly closed in 1945 due to damages from air raids in the Second World War, but was restored in 1948.

== Operations ==
The line is electrified and is single-tracked for the entire line. There are no passing loops on the line.

The line only operates on weekday mornings.

| Service | Route |
|---|---|
| 6 | Matsuyama City – Honmachi-Rokuchōme |

== Stations ==
| Number | Name | | Distance (km) | Services | Connections |
|---|---|---|---|---|---|
| 02 | Minami-Horibata | 南堀端 | - | 6 | 1 2 5 Jōnan Line |
| 25 | Honmachi-Itchōme | 本町一丁目 | 0.4 | 6 | |
| 26 | Honmachi-Sanchōme | 本町三丁目 | 1.0 | 6 | |
| 27 | Honmachi-Yonchōme | 本町四丁目 | 1.3 | 6 | |
| 28 | Honmachi-Gochōme | 本町五丁目 | 1.6 | 6 | |
| 29/09 | Honmachi-Rokuchōme | 本町六丁目 | 1.9 | 6 | 1 2 Jōhoku Line |
