= Mitsuhama, Ehime =

Dissolved municipality in Ehime prefecture, Japan

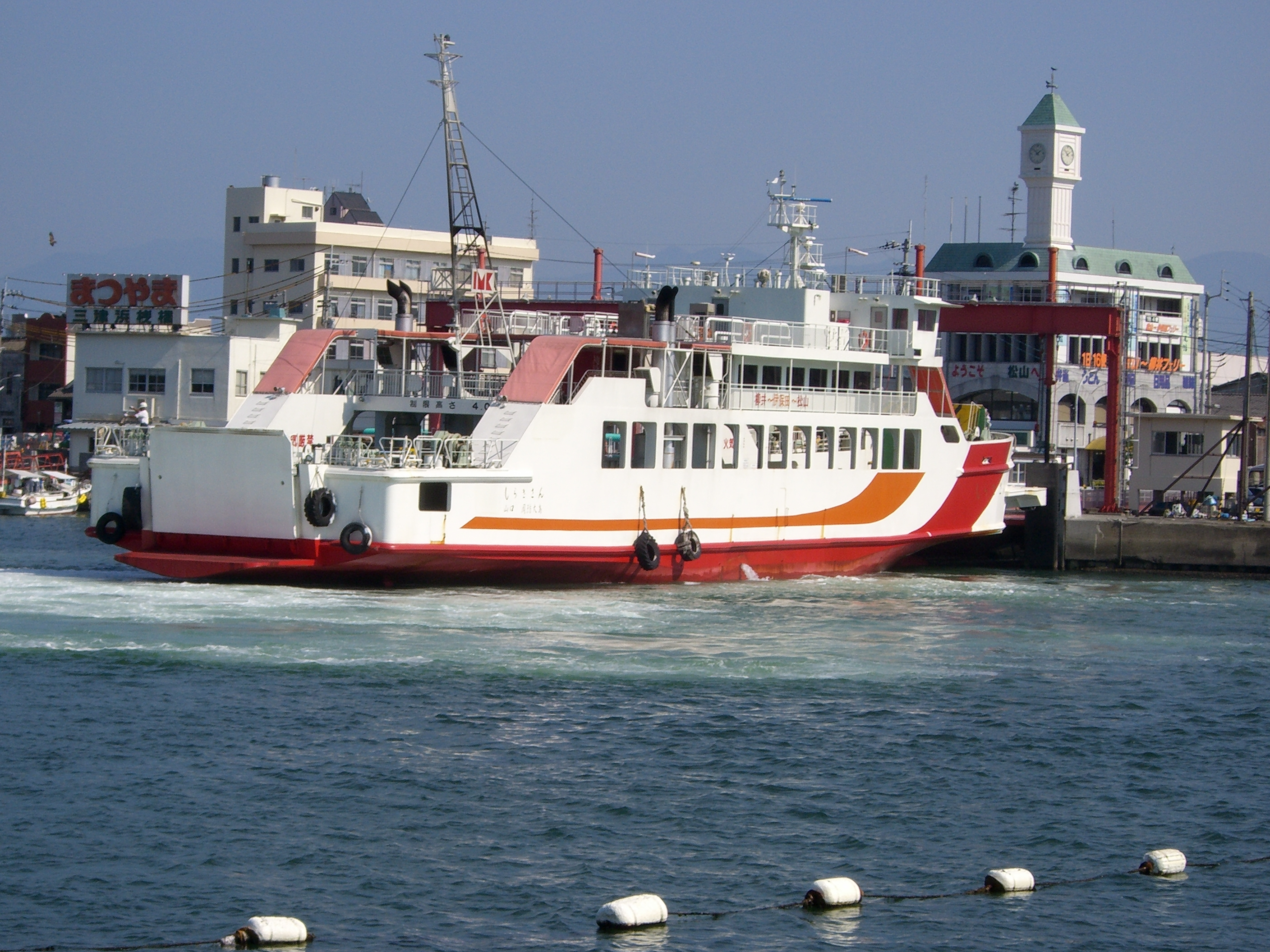
A ferry at Mitsuhama port

Mitsuhama (三津浜), formerly also known as Mitsugahama, is former town of Matsuyama, Ehime, Japan. The port operates local ferries.

In October, 1888, the Iyotetsu light railway line connecting Mitsuhama with Matsuyama began operation.

Mitsuhama absorbed the village of Furumitsu in 1925 and Shinhama in 1937. In 1940 Mitsuhama was merged into the city of Matsuyama.
