= Osman Edwards =

British writer

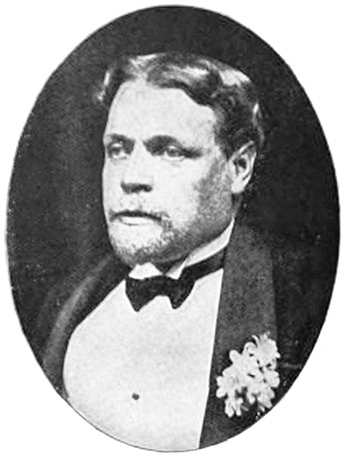
- Osman Edwards 1902
- Born: 18 February 1864; Liverpool, England
- Died: 30 April 1936 (aged 72); London, England
- Writing career
- Language: English, Greek, Danish, Japanese, French

Osman Edwards (18 February 1864 – 30 April 1936) was a British writer, translator, and critic, best known for his works introducing European and Japanese drama to English readers.

== Early life ==
Osman Edwards was born in Liverpool, England, on 18 February 1864 and died in London on 30 April 1936. His father, Osman Frederick Adams Edwards, was a captain in the British army. Edwards studied classics at Christ's Hospital and became a master at Merton College, Oxford, from 1883 to 1887 and then at the Reading School from 1889 to 1891.

According to Frederic Sharf, "Edwards had a private income, enabling him to leave his teaching responsibilities and embark on a ten-year period of extensive travel to France, Germany, Norway, Russia, and Japan." He studied the national theatrical arts of the countries he visited, contributed articles to English magazines on dramatic subjects, and translated plays and other theatre-related writings from European languages into English, including Short Studies of Theatrical Life (from the French of Alphonse Daudet, 1892), and A Gauntlet (from the Norwegian of Bjørnstjerne Bjørnson, 1894).

== Japan visit ==
Edwards arrived in Japan in 1898 for a six-month stay, during which he wrote articles on Japanese theatre for The Sketch and The Studio. From Tokyo, where he watched a sumo match on 1 July, Edwards traveled to Ikaho and Akabane, where he joined a traveller he had met three months earlier at a Kyoto curio shop; together they traveled to Karuizawa and Akakura, arriving in Osaka and Kobe in October, then traveled by rail to Onomichi, by steamer to Miyajima, and by ship to Matsuyama, Ehime, before returning by ship to Kobe. By November 1898, Edwards had left for England, traveling by way of Hawaii, the United States, and France. Lafcadio Hearn wrote Mary Fenollosa "I see Mr. Edwards has gone; and I am sorry to think that I may never see him again" in November 1898.

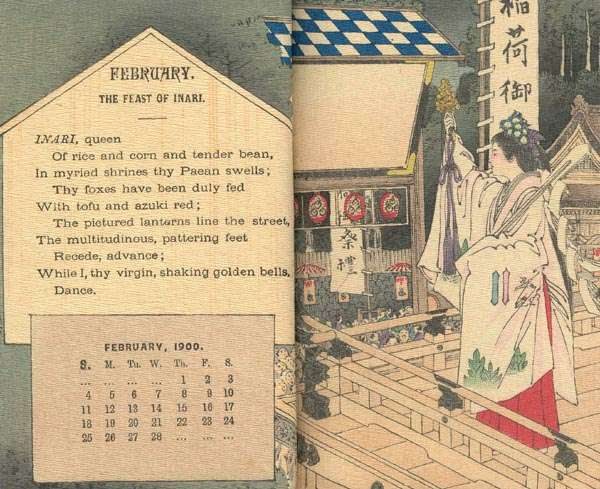
Japanese Calendar with Verses: February

While in Japan, Edwards authored three small books for Hasegawa Takejirō. According to Scharf, it was Basil Hall Chamberlain who introduced Edwards to Hasegawa, and "this introduction led to a collaboration that resulted in three publications in a very short period of time. Edwards translated the French text of Jules Adam's book on Japanese storytellers, enabling Hasegawa to issue it in English under the title Japanese Story-Tellers. At the same time, Edwards was writing the text for Residential Rhymes, a humorous yet accurate depiction of Japan's foreign residents during the Meiji period," which Sharf calls "arguably Hasegawa's finest publication." And "Edwards also prepared twelve poems for the Calendar with Verses that Hasegawa wanted to issue for the year 1900." All three books were published in autumn 1899, in the hope of sales at the Japanese exhibit in Paris at the Exposition Universelle of 1900.

== Plays and Playfellows ==
Edwards sent Lafcadio Hearn an Émile Verhaeren book from Paris in 1899 and continued to correspond with Hearn for several years. Shortly after his return to London, he lectured to the Japan Society of London on "Japanese Theatres." In the fall of 1899, he was instrumental in arranging performances of the Kawakami Theatre Company in London.

In 1901 London publisher William Heinemann published Edwards' best-known work, a combined Japan travelogue and study of Japanese entertainment entitled Japanese Plays and Playfellows.

== Later life ==
Although Edwards published relatively little in his later years, he remained an active member of the Playgoers Club (serving as vice-president in 1903), and the Japan Society of London for many years.

He died in London on 30 April 1936.
