= Yokogawara Line =

Railway line in Ehime Prefecture, Japan

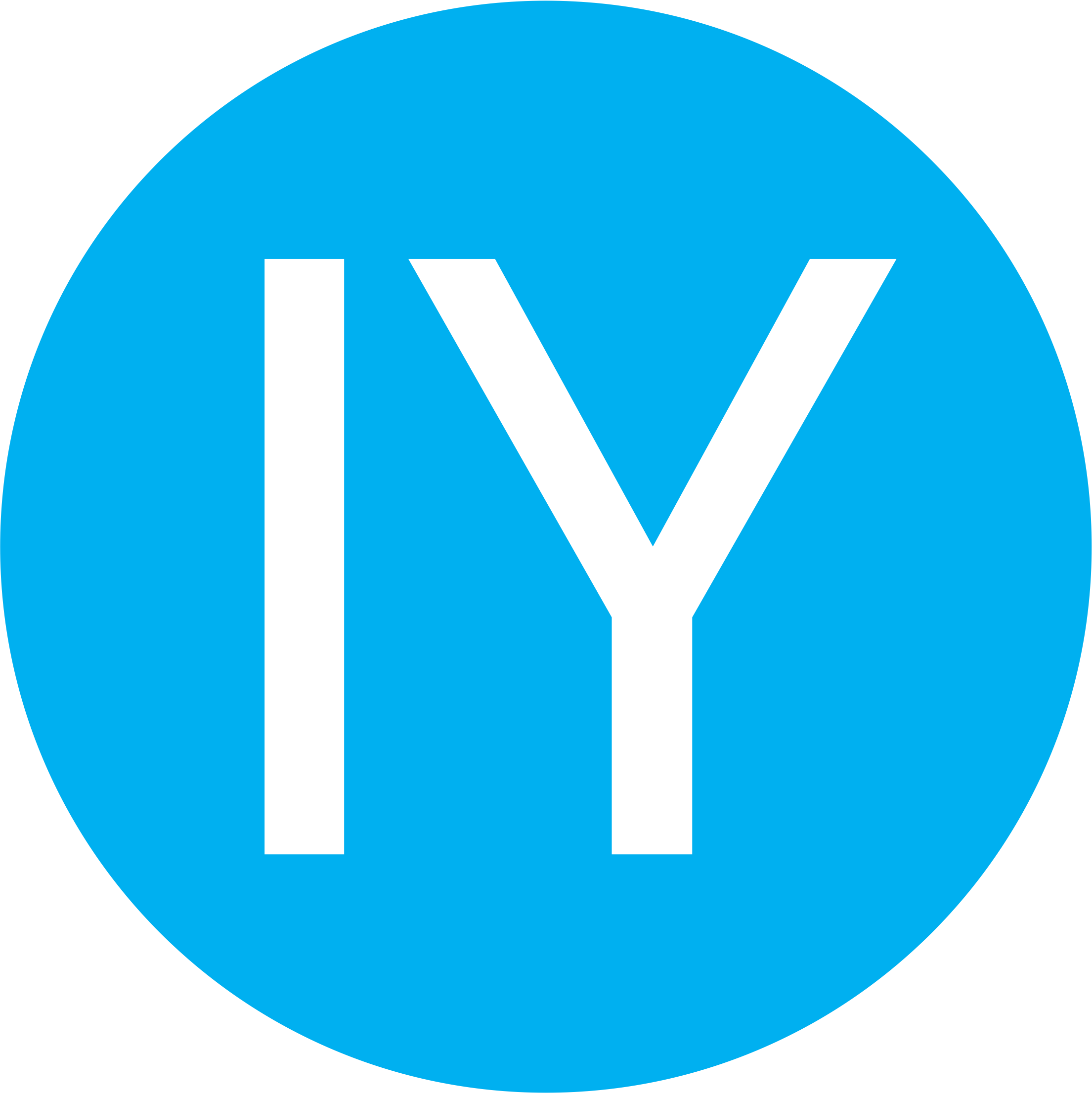

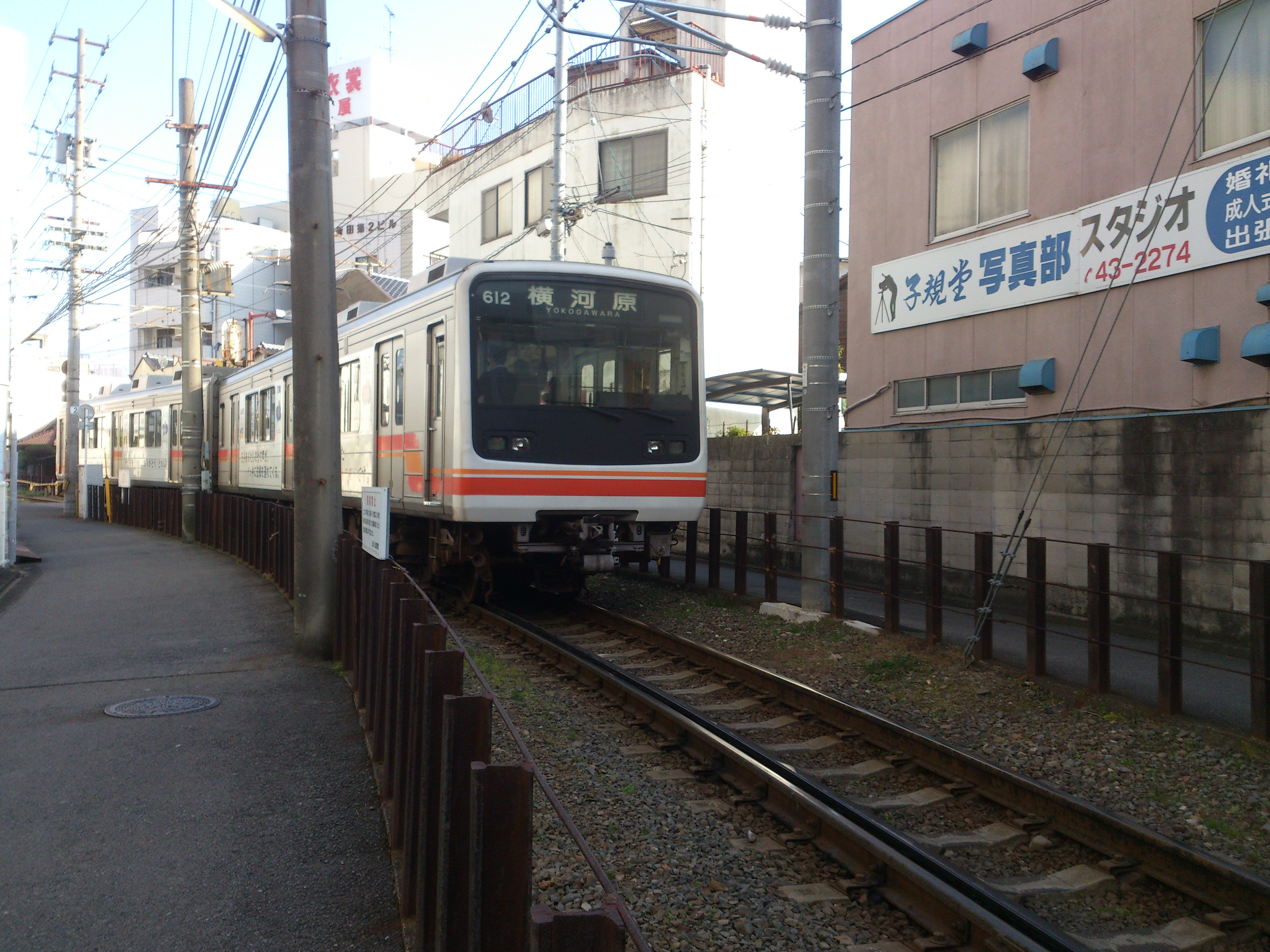
- A 610-series passenger train on the Yokogawara Line

Overview
- Native name: 横河原線
- Owner: Iyotetsu
- Locale: Ehime Prefecture
- Termini: Matsuyama City; Yokogawara
- Stations: 15
- Website: http://www.iyotetsu.co.jp

Service
- Type: Heavy rail

History
- Opened: 7 May 1893; 133 years ago

Technical
- Line length: 13.2 km (8.2 mi)
- Track gauge: 1,067 mm (3 ft 6 in)
- Electrification: Overhead line, DC 750 V
- Operating speed: 65 km/h (40 mph)
Route map

The Yokogawara Line (横河原線, Yokogawara-sen) is a 13.2 km railway line owned by Iyotetsu. The line connects Matsuyama with Tōon in Ehime Prefecture, Japan. The line runs eastwards from Matsuyama City Station, terminating at Yokogawara Station.

== History ==
The line opened to Hirai in 1893, and was later extended to Yokogawara in 1899. Iyotetsu attempted to close the section between Hirai and Yokogawara and convert it into a bus line in 1965, when the Morimatsu line branching off from Iyo-Tachibana was closed due to deficits and lack of passengers. The passing municipalities heavily opposed this attempt, and encouraged Iyotetsu to electrify the line to increase passengers. The Japan National Route 11, which also took a similar route suffered from heavy road congestions near Matsuyama, making travel difficult. Iyotetsu later decided to keep the section in operation and electrify the entire line. The electrification works were completed in 1967. Through services with the Takahama Line commenced in 1981. The usage of the line increased following the electrification and the number of the services increased. Aidai Igakubu Minamiguchi Station opened in 1981.

== Operations ==
The line is electrified with overhead lines and is single-tracked for the entire line.

The majority of rail services continue past Matsuyama City Station on the Takahama Line to Takahama Station. Trains arrive roughly every fifteen minutes.

== Stations ==
All stations are located in Ehime Prefecture.

| Number | Picture | Name | | Distance (km) | Connections | Location |
|---|---|---|---|---|---|---|
| IY10 | | Matsuyama City | 松山市 | 0.0 | Iyotetsu: ■Takahama Line (through service), ■Gunchū Line; Iyotetsu Trams: ■Route 1, ■Route 2, ■Route 4, ■Route 6 | Matsuyama |
| IY11 | | Ishitegawa-kōen | 石手川公園 | 0.8 | | Matsuyama |
| IY12 | | Iyo-Tachibana | いよ立花 | 1.4 | | Matsuyama |
| IY13 | | Fukuonji | 福音寺 | 2.9 | | Matsuyama |
| IY14 | | Kita-Kume | 北久米 | 3.9 | | Matsuyama |
| IY15 | | Kume | 久米 | 4.5 | | Matsuyama |
| IY16 | | Takanoko | 鷹ノ子 | 5.6 | | Matsuyama |
| IY17 | | Hirai | 平井駅 | 6.9 | | Matsuyama |
| IY18 | | Umenomoto | 梅本 | 8.2 | | Matsuyama |
| IY19 | | Ushibuchidanchi-mae | 牛渕団地前 | 9.0 | | Tōon |
| IY20 | | Ushibuchi | 牛渕 | 10.0 | | Tōon |
| IY21 | | Tanokubo | 田窪 | 10.9 | | Tōon |
| IY22 | | Minara | 見奈良 | 11.6 | | Tōon |
| IY23 | | Aidai Igakubu Minamiguchi | 愛大医学部南口 | 12.4 | | Tōon |
| IY24 | | Yokogawara | 横河原 | 13.6 | | Tōon |

=== Ridership ===
| No. | Station | Passengers (2023) |
|---|---|---|
| IY10 | Matsuyama City | 16,305 |
| IY11 | Ishitegawa-kōen | 481 |
| IY12 | Iyo-Tachibana | 1,846 |
| IY13 | Fukuonji | 1,613 |
| IY14 | Kita-Kume | 1,160 |
| IY15 | Kume | 2,156 |
| IY16 | Takanoko | 851 |
| IY17 | Hirai | 833 |
| IY18 | Umenomoto | 1,350 |
| IY19 | Ushibuchidanchi-mae | 774 |
| IY20 | Ushibuchi | 209 |
| IY21 | Tanokubo | 662 |
| IY22 | Minara | 615 |
| IY23 | Aidai Igakubu Minamiguchi | 1,192 |
| IY24 | Yokogawara | 1,086 |
