= Iyotetsu =

Transport provider on Shikoku Island, Japan

Iyo Railway Co., Ltd.

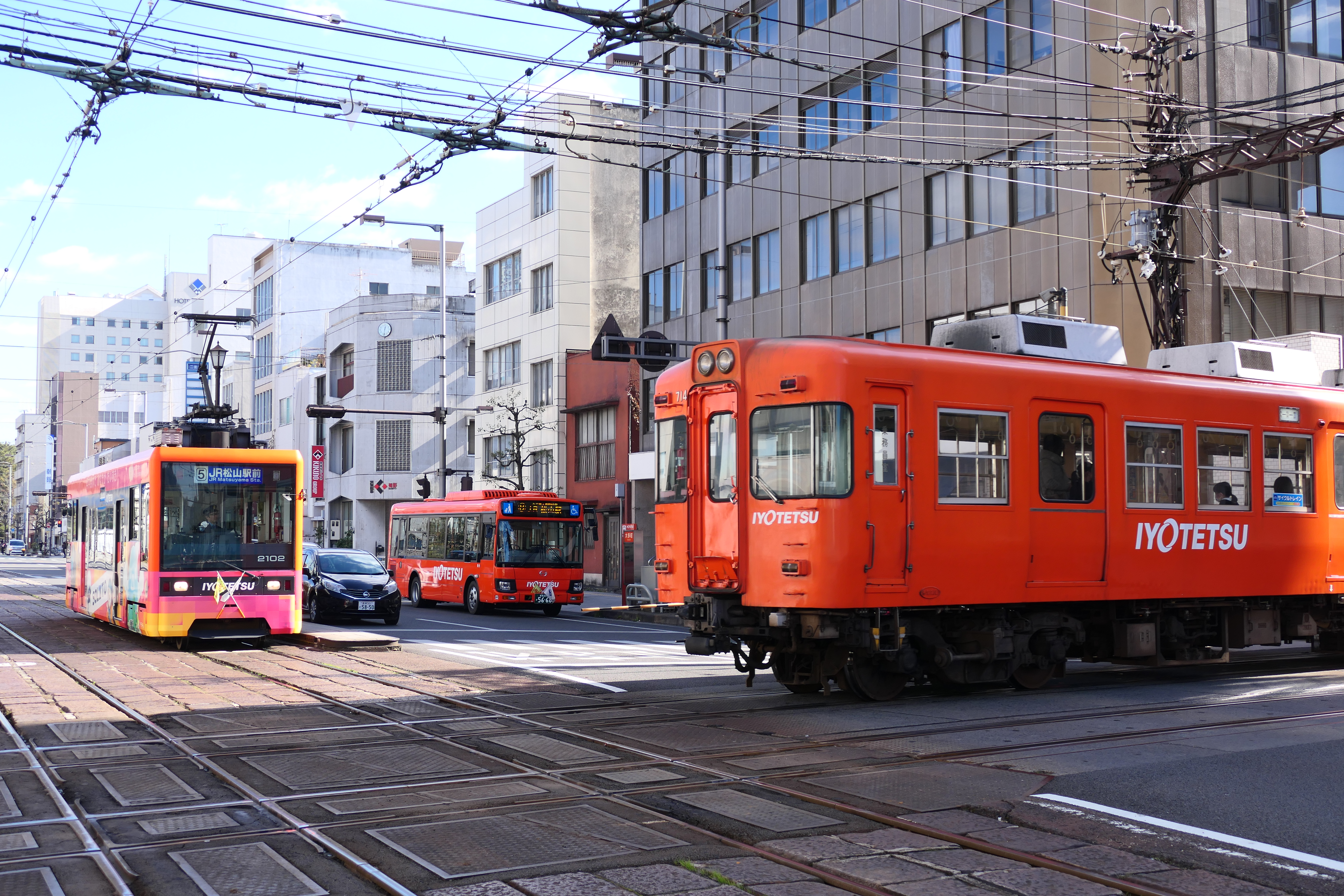
- Iyotetsu heavy rail, bus and tram services meet at Ōtemachi Station in January 2020
- Trade name: Iyotetsu (伊予鉄)
- Native name: 伊予鉄道株式会社
- Company type: Kabushiki gaisha
- Industry: Transport
- Founded: September 14, 1887 in Takahama, Shikoku, Japan
- Headquarters: 4-4-1 Minatomachi, Matsuyama, Ehime Prefecture, Japan
- Area served: Matsuyama and surrounding area
- Website: www.iyotetsu.co.jp

Iyo Railway Co., Ltd. (伊予鉄道株式会社, Iyo Tetsudō kabushiki gaisha), commonly known as Iyotetsu, is the main transport provider in Matsuyama, Ehime Prefecture on the island of Shikoku, Japan. The company operates railway, tram, and bus lines, and also has many subsidiaries, including a bank, department stores, travel agencies, and various other businesses.

== History ==
The company was founded on September 14, 1887. Its Takahama railway line, the first in Shikoku, was opened on October 28, 1888. In addition to being the first railway in Shikoku, it was also the third private railway in Japan. It is named after the former Iyo Province.

The first tramway was electrified in 1911, whilst the entire tram network was changed from 1,435 mm (4 ft 8 1/2 in) gauge to 1,067 mm (3 ft 6 in) gauge in 1923.

== Services ==
=== Railway ===
System route map

Iyotetsu operates three railway lines, all of which connect Matsuyama to the surrounding region. They are known locally in Japanese as kougai densha (郊外電車; lit. 'suburban trains'):

- ■ Takahama Line: Takahama — Matsuyama City
- ■ Yokogawara Line: Matsuyama City — Yokogawara
- ■ Gunchū Line: Matsuyama City — Gunchū Port

==== Takahama Line ====
This 9.4 km line opened as 762 mm (2 ft 6 in) gauge in 1888, and was regauged to 1,067 mm (3 ft 6 in), double-tracked to Baishinji (8.2 km) and electrified at 600 V DC in 1931. This line is still electrified at 600 V DC, not increased to 750 V DC as Yokogawara or Gunchū Lines. The Takahama Line and the Ōtemachi Tramline have one of the few remaining rail/tram level crossings in Japan.

==== Yokogawara Line ====
This 13.2 km line opened as 762 mm (2 ft 6 in) gauge in 1893, and was regauged to 1,067 mm (3 ft 6 in) in 1931. Steam locomotives were replaced by diesel traction in 1954, and the line was electrified at 750 V DC in 1967. Through services to and from the Takahama line commenced in 1981.

==== Gunchū Line ====
The initial 10.7 km line was opened as a 762 mm (2 ft 6 in) gauge line in 1896 by the South Iyo Railway. Iyotetsu acquired it through merger in 1900. It was regauged to 1,067 mm (3 ft 6 in) in 1937. In 1939, a 600 m extension opened to Gunchuko, enabling a transfer to JR Iyo Station (today Iyoshi on the Yosan Line. The line was electrified in 1950 at 600 V DC, increased to 750 V DC in 1976.

CTC signalling was introduced on the rail system in 1993.

==== Former connecting lines ====
A 4.4 km 762 mm gauge line opened from Iyo Tachibana (on the Yokogawara Line) to Morimatsu in 1896, the line being regauged to 1,067 mm in 1931. The line closed in 1965.

=== Tram ===
Iyotetsu operates a system of five interconnected tram lines within Matsuyama, known locally in Japanese as shinai densha (市内電車; lit. 'inter-city trains').

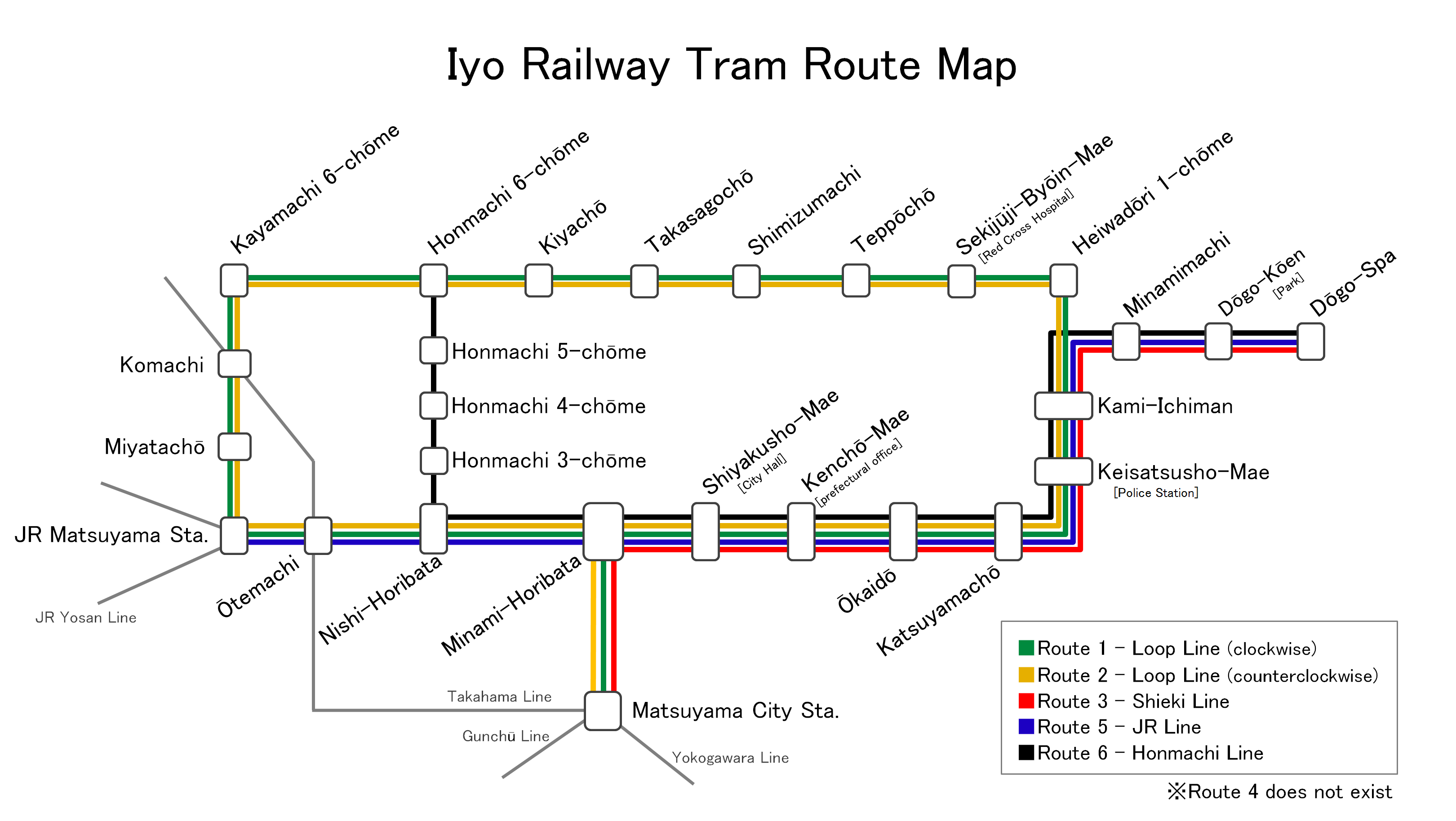

==== Lines ====
There are officially five lines, as follows:

- Jōhoku Line: Komachi — Heiwadōri 1
- Jōnan Line: Dōgo Onsen — Nishi-Horibata
- Honmachi Line: Minami-Horibata — Hommachi 6
- Ōtemachi Line: Komachi — Nishi-Horibata
- Hanazono Line: Matsuyama City Station — Minami-Horibata
- Renraku Line: Heiwadōri 1 — Kami-Ichiman

==== Routes ====
There are five routes regularly in service, which use one or more lines above:

- ■ Route 1 - Loop Line (clockwise): Matsuyama City Station → JR Matsuyama Station → Kiyachō → Kami-Ichiman → Ōkaidō → Matsuyama City Station
- ■ Route 2 - Loop Line (counter-clockwise): Matsuyama City Station → Ōkaidō → Kami-Ichiman → Kiyachō → JR Matsuyama Station → Matsuyama City Station
- ■ Route 3: Dōgo Onsen — Ōkaidō — Matsuyama City Station
- ■ Route 5: Dōgo Onsen — Ōkaidō — JR Matsuyama Station
- ■ Route 6: Dōgo Onsen — Hommachi 6

(Route 4 is skipped, as the number 'four' in Japanese is pronounced the same as the word "death".)

=== Bus ===
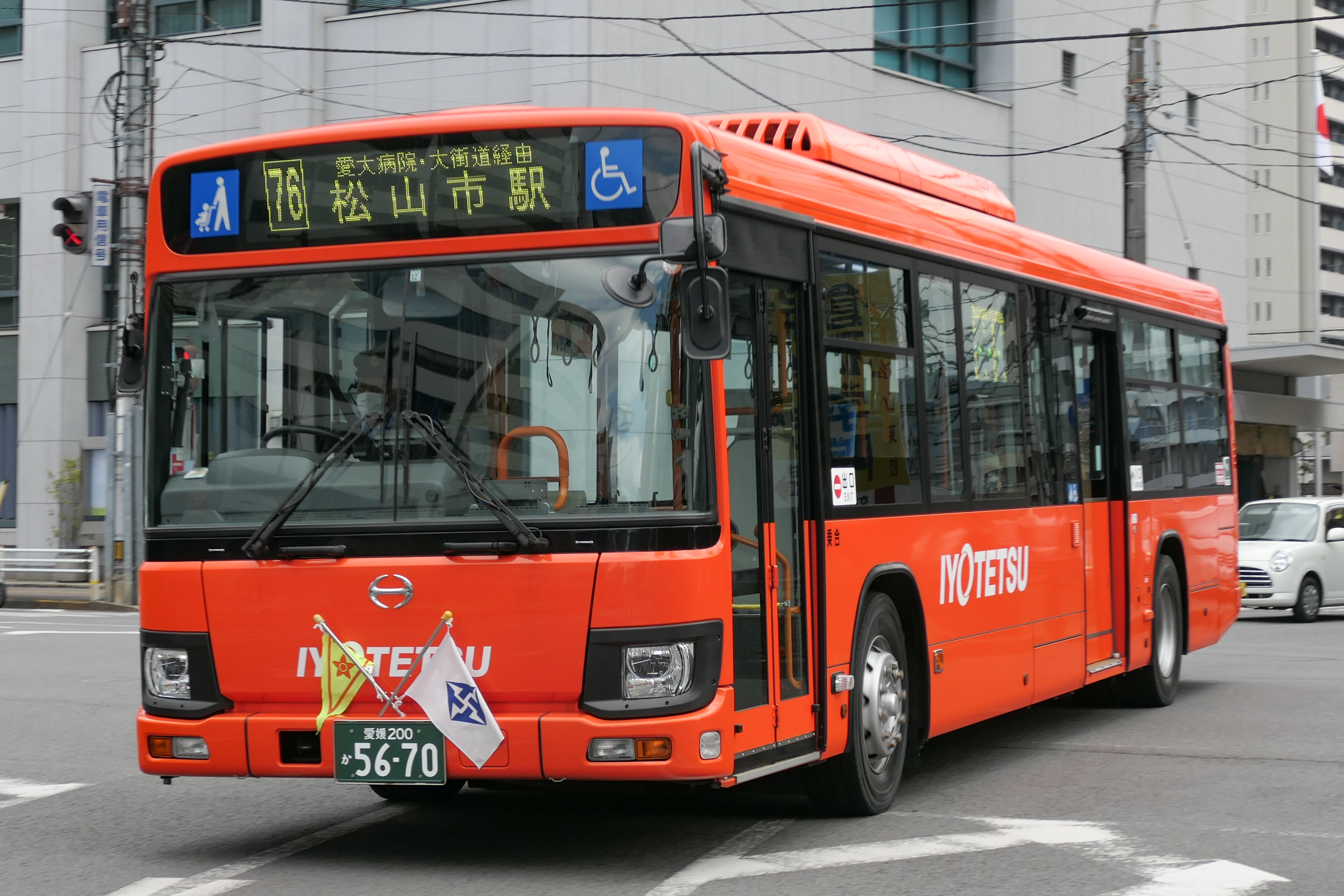
Iyotetsu local bus

The company operates highway buses which links Matsuyama to various major cities in Japan, including Tokyo/Yokohama, Nagoya, Osaka/Kyoto, Kobe, Okayama, Fukuyama, Fukuoka, Tokushima, Takamatsu, and Kōchi. It also operates a local network in and around the city, including services that operate to and from Matsuyama Airport.

== Rolling stock ==
=== Heavy rail ===
- Iyotetsu 700 series two/three-car EMU sets (since 1987, converted from former Keio 5000 series trains)
- Iyotetsu 610 series two-car EMU sets (since 1995)
- Iyotetsu 3000 series three-car EMU sets (since 2009, converted from former Keio 3000 series trains)
- Iyotetsu 7000 series three-car EMU sets (since 2025)
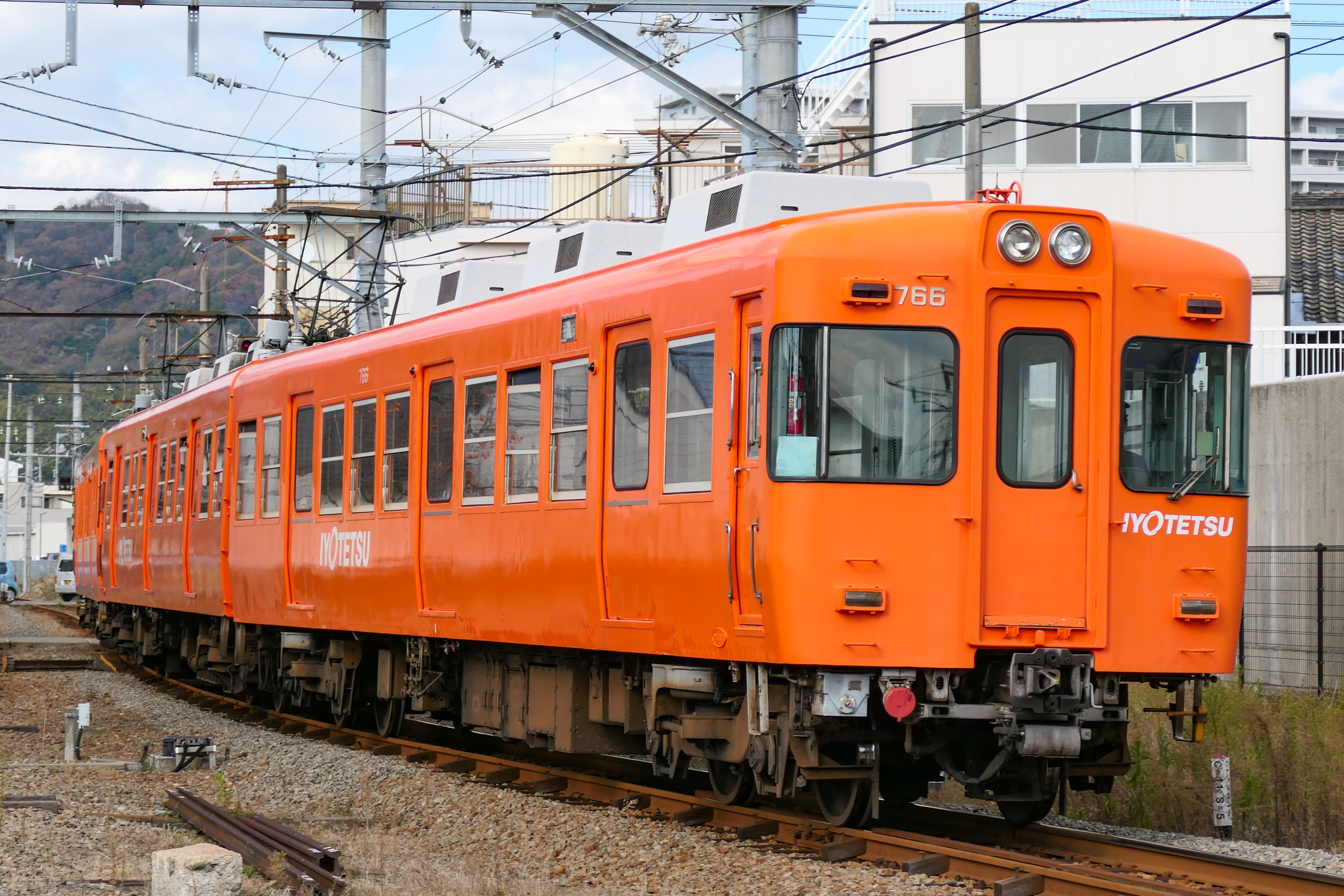
700 series set 728 in December 2021

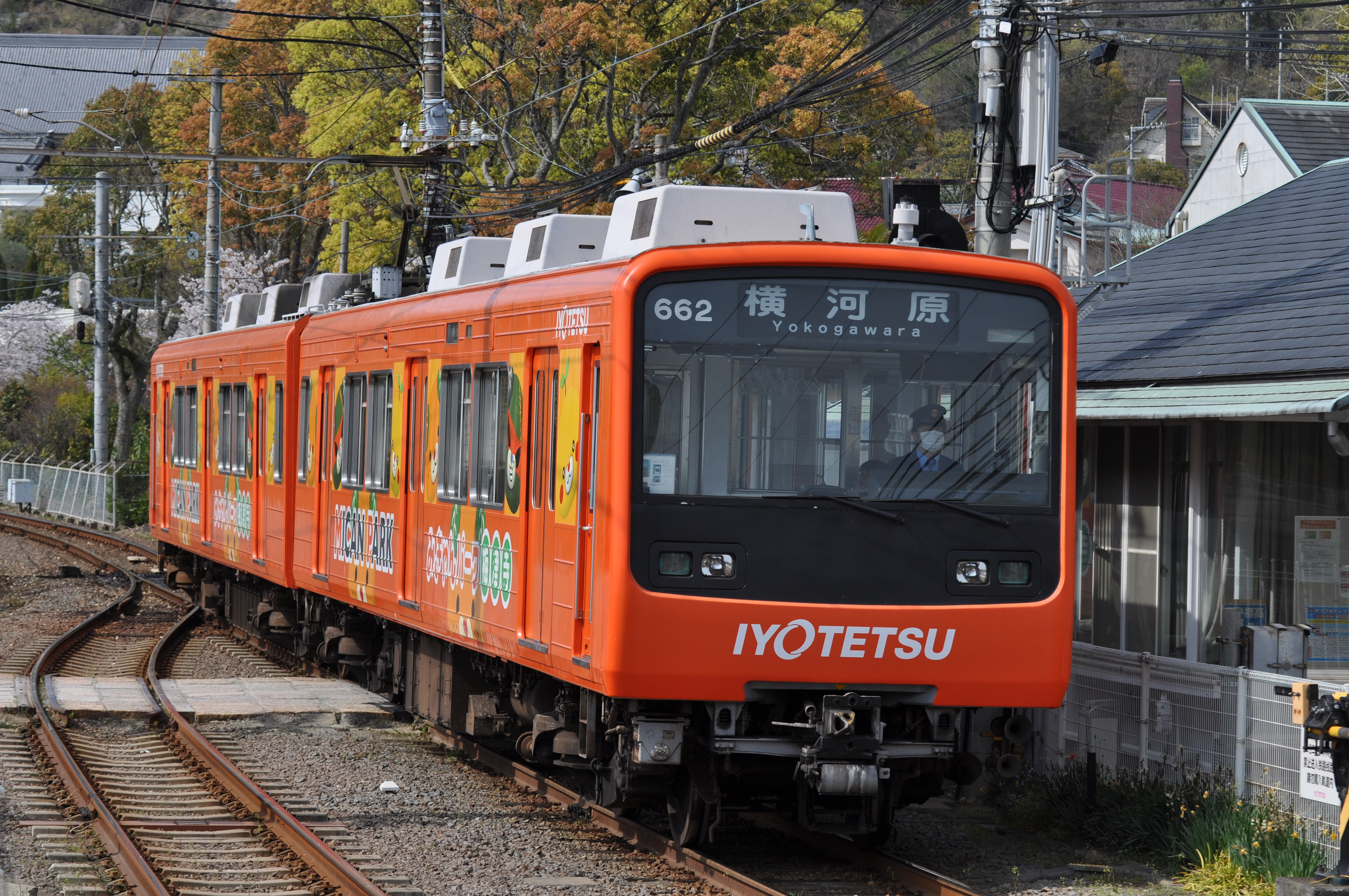
610 series EMU set 612 in April 2023

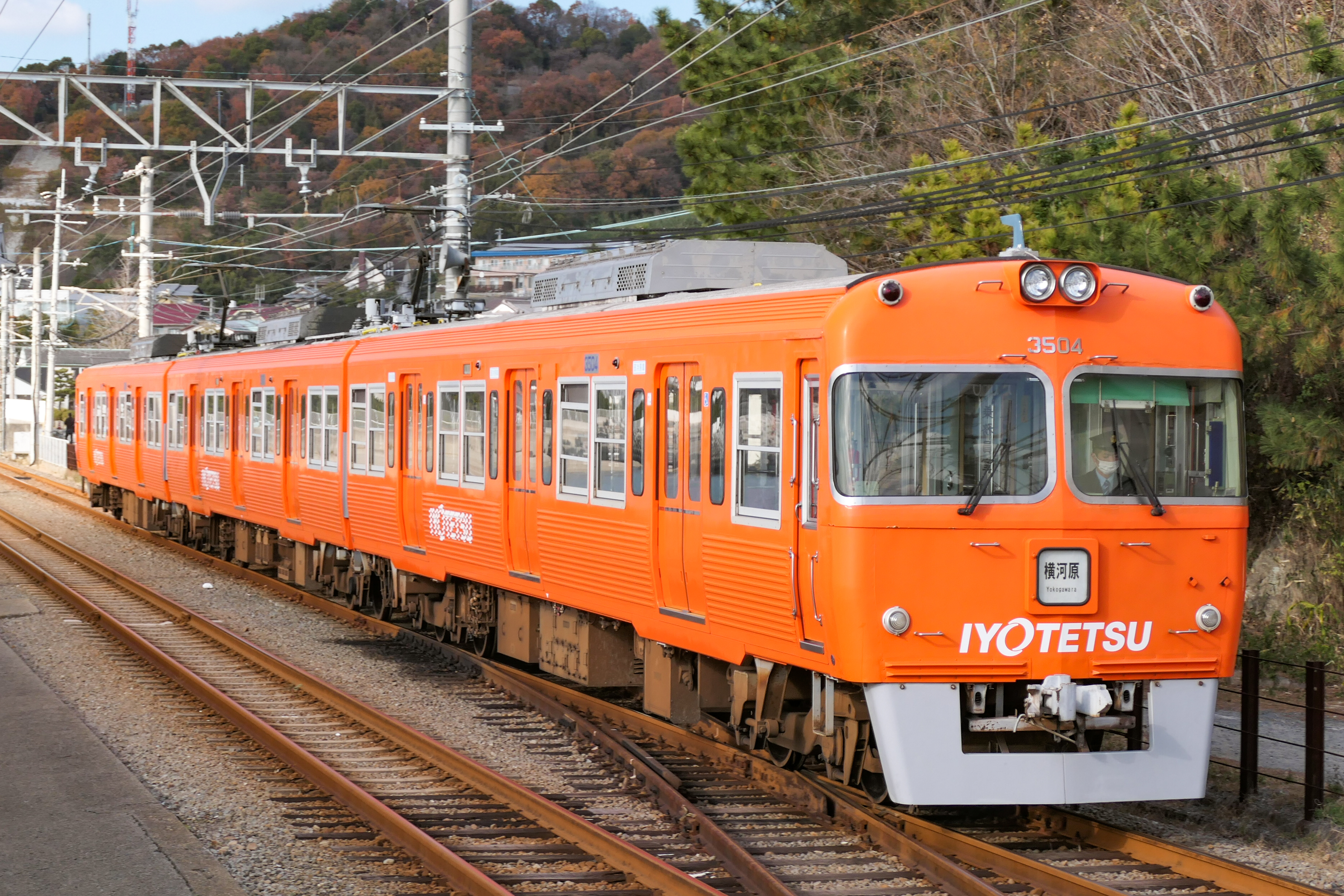
3000 series set 3010 in December 2021

=== Trams ===
- MoHa 50 series (since 1951)
- MoHa 2000 series (since 1964)
- MoHa 2100 series (since 2002)
- MoHa 5000 series (from September 2017)

Two 5000 series low-floor tramcars (numbers 5001 and 5002) were delivered in September 2017, scheduled to enter revenue service on 21 September 2017.

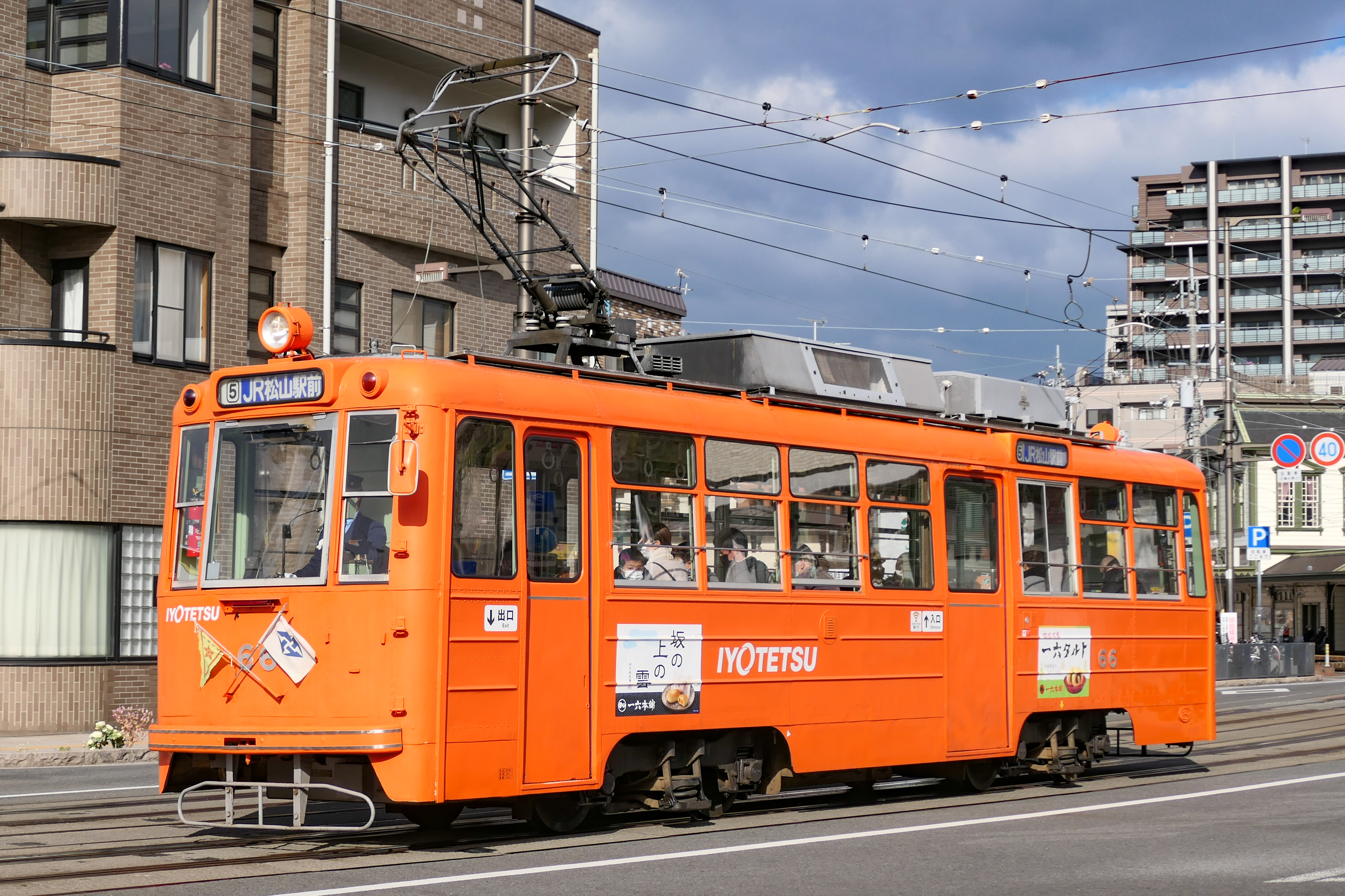
A MoHa 50 series tramcar

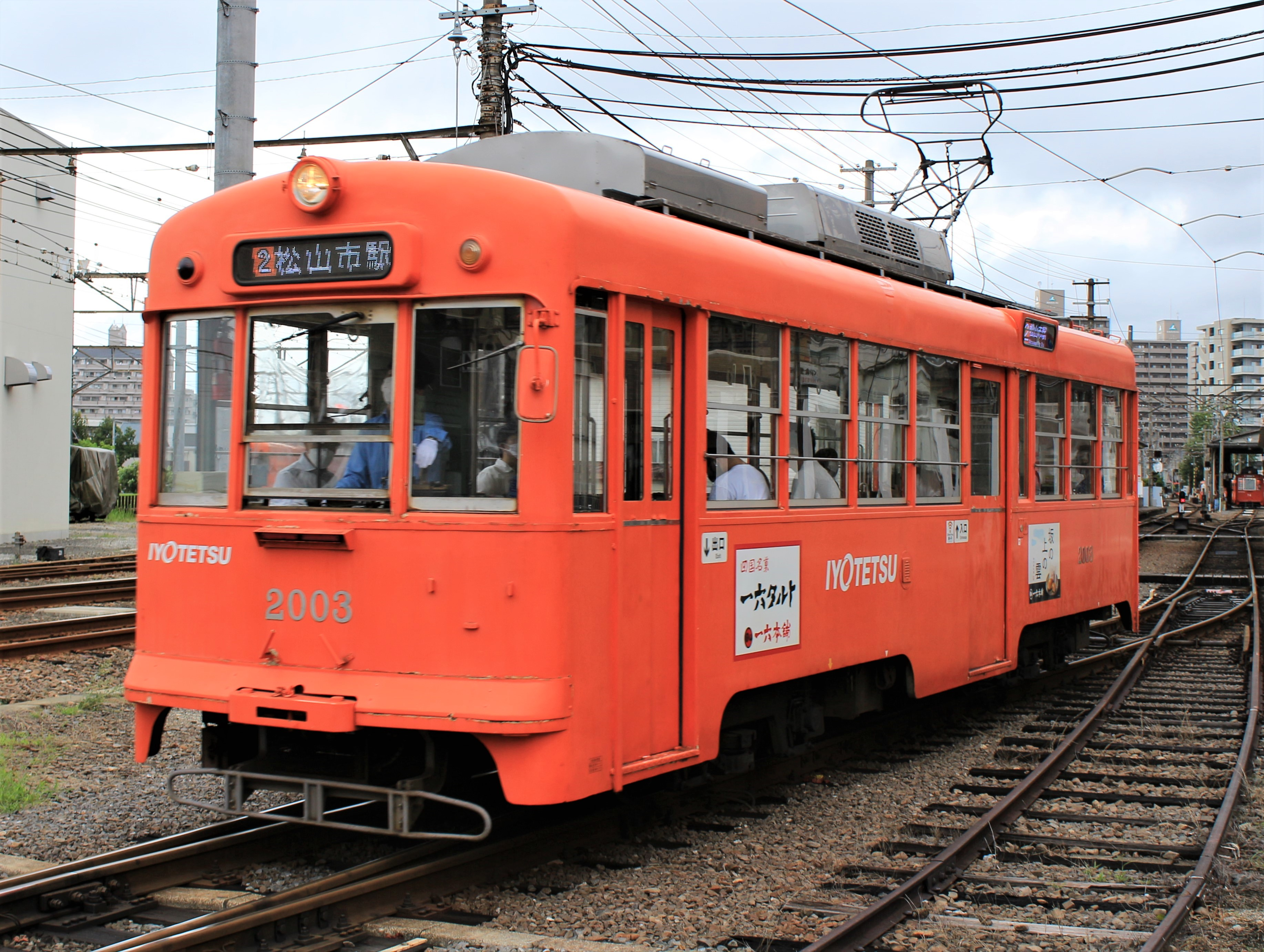
A MoHa 2000 series tramcar

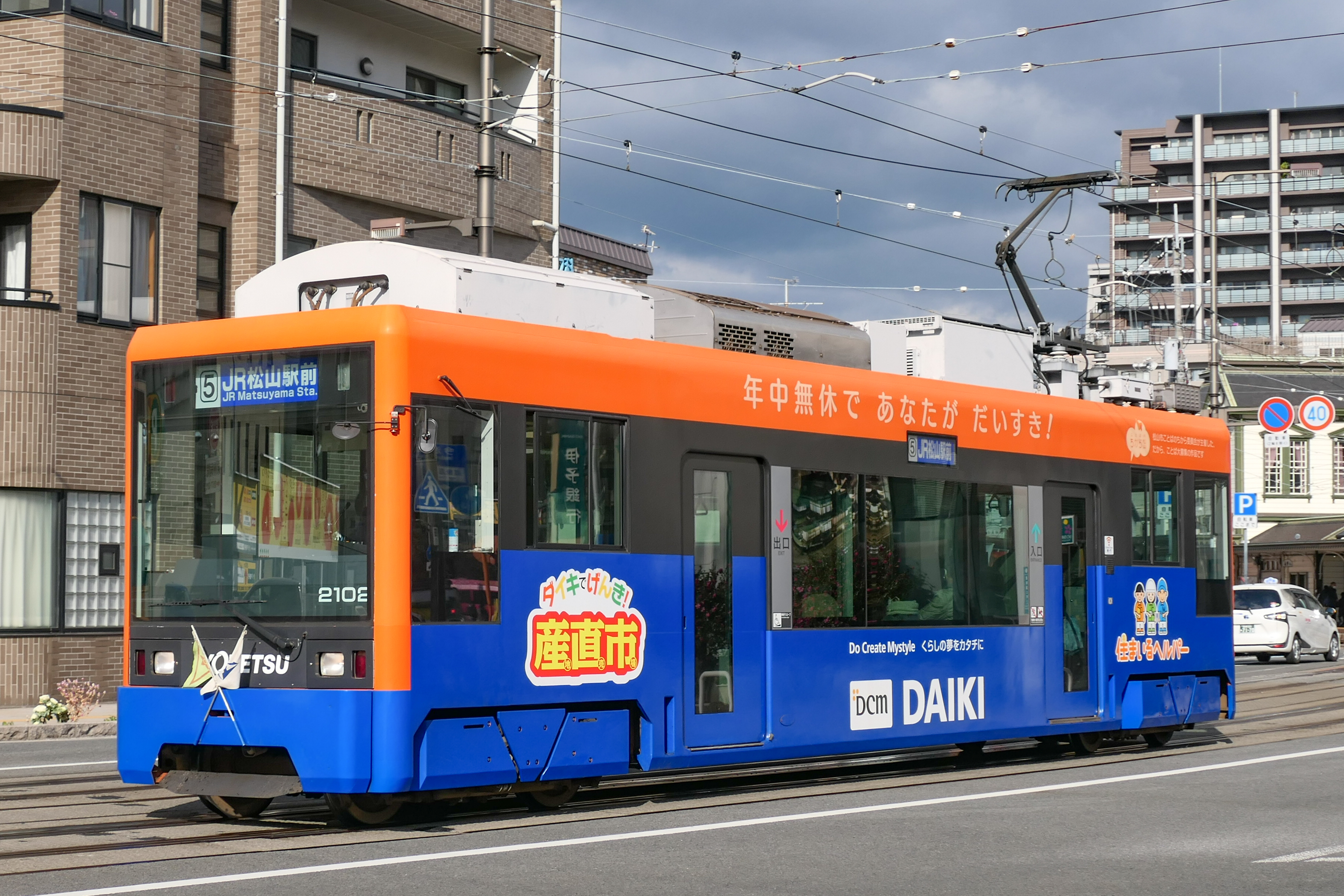
A MoHa 2100 series tramcar

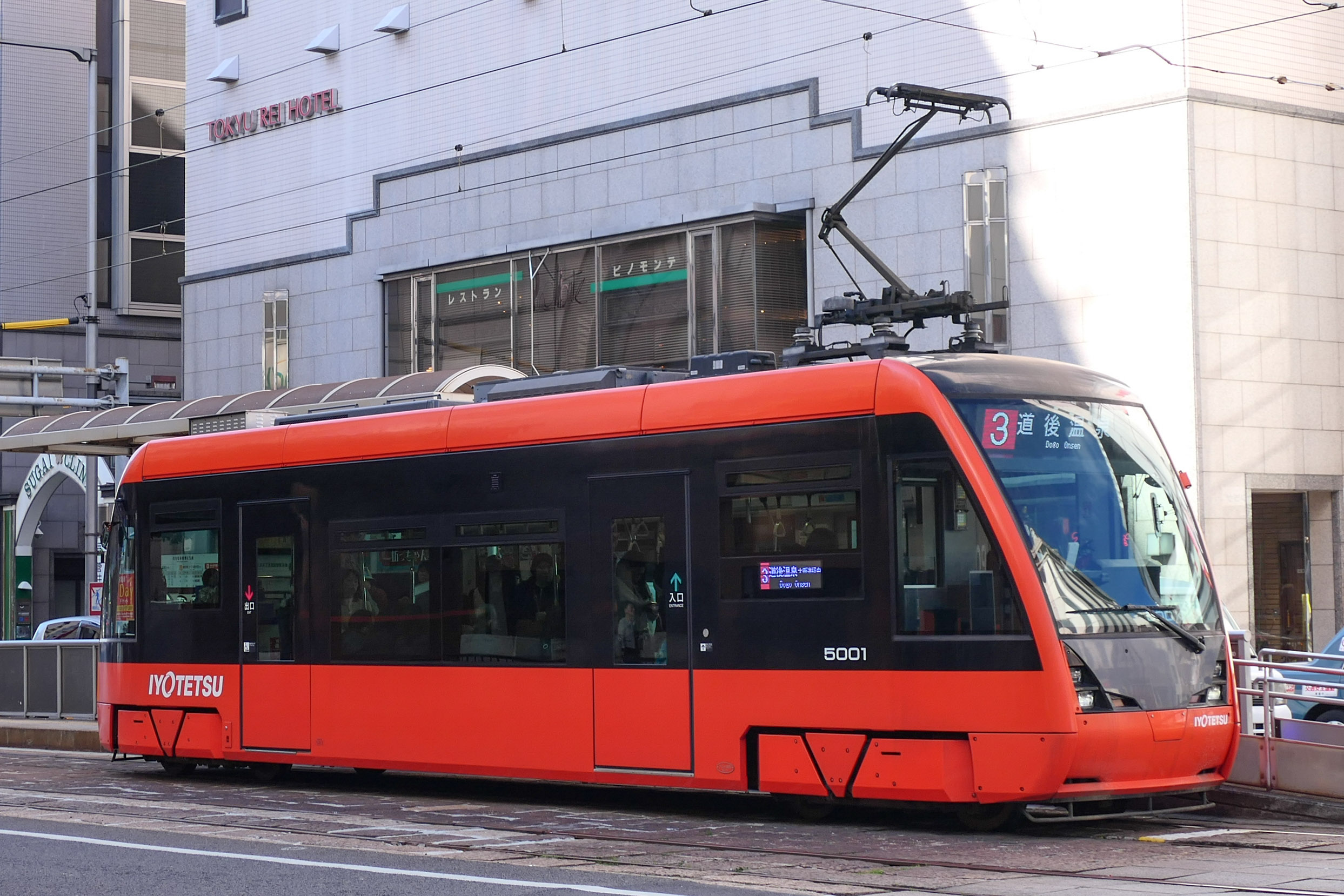
A MoHa 5000 series tramcar

=== Former rolling stock ===
- Iyotetsu 100 series
- Iyotetsu 300 series (until 2008)
- Iyotetsu 600 series (until 2008)
- Iyotetsu 800 series (until 2010, converted from former Keio 2010 series trains)
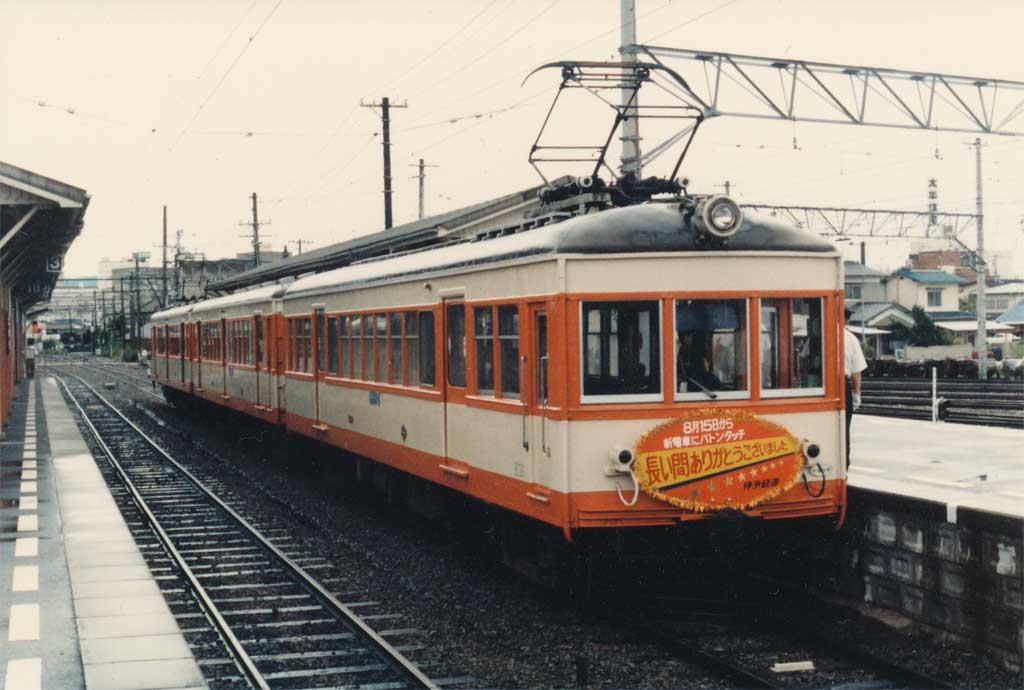
An Iyotetsu 100 series train in 1984

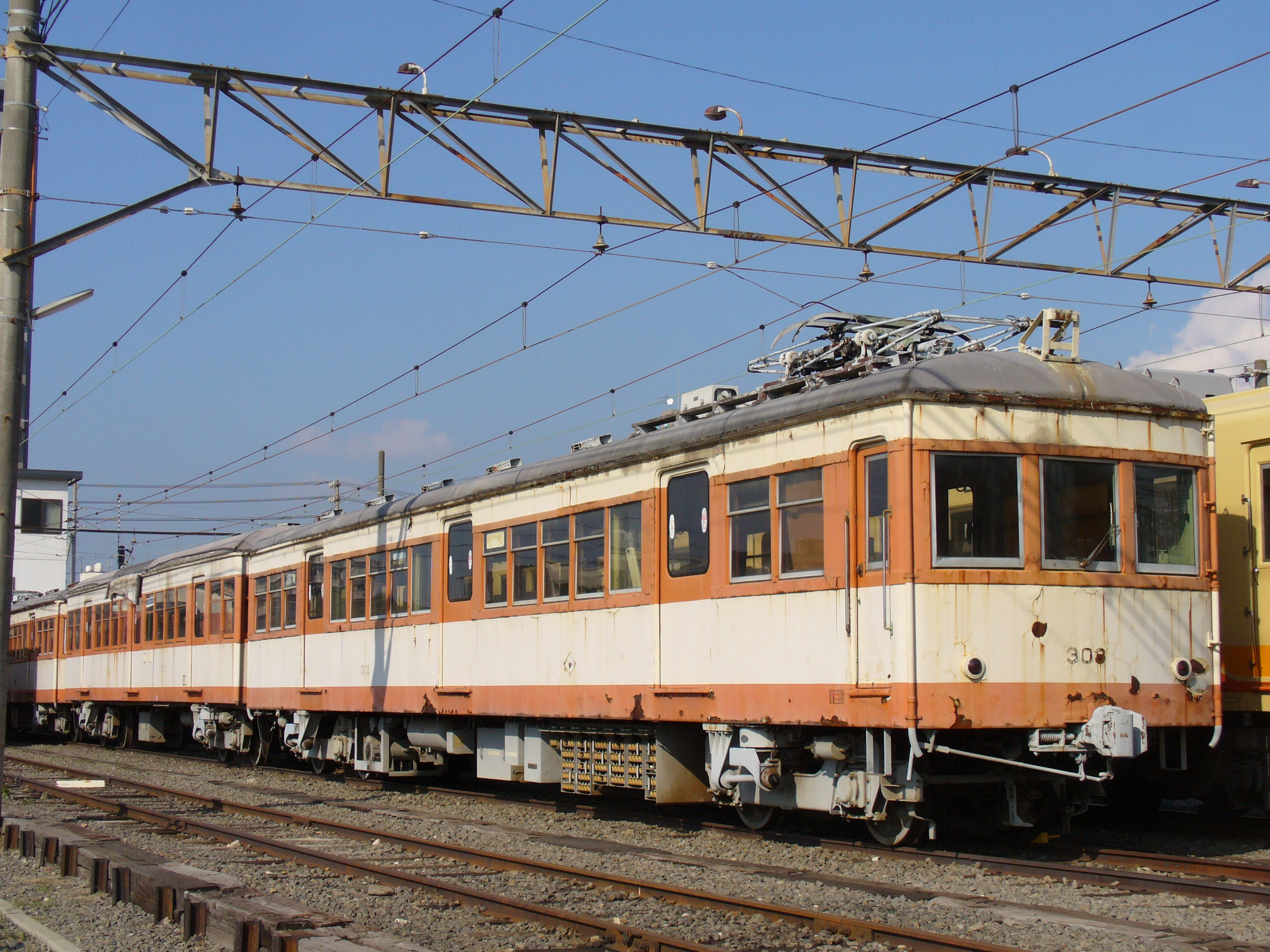
An Iyotetsu 300 series train in October 2008

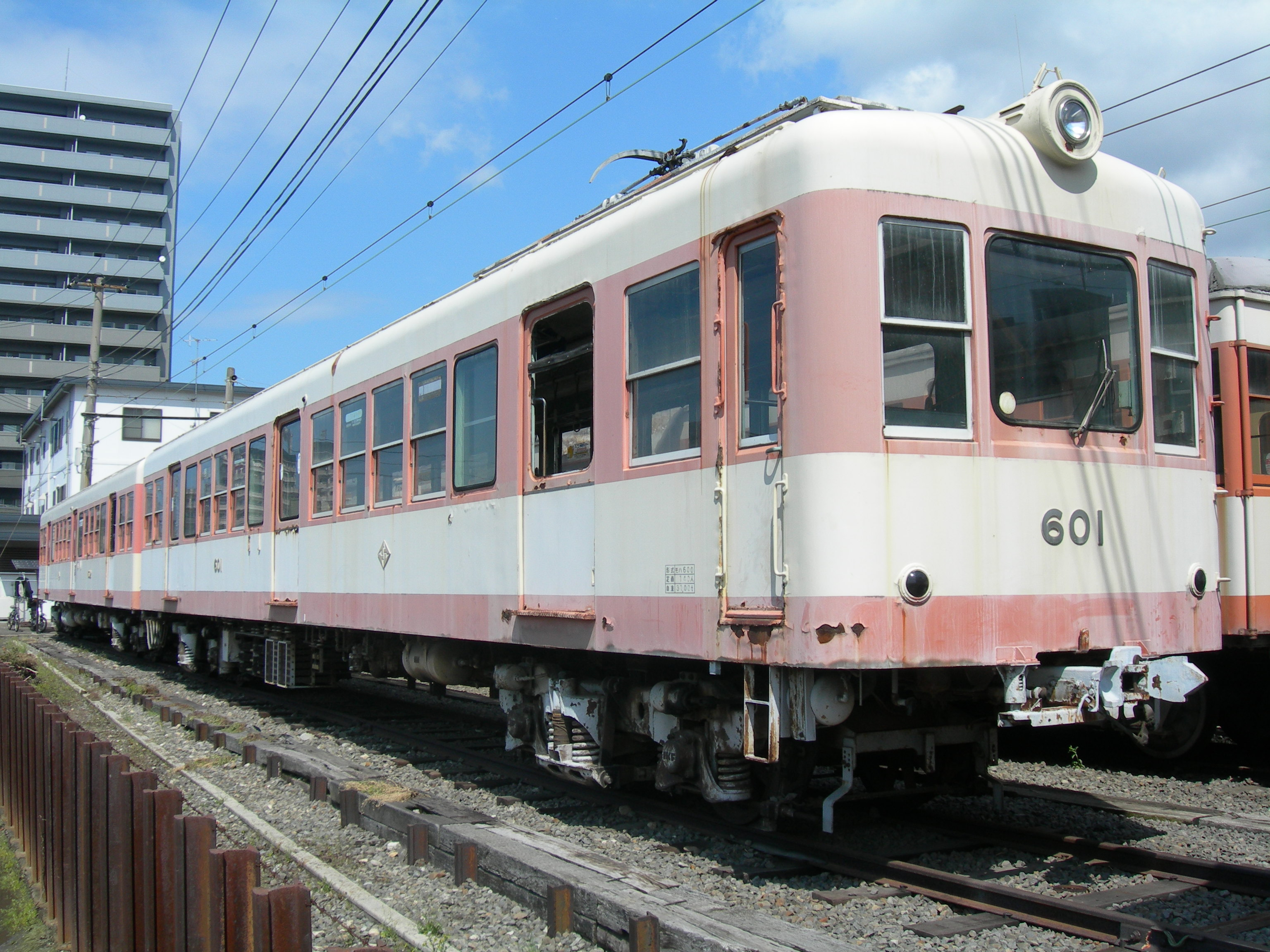
An Iyotetsu 600 series train in March 2008

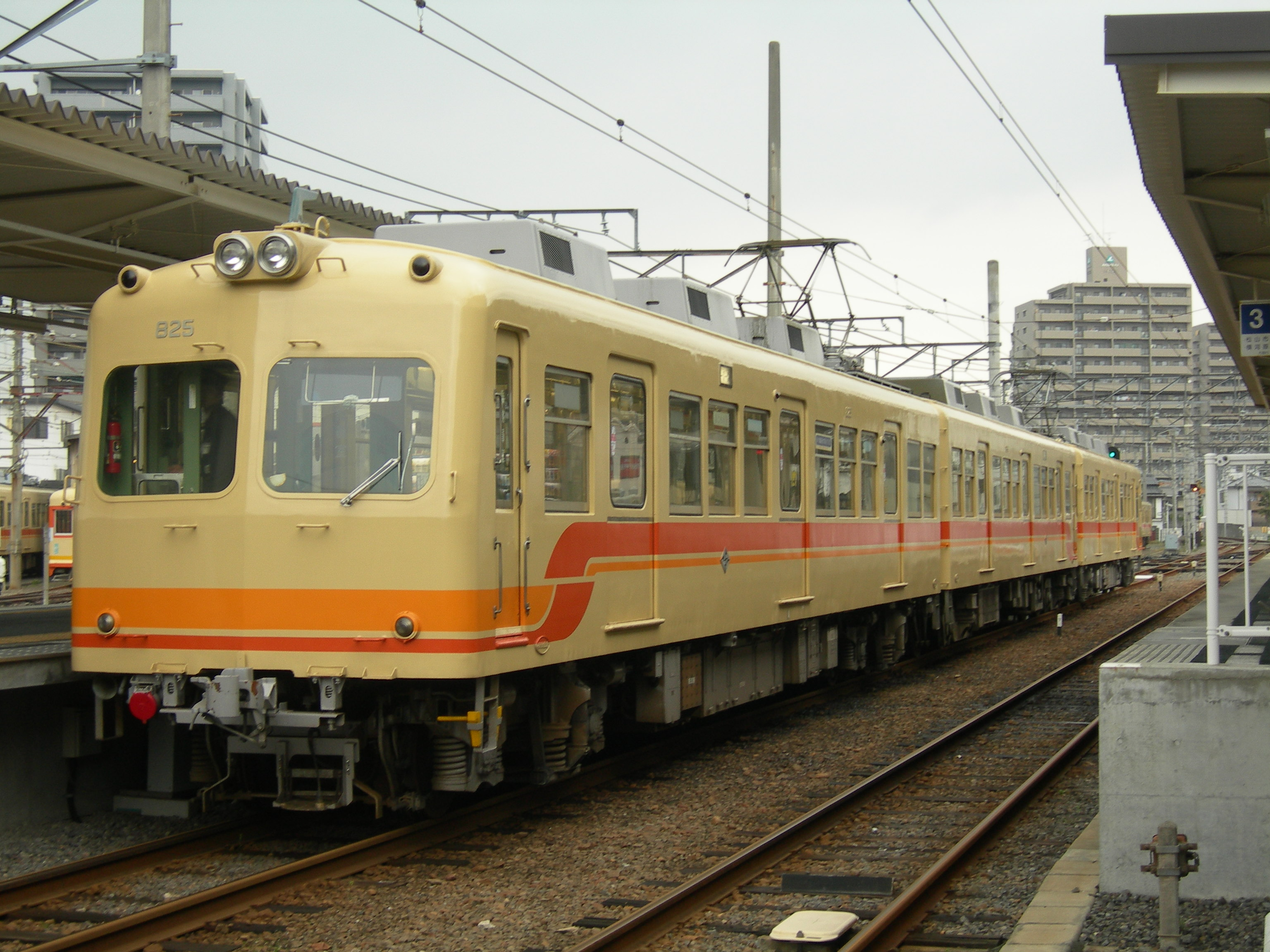
An Iyotetsu 800 series train in March 2008

=== Botchan Ressha ===
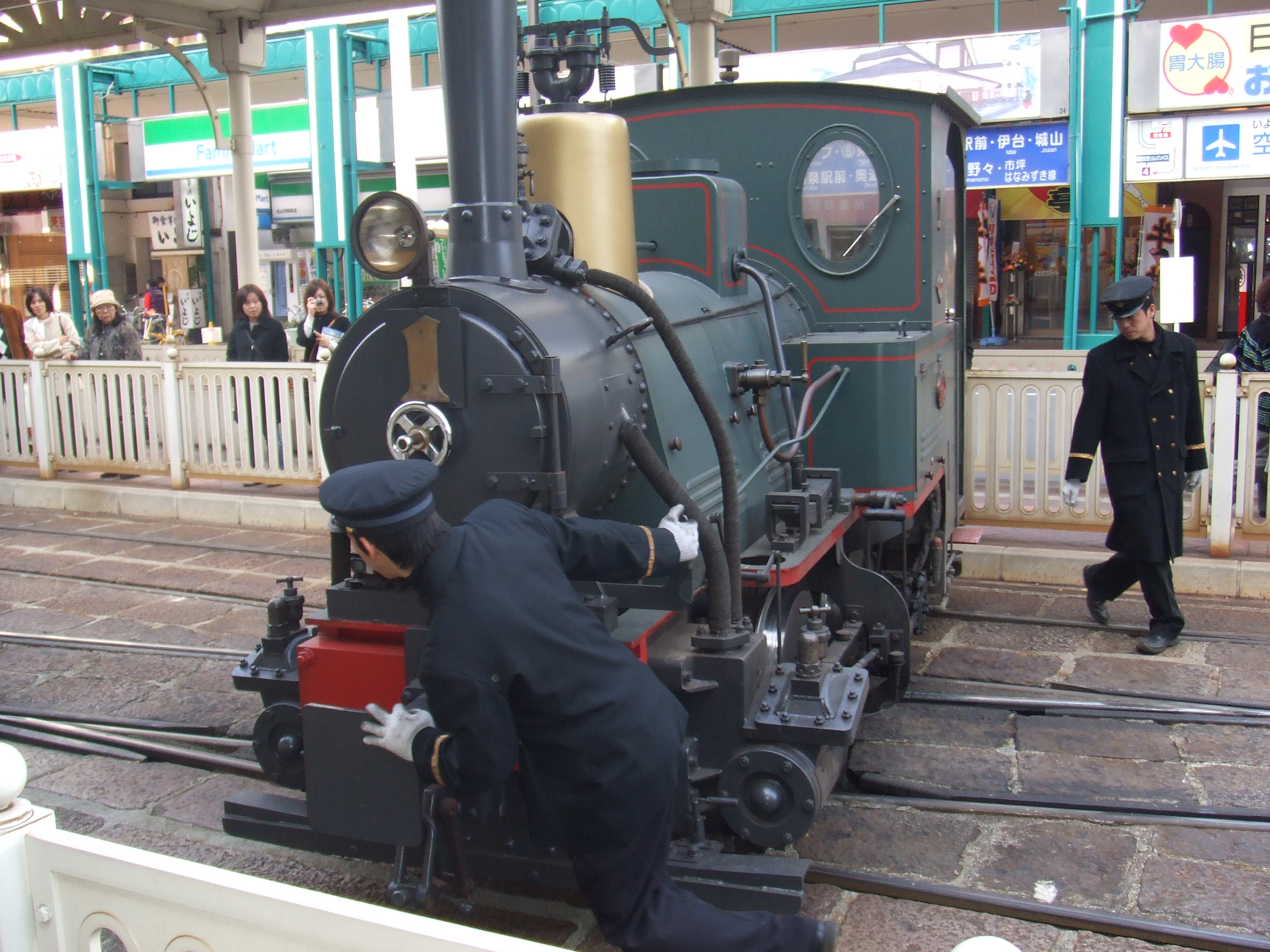
Botchan Ressha turning at Matsuyama City Station

Iyo Railway also operates the Botchan Ressha, diesel-powered replicas of the original Iyotetsu steam locomotives, well-known from Natsume Sōseki's famous 1906 novel Botchan. The current Botchan Ressha, operating on two of the city lines since 2001, reproduces the atmosphere of early Meiji era train travel in Matsuyama.

== See also ==
- Rail transport in Japan
- List of railway companies in Japan
- List of light-rail transit systems
- Track gauge conversion
- List of gauge conversions
