= Botchan Ressha =

Locomotive

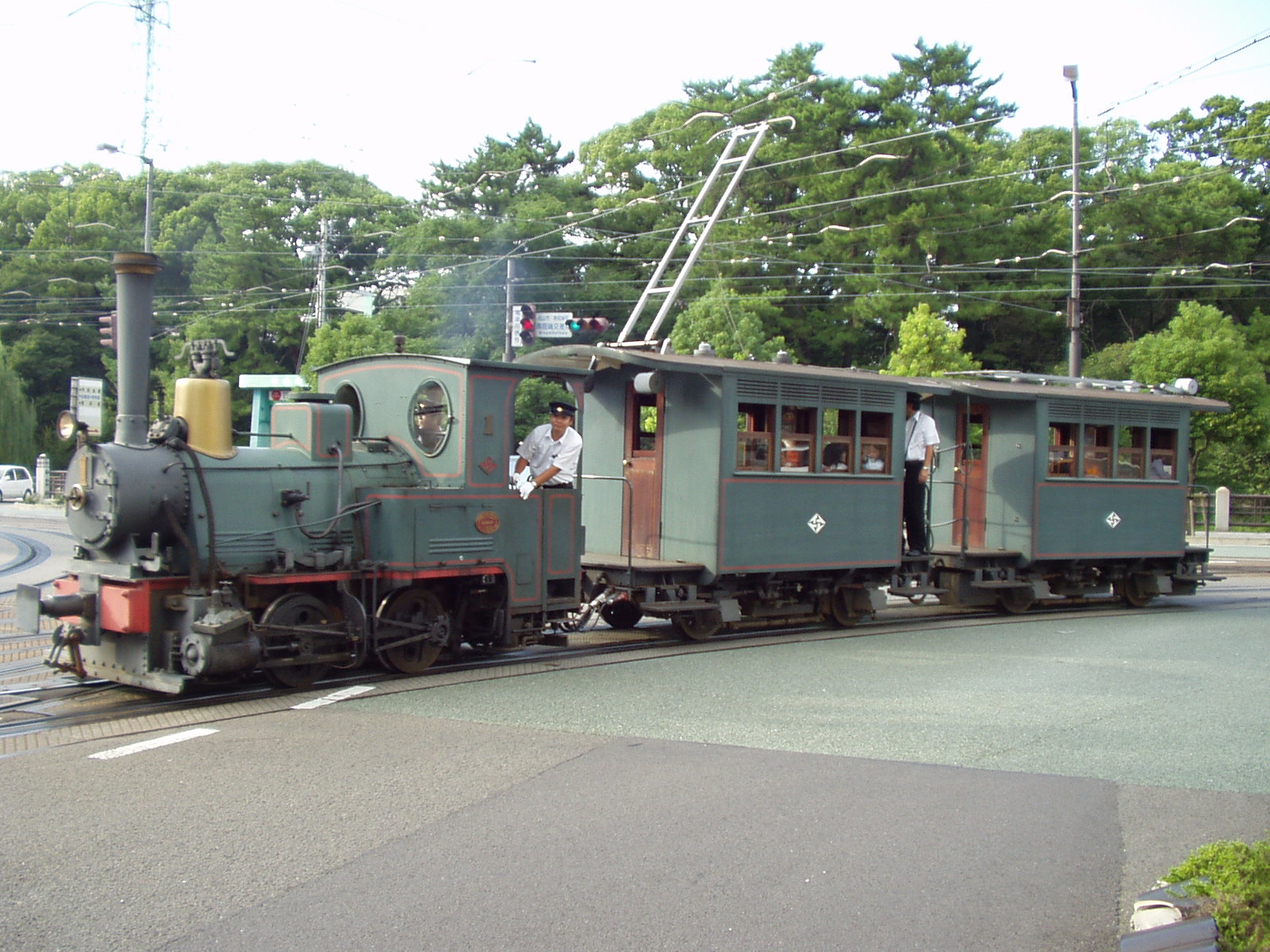
Botchan Ressha

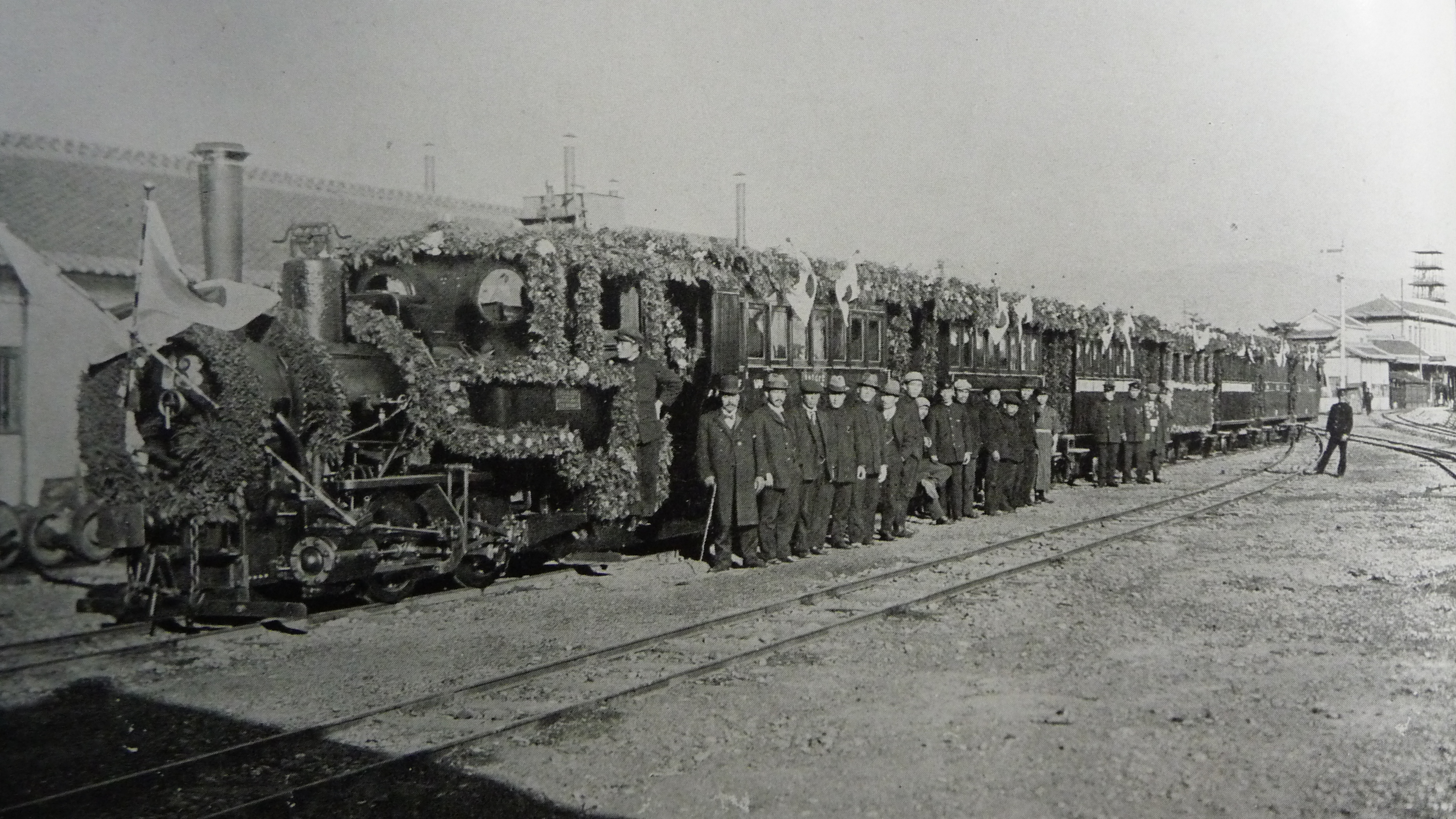
The original Botchan Ressha circa 1910

The Botchan Ressha (坊っちゃん列車), or simply Botchan, is a diesel-powered replica of a narrow-gauge steam locomotive installed in the city of Matsuyama, Ehime, Japan in 1888 as the original Iyo Railway, which was the first railway company in Shikoku and third in the nation. The reconstructed locomotives are now a tourist attraction, alternating with electric trams on two of the Iyo Railway's city lines.

== The original railway ==
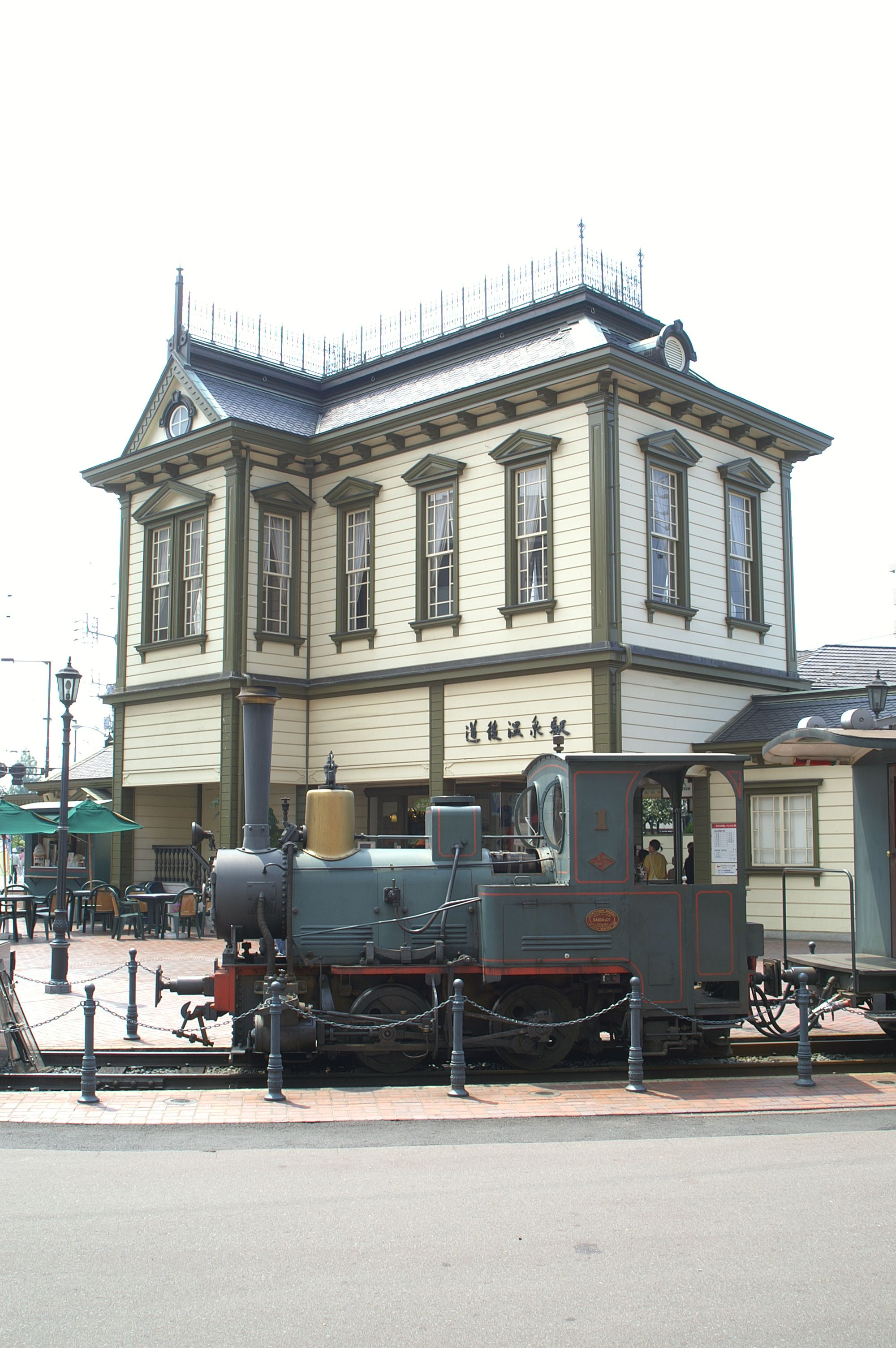
Botchan Ressha at Dogo Onsen Station

The original 0-4-0 (B) type steam locomotives built by Krauss & Company in Munich were imported to Matsuyama in 1888. The narrow-gauge (2 ft 6 in / 762 mm) locomotives used outside Stephenson valve gears and ran on coal. The 4.5 mile line ran every hour from Mitsuhama to Togawa (now Matsuyama City Station) stopping at Komachi station. In the 1894 Murray's Handbook Chamberlain and Mason wrote, "This is a pretty little journey across the mountain-girt plain, in whose centre rises the wooded hill crowned by Matsuyama castle, which comes in view before reaching the intermediate station of Komachi."

The train was small even by narrow-gauge standards, as passengers almost invariably noted. Osman Edwards, who visited Matsuyama in 1898, wrote "Dōgō is only a short distance from the seashore, and is reached in half-an-hour by what I can only describe as a toy train."

== Demise and rebirth ==
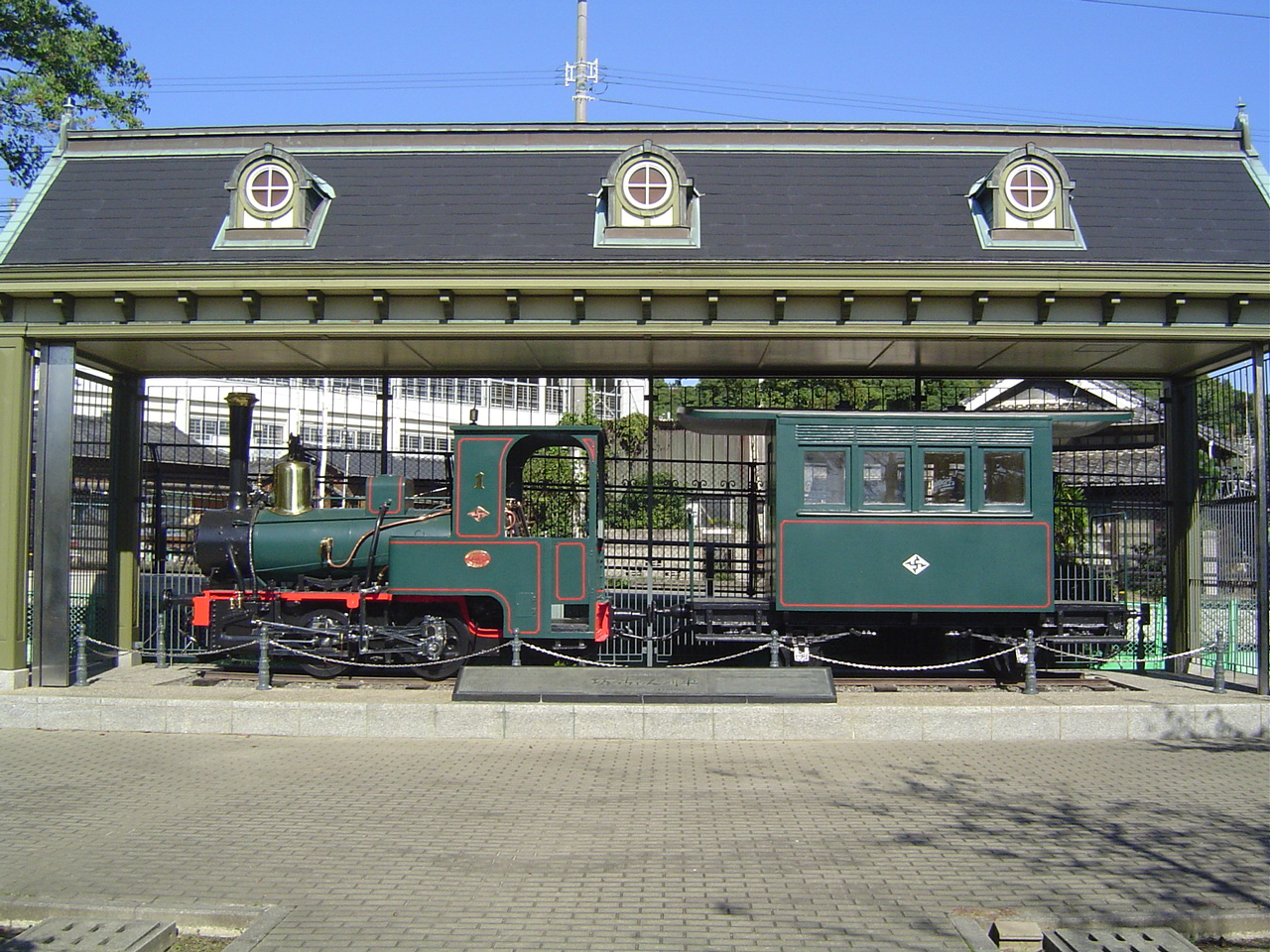
Original train at Baishinji Park in October 2008

The original trains were decommissioned after Iyo Railway (Iyotetsu) introduced electric cars in 1931. During subsequent decades, Iyotetsu made efforts to preserve the legacy of the original trains, due to their historical value and association with Sōseki's famous novel. These efforts included preservation of one of the original locomotives, dubbed Botchan. As a historian noted in 1995, "The Krauss and an original car are kept in a kind of iron cage in the city's Baishinji Park. Its label reads 'No. 2585 München 1888.'"

On October 12, 2001, a diesel-powered replica was introduced by Iyotetsu. Currently, the train makes two round trips between Komachi Station and Dōgo Onsen via JR Matsuyama Station and six round trips between Matsuyama City Station and Dōgo Onsen.

== Cultural references ==
A character in Eliza Scidmore's 1907 novel, As the Hague Ordains comments: "Such a railway! The tiniest miniscule [sic] of a railway — a string of netsukes is the train. I might hang the locomotive on my watch chain — a breloque merely. So droll."

Most famously, the train was depicted in Natsume Sōseki's 1906 novel, Botchan: "I found the train station soon enough and bought myself a ticket. When I got on the train, it looked as dinky as a matchbox. It had hardly started to get rolling when it was already time to get off; the whole ride couldn't have taken more than five minutes. No wonder the ticket was so cheap, I thought — only three sen!"

The train is also featured as playable in Ryojōhen, which is part of Taito's railway simulation game series Densha de Go!
