= Matsuyama City Station =

Railway and tram station in Matsuyama, Ehime Prefecture, Japan

Matsuyama City Station 松山市駅
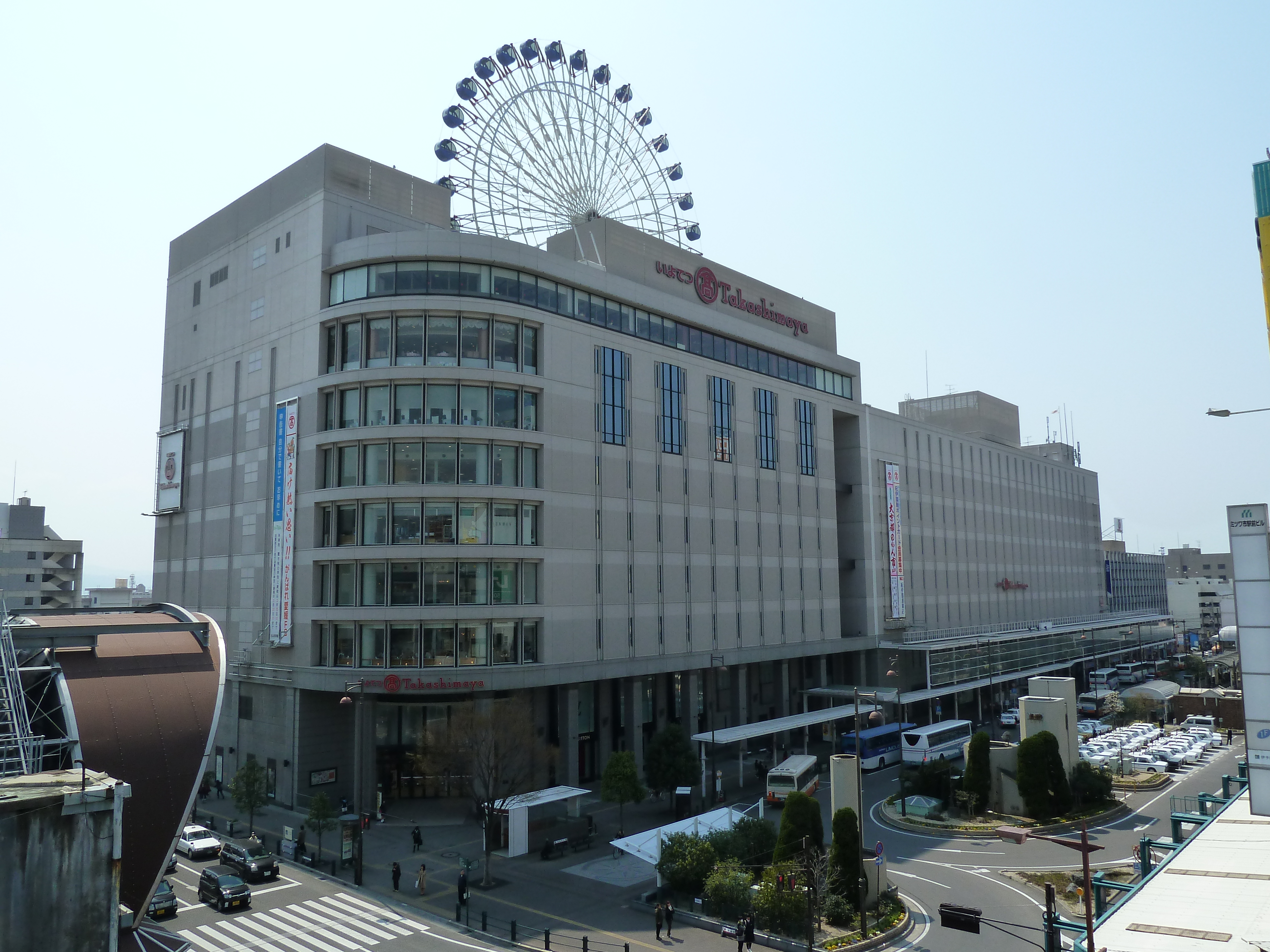
- Matsuyama City Station building

General information
- Location: 5 Chome Minatomachi, Matsuyama City, Ehime Prefecture 790-0012; Japan
- Coordinates: 33°50′08″N 132°45′44″E
- Operator: Iyotetsu
- Lines: Takahama Line; Yokogawara Line; Gunchū Line; Hanazono Line (tram)
- Platforms: 1 island + 2 side platform
- Tracks: 3
- Connections: Iyotetsu streetcar

Construction
- Structure type: At grade

Other information
- Station code: IY10

History
- Opened: 28 October 1888; 137 years ago
- Former names: Matsuyama (1888-1889, 1902-1927) Togawa (1889-1902)

Passengers
- FY2015: 27,175

Services
Preceding station	Iyotetsu	Following station
Ōtemachi towards Takahama	Takahama Line	through to Yokogawara Line
through to Takahama Line	Yokogawara Line	Ishitegawa-kōen towards Yokogawara
Dobashi towards Gunchū Port	Gunchū Line	Terminus
Location
- Location within Ehime Prefecture Location within Japan

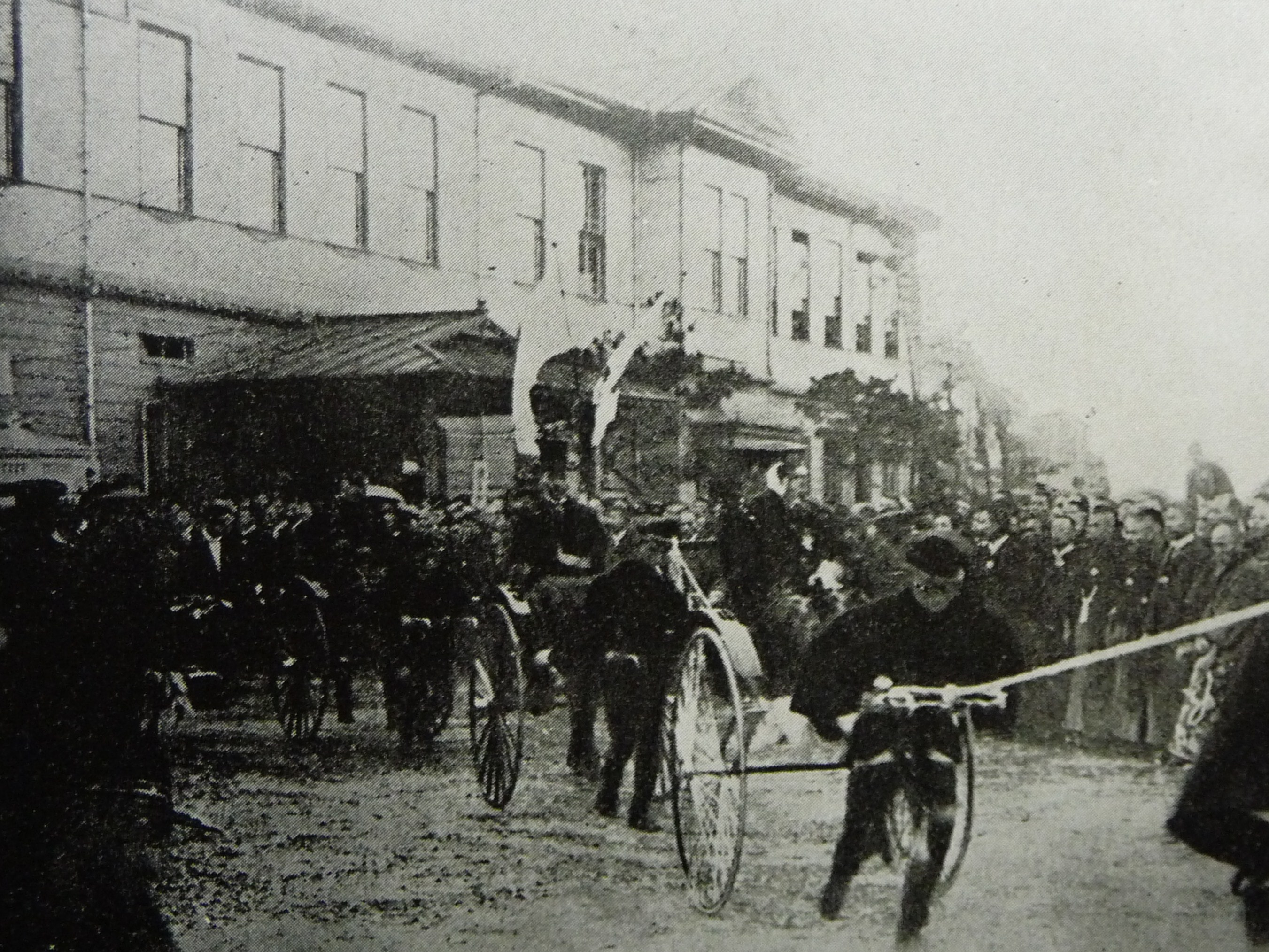
Matsuyama City Station, circa 1930

Matsuyama City Station (松山市駅, Matsuyama-shi-eki), informally known as "Shieki", is a passenger railway station located in the city of Matsuyama, Ehime Prefecture, Japan. It is operated by the private transportation company Iyotetsu. The stations the terminus for the Iyo Railway's rail, tram, and bus lines and forms one of Matsuyama's city centers.

== Lines ==
Matsuyama City Station is a terminus of the Takahama Line and is located 7.6 km from the opposing terminus of the line at Takahama. During most of the day, railway trains arrive every fifteen minutes. Trains continue from Matsuyama City Station on the Yokogawara Line to Yokogawara Station. The station is also served by the Yokogawara Line, and the Gunchū Lines. A tram station in front of the station building is the terminus for five of the six streetcar lines with the exception of Line 6, and the Botchan Ressha, a replica of the original Iyo Railway locomotives.

== Layout ==
The station building houses one elevated island platform and one side platform connected by an underground concourse. The station is attended. The station building is also home to the Matsuyama branch of the Takashimaya department store chain. There is also an arcade beneath the station, known as Matsuchika Town.

== Platforms ==
1	Yokogawara Line	for Kume, Hirai, Yokogawara
2	Takahama Line	for Kinuyama, Mitsu, Takahama
3	Gunchū Line	for Yōgo, Masaki, Gunchū Port

== History ==
The station was opened on 28 October 1888 as Matsuyama Station (松山駅). It was Matsuyama's first central train station, preceding the JR Matsuyama Station by four decades, and was on the first railway in Shikoku and the third private railway in Japan. The first Iyotetsu line ran between the City Station and the port of Mitsugahama (now called Mitsuhama), with an interim stop at Komachi. It was renamed Togawa Station (外側駅) on 20 July 1889, and back to "Matsuyama Station" on 1 June 1902. The station renamed to its present name on 1 March 1927 when its name was usurped by the Japanese Government Railways' Matsuyama Station.

== Surrounding area ==
- Iyotetsu Takashimaya Main Building: Shikoku's Largest Department Store
- Matsuyama City Ekimae Underground Shopping Center (Matsuchika Town): Shikoku's only underground shopping center
- Iyotetsu Head Office

== See also ==
- List of railway stations in Japan
