= Gunchū Line =

Railway line in Ehime Prefecture, Japan

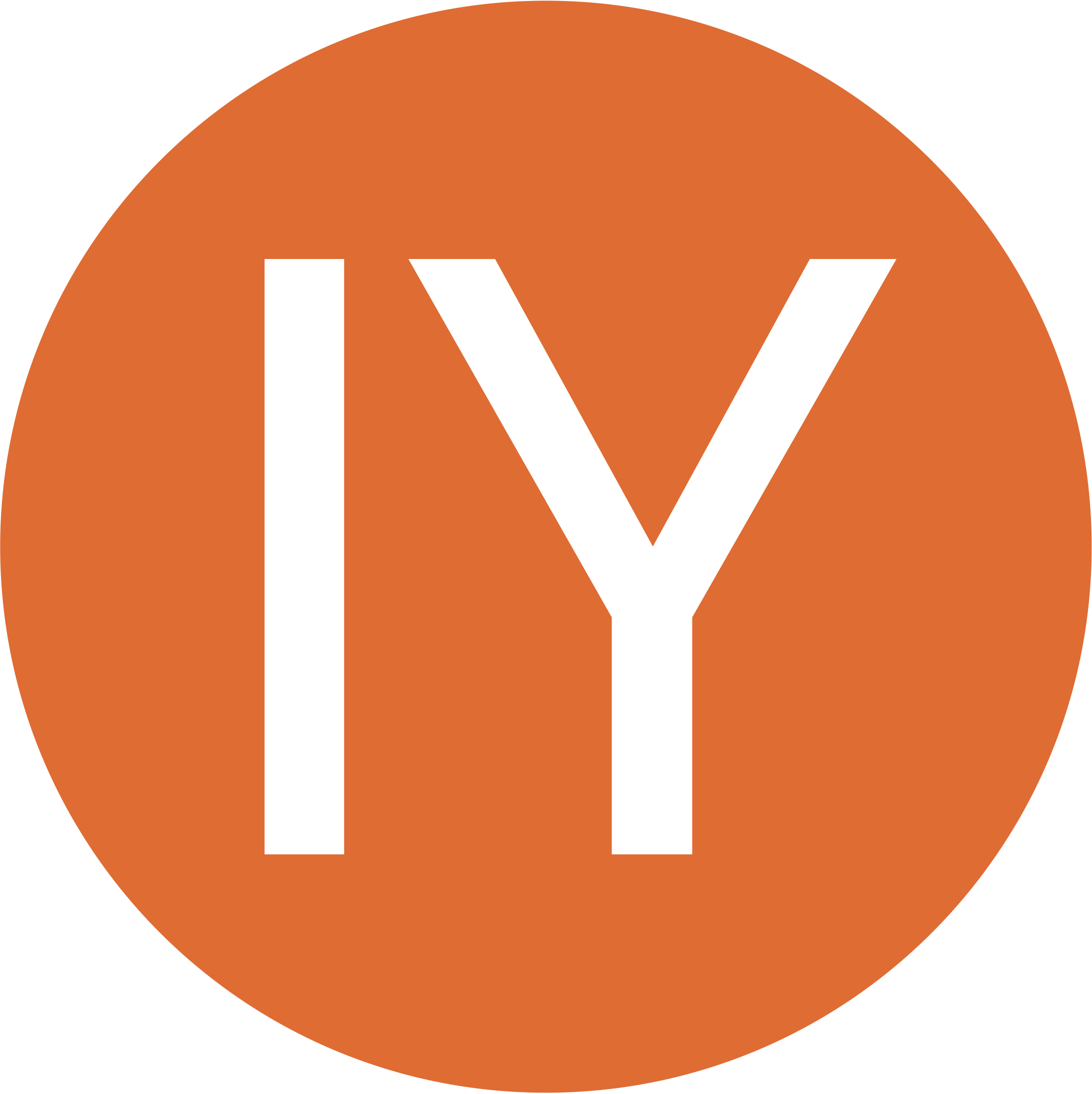

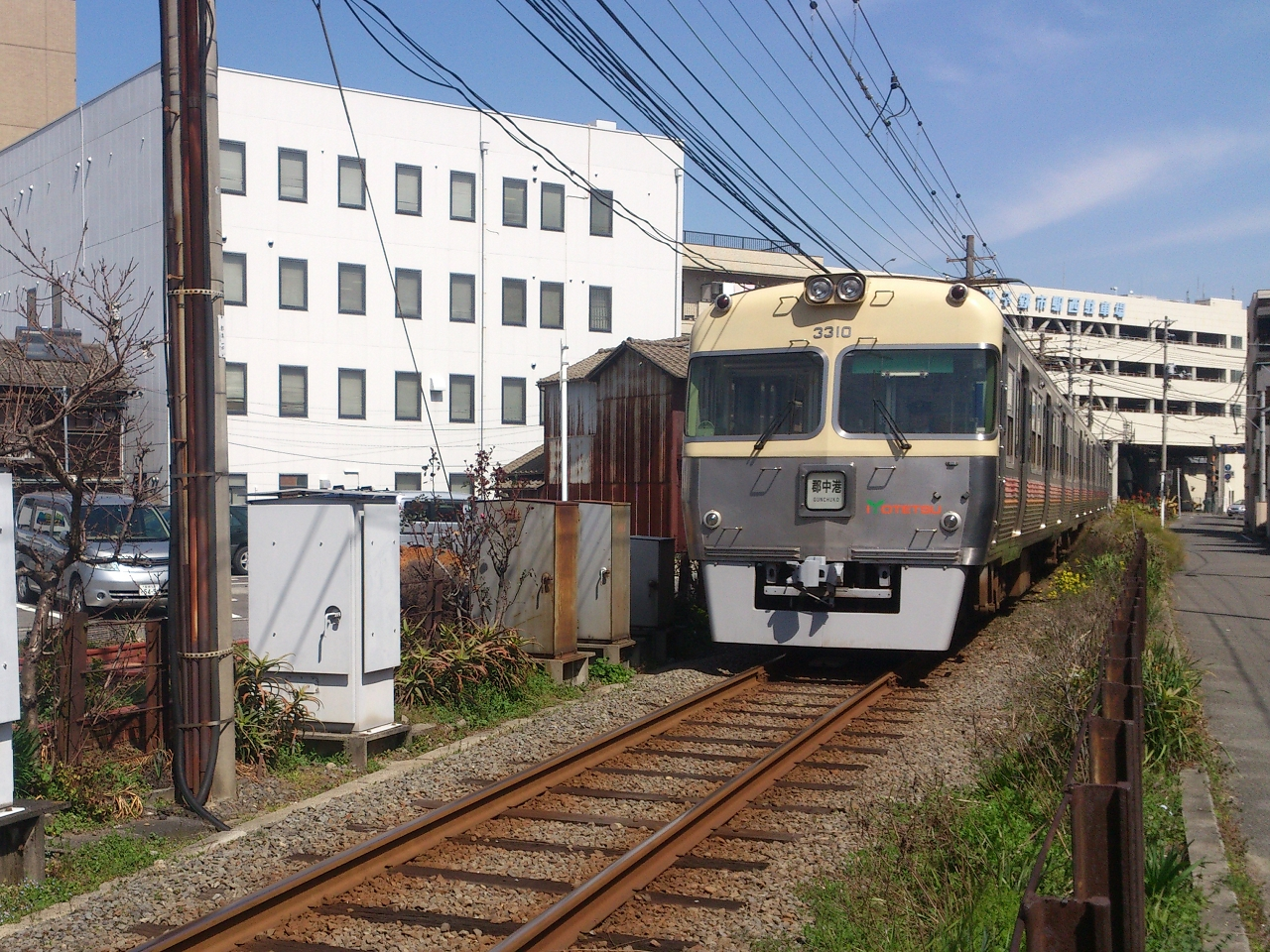
- A 3000-series passenger train on the Gunchū Line

Overview
- Native name: 郡中線
- Owner: Iyotetsu
- Locale: Ehime Prefecture
- Termini: Matsuyama City; Gunchū Port
- Stations: 12
- Website: http://www.iyotetsu.co.jp

Service
- Type: Heavy rail

History
- Opened: 4 July 1896; 130 years ago

Technical
- Line length: 11.3 km (7.0 mi)
- Track gauge: 1,067 mm (3 ft 6 in)
- Electrification: Overhead line, DC 750 V
- Operating speed: 65 km/h (40 mph)
Route map

The Gunchū Line (郡中線, Gunchū-sen) is a 11.3 km railway line owned by Iyotetsu. The line connects Matsuyama with Iyo in Ehime Prefecture, Japan. The line runs southwards from Matsuyama City Station, terminating at Gunchū Port Station.

The line used to be owned by the South Iyo Railway until they merged with Iyotetsu in 1900.

== History ==
The South Iyo Railway opened most of the line from Matsuyama to Gunchū in 1895. At the time, three railway companies operated lines around Matsuyama, which caused inconvenience for both railway operators and users. As a result, the South Iyo Railway, along with the Dōgo Railroad was merged into Iyotetsu in 1900. The line extended to Gunchū Port in 1939 following JNR extension into Matsuyama in 1927. The entire line was electrified in 1950.

== Operations ==
The line is electrified with overhead lines and is single-tracked for the entire line. Trains servicing the entire line runs around every 20 minutes. Trains terminating at Masaki runs in the morning.

== Stations ==
All stations are located in Ehime Prefecture.

Number	Picture	Name		Distance (km)	Connections	Location
IY10		Matsuyama City	松山市	0.0	Iyotetsu: ■Takahama Line, ■Yokogawara Line; Iyotetsu Trams: ■Route 1, ■Route 2, ■Route 4, ■Route 6	Matsuyama
IY25		Dobashi	土橋	0.7		Matsuyama
IY26		Doida	土居田	2.2		Matsuyama
IY27		Yōgo	余戸	3.5		Matsuyama
IY28		Kamata	鎌田	4.2		Matsuyama
IY29		Okada	岡田	5.6		Masaki
IY30		Koizumi	古泉	6.6		Masaki
IY31		Masaki	松前駅	7.9		Masaki
IY32		Jizōmachi	地蔵町	8.6		Masaki
IY33		Shinkawa	新川	9.5		Iyo
IY34		Gunchū	郡中	10.7		Iyo
IY35		Gunchū Port	郡中港	11.3	JR Shikoku: Yosan Line (via Iyoshi Station)	Iyo

=== Ridership ===
No.	Station	Passengers (2023)
IY10	Matsuyama City	16,305
IY25	Dobashi	923
IY26	Doida	2,060
IY27	Yōgo	2,140
IY28	Kamata	951
IY29	Okada	854
IY30	Koizumi	2,121
IY31	Masaki	854
IY32	Jizōmachi	469
IY33	Shinkawa	622
IY34	Gunchū	925
IY35	Gunchū Port	917
