= Tano, Ehime =

Tano 田野村
- Village
- Location within Japan
- Country: Japan
- Prefecture: Ehime Prefecture
- District: Shūfu District (1889-1897), Shūsō District (1897-1956)
- Established: December 15, 1889

Government
  - Type: Village
- Time zone: UTC+9 (JST)
- ISO 3166 code: JP-38

Tano (田野村, Tano-mura)

was a village located in Shūfu District later Shūsō District, Ehime Prefecture.

== Timeline ==
- December 15, 1889 - Due to the municipal status enforcement, the villages of 長野, 田野村上方, 北田野, 高松, and 川根, Shūfu District, merged to form as the village of Tano, Shūfu District.
- April 1, 1897 - Due to Shūfu District merged with Kuwamura District, the village becomes the village of Tano, Shūsō District.
- September 1, 1956 - Merged with the town of Tanbara and parts of the village of Nakagawa to become the town of Tanbara.
- November 1, 2004 - The town of Tanbara merged with the cities of Saijō and Tōyo and the town of Komatsu to become the city of Saijō.
