= Kuwamura District, Ehime =

Former district in Ehime prefecture, Japan

List of Provinces of Japan > Nankaido > Iyo Province > Kuwamura District

Kuwamura (桑村郡, Kuwamura-gun) was a district located in eastern Iyo Province (Ehime Prefecture). In 1897, the district merged with Shūfu District(周敷郡) to become Shūsō District(周桑郡) and the district dissolved. The entire area are now within the city of Saijō.

== Timeline ==
- December 15, 1889 - Due to the municipal status enforcement, the following 7 villages were formed.
  - Village of Nyūgawa ← Villages of Ōshinden, Nyūgawa, Enkaiji, Akarigawa, and Kitadai (Town of Nyūgawa → City of Tōyo → City of Saijō)
  - Village of Yoshioka ← Villages of Kamiichi, Hirooka, Ishinobe, Shinmachi, Yasumochidesaku, and Yasumochi (same as above)
  - Village of Kuniyasu ← Villages of Takata, Kuniyasu, Shin'ichi, and Kuwa (same as above)
  - Village of Miyoshi ← Village of Miyoshi (Town of Miyoshi → City of Tōyo → City of Saijō)
  - Village of Shōnai ← Villages of Miyanouchi, Ōno, Jitsubōji, Fukujōji, Dannoue, Kurodani, and Kawanouchi (same as above)
  - Village of Kusukawa ← Villages of Kusunoki and Kawarazu (same as above)
  - Village of Tokuda ← Villages of Tokunō, Tokunōdesaku, Kota, Tataki, Kōchi, and Yasumochi (Town of Tanbara → City of Saijō)
- April 18, 1897 - The district merged with Shūfu District to become Shūsō District.
