= Komatsu Domain =

Administrative division in Japan during the Edo period

Komatsu Domain 小松藩
- Domain of Japan
- 1636–1871
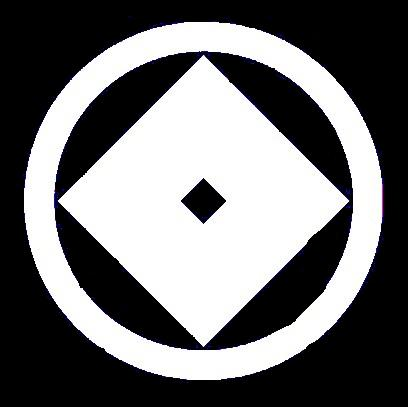
- Mon of the Hitotsuyanagi clan
- Capital: Komatsu jin'ya
- Area
  - Coordinates: 33°53′33.33″N 133°07′07.75″E
- Historical era: Edo period
  - Established: 1636
  - Abolition of the han system: 1871
- Contained within
  - Province: Iyo
- Today part of: Ehime Prefecture

Location of Komatsu jin'ya
Komatsu Domain (Japan)

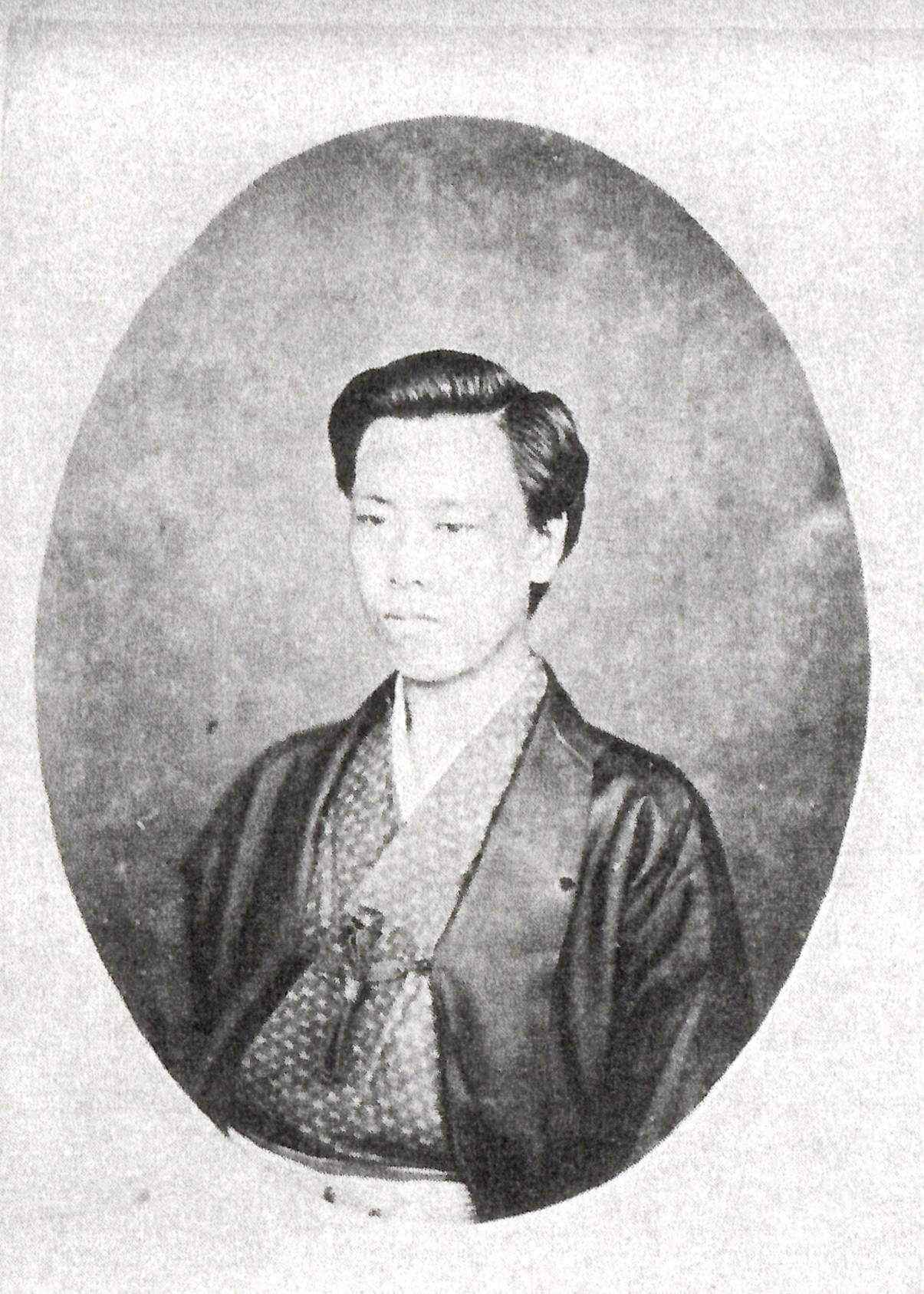
Hitotsuyanagi Yoriaki

Komatsu Domain (小松藩, Komatsu-han) was a feudal domain under the Tokugawa shogunate of Edo period Japan, in what is now eastern Ehime Prefecture on the island of Shikoku. It was centered around Komatsu jin'ya in what snow part of the city of Saijō, Ehime, and was ruled throughout all of its history by a cadet branch of the Hitotsuyanagi clan. Komatsu Domain was dissolved in the abolition of the han system in 1871 and is now part of Ehime Prefecture.

== History ==
In 1636, Hitotsuyanagi Naomori, daimyō of Kanbe Domain in Ise Province received an increase in kokudaka of 18,000 koku and was transferred to Saijō in Iyo Province with a total of 68,000 koku. This marks the start of Saijō Domain. However, Naomori died in Osaka in the same year and his inheritance was divided among his three sons: his heir Naoshige inherited 30,000 koku and became daimyo of Saijō Domain, his second son Naoie inherited 28,000 koku, forming Iyo Kawanoe Domain and later transferred his seat to Ono Domain in Harima Province, and his third son Naoyori became the 10,000 koku daimyō of Komatsu Domain. Naoyori set up a jin'ya in Shinyashiki Village, Sufu County, located west of Saijo, and his descendants would continue to rule the area for 280 years until the end of the Edo period.

In 1642, Hitotsuyanagi Naoie was transferred to Harima and after his death, his territory of 18,600 in Iyo Province was confiscated by the shogunate. In 1665, Hitotsuyanagi Naoki (a son of Naoshige) of Saijo Domain was deprived of his status, leaving only the Komatsu Domain in Iyo Province. During the Kanbun through Genroku eras (1661-1704), Hitotsuyanagi Naoharu, the second daimyō, developed considerable new rice lands. The Ichinokawa Mine was a major source of antimony in the Edo period, and the domain also developed washi paper as a domain monopoly and a major source of revenue. Nevertheless, as with all domains, finances were always tight with the demands of sankin kōtai attendance to the Shogun's court in Edo, and the need to maintain a domain residence in Edo. The third daimyō, Yorinori, was a master of Japanese calligraphy and was highly praised by his peers. During the Kyōhō famine of 1732, although the number of inhabitants needing assistance exceeded 40%, no one in the domain starved, unlike the situation in neighboring Iyo-Matsuyama Domain. As Komatsu Domain was a small domain, it was able to quickly grasp the signs of poor harvests in its territory, and countermeasures were taken. In the last 18th century, although there was occasional unrest, the domain also escaped the bloody peasants revolts experienced by many other domains. The 7th daimyō, Yorichika, established a han school in 1802. Under the 8th daimyō, Yoritsune, the domain entered the bakumatsu period as an early supporter of the new government. Komatsu disputed 51 samurai and ashigaru as its contribution in the Boshin War.

In June 1869, Hitotsuyanagi Yoritsugu was appointed as imperial governor of the domain following the Meiji Restoration, but he died of illness soon after. Yoriakira succeeded as the imperial governor, but in July 1871, the Komatsu Domain was abolished with the abolition of the han system and the establishment of prefectures. "Komatsu Prefecture" was abolished in the same year and incorporated into Ehime Prefecture via Matsuyama Prefecture and Sekitetsu Prefecture. In 1884, Hitotsuyanagi Jōnen, the younger brother of Yoriaki, was ennobled with the kazoku peerage title of viscount.

Among those from the Komatsu Domain who were active in the Meiji period was Baron Kurokawa Michiki, a lieutenant general in the Imperial Japanese Army, military attache to the Crown Prince.

== Holdings at the end of the Edo period ==
As with most domains in the han system, Komatsu Domain consisted of several discontinuous territories calculated to provide the assigned kokudaka, based on periodic cadastral surveys and projected agricultural yields.

- Iyo Province
  - 4 villages in Nii District
  - 11 villages in Shūfu District

== List of daimyō ==
| # | Name | Tenure | Courtesy title | Court Rank | kokudaka |
|---|---|---|---|---|---|
Hitotsuyanagi clan, 1636–1871 (Tozama)
| 1 | Hitotsuyanagi Naoyori (一柳直頼) | 1636–1645 | Inaba-no-kami (因幡守) | Junior 5th Rank, Lower Grade (従五位下) | 10,000 koku |
| 2 | Hitotsuyanagi Naoharu (一柳直治) | 1645–1705 | Hyobu-no-shoyu (兵部少輔) | Junior 5th Rank, Lower Grade (従五位下) | 10,000 koku |
| 3 | Hitotsuyanagi Yorinori (一柳頼徳) | 1705–1724 | Inaba-no-kami (因幡守) | Junior 5th Rank, Lower Grade (従五位下) | 10,000 koku |
| 4 | Hitotsuyanagi Yorikuni (一柳頼邦) | 1724–1744 | Hyobu-no-shoyu (兵部少輔) | Junior 5th Rank, Lower Grade (従五位下) | 10,000 koku |
| 5 | Hitotsuyanagi Yorikazu (一柳頼寿) | 1744–1779 | Mino-no-kami (美濃守) | Junior 5th Rank, Lower Grade (従五位下) | 10,000 koku |
| 6 | Hitotsuyanagi Yoriyoshi (一柳頼欽) | 1779–1796 | Hyobu-no-shoyu (兵部少輔) | Junior 5th Rank, Lower Grade (従五位下) | 10,000 koku |
| 7 | Hitotsuyanagi Yorichika (一柳頼親) | 1796–1832 | Mino-no-kami (美濃守) | Junior 5th Rank, Lower Grade (従五位下) | 10,000 koku |
| 8 | Hitotsuyanagi Yoritsugu (一柳頼紹) | 1832–1869 | Hyobu-no-shoyu (兵部少輔) | Junior 5th Rank, Lower Grade (従五位下) | 10,000 koku |
| 8 | Hitotsuyanagi Yoriakira (一柳頼明) | 1869–1871 | -none- | Junior 5th Rank, Lower Grade (従五位下) | 10,000 koku |

== See also ==
- List of Han
- Abolition of the han system
