= Imabari-Komatsu Expressway =

Expressway in Japan

Imabari-Komatsu Expressway
- 今治小松自動車道 (Imabari-Komatsu Jidōsha-dō)

Route information
- Length: 23.3 km (14.5 mi)
- Existed: 1999–present

Major junctions
- North end: Imabari Interchange; Nishiseto Expressway; National Route 196 in Imabari, Ehime

Section 1
- South end: Iyo Komatsu Junction; Matsuyama Expressway in Saijō, Ehime

Location
- Country: Japan

Highway system
- National highways of Japan; Expressways of Japan

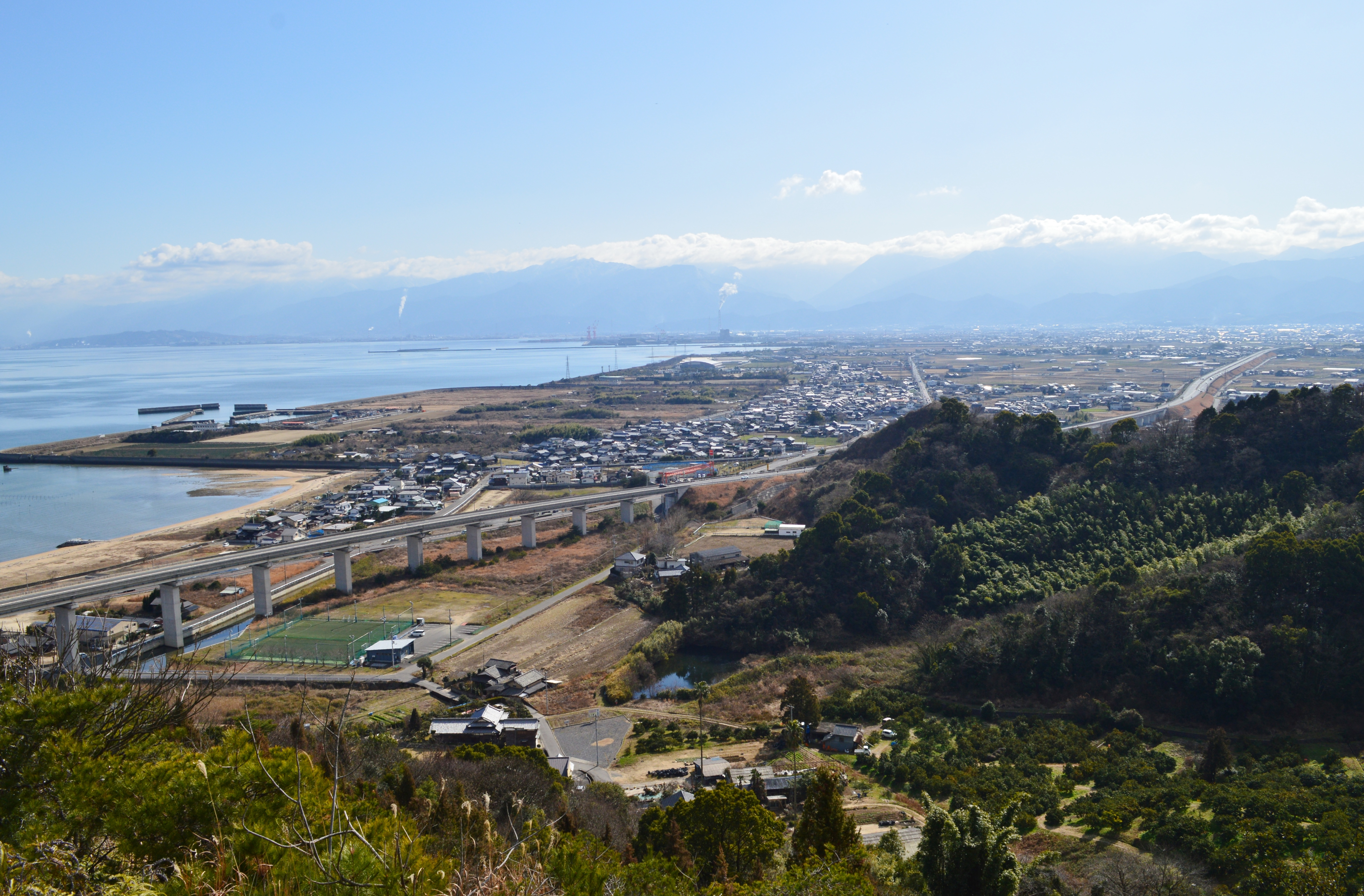
Imabari-Komatsu Expressway in Saijō, Ehime.

Imabari-Komatsu Expressway (今治小松自動車道, Imabari-Komatsu Jidōsha-dō) is a national expressway in Ehime Prefecture. It is owned and operated by the West Nippon Expressway Company (NEXCO West Japan). The route is signed E76 under Ministry of Land, Infrastructure, Transport and Tourism's "2016 Proposal for Realization of Expressway Numbering."

== Junction list ==
The entire expressway is in Ehime Prefecture. TB - toll gate

Location	km	mi	Exit	Name	Destinations	Notes
Imabari	0	0.0	13	Imabari	Nishiseto Expressway– Onomichi, Hiroshima, Fukuyama; National Route 196 (Imabari Bypass)– Matsuyama, Central Imabari, Saijō	Planned
Imabari			TB	Imabari		Planned
Imabari				Imabari-Asakura	Ehime Prefecture Route 163	Planned
Imabari	10.3	6.4	1	Imabari-Yunoura	National Route 196 (Imabari Bypass)	Current northern terminus
Saijō	19.3	12.0	2	Toyo-Tanbara	Ehime Prefecture Route 48– Nyūgawa, Tanbara; Ehime Prefecture Route 144	
Saijō	22.3	13.9	3	Iyo Komatsu-kita	National Route 11 (Komatsu Bypass)	Northbound entrance, southbound exit
Saijō	23.3	14.5	11	Iyo Komatsu	Matsuyama Expressway– Matsuyama, Takamatsu, Okayama, Osaka	Southern terminus
1.000 mi = 1.609 km; 1.000 km = 0.621 mi: Incomplete access; Tolled; Unopened
