= Saijō Domain =

Administrative division in Japan during the Edo period (1636–1871)

Saijō Domain 西条藩
- Domain of Japan
- 1636–1871
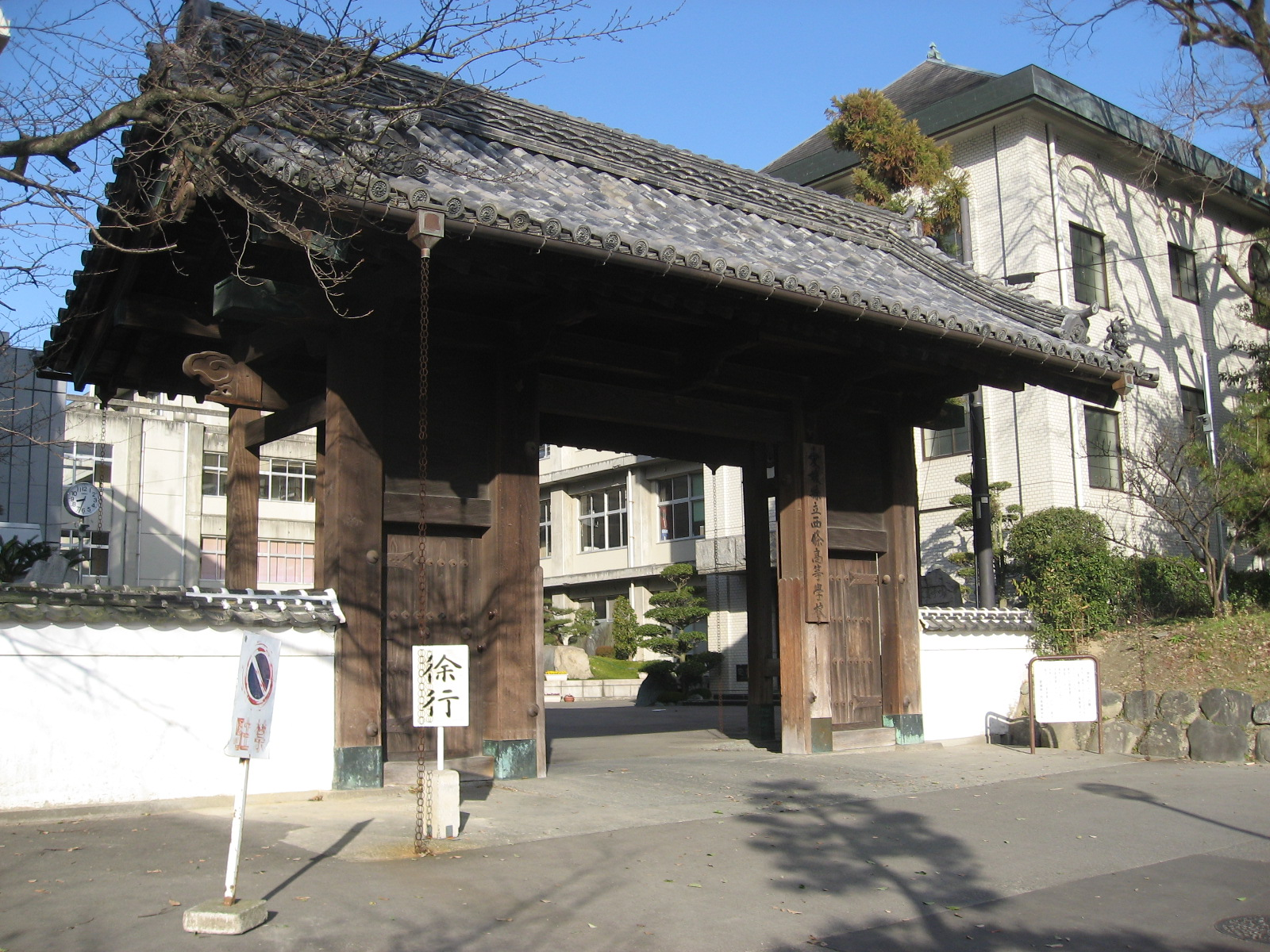
- Saijō jin'ya gate in Saijō, Ehime, Currently the main gate of Saijo Prefectural High School

- Mon of the Matsudaira clan
- Capital: Saijō jin'ya
- Area
  - Coordinates: 33°55′12.86″N 133°10′46.40″E
- Historical era: Edo period
  - Established: 1636
  - Abolition of the han system: 1871
- Contained within
  - Province: Iyo
- Today part of: Ehime Prefecture

Location of Saijō jin'ya
Saijō Domain (Japan)

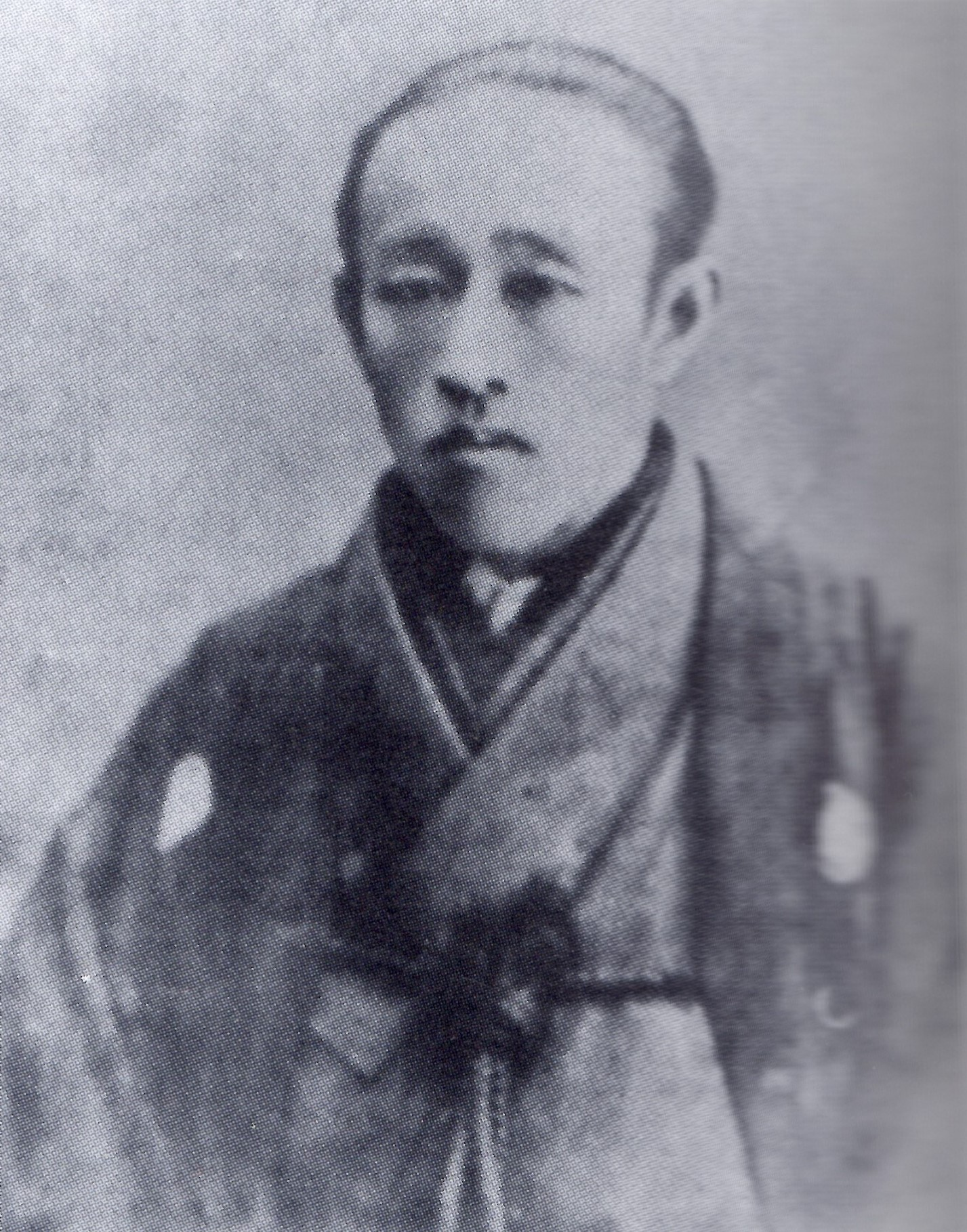
Matsudaira Yorihide

Saijō Domain (西条藩, Saijō-han) was a feudal domain under the Tokugawa shogunate of Edo period Japan, in what is now eastern Ehime Prefecture on the island of Shikoku. It was centered around Saijō jin'ya, and was ruled throughout most of its history by a cadet branch of the Kii Tokugawa clan. Saijō Domain was dissolved in the abolition of the han system in 1871 and is now part of Ehime Prefecture.

== History ==
In 1636, Hitotsuyanagi Naomori, daimyō of Kanbe Domain in Ise Province received an increase in kokudaka of 18,000 koku and was transferred to Saijō in Iyo Province with a total of 68,000 koku. This marks the start of Saijō Domain. He transferred 5,000 koku to his second son, Naoie, and thus the domain officially was rated as 63,000 koku. However, Naomori died in Osaka in the same year and his inheritance was divided among his three sons: his heir Naoshige inherited 30,000 koku and became daimyo of Saijō Domain, his second son Naoie inherited 28,000 koku, forming Iyo Kawanoe Domain and later transferred his seat to Ono Domain in Harima Province, and his third son Naoyori became the 10,000 koku daimyō of Komatsu Domain. Naoshige built the first jin'ya and laid out the jōkamachi. His son Naoki inherited the domain, but gave 5000 koku to his younger brother, reducing the domain to 25,000 koku. However, in 1665, Naoki was dispossessed for negligence of duties and misgovernment, and Saijō Domain became tenryō territory administered directly by the shogunate.

In 1670, Matsudaira Yorizumi, the third son of Tokugawa Yorinobu, daimyō of Kii Domain, was allowed to establish a cadet branch of the clan, and granted Saijō Domain with a kokudaka 30,000 koku, and the Saijō domain was re-established. This domain was positioned as a subsidiary domain under Kii Domain, and was intended as "insurance" in the event that the main Kii Tokugawa clan failed to produce an heir. When the 5th daimyō of Kii Domain, Tokugawa Yoshimune, became shogun, the second daimyō of Saijō, Tokugawa Yoriyoshi, inherited Kii Domain and renamed himself Tokugawa Munenao, and his younger brother, Matsudaira Yoritada inherited Saijō.

The fourth daimyō, Matsudaira Yorisato, issued sumptuary orders to restore the domain's finances, but he retired at the age of 22 due to the difficulty of reforming the administration of the domain due to his poor health. His adopted heir was a younger son of Tokugawa Munenao, Matsudaira Yoriatsu, how later inherited Kii Domain under the name of Tokugawa Harusada. Yoriatsu was succeeded by Matsudaira Yorikata, a son of Tokugawa Munemasa of Kii Domain.

Matsudaira Yoriyuki, the 8th daimyō, opened the han school Tasezendo. The 9th daimyō, Matsudaira Yorisato was the first daimyō of Saijō to visit his domain in over 100 years. Saijō Domain was ruled almost as a part of Kii Domain, with its finances supported by the parent domain and its military incorporated into Kii Domain's structure. Matsudaira Yorizumi, the first daimyō, visited Saijō five times during his 40-year reign; however, in the 200 years after his demise, daimyō of the domain visited only a total of nine times.

Despite their status of a shinpan daimyō and close ties to the Kii Tokugawa clan, in the Bakumatsu period, the domain was quickly showed an allegiance to the Meiji government and participated in the Boshin War as part of the government army. With the abolition of the han system in 1871, the domain became "Saijō Prefecture", which was later incorporated into Ehime Prefecture via Matsuyama Prefecture and Sekitetsu Prefecture. In 1884, the final daimyō of Saijō, Matsudaira Yorihide was ennobled with the title of viscount (shishaku) in the kazoku peerage.

== Holdings at the end of the Edo period ==
As with most domains in the han system, Saijō Domain consisted of several discontinuous territories calculated to provide the assigned kokudaka, based on periodic cadastral surveys and projected agricultural yields.

- Iyo Province
  - 15 villages in Uma District
  - 43 villages in Nii District
  - 3 villages in Shūfu District

== List of daimyō ==
#	Name	Tenure	Courtesy title	Court Rank	kokudaka
Hitotsuyanagi clan, 1636–1665 (Tozama)
1	Hitotsuyanagi Naomori (一柳直盛)	1636	Kenmotsu (監物)	Junior 5th Rank, Lower Grade (従五位下)	68,000 -> 63,000 koku
2	Hitotsuyanagi Naoshige (一柳直重)	1636–1645	Tango-no-kami (丹後守)	Junior 5th Rank, Lower Grade (従五位下)	30,000 koku
3	Hitotsuyanagi Naooki (一柳直興)	1645–1665	Kenmotsu (監物)	Junior 5th Rank, Lower Grade (従五位下)	30,000 -> 25,000 koku
tenryō 1665–1670
Matsudaira clan, 1670–1871 (Shinpan)
1	Matsudaira Yorizumi (松平頼純)	1670–1711	Sakyō-no-daibu (左京大夫)	Junior 4th Rank, Lower Grade (従四位下)	30,000 koku
2	Matsudaira Yoriyoshi (松平頼致)	1711–1716	Sakyō-no-daibu (左京大夫)	Junior 4th Rank, Lower Grade (従四位下)	30,000 koku
3	Matsudaira Yoritada (松平頼渡)	1716–1738	Sakyō-no-daibu (左京大夫)	Junior 4th Rank, Lower Grade (従四位下)	30,000 koku
4	Matsudaira Yorisato (松平頼邑)	1738–1753	Sakyō-no-daibu (左京大夫)	Junior 4th Rank, Lower Grade (従四位下)	30,000 koku
5	Matsudaira Yoriatsu (松平頼淳)	1753–1775	Sakone-no-chūjo (左近衛権少将)	Junior 4th Rank, Lower Grade (従四位下)	30,000 koku
6	Matsudaira Yorikata (松平頼謙)	1775–1795	Shikibu-no-taiyū (式部大輔)	Junior 4th Rank, Lower Grade (従四位下)	30,000 koku
7	Matsudaira Yorimi (松平頼看)	1795–1797	Uta-no-kami (雅楽頭)	Junior 4th Rank, Lower Grade (従四位下)	30,000 koku
8	Matsudaira Yoriyuki (松平頼啓)	1797–1832	Shikibu-no-taiyū (式部大輔)	Junior 4th Rank, Lower Grade (従四位下)	30,000 koku
9	Matsudaira Yorisato (松平頼学)	1832–1862	Sakone-no-chūjo (左近衛権少将); Jijū (侍従)	Junior 4th Rank, Upper Grade (従四位上)	30,000 koku
10	Matsudaira Yorihide (松平頼英)	1862–1871	Sakyō-no-daibu (左京大夫)	Junior 4th Rank, Upper Grade (従四位上)	30,000 koku

== See also ==
- List of Han
- Abolition of the han system
