= E76 =

E76 may refer to:

- European route E76
- King's Indian Defence, Four Pawns Attack, Encyclopaedia of Chess Openings code
- Onomichi-Fukuyama Expressway, Nishiseto Expressway and Imabari-Komatsu Expressway, route E76 in Japan
