= Ichinokawa Mine =

Antimony mine in Japan

Ichinokawa Kōzan
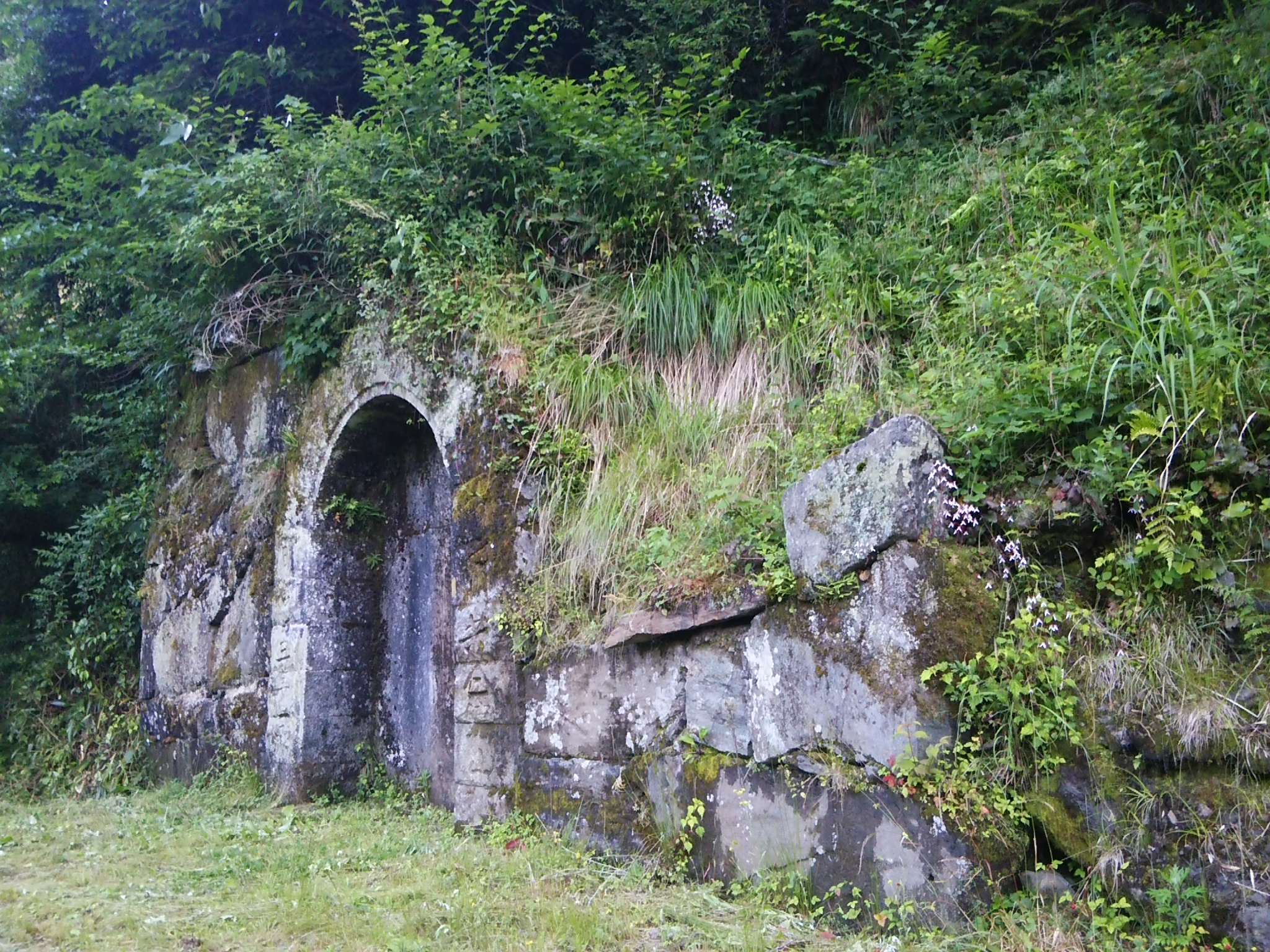
- Interactive map of Ichinokawa Kōzan
- Location: Saijō, Ehime Prefecture, Japan; 33°53′30″N 133°12′24″E
- Products: Antimony
- Opened: 1679
- Closed: 1957
- Company: Sumitomo Group

The Ichinokawa antimony mine (市之川鉱山, Ichinokawa kōzan) was a prominent source of antimony in Saijō, Ehime Prefecture, Japan. Prized high-quality stibnite crystals produced at the mine can be found in museums and private collections around the world.

== History ==
As recorded in The History of Ichinokawa Mine (1901), antimony was first discovered at Ichinokawa in 1679 by Chikanobu Uemonnojo of the Sogabe family. Chikanobu opened the first mines in the area, which were managed privately until 1841, at which point ownership was assumed by Komatsu Domain. Ownership was transferred to Ishizuchi Prefecture (later Ehime Prefecture) in 1871. It was sold to private owners in 1874. After a decade of strife surrounding ownership claims beginning in 1879, government mediation established mining and ownership rights for a group of private stakeholders in 1889.

Due to antimony's use in artillery production, the mine's most prosperous years coincided with the Sino-Japanese War, the Russo-Japanese War, and World War I. The mine went into a long period of decline after World War I.

Sumitomo Group assumed ownership after World War II and closed the mine permanently in 1957.

While the Ichinokawa area is mostly uninhabited today, during the mine's peak years there were over 4,000 residents and 2,000 structures in the mountain community. Unlike Besshi copper mine in nearby Niihama, little external proof of the Ichinokawa mine's existence remains. The main landmark is the portal of the Senga-kō ("deposit of 1,000 loads of ore"), which has been sealed off with concrete. The Ichinokawa Community Center, which sits on the grounds of the former Ichinokawa Elementary School and is a short walk from the Senga-kō portal, has a reference room with historical materials related to the mine. Other exhibits can be seen at the Saijō City Local History Museum and the Ehime Prefectural Science Museum.

== Ichinokawa stibnite ==
Large stibnite crystals produced at Ichinokawa can be found in museums and private collections across the world. Crystals were exhibited at the Kyoto Exhibition (1871) and the 1878 Paris World's Fair, where they were awarded silver medals. A large specimen can be seen in the mineral collections of the Natural History Museum, London.

The hammer-and-chisel mining method used at Ichinokawa is one reason that so many high-quality stibnite crystals were extracted.

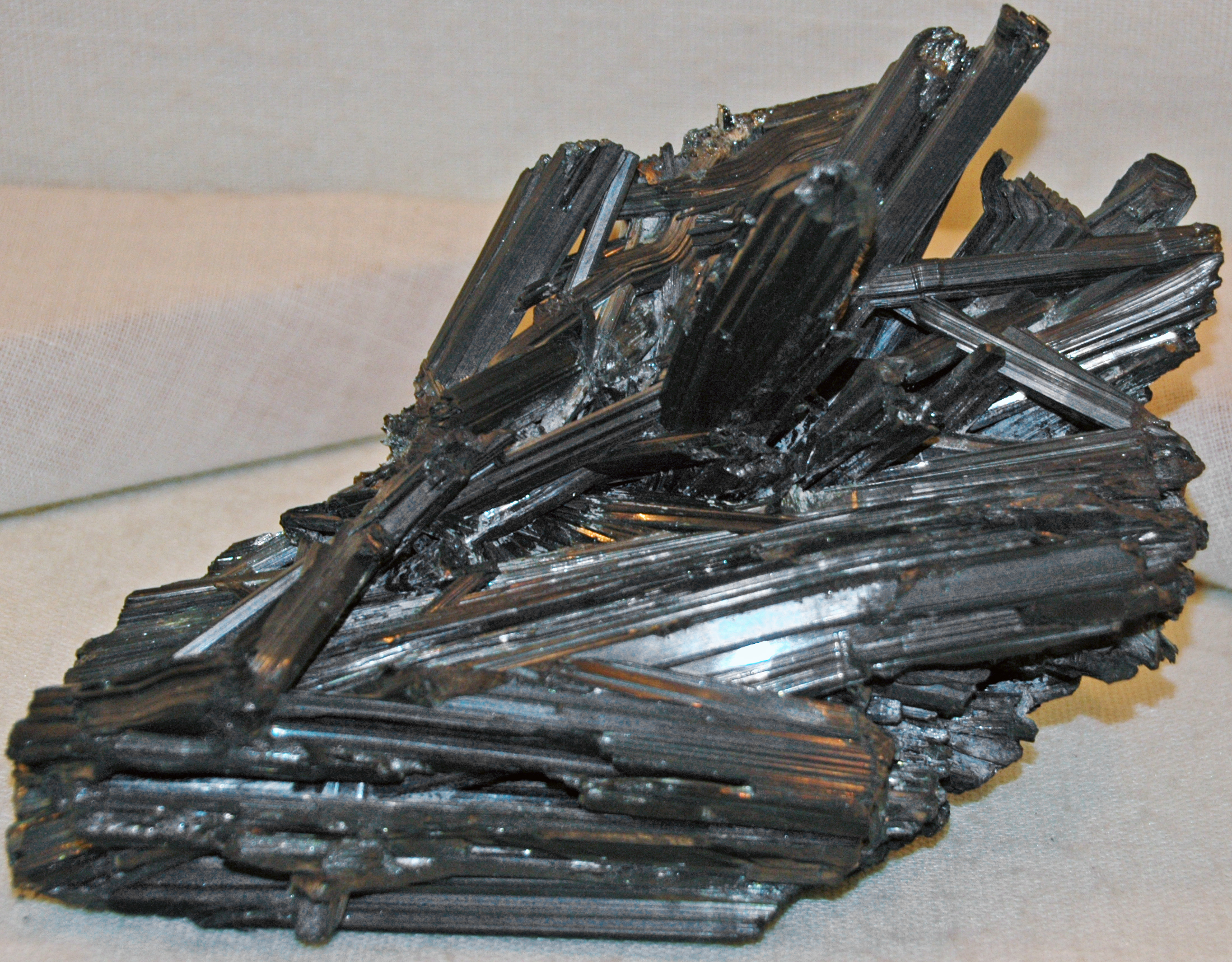
Ichinokawa stibnite in the Harvard Mineralogical Museum
