= Oda Nobutaka =

Samurai, third son of Oda Nobunaga

- 織田 信孝
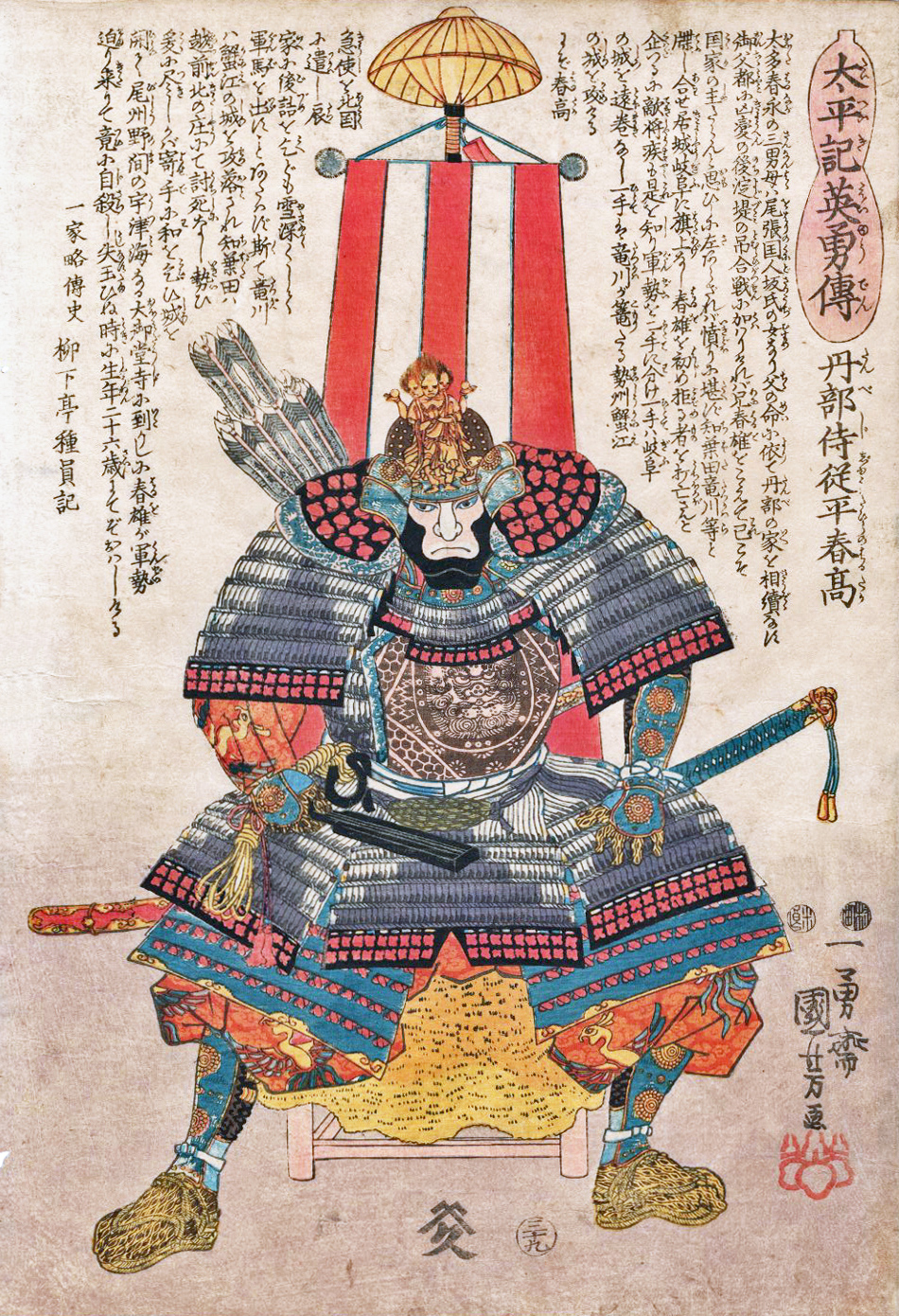

Head of Kanbe clan
- In office 1568–1583

Personal details
- Born: 1558
- Died: 1583 (aged 23–24)
- Relations: Oda Nobunaga (father); Sakashi (mother)
- Nickname: "San Shichi"

Military service
- Allegiance: Oda clan
- Unit: Kanbe clan
- Commands: Kanbe Castle
- Battles/wars: Siege of Ōta Castle (1577); Battle of Yamazaki (1582); Battle of Shizugatake (1583)

Oda Nobutaka (織田 信孝; 1558–1583) was a samurai and member of the Oda clan. He was adopted as the head of the Kanbe clan, which ruled the middle region of Ise Province and so he was also called Kanbe Nobutaka (神戸信孝).

== Biography ==
Nobutaka was born as the third son of Oda Nobunaga and he was called San Shichi (三七), possibly because he was born on the seventh day of the third month, in the Japanese lunar calendar system. His mother was a concubine named Sakashi (坂氏). A theory has it that Nobutaka was actually born twenty days earlier than Nobunaga's second son Oda Nobukatsu but it was reported later than Nobukatsu's birth to Nobunaga and thus he was acknowledged as the third son. According to this theory, it is also believed that the low status of his mother's parents had played a factor as well.

In 1568, after Nobunaga controlled Ise Province, Nobutaka was installed as the head of the Kanbe clan, whose seat was Kanbe Castle, near present-day Suzuka, Mie. The next year, his elder brother, Nobukatsu, became an adopted member of the Kitabatake clan, and ruled a much larger area of southern Ise Province. Nobutaka was reported by missionaries to have a better character than the older Nobukatsu but was ranked lower and held less territory than he did.

In 1577, he besieged Ōta Castle (near the site of present-day Wakayama Castle) and defeated a Jōdo Shinshū Buddhist (Saika Ikki) uprising in Kii province.

In 1582, Nobutaka was commanded to lead an army against Shikoku and had such retainers as Niwa Nagahide and Tsuda Nobuzumi, who was the son of Nobunaga's younger brother Nobuyuki, under his command.

=== Death of Nobunaga ===
While readying his army to cross the sea at Sakai, Nobunaga died at Honnō-ji during an attack by Akechi Mitsuhide. Nobutaka turned back and at Osaka, killed Nobusumi, who was married to a daughter of Mitsuhide. While Nobutaka's suspicion did make some sense, no evidence had turned up that would connect Nobusumi to Mitsuhide. Nobutaka then joined Hashiba Hideyoshi who had turned back from his own campaign, and they fought the Akechi forces at the Battle of Yamazaki.

Nobutaka and his brother Oda Nobukatsu then quarreled over Nobunaga's succession at a council held in Kiyosu Castle. Oda Hidenobu was then declared heir.

Nobutaka gained Mino Province where the eldest son, Oda Nobutada, had ruled before his death by Mitsuhide, but this was still far short of what he had hoped to gain.

=== Conflict with Hideyoshi ===
In 1583, he later allied with Shibata Katsuie and Takigawa Kazumasu to start a war against Hideyoshi, but while Nobutaka was surrounded at Gifu Castle by Nobukatsu, Katsuie lost the Battle of Shizugatake. Kazumasu also lost at Kameyama Castle (Mie), and Nobutaka surrendered.

Nobutaka was sent to Daimidoji at Noma, Chita county, in Owari Province where Minamoto no Yoshitomo had been assassinated at the end of the Heian period.

== Death ==
Under pressure from Hideyoshi and Nobukatsu, he committed suicide. Two dates on 1583, June 19 and June 21 are given for his death.

His waka composed before dying was as follows:

昔より 主を討つ身の 野間なれば

Mukashi yori Shuu o Utsu Mi no Noma nareba

報いを待てや 羽柴筑前

Mukui o Mateya Hashiba Chikuzen

It is a vengeful poem that would be translated as, You had killed the one you had served / may the gods strike you down, Hashiba Hideyoshi.

== Family ==
- Father: Oda Nobunaga (1534–1582)
- Brothers:
  - Oda Nobutada (1557–1582)
  - Oda Nobukatsu (1558–1630)
  - Hashiba Hidekatsu (1567–1585)
  - Oda Katsunaga (1568–1582)
  - Oda Nobuhide (1571–1597)
  - Oda Nobutaka (1576–1602)
  - Oda Nobuyoshi (1573–1615)
  - Oda Nobusada (1574–1624)
  - Oda Nobuyoshi (died 1609)
  - Oda Nagatsugu (died 1600)
  - Oda Nobumasa (1554–1647)
- Sisters:
  - Tokuhime (1559–1636)
  - Fuyuhime (1561–1641)
  - Eihime (1574–1623)
  - Hōonin
  - Sannomarudono (died 1603)
