= Kanbe Castle =

- 神戸城
- Suzuka, Mie Prefecture, Japan
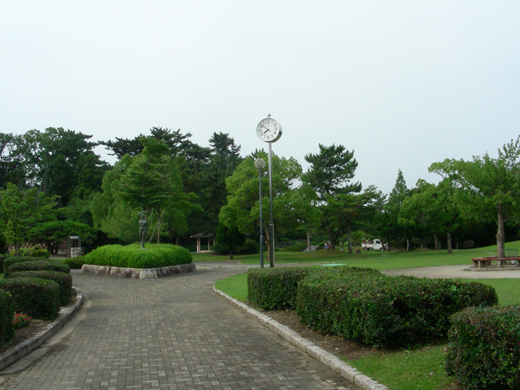
- Kane Park, site of Kanbe Castle

Site information
- Type: flatlands-style Japanese castle
- Open to the public: yes

Location
- Coordinates: 34°52′44.75″N 136°34′38.73″E

Site history
- Built: 1532 to 1555
- Built by: Kanbe Tomomori
- In use: Edo period
- Demolished: 1875

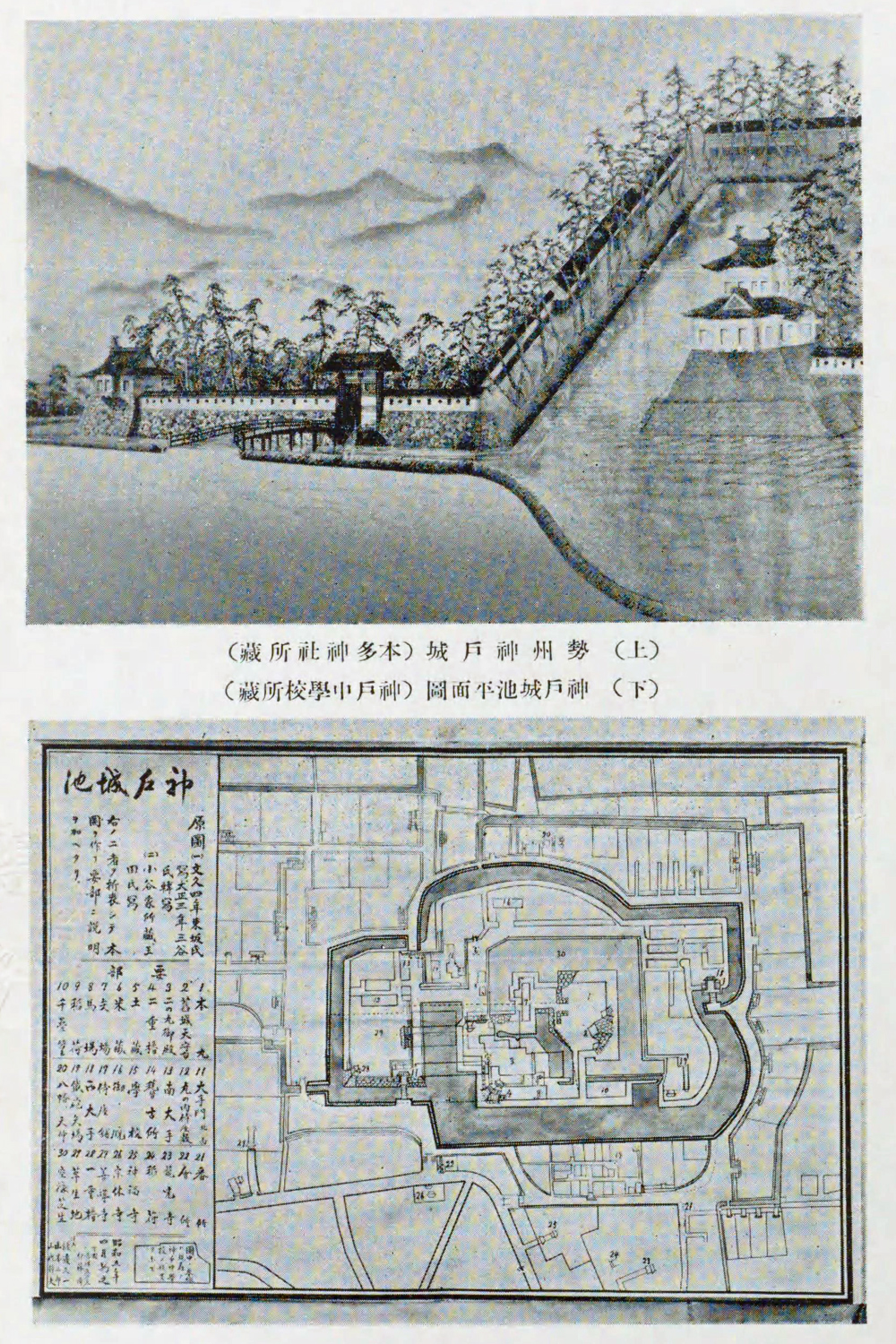
drawings of Kanbe Castle

Kanbe Castle (神戸城, Kanbe-jō) is a Japanese castle located in the city of Suzuka, northern Mie Prefecture, Japan. At the end of the Edo period, Kanbe Castle was home to a cadet branch of the Honda clan, daimyō of Kanbe Domain.

== History ==
The original Kanebe Castle was founded by local warlord Kanbe Tomomori from 1532 to 1555, re-using many materials from an older fortification approximately 500 meters to the southwest. The Kanbe were a cadet branch of the Kitabatake clan who ruled Ise Province during much of the Muromachi period. Following Oda Nobunaga's invasion of Ise Province, he installed his third son Oda Nobutaka as heir to the Kanbe clan. Under the name of Kanbe Nobutaka, he rebuilt the castle and strengthened its defenses. However, during the tumultuous Sengoku period, the castle changed hands several times. Following the Battle of Sekigahara and the establishment of the Tokugawa shogunate, the 50,000 koku Kanbe Domain was created for the Hitotsuyanagi clan. They were transferred in 1636, and the castle was destroyed. The domain given to a cadet branch of the Ishikawa clan with a much reduced kokudaka of 10,000 (later 20,000) koku from 1651 to 1732, and a jin'ya was built on the site of the old castle. The Ishikawa were followed by a cadet branch of the Honda clan (15,000 koku), who ruled to the Meiji restoration. Honda Tadamune received permission to rebuild the castle in 1746, and completed construction in 1748.

The castle layout consists of a complex series of moats surrounding the main and secondary enclosures. The main enclosure housed the tenshu erected by Oda Nobutaka, which records indicate was compound structure with the main tower of five or six stories in the southwest and a smaller tower in the northeast, with roof tiles decorated in gold leaf. This was dismantled in 1595 and its materials used to build a three-story yagura at Kuwana Castle called the "Kanbe Yagura".

In 1875, as per government decrees following the Meiji Restoration, most of the remaining castle structures were demolished. All that survives in situ are portions of stone walls, the stone base of the tenshu, and part of the moat of the main enclosure. The area is designated as a Historic Site of Mie Prefecture. Currently, the center of the castle is occupied by Kanbe Park, and Mie Prefectural Kanbe High School is relocated on the site of Ni-no-maru enclosure. Surviving structures in other locations include the Ni-no-maru Drum Tower, which is now used as the bell tower of the temple of Renka-ji in the Higashitamagaki neighborhood of Suzuka and the former Ōte-mon Gate of the castle, which has been relocated to Kenshō-ji in the Nishihinochō neighborhood of Yokkaichi. At the temple of Ryuko-ji near Kanbe Castle, there is the Zabou-tei Shoin (a Mie Prefecture Tangible Cultural Property) built in 1747 by Honda Tadamune, the first Honda daimyō of Kanbe; however, this structure was relocated from Tokyo in modern times and is not a structure of the original castle.

The castle is a ten-minute walk from Suzukashi Station on the Kintetsu Suzuka Line.

== Literature ==
- Schmorleitz, Morton S. (1974). Castles in Japan. Tokyo: Charles E. Tuttle Co. pp. 144–145. ISBN 0-8048-1102-4.
- Motoo, Hinago (1986). Japanese Castles. Tokyo: Kodansha. ISBN 0-87011-766-1.
- Mitchelhill, Jennifer (2004). Castles of the Samurai: Power and Beauty. Tokyo: Kodansha. ISBN 4-7700-2954-3.
- Turnbull, Stephen (2003). Japanese Castles 1540–1640. Osprey Publishing. ISBN 1-84176-429-9.
