= Ono Domain =

Japanese feudal domain located in Harima Province

Ono Domain 小野藩
- under Tokugawa shogunate Japan
- 1636–1871
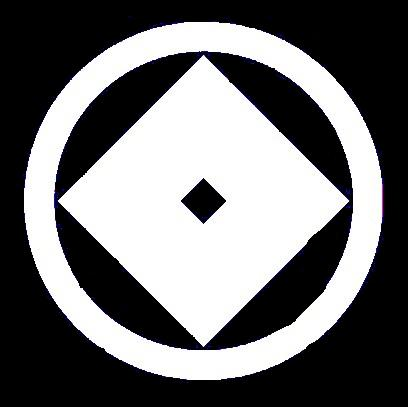
- Mon of the Hitotsuyanagi clan
- Capital: Ono jin'ya
- Area
  - Coordinates: 34°50′35.9″N 134°55′57.7″E
  - Type: Daimyō
- Historical era: Edo period
  - Established: 1636
  - Disestablished: 1871
- Today part of: part of Hyōgo Prefecture

Location of Ono jin'ya
Ono Domain (Japan)

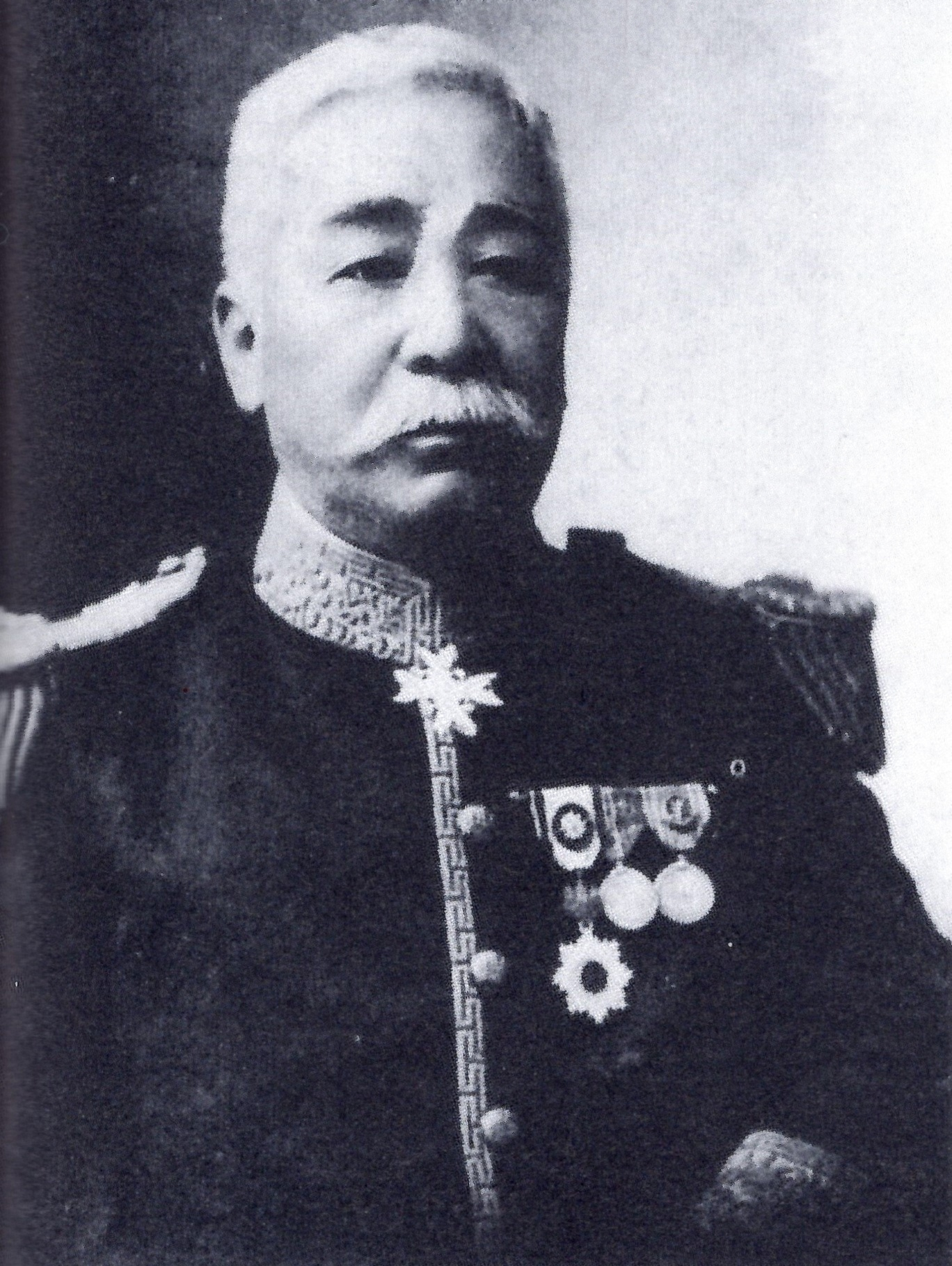
Hitotsuyanagi Suenori, final daimyō of Ono Domain

Ono Domain (小野藩, Ono-han) was a feudal domain under the Tokugawa shogunate of Edo period Japan, in Harima Province in what is now the south-central portion of modern-day Hyōgo Prefecture. It was centered around the Ono jin'ya which was located in what is now the city of Ono, Hyōgo. It was controlled by the tozama daimyō Hitotsuyanagi clan throughout its history.

== History ==
Hitotsuyanagi Naomori was established as daimyō of the 50,000 koku Kanbe Domain under the Tokugawa shogunate in 1601. In 1636, he was awarded with a further increase in kokudaka to 68,000 koku and was transferred to Saijō Domain in Iyo Province. On his death, he divided his holdings between his three sons, with his second son, Hitotsuyanagi Naoie, receiving 23,000 koku and the new title of daimyō of "Kawanoe Domain" in Iyo. This was in addition to the 5000 koku he already had in Harima Province. However, in 1642, he suddenly died shortly after arriving in Edo on sankin kōtai due to a furuncle on his face. As he had no heir, the domain hurriedly married his daughter to the second son of Koide Yoshichika of Sonobe Domain and to arrange a posthumous adoption to avoid attainder. The attempt was only partially successful, as the shogunate used this as an excuse to seize most of the domain's holdings in Iyo, leaving him with only 10,000 koku.

The third through ninth daimyō served in the shogunate in the minor role of Sumpu kaban; however, from the time of the 5th daimyō Hitotsuyanagi Suenaga, the domain's finances deteriorated. In 1833, towards the end of the tenure of the 9th daimyō Hitotsuyanagi Suenobu, large-scale peasant uprisings occurred. In 1836, the han school, Kishokan, was opened. Under the 11th and final daimyō Hitotsuyanagi Suemori, the domain was an early supporter of the imperial cause in the Boshin War. In 1871, with the abolition of the han system, the domain became "Ono Prefecture", which was merged with "Shikama Prefecture", which in turn became part of Hyōgo Prefecture.

The Hitotsuyanagi clan was ennobled with the kazoku peerage title of shishaku (viscount) in 1884.

The site of the Ono Jin'ya is now the location of Ono Elementary School. In addition to a stone monument, a small portion of earthen wall still exists.

== Holdings at the end of the Edo period ==
As with most domains in the han system, Ono Domain consisted of several discontinuous territories calculated to provide the assigned kokudaka, based on periodic cadastral surveys and projected agricultural yields.

- Harima Province
  - 30 villages in Katō District

== List of daimyō ==
#	Name	Tenure	Courtesy title	Court Rank	kokudaka
Hitotsuyanagi clan, 1636-1871 (Tozama)
1	Hitotsuyanagi Naoie (一柳直家)	1636 - 1642	Mimasaka-no-kami (美作守)	Junior 5th Rank, Lower Grade (従五位下)	28,000 koku
2	Hitotsuyanagi Naotsugu (一柳直次)	1642 - 1658	Tosa-no-kami (土佐守)	Junior 5th Rank, Lower Grade (従五位下)	10,000 koku
3	Hitotsuyanagi Suehiro (一柳末礼)	1658 - 1712	Tsushima-no-kami (対馬守); Tosa-no-kami (土佐守)	Junior 5th Rank, Lower Grade (従五位下)	10,000 koku
4	Hitotsuyanagi Suehide (一柳末昆)	1712 - 1737	Tsushima-no-kami (対馬守); Tosa-no-kami (土佐守)	Junior 5th Rank, Lower Grade (従五位下)	10,000 koku
5	Hitotsuyanagi Suenaga (一柳末栄)	1737 - 1779	Tsushima-no-kami (対馬守); Tosa-no-kami (土佐守)	Junior 5th Rank, Lower Grade (従五位下)	10,000 koku
6	Hitotsuyanagi Suefusa (一柳末英)	1779 - 1804	Tosa-no-kami (土佐守); Sakyo-daibu (左京亮)	Junior 5th Rank, Lower Grade (従五位下)	10,000 koku
7	Hitotsuyanagi Sueakira (一柳末昭)	1804 - 1812	Tosa-no-kami (土佐守)	Junior 5th Rank, Lower Grade (従五位下)	10,000 koku
8	Hitotsuyanagi Suechika (一柳末周)	1812 - 1821	Tsushima-no-kami (対馬守)	Junior 5th Rank, Lower Grade (従五位下)	10,000 koku
9	Hitotsuyanagi Suenobu (一柳末延)	1821 - 1855	Tosa-no-kami (土佐守)	Junior 5th Rank, Lower Grade (従五位下)	10,000 koku
10	Hitotsuyanagi Sueyoshi (一柳末彦)	1856 - 1863	Tsushima-no-kami (対馬守); Tosa-no-kami (土佐守)	Junior 5th Rank, Lower Grade (従五位下)	10,000 koku
11	Hitotsuyanagi Suenori (一柳末徳)	1863 - 1871	Tsushima-no-kami (対馬守)	2nd Rank (従二位)	10,000 koku

== See also ==
- List of Han
- Abolition of the han system
