= Saijō, Ehime =

Saijō 西条市
- City
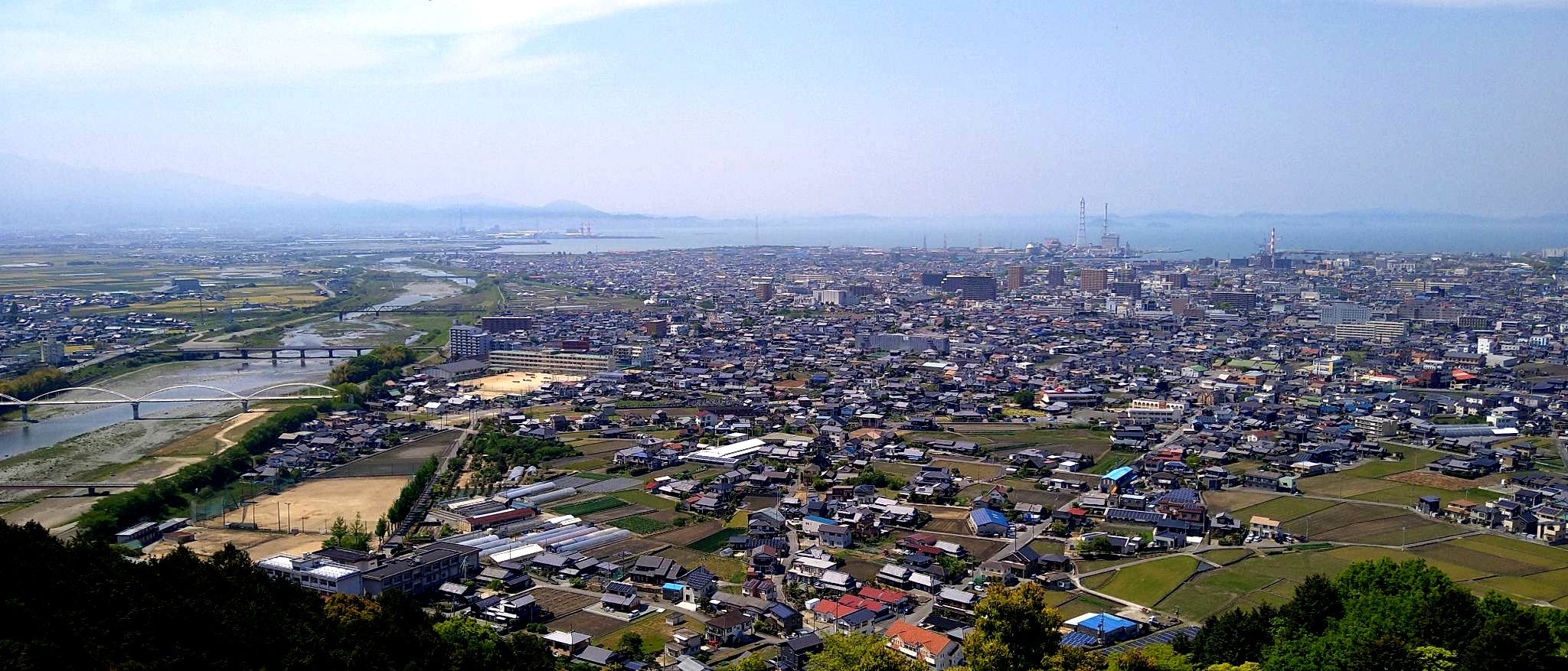
- Panorama view of Saijō, from Saijō Archaeological Museum

- Flag Seal
- Location of Saijō in Ehime Prefecture

- Location in Japan
- Coordinates: 33°55′N 133°11′E
- Country: Japan
- Region: Shikoku
- Prefecture: Ehime
- First official recorded: 137 AD (official)
- City Settled: April 29, 1941

Government
  - Mayor: Mitsuyoshi Ochi (越智三義) - from May 2026

Area
  - Total: 509.98 km^{2} (196.90 sq mi)

Population (August 31, 2022)
  - Total: 106,016
  - Density: 207.88/km^{2} (538.41/sq mi)
- Time zone: UTC+09:00 (JST)
- City hall address: 164 Akeyashiki, Saijō-shi, Ehime-ken; 793-8601
- Climate: Cfa
- Website: Official website

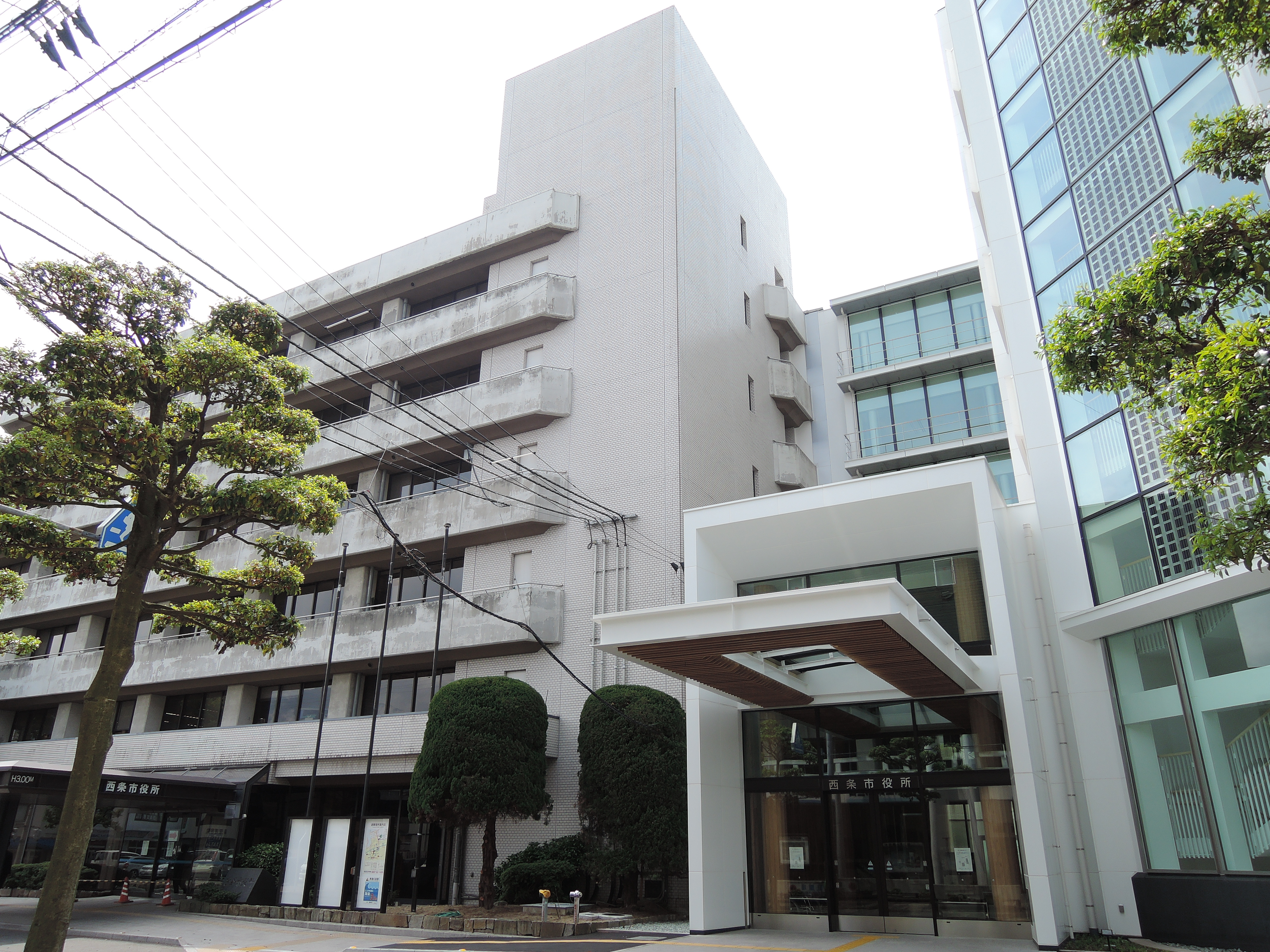
Saijo City Hall

Saijō (西条市, Saijō-shi) is a city in Ehime Prefecture, Japan. As of 1 September 2022, the city had an estimated population of 106,016 in 58,803 households and a population density of 210 persons per km^{2}. The total area of the city is 509.98 square kilometres (196.90 sq mi).

== Geography ==
Saijō is in central Ehime Prefecture on the island of Shikoku and is bordered by the Seto Inland Sea to the north. It sits at the base of Mount Ishizuchi, the tallest peak in western Japan. The consolidated city of Saijō encompasses a broad area, spreading out across the entire Dōzen Plain from the foothills of the Ishizuchi Mountain Range to the Seto Inland Sea (the former Saijō City, Tōyo City, Komatsu Town and Tanbara Town), and also contains smaller communities extending into the lower reaches of the mountains. The Dōzen Plain is crossed by several rivers, the largest being the Kamo River and the Nakayama River.

The main city of Saijō is known for natural spring water. Signs throughout the city and at the city's train station call Saijō the "Spring Water Capital of Japan." Numerous fountains, known locally as uchinuki, are scattered throughout the city where water is frequently bottled by locals and visitors alike. Most private dwelling houses also drill private wells to take advantage of the water. A famous freshwater spring known as Kōbōsui, named for Kūkai (also known as Kōbō-Daishi), gushes from the bottom of Saijō harbor and is visited by locals and Buddhist pilgrims alike to drink and worship.

=== Origin of name ===
The first appearance of the name Saijō in written record is a letter from third Kamakura Shōgun Minamoto no Sanetomo recognizing the jurisdiction over the region of the Kōno clan that was included in the Yoshōki, a history of the clan written centuries later. Some regional historians such as Yuzuru Yamauchi challenge the veracity of that document, arguing that the first reliably datable extant document referring to Saijō is from the end of the Kamakura period. The etymology of the name Saijō itself is unclear. One possible origin suggested in extant documents from Kikō-ji Temple in Niihama is that the region was once divided into a "western district" (the literal meaning of Saijō) and an eastern district (Tōjō, now Niihama) by the small group of mountains that lie between the two cities. The most common narrative follows this interpretation and attributes both the name and the geographical boundaries of Saijō to the Taika Reforms of the 7th century, though this origin has been disputed for lack of concrete historical evidence.

=== Neighbouring municipalities ===
Ehime Prefecture

- Imabari
- Kumakōgen
- Niihama
- Tōon

Kōchi Prefecture

- Ino

=== Climate ===
Saijō has a humid subtropical climate (Köppen Cfa) characterized by warm summers and cool winters with light snowfall. The average annual temperature in Saijō is 14.1 °C. The average annual rainfall is 1839 mm with September as the wettest month. The temperatures are highest on average in August, at around 25.3 °C, and lowest in January, at around 3.0 °C.

Climate data for Saijō (1991−2020 normals, extremes 1978−present)
Month	Jan	Feb	Mar	Apr	May	Jun	Jul	Aug	Sep	Oct	Nov	Dec	Year
Record high °C (°F)	19.0 (66.2)	23.1 (73.6)	27.9 (82.2)	32.0 (89.6)	34.3 (93.7)	36.8 (98.2)	38.1 (100.6)	38.3 (100.9)	36.7 (98.1)	32.9 (91.2)	25.6 (78.1)	21.3 (70.3)	38.3 (100.9)
Mean daily maximum °C (°F)	9.6 (49.3)	10.1 (50.2)	13.6 (56.5)	19.0 (66.2)	24.0 (75.2)	26.6 (79.9)	30.8 (87.4)	31.8 (89.2)	27.7 (81.9)	22.6 (72.7)	17.2 (63.0)	12.0 (53.6)	20.4 (68.8)
Daily mean °C (°F)	5.7 (42.3)	6.0 (42.8)	9.1 (48.4)	14.0 (57.2)	18.9 (66.0)	22.5 (72.5)	26.6 (79.9)	27.4 (81.3)	23.7 (74.7)	18.4 (65.1)	12.9 (55.2)	7.9 (46.2)	16.1 (61.0)
Mean daily minimum °C (°F)	1.9 (35.4)	1.9 (35.4)	4.6 (40.3)	9.1 (48.4)	14.1 (57.4)	19.1 (66.4)	23.2 (73.8)	23.8 (74.8)	20.3 (68.5)	14.5 (58.1)	8.8 (47.8)	4.0 (39.2)	12.1 (53.8)
Record low °C (°F)	−4.5 (23.9)	−7.7 (18.1)	−3.3 (26.1)	0.4 (32.7)	5.3 (41.5)	10.2 (50.4)	16.4 (61.5)	17.9 (64.2)	11.4 (52.5)	4.7 (40.5)	0.4 (32.7)	−3.2 (26.2)	−7.7 (18.1)
Average precipitation mm (inches)	53.2 (2.09)	69.1 (2.72)	109.7 (4.32)	103.3 (4.07)	127.0 (5.00)	208.9 (8.22)	185.6 (7.31)	125.2 (4.93)	230.1 (9.06)	151.9 (5.98)	70.5 (2.78)	59.3 (2.33)	1,493.5 (58.80)
Average precipitation days (≥ 1.0 mm)	7.3	8.8	10.8	9.8	8.9	12.1	9.8	7.7	10.7	8.3	7.3	7.7	109.2
Mean monthly sunshine hours	125.0	131.8	162.6	185.6	200.9	139.8	177.2	204.1	140.3	149.9	128.4	120.4	1,865.9
Source: JMA

== Demographics ==
Per Japanese census data, the population of Saijō has remained relatively steady since the 1960s.

Historical population
Year	Pop.	±%
1960	116,523	—
1970	108,270	−7.1%
1980	112,961	+4.3%
1990	115,251	+2.0%
2000	114,548	−0.6%
2010	112,091	−2.1%
2020	104,791	−6.5%

=== Language ===
Residents of Saijō speak the Tōyo (eastern Ehime) variation of the Iyo dialect, which is part of the Western Japanese language group and similar in many ways to Kansai dialect. Due to some local variations in the dialect, people in Saijō refer to their particular form of Tōyo dialect as Saijō dialect (Saijō-ben).

== History ==
=== Prehistory ===
The Saijō area was part of ancient Iyo Province and has been inhabited at least as early as the Jōmon period, as evidenced by earthenware dated to approximately 6000 BC discovered in the Ichikura highland region. A large number of artifacts dating to the middle and late Yayoi period have been unearthed on and around Mount Hachidō. The significant clustering of burial mounds from the later Kofun period in the highlands has led archaeologists to believe that the flat plain on which modern Saijō sits was either too cold or too close to the Seto Inland Sea for tomb construction.

=== Medieval to Early Modern ===
The history of the region from the Kamakura period to the beginning of the Edo period is difficult to piece together, in part because much of the area was destroyed as a result of Kobayakawa Takakage's campaign to subdue Iyo Province during the Invasion of Shikoku.

At the beginning of the Kamakura period, the shogunate established the powerful Kōno clan as governors (shugo) over the entire Iyo Province, including Saijō. The Kōno had long held power over the region as manorial lords of the Saijō area. However, in 1342, Ashikaga Takauji ordered the invasion of Iyo Province by the subordinate Hosokawa clan as part of a bid to consolidate the shogunate's power over all of Shikoku. The Hosokawa clan assumed control over a large portion of the area that would last until the Warring States Period, and Saijō was ruled by proxy by the Ishikawa clan from Takakogi Castle in the present day Sunouchi district.

During the tumult of the establishment of the Tokugawa Shogunate, Saijō was ruled by a series of lords until the establishment of Saijō Domain in 1636. Hitotsuyanagi Naomori was appointed lord of this domain, but died of illness in Osaka on the way to his new fiefdom. His successors ruled for two generations until attainder of the domain by the shogunate in 1665 for political reasons including a peasant rebellion. In 1670 the shogunate installed Matsudaira Yorizumi, a grandson of Tokugawa Ieyasu, whose descendants ruled for 10 generations until the Meiji Restoration.

The geography of Saijō underwent great changes during the Edo period. The second Hitotsuyanagi ruler, Naoshige, built Saijō Castle and diverted the Kita River to create a moat. The former castle grounds now house Saijō High School, one of a few public schools in Japan contained within a moat and castle gate. Flood control projects for the Kamo River and land reclamation from the Seto Inland Sea began during the end of the Warring States Period and continued through the Edo Period, with major reclamation projects undertaken by the Matsudaira family as a means to increase their personal land holdings, 20000 koku of which were lost when they were reassigned to Saijō.

=== Modern ===
After the Meiji Restoration, Saijō Domain and adjacent Komatsu Domain became Saijō Prefecture and Komatsu Prefecture, respectively, in 1871. That same year, both prefectures were absorbed by the new Matsuyama Prefecture, which would be renamed Ishizuchi Prefecture before being combined with Kamiyama Prefecture to form the current Ehime Prefecture in 1873. The area was divided into villages within Nii District, Ehime with the establishment of the modern municipalities system on December 15, 1889. The town of Saijō was created with the merger of the villages of Tamatsu (玉津村), Omachi (大町村), and Kansai (神拝村) on February 11, 1925. On April 29, 1941, Saijō merged with the villages of Iioka (飯岡村), Kanbe (神戸村), Tachibana (橘村) and the town of Himi (氷見町) and was raised to city status.

On November 1, 2004, Saijō absorbed the city of Tōyo, and the towns of Komatsu and Tanbara (both from Shūsō District) were create the new and expanded city of Saijō.

In 2004, Saijō experienced its worst typhoon season on record. A series of typhoons struck from August to the end of September, with Typhoon 21 (September 28–29) causing 5 deaths and 5.9 billion yen in damage. The typhoons hit the mountain communities hardest, exacerbating the gradual aging and depopulation trends of these areas. The scale of the 2004 disaster was attributed to twin factors of a lack in public disaster awareness mechanisms and environmental issues such as concrete dams and deforestation. In response to the disaster, Mayor Kōtarō Itō established a Public Safety Division in 2006 and began a partnership with the Kyoto University Graduate Environmental Studies Department in 2007 to help make the city better prepared for emergencies. Programs instituted since then include “Town Watching” and mandatory sixth-grade disaster preparedness education. Both of these programs have created ties between Saijō and the city of Hue in Vietnam, which has implemented them.

== Government ==
Saijō has a mayor-council form of government with a directly elected mayor and a unicameral city council of 28 members. Saijō contributes four members to the Ehime Prefectural Assembly.

In terms of national politics, Saijō is part of Ehime 2nd district of the lower house of the Diet of Japan. Prior to 2022, the city was part of Ehime 3rd district.

== Economy ==
As the extended Saijō area comprises mountain forests, farmland, and coastline, the city has a diverse economy.

Logging was the major industry in the mountains Ōfuki village region, and the population of the area swelled during the postwar construction boom until the 1960s, when a shift to foreign lumber imports decimated the local industry. The accompanying population decline was severe, and the average age in Ōfuki as of 2011 is 67. In addition to logging, mining was also a major part of the mountain economy. The nearby Ichinokawa Mine was founded at the beginning the Edo period and was a major source of antimony until its closure due to lack of economic viability in 1957. Large stibnite crystals taken from the mine are on display both in Saijō and in museums all over the world. The mine was controlled for generations by the Sogabe family before being purchased in the Showa period by the Sumitomo Metal Mining Co., which also managed the nearby Besshi copper mine. All that remains of the mine complex today is a sealed-off stone gateway leading to one of the larger mine shafts.

In contrast to the decline of mountain-based industries in the middle of the Showa period, agriculture and coastal industries grew consistently through the economic boom period before experiencing some decline after the beginning of the recession in 1991. In 1964, Saijō was designated the "New Tōyo Industrial Development City", accompanied by increased coastal reclamation projects and the development of heavy industry. This allowed the Saijō port industrial zone to compete with the already developed Tōyo City and Niihama City coastal chemical industries. Asahi Breweries opened a manufacturing plant in the main port area in 1996. The Imabari Shipbuilding Company maintains a shipyard in Saijo. The company's 800-t cranes are among the largest of their kind in the world and are a major visual landmark. The coastal area of Saijō forms the largest industrial zone in Shikoku, and covers a wide variety of fields, including materials, semiconductors, shipbuilding, beverages, power generation, and steel. The value of industrial shipments from Saijō is larger than that of Kochi Prefecture as a whole.

Away from the coastline, Coca-Cola operates its Shikoku bottling plant in Komatsu. Panasonic Healthcare had a factory in the Iioka area that closed in 2013.

The Saijo Plain in the center of the city, which is located downstream of the Kamo and Nakayama river systems, is known as a breadbasket, with production flowers, vegetables, and fruit trees, making it one of the leading agricultural areas in Ehime Prefecture. Saijō's farms and orchards produce many varieties of crops, and the region is particularly known for producing the herbs used in the traditional spring porridge nanakusa-no-sekku, eggplant, roses, persimmons, and spinach. The Japan Agricultural (JA) Group operates several permanent farmers' markets in the Saijō region.

== Education ==
Saijō has 26 public elementary schools and ten public middle schools operated by the city government. The city has five public high schools operated by the Ehime Prefectural Board of Education.

== Transportation ==
=== Railways ===
Shikoku Railway Company - Yosan Line

- Iyo-Saijō - Ishizuchiyama - Iyo-Himi - Iyo-Komatsu - Tamanoe - Nyūgawa - Iyo-Miyoshi

=== Highways ===
- Matsuyama Expressway
- Imabari-Komatsu Expressway
- National Route 11
- National Route 192
- National Route 194
- National Route 196

=== Ports ===
- Port of Toyo

== Sister cities ==
- Baoding, China

== Local attractions ==
=== Festivals ===
Saijō is famous for its three fall festivals, held annually from October 14–17, which feature over 100 hand-carried wooden floats known as danjiri or taikodai (depending on the festival) that belong to neighborhood associations across the city. These floats are up to 5 meters tall and weigh between 600 and 800 kilograms. The festivals have been celebrated since the Edo period.

Saijō's festivals are known as the Iwaoka Shrine Festival (Oct. 14–15), Isono Shrine Festival (Oct. 15–16), and Iizumi Shrine Festival (Oct. 16–17), with the largest number of danjiri (over 80) taking part in the Isono Shrine Festival. The Isono Shrine Festival begins at midnight of the 15th with a ceremony at Isono Shrine inviting a god into the portable shrine known as the Goshinyō, after which the danjiri and four two-wheeled mikoshi roam the city for two days. The float-bearers wear traditional outfits and sing a local variation of the Ise Ondo, signifying the region's historical relationship to Ise Grand Shrine in Mie Prefecture. The festival ends with the kawa-iri, where the Goshinyō and 11 danjiri are carried into the Kamogawa River while the other floats keep watch from the bank.

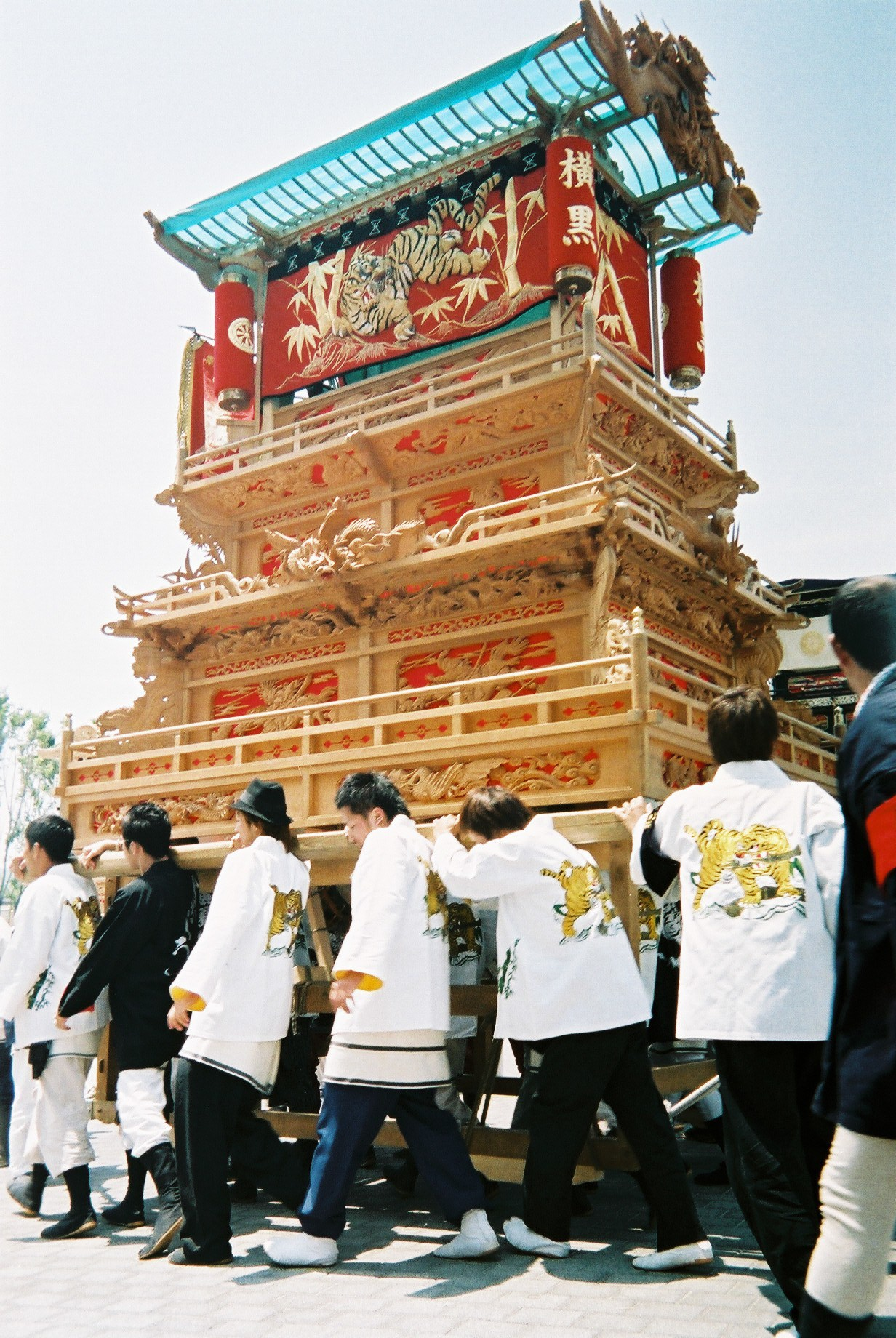
A danjiri float in Saijō's fall harvest festival

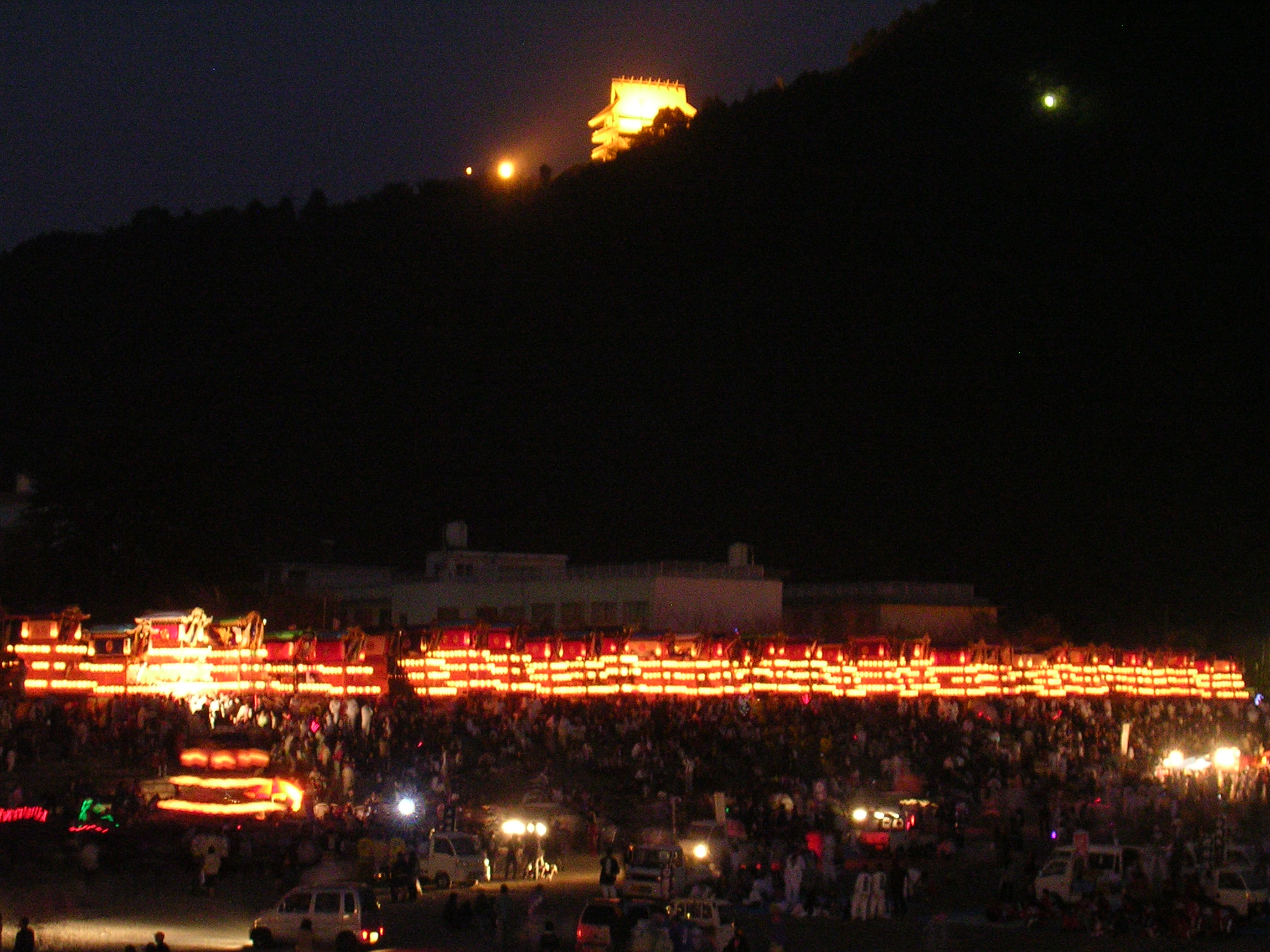
The kawa-iri portion of the Isono Shrine Festival.

== Points of interest ==
The Railway History Park in Saijō

This museum located next to Iyo-Saijō Station houses a first-generation 0 Series Shinkansen bullet train car and a JNR Class DF50 diesel locomotive (No. DF50 1), as well as exhibits detailing the history of railways in Shikoku. In July 2014, a new South Wing opened, featuring a Class C57 steam locomotive, a KiHa 65 express diesel multiple unit train car, a Class DE10 diesel locomotive, and one car of the former experimental Gauge Change Train capable of running on both express and Shinkansen tracks. Located next to the museum is the Shinji Sogō Memorial Museum and Saijo's Tourist Information Center. A life-size danjiri float can be viewed year-round in the tourist information center.

Shikoku Pilgrimage

The Saijō area is home to five Buddhist temples of the 88-temple Shikoku Pilgrimage: Yokomine-ji, Kōon-ji, Hōju-ji, Kichijō-ji, and Maegami-ji.

Ioki Memorial Museum

Located next to Saijō High School in the city's center, this museum displays biographical artifacts and sculptures by the famous sculptor and Saijō-native Ioki Itō (1918–1992). The museum possesses most of his award-winning pieces, and over 40 of Ioki's other sculptures can be viewed outdoors in various places around Saijō.

Ishizuchi Shrine

Ishizuchi Shrine consists of a complex of four shrines located on Mount Ishizuchi. The main shrine is situated at the base of the mountain, and there are shrines on the summit and near the landing of the Ishizuchi Ropeway. Constructed to venerate the mountain itself, the Ishizuchi cult dates back to the Nara period. The main shrine was built in the Meiji period after the shinbutsu bunri (the state enforced separation of Shinto and Buddhism) caused nearby Maegami-ji Temple to lose its status as headquarters for Ishizuchi worship. Ishizuchi Shrine holds a 10-day ceremony and festival beginning on July 1 to mark the official opening of climbing season.

Saijō Archaeological History Museum

This three-story building located in the "Citizen's Forest" on Mount Hachidō displays artifacts unearthed in the region, the oldest holdings being pottery and tools dating back to the Yayoi period. The third floor features a gallery for special exhibitions, and visitors can see as far as the Nishiseto Expressway from the museum balcony. Two Yayoi period dwellings were reconstructed on the top of Mount Hachidō and are accessible via several trails leaving from the museum. The exterior of the museum is illuminated at night.

Nishiyama Kōryū-ji

One of the designated "20 Sacred Places of Shikoku", areas associated with Kūkai but not part of the 88-temple pilgrimage, this Shingon temple is renowned in Shikoku for its fall foliage. It is located in Tanbara on the eastern side of the Takanawa mountain range.

Gokuraku-ji

The head temple of the Ishizuchisan Shingon sect founded by En no Gyōja in the year 680.

Horseshoe crabs

The Saijō area is known for Tachypleus tridentatus, an Asian species of horseshoe crab. This species is known by the common name "helmet crabs" (kabutogani). The Tōyo Cultural Center features an exhibit on the crabs and several live specimens on display. A mascot character named "Kabuchan", a horseshoe crab with a heart on its underside, was created in Saijō.

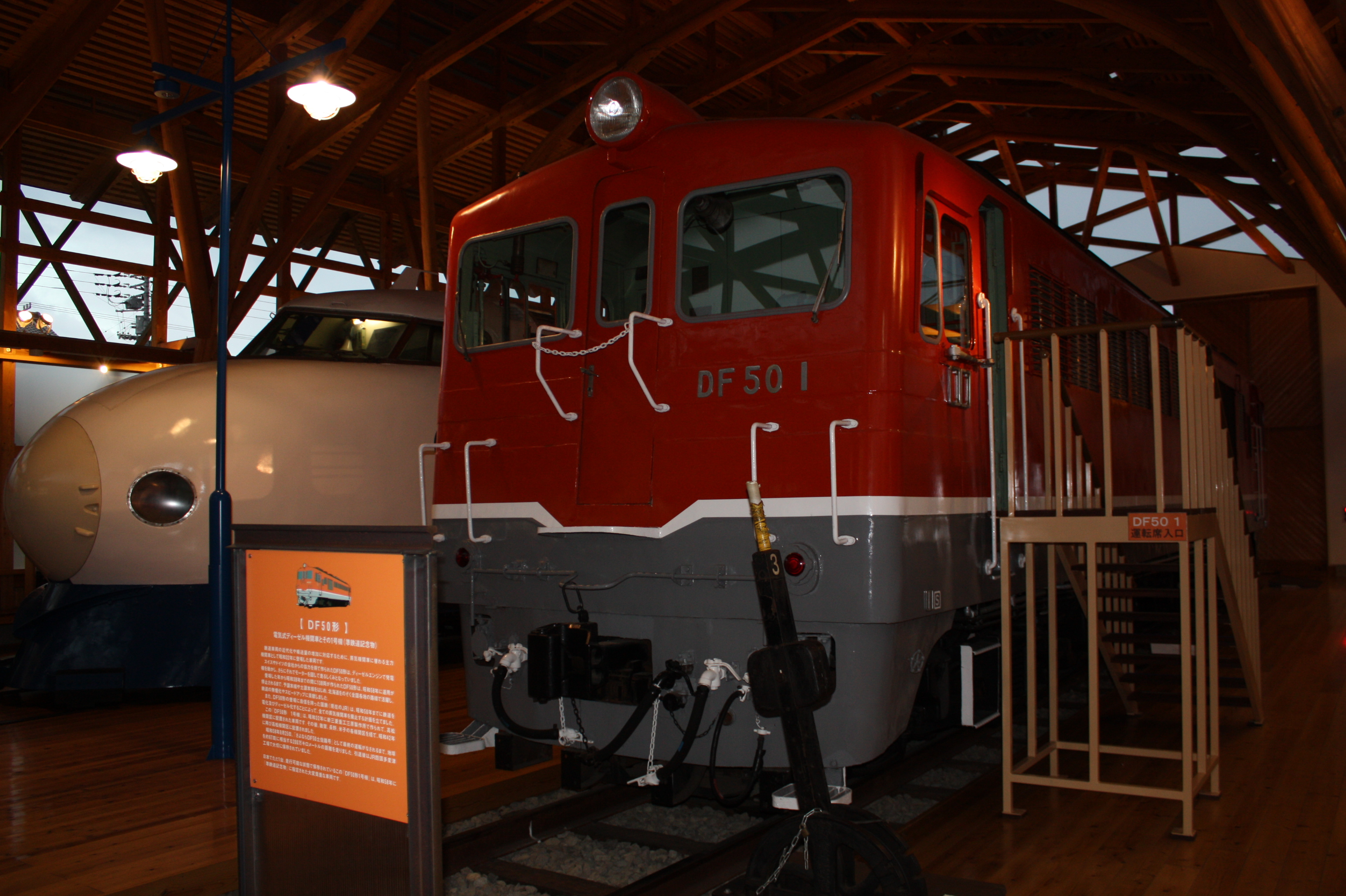
Exhibits inside the Railway History Park

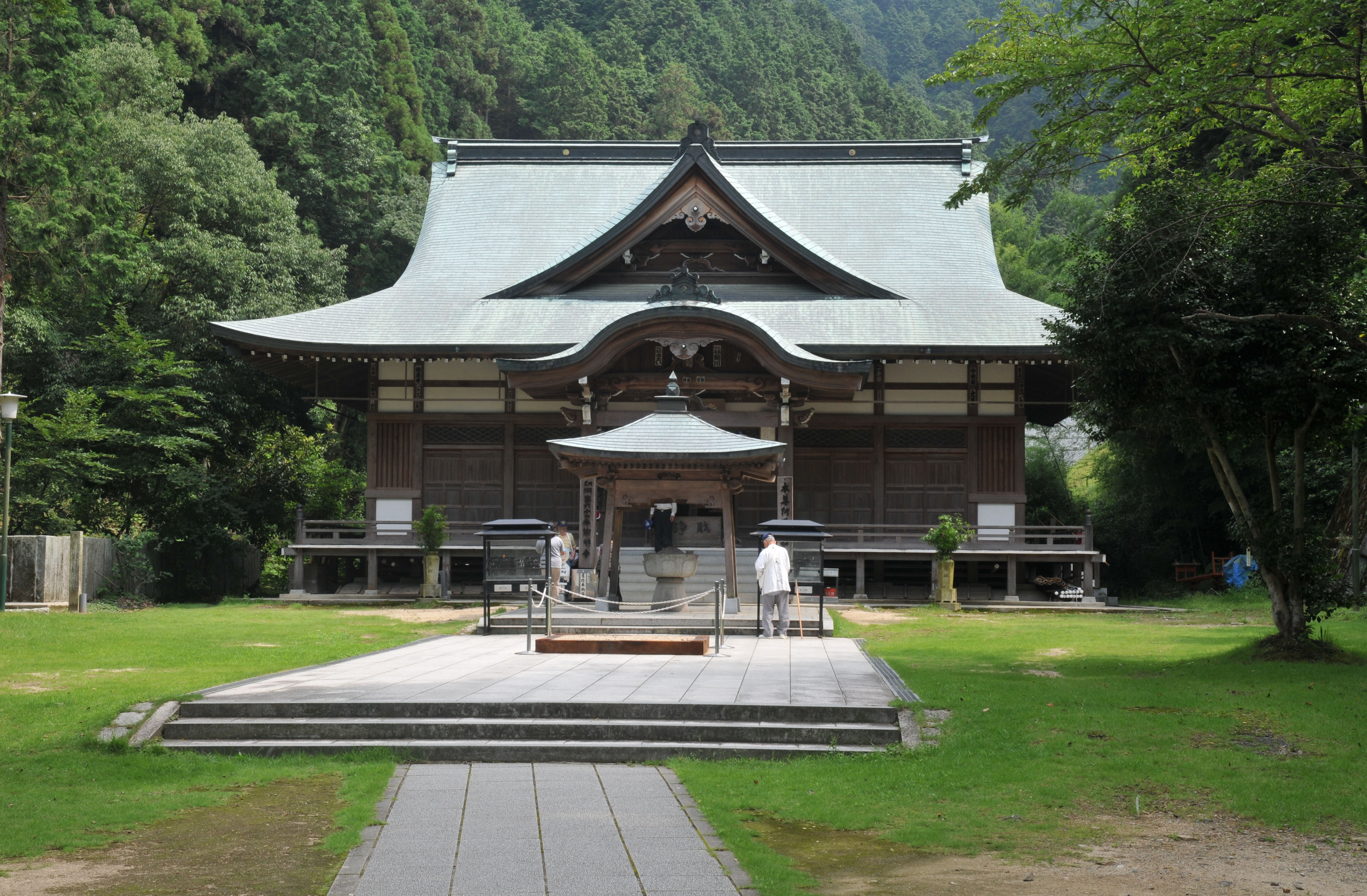
Maegami-ji Temple

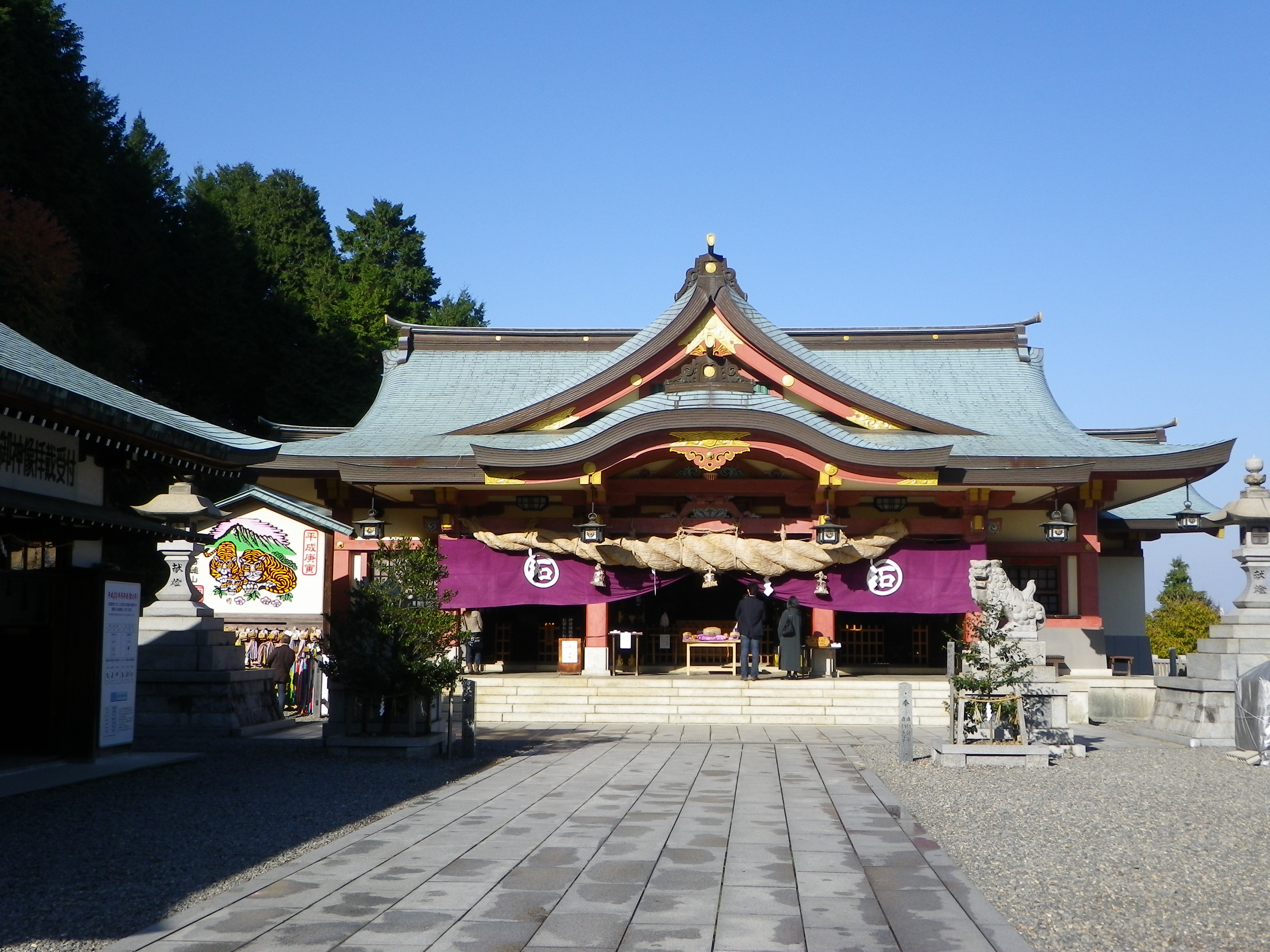
Ishizuchi Shrine, main shrine

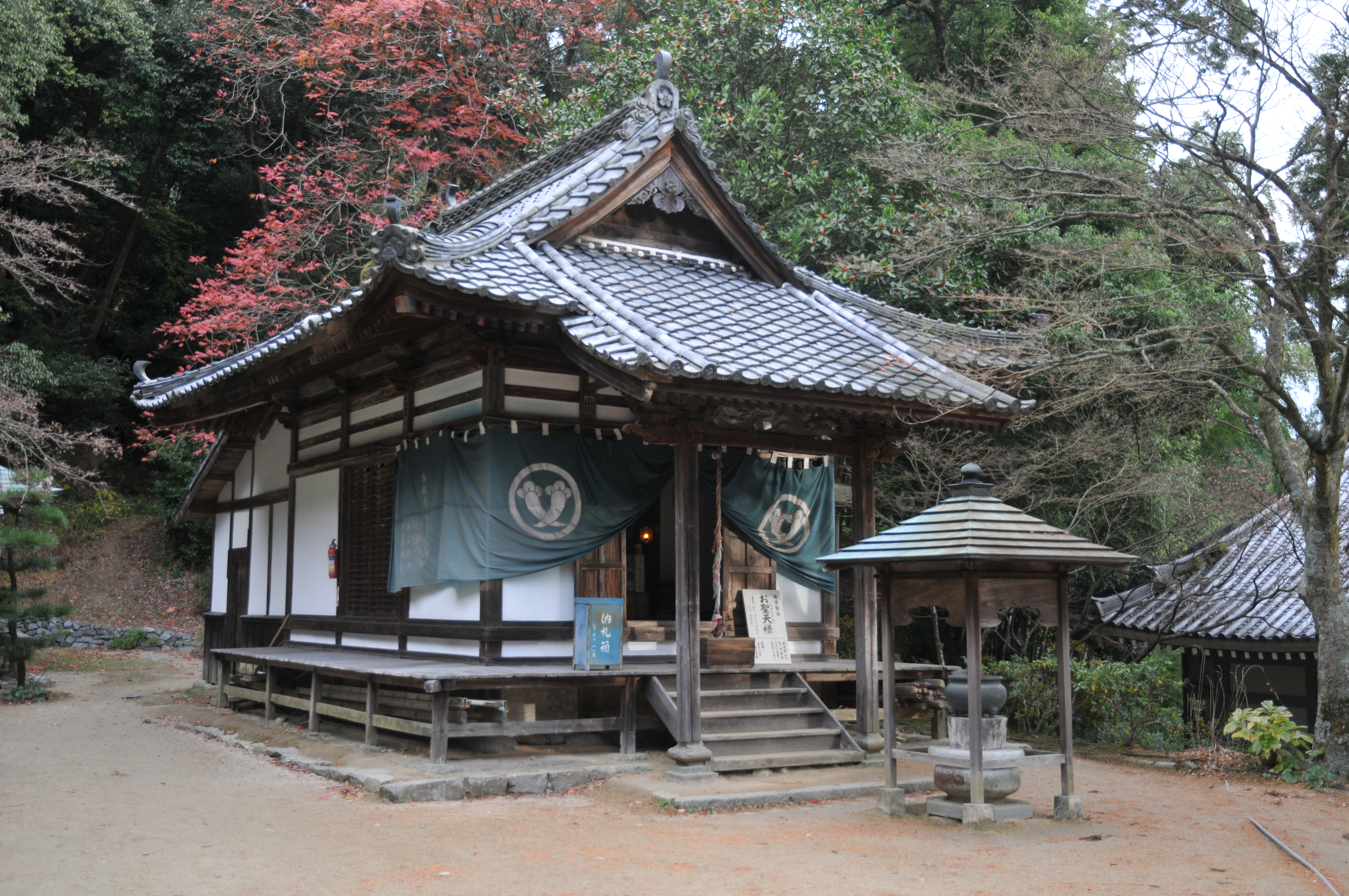
Nishiyama Kōryū-ji Temple

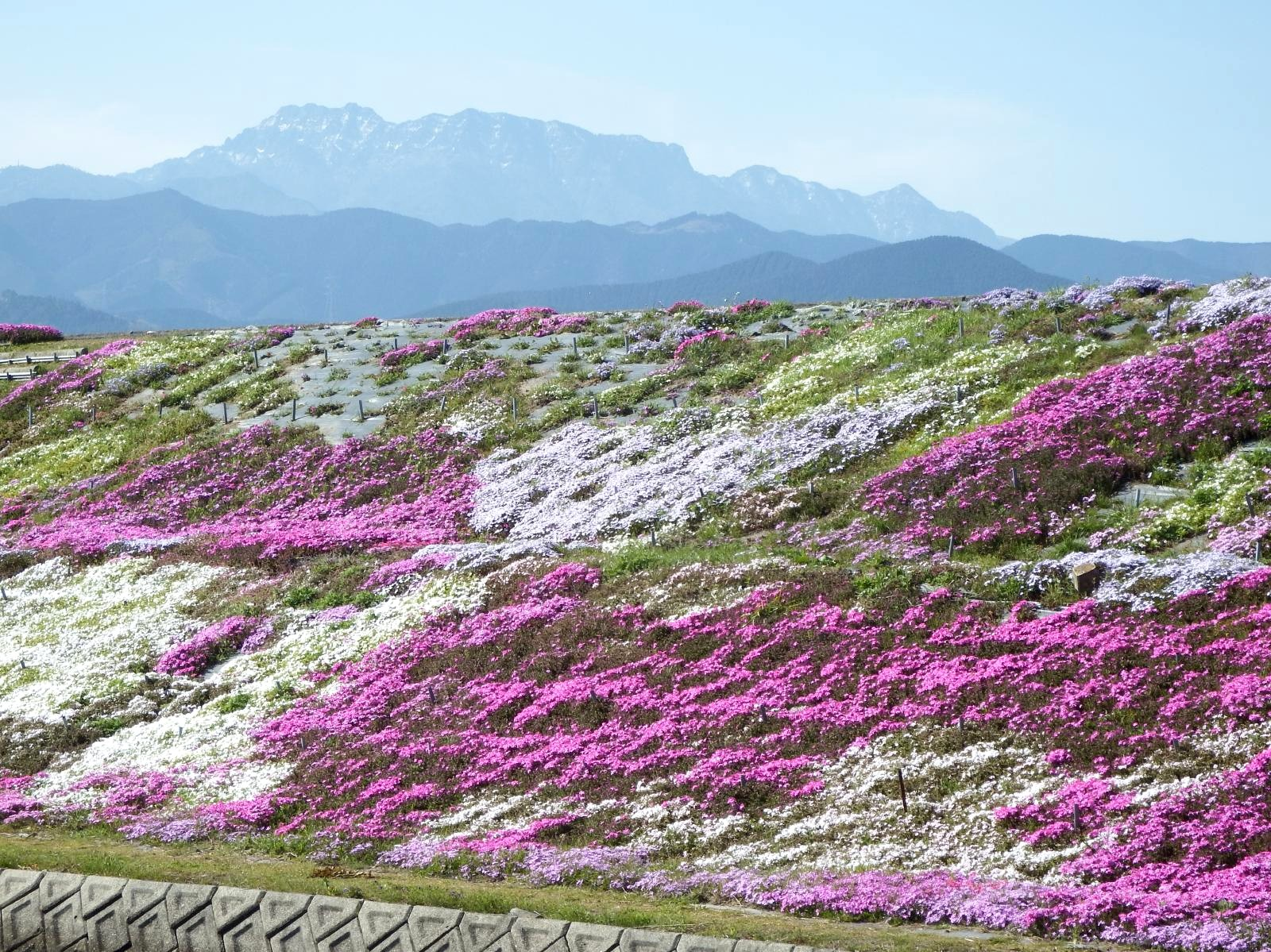
A view of phlox subulata in Teizui hill, a backyard in Mount Ishizuchi

–==Notable people from Saijō ==

- Kaori Manabe, television personality and model (born 1980)
- Yuto Nagatomo, football player (born 1986)
- Koichiro Nishi, actor (was born in Komatsu, Shūsō District, which is now part of Saijō City)
- Yukio Seki, leader of the "Shikishima-tai" squadron, one of the first kamikaze units (1921–1944)
- Shinji Sogō, credited with the creation of the Shinkansen, second mayor of Saijo (1884–1981)
- Nobutaka Taguchi, Gold medalist in the 100 m breaststroke at the 1972 Summer Olympics (born 1951 in Tōyo)
- Asashio Tarō II, Taisho era ōzeki (1879-1962)
- Jujiro Wada, adventurer, entrepreneur, and prospector (1872–1937)

== In popular culture ==
The Otani Pond, located in the city, was one of the settings for the 2022 anime film Suzume.
