= Shūsō District, Ehime =

Former district in Ehime prefecture, Japan

Shūsō (周桑郡, Shūsō-gun) was a district located in Ehime Prefecture, Japan.

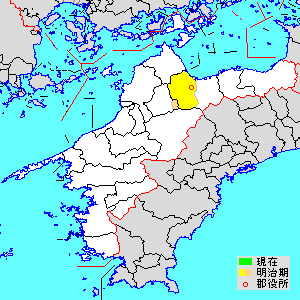
Map showing Shūsō district

== History ==
- April 1897 — Shūfu District and Kuwamura District were merged to become the Shūsō District. (17 villages)
- November 22, 1898 — The village of Komatsu was elevated to town status to become the town of Komatsu. (1 town, 16 villages)
- June 14, 1901 — The village of Nyūgawa was elevated to town status to become the town of Nyūgawa. (2 towns, 15 villages)
- December 13, 1913 — The village of Fukuoka was elevated to town status to become the town of Tanbara. (3 towns, 14 villages)
- October 1, 1940 — The village of Taga was merged into the town of Nyūgawa. (3 towns, 13 villages)
- August 10, 1951 — The village of Senzokuyama was renamed as the village of Ishizuchi.
- January 1, 1955 — The villages of Shūfu and Yoshii, the town of Nyūgawa, and the villages of Yoshioka and Kuniyasu were merged to create the town of Nyūgawa. (3 towns, 9 villages)
- January 1, 1955 — The villages of Miyoshi, Kusukawa and Shōnai were merged to create the town of Miyoshi. (4 towns, 6 villages)
- April 25, 1955 — The village of Ishizuchi, the town of Komatsu, and the village of Iwane were merged to create the town of Komatsu. (4 towns, 4 villages)
- April 25, 1955 — The village of Tokuda and the town of Tanbara were merged to create the town of Tanbara. (4 towns, 3 villages)
- July 20, 1955 — The villages of Nakagawa and Sakuragi were merged to create the village of Nakagawa. (4 towns, 2 villages)
- September 1, 1956 — The town of Tanbara and the villages of Tano and Nakagawa were merged to create the town of Tanbara. (4 towns, 1 village)
- September 1, 1956 — Parts of the village of Nakagawa was merged with the village of Kawauchi (from Onsen District) to create the town of Kawauchi (in Onsen District) (now the city of Tōon). (4 towns)
- January 1, 1971 — The towns of Nyūgawa and Miyoshi were merged to form the create of Tōyo. (3 towns)
- October 1, 1972 — The town of Tōyo was elevated to city status to become the city of Tōyo. (2 towns)
- November 1, 2004 — The towns of Komatsu and Tanbara, along with the city of Tōyo, were merged into the expanded city of Saijō. Shūsō District was dissolved as a result of this merger.

== See also ==
- List of dissolved districts of Japan
