= Komatsu, Ehime =

Dissolved municipality in Ehime prefecture, Japan

Komatsu (小松町, Komatsu-chō) was a town located in Shūsō District, Ehime Prefecture, Japan.

As of 2003, the town had an estimated population of 9,668 and a density of 126.78 persons per km^{2}. The total area was 76.26 km^{2}.

On November 1, 2004, Komatsu, along with the city of Tōyo, and the town of Tanbara (also from Shūsō District), was merged into the expanded city of Saijō and no longer exists as an independent municipality.
