= Tōyo, Ehime =

Dissolved municipality in Ehime prefecture, Japan

Tōyo (東予市, Tōyo-shi) was a city located in Ehime Prefecture, Japan. The Toyo-town was founded on January 1, 1971. The city of Toyo formed October 1, 1972.

As of 2003, the city had an estimated population of 32,652 and the density of 441.90 persons per km^{2}. The total area was 73.89 km^{2}.

On November 1, 2004, Tōyo, along with the towns of Komatsu and Tanbara (both from Shūsō District), was merged into the expanded city of Saijō and no longer exists as an independent municipality.
