= Shūfu District, Ehime =

Former district in Ehime prefecture, Japan

List of provinces of Japan > Nankaidō > Iyo Province > Shūfu District

Japan > Shikoku > Ehime Prefecture > Shūfu District

Shūfu (周敷郡（周布郡）, Shūfu-gun) was a district located in eastern Iyo Province (Ehime Prefecture). In 1897, the district merged with Kuwamura District (桑村郡) to become Shūsō District (周桑郡) and the district dissolved.

== Timeline ==
- 15 December 1889 – Due to the municipal status enforcement, 10 villages were formed.
  - Village of Yoshii (吉井村) ← Village of Ishida (石田村), Village of Imazaike (今在家村), Village of Hiroe (広江村), part of Village of Arashiki (新屋敷村), part of Village of Tamanoe (玉之江村)（Town of Nyugawa → City of Tōyo → City of Saijō）
  - Village of Shū (周布村) ← Village of Yoshida (吉田村), part of Village of Shū (周布村), part of Village of Mitsuya (三津屋村)（same as above）
  - Village of Taga (多賀村) ← Village of Hōjō (北条村), part of Village of Mitsuya (三津屋村), part of Village of Shū (周布村)（same as above）
  - Village of Komatsu (小松村) ← Village of Minamikawa (南川村), Village of Kitagawa (北川村), part of Village of Arashiki (新屋敷村), part of Village of Tamanoe (玉之江村)（Town of Komatsu → City of Saijō）
  - Village of Ishine (石根村) ← Village of Myōguchi (妙口村), Village of Ōkashira (大頭村), Village of Ōgo (大郷村), Village of Yasui (安井村), part of Village of Akaho (明穂村)（same as above）
  - Village of Senzokuyama (千足山村) ← Village of Senzokuyama (千足山村)（Village of Ishizuchi → Town of Komatsu → City of Saijō）
  - Village of Fukuoka (福岡村) ← Village of Kumyōji (久妙寺村), Village of Imai (今井村), Village of Tanbara (丹原村), Village of Ikeda (池田村), Village of Ganrenji (願蓮寺村)（Town of Tanbara → City of Saijō）
  - Village of Tano ← Village of Nagano (長野村), Village of Tano Kamigata (田野村上方), Village of Kitano (北田野村), Village of Takamatsu (高松村), Village of Kawane (川根村)（same as above）
  - Village of Nakagawa (中川村) ← Village of Yuyaguchi (湯屋口村), Village of Shigawa (志川村), Village of Terao (寺尾村), Village of Konomi (来見村), Village of Ishikyo (石経村), Village of Sekiya (関屋村), part of Village of Akaho (明穂村)（same as above）
  - Village of Ōju (桜樹村) ← Village of Kusukubo (楠窪村), Village of Namekawa (滑川村), Village of Akarakawa (明河村), Village of Kurase (鞍瀬村), Village of Chihara (千原村), Village of Ususaka (臼坂村)（Village of Nakagawa → Town of Tanbara → City of Saijō, Villages of Namekawa and Akarakawa → Village of Nakagawa → Town of Kawauchi → City of Tōon）
- 1 April 1897 – Merged with Kuwamura District to become Shūsō District.
