= Nyūgawa, Ehime =

Nyūgawa 壬生川町
- Town
- Interactive map of Nyūgawa
- Country: Japan
- Prefecture: Ehime Prefecture
- District: Shūsō District
- Region: Tōyo Region
- Time zone: UTC+9:00 (JST)
- ISO 3166 code: JP-38

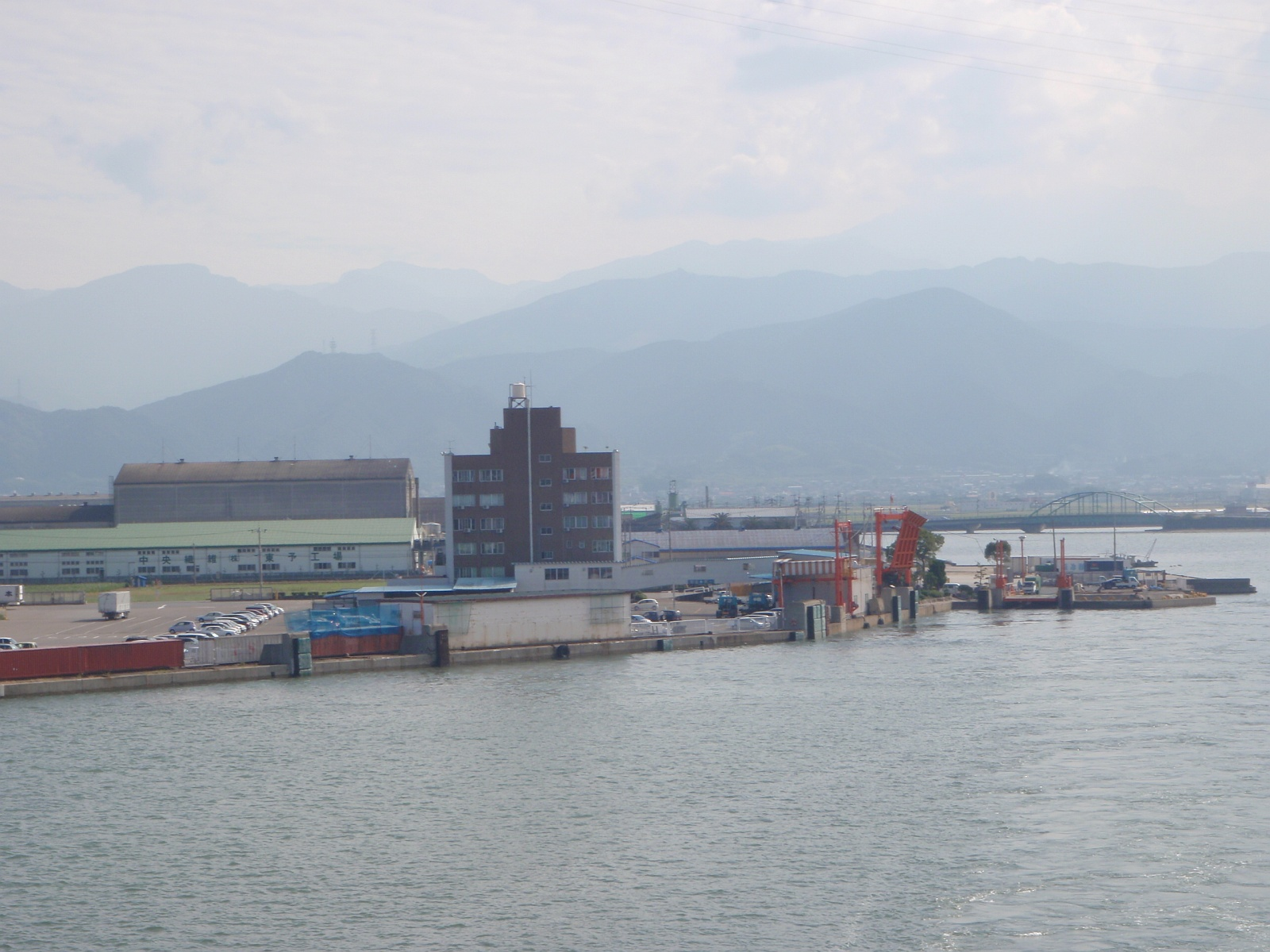
Toyo port in Nyūgawa

Nyūgawa (壬生川町, Nyūgawa-cho) was a town located in Shūsō District, Tōyo Region in Ehime Prefecture.
