= Kanbe Domain =

Kanbe Domain 神戸藩
- under Tokugawa shogunate Japan
- 1601–1871
- Capital: Kanbe Castle
- Area
  - Coordinates: 34°52′44.75″N 136°34′38.73″E
  - Type: Daimyō
- Historical era: Edo period
  - Established: 1601
  - Disestablished: 1871
- Today part of: part of Mie Prefecture

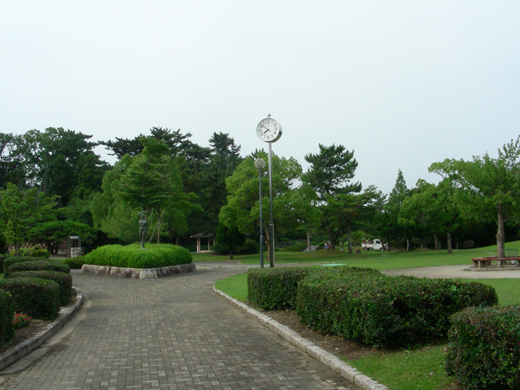
Kanbe Park, on the site of Kanbe Castle

Kanbe Domain (神戸藩, Kanbe-han) was a feudal domain under the Tokugawa shogunate of Edo period Japan, located in Ise Province in what is part of now modern-day Suzuka, Mie. It was centered around Kanbe Castle. Kanbe Domain was controlled by fudai daimyō clans throughout most its history.

== History ==
Under Toyotomi Hideyoshi, Kanbe Castle was held by Takigawa Katsutoshi as part of a 20,000 koku domain. However, as he sided with the Western Army in the Battle of Sekigahara, he was dispossessed by the victorious Tokugawa Ieyasu in 1600. Ichiyanagi Naomori was established as daimyō of the newly created 50,000 koku Kanbe Domain under the Tokugawa shogunate in 1601. In 1636, Ichiyagani Naomori was awarded with a further increase in kokudaka and was transferred to Saijō Domain in Iyo Province and Kanbe reverted to tenryō status. During this time, much of Kanbe Castle was destroyed. The domain was revived in 1651 for Ichikawa Fusanaga, the younger son of the daimyō of Zeze Domain, who had been allowed to form a 10,000 koku cadet branch of the Ichikawa clan. He was awarded a further 10,000 koku for his services in the shogunal administration, and in 1736 his grandson was transferred to Shimodate Domain in Hitachi Province.

The Ishikawa were replaced by a cadet branch of the Honda clan from Kawachi Province, initially with 10,000 koku, and with an additional 5,000 koku added in 1745. The Honda clan would continue to rule Kanbe until the Meiji restoration. In 1748, Honda Tadamune, who served in the shogunal administration as a wakadoshiyori was allowed to rebuild Kanbe Castle. He was also a noted scholar, disciple of Ogyū Sorai, and master of the Japanese tea ceremony. He established the domain academy "Sankyodo" at Kanbe Castle, as a branch school called the "Narukusakan" in the clan's Edo residence. The fifth daimyō, Honda Tadataka, was also a Neo-Confucianist and changed the orientation of the academy to follow the Cheng–Zhu school, renaming the academy "Kōrindō" at Kanbe and "Shintokudō" in Edo in 1813. The 1854 Tōkai earthquake caused great damage during the tenure of Honda Tadahiro. During the Boshin War, the domain quickly submitted to the imperial side under its final daimyō, Honda Tadatsura.

== Holdings at the end of the Edo period ==
As with most domains in the han system, Kanbe Domain consisted of several discontinuous territories calculated to provide the assigned kokudaka, based on periodic cadastral surveys and projected agricultural yields.

- Ise Province
  - 1 village in Mie District
  - 14 villages in Kawawa District
  - 4 villages in Suzuka District
- Kawachi Province
  - 11 villages in Nishigori District

== List of daimyō ==
#	Name	Tenure	Courtesy title	Court Rank	kokudaka
Hitotsuyanagi clan, 1601-1636 (tozama)
1	Hitotsuyanagi Naomori (一柳直盛)	1601–1636	Kenmotsu (監物)	Junior 5th Rank, Lower Grade (従五位下)	50,000 koku
tenryō 1636–1651
Ichikawa clan, 1651-1732 (fudai)
1	Ichikawa Fusanaga (石川総長)	1651–1661	Harima-no-kami (播磨守)	Junior 5th Rank, Lower Grade (従五位下)	10,000 -> 20,000 koku
2	Ichikawa Fusayoshi (石川総良)	1661–1685	Wakasa-no-kami (若狭守)	Junior 5th Rank, Lower Grade (従五位下)	20,000 koku
3	Ichikawa Fusashige (石川総茂)	1685–1732	Omi-no-kami (近江守)	Junior 5th Rank, Lower Grade (従五位下)	20,000 -> 17,000 koku
Honda clan, 1702-1871 (fudai)
1	Honda Tadamune (本多忠統)	1732–1750	Iyo-no-kami (伊予守)	Junior 5th Rank, Lower Grade (従五位下)	10,000 ->15,000 koku
2	Honda Tadanada (本多忠永)	1750–1760	Tango-no-kami (丹後守)	Junior 5th Rank, Lower Grade (従五位下)	15,000 koku
3	Honda Tadaoki (本多忠興)	1760–1766	Tango-no-kami (丹後守)	Junior 5th Rank, Lower Grade (従五位下)	15,000 koku
4	Honda Tadahiro (本多忠奝)	1766–1803	Iyo-no-kami (伊予守)	Junior 5th Rank, Lower Grade (従五位下)	15,000 koku
5	Honda Tadataka (本多忠升)	1803–1840	Tango-no-kami (丹後守)	Junior 5th Rank, Lower Grade (従五位下)	15,000 koku
6	Honda Tadahiro (本多忠寛)	1841–1857	Iyo-no-kami (伊予守)	Junior 5th Rank, Lower Grade (従五位下)	15,000 koku
6	Honda Tadatsura (本多忠貫)	1857–1871	Iyo-no-kami 伊予守)	Junior 5th Rank, Lower Grade (従五位下)	15,000 koku

== See also ==
- List of Han
- Abolition of the han system
