= Tanbara, Ehime =

Dissolved municipality in Ehime prefecture, Japan

Tanbara (丹原町, Tanbara-chō) was a town located in Shūsō District, Ehime Prefecture, Japan.

As of 2003, the town had an estimated population of 13,354 and a density of 103.44 persons per km^{2}. The total area was 129.10 km^{2}.

On November 1, 2004, Tanbara, along with the city of Tōyo, and the town of Komatsu (also from Shūsō District), was merged into the expanded city of Saijō and no longer exists as an independent municipality.
