= Iyo-Matsuyama Domain =

Administrative division in Japan during the Edo period (1608–1871)

Iyo-Matsuyama Domain 伊予松山藩
- Domain of Japan
- 1608–1871
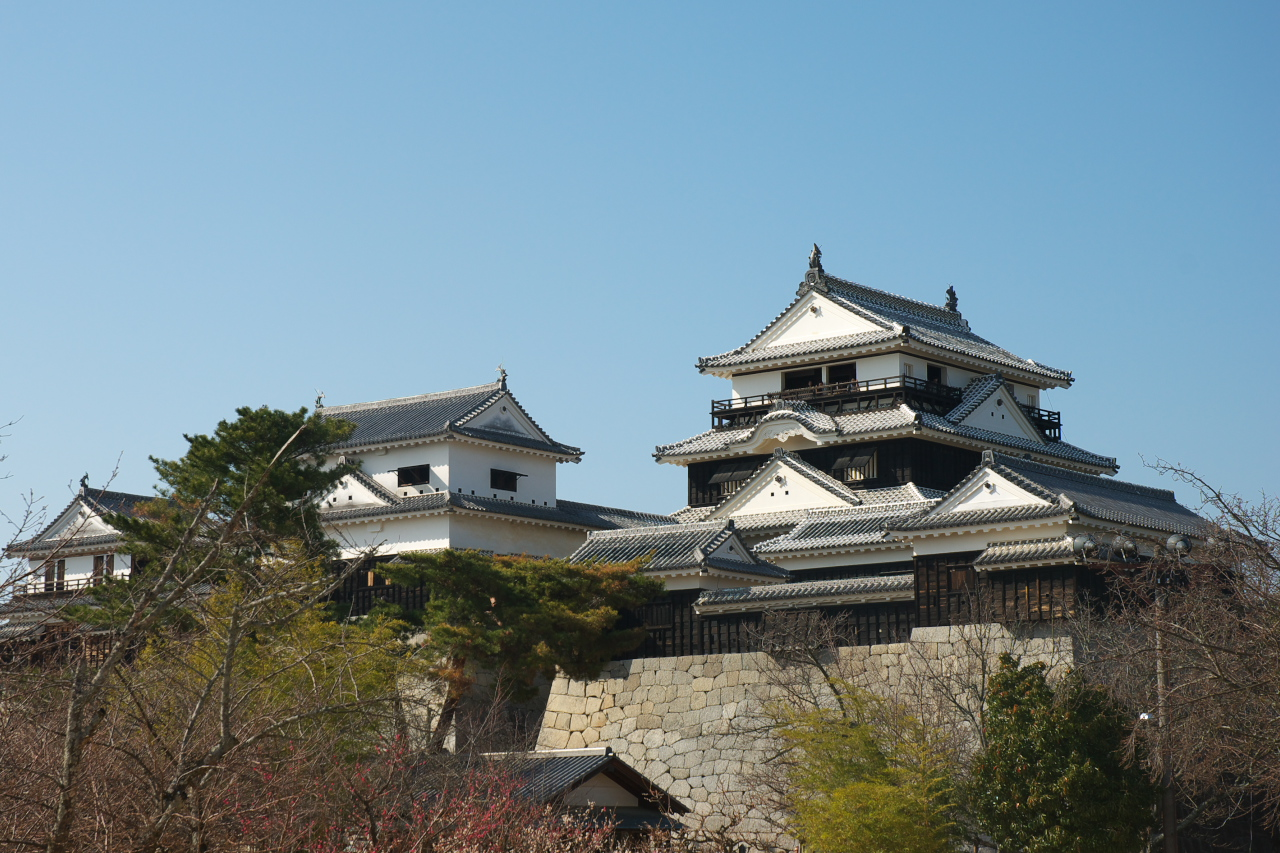
- Matsuyama Castle in Matsuyama, Ehime

- Mon of the Hisamatsu-Matsudaira clan
- Capital: Matsuyama Castle
- Area
  - Coordinates: 33°50′43.94″N 132°45′56.6″E
- Historical era: Edo period
  - Established: 1608
  - Abolition of the han system: 1871
- Contained within
  - Province: Iyo
- Today part of: Ehime Prefecture

Location of Matsuyama Castle
Iyo-Matsuyama Domain (Japan)

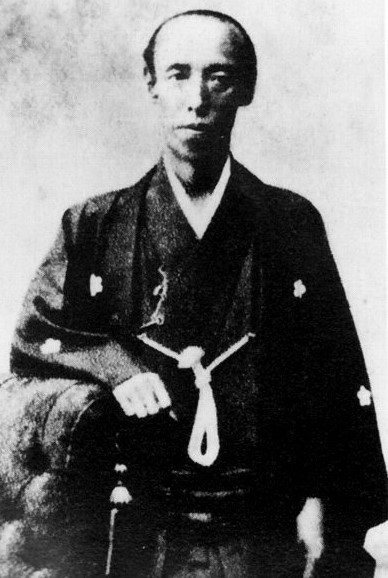
Matsudaira Katsushige, 13th daimyō of Iyo-Matsuyama Domain

Iyo-Matsuyama Domain (伊予松山藩, Iyo-Matsuyama-han) was a feudal domain under the Tokugawa shogunate of Edo period Japan, in what is now central Ehime Prefecture on the island of Shikoku. It was centered around Matsuyama Castle, and was ruled throughout most of its history by the shinpan daimyō Hisamatsu-Matsudaira clan. Iyo-Matsuyama Domain was dissolved in the abolition of the han system in 1871 and is now part of Ehime Prefecture.

== History ==
Katō Yoshiaki was one of Toyotomi Hideyoshi's most trusted and experienced generals, having distinguished himself at the Battle of Shizugatake in 1583 and in the Japanese invasions of Korea, After Hideyoshi's death in 1598, Katō sided with Tokugawa Ieyasu at the Battle of Sekigahara in 1600, and his 60,000 koku holdings in Masaki in Iyo Province were expanded to 200,000 koku. He relocated his seat to Matsuyama Castle and this marked the beginning of Iyo-Matsuyama Domain. In 1627, he was transferred to Aizu Domain, and replaced by Gamō Tadatomo from Kaminoyama Domain in Dewa Province, who died without heir in 1634.

The Tokugawa shogunate then assigned Matsudaira Sadayuki from Kuwana Domain to govern the territory, which was reduced in size to 150,000 koku. His branch of the Matsudaira clan would govern Iyo-Matsuyama Domain to the Meiji restoration. Although prosperous in its early years, the domain was hard hit by famine caused by droughts and floods during the Kanbun and Enpo eras (1661–1680), and financial difficulties continued thereafter. In particular, the Kyōhō famine of 1732 was especially severe and the 5th daimyō. Matsudaira Sadahide was severely criticized by this shogunate for mismanagement when it was revealed that although 3500 commoners had died of starvation, his samurai continued to enjoy lives of dissipation. Despite constant financial issues, the tenshu of Matsuyama Castle was rebuilt in 1854 by the 12th daimyō, Matsudaira Katsuyoshi, although it had been destroyed by lightning seventy years previously in 1784. In 1859, Matsudaira Katsunari, the 13th daimyō, was ordered by the shogunate to construct coastal artillery batteries at Kanagawa in Musashi Province in response to the Perry Expedition. During the Bakumatsu period, the domain was strongly pro-shogunate, and was in the vanguard of the 1864 First Chōshū expedition. During that battle, Matsuyama troops looted and massacred the inhabitants of Suō-Ōshima island, which set the seeds for a strong enmity between Chōshū Domain and Matsuyama. The 14th daimyō, Matsudaira Sadaaki was appointed rōjū in 1867. During the Boshin War, he guarded the Umeda area of Osaka, but on hearing that Shogun Tokugawa Yoshinobu had abandoned his forces during the Battle of Toba-Fushimi, returned to Matsuyama. The domain surrendered to the imperial side under the conditions that it pay a 150,000 ryō fine to the Imperial Court and that Matsudaira Sadaaki resign and be placed under house arrest through the intercession of Tosa Domain, who was wary of Chōshū's increasing influence and belligerence. Afterwards, the Meiji government ordered Sadaaki to change his family name from 'Matsudaira' to 'Hisamatsu.' In 1871, the domain became "Matsuyama Prefecture" due to the abolition of the han system. Later, it was incorporated into Ehime Prefecture via "Sekitetsu Prefecture".

In 1887, the family was granted the title of count (hakushaku) under the kazoku peerage system. The clan's Takayashiki residence in Edo was the location where Horibe Yasubei and 11 other of the Forty-seven rōnin of the Ako incident committed seppuku in 1703. After the Meiji restoration, the estate was sold to Matsukata Masayoshi and subsequently became the site of the Italian embassy in Tokyo.

== Holdings at the end of the Edo period ==
As with most domains in the han system, Matsuyama Domain consisted of several discontinuous territories calculated to provide the assigned kokudaka, based on periodic cadastral surveys and projected agricultural yields.

- Iyo Province
  - 29 villages in Noma District (entire district)
  - 25 villages in Wake District (entire district)
  - 36 villages in Onsen District (entire district)
  - 32 villages in Kume District (entire district)
  - 26 villages in Shūfu District
  - 25 villages in Kuwamura District
  - 17 villages in Ochi District
  - 77 villages in Kazahaya District
  - 47 villages in Ukena District
  - 22 villages in Iyo District

== List of daimyō ==
#	Name	Tenure	Courtesy title	Court Rank	kokudaka
Katō clan, 1600–1627 (Tozama)
1	Katō Yoshiaki (加藤嘉明)	1600–1627	Sama-no-suke (左馬助); Jijū (侍従)	Junior 4th Rank, Lower Grade (従四位下)	200,000 koku
Gamō clan, 1614–1634 (Tozama)
1	Gamō Tadatomo (蒲生忠知)	1627–1634	Nakatsukasa-no-taifu (中務大輔); Jijū (侍従)	Senior 4th Rank, Lower Grade (正四位下)	240,000 koku
Hisamatsu-Matsudaira clan, 1635–1871 (Shinpan)
1	Matsudaira Sadayuki (松平定行)	1635–1658	Oki-no-kami (隠岐守); Jijū (侍従)	Junior 4th Rank, Lower Grade ( 従四位下)	150,000 koku
2	Matsudaira Tadanori (松平定頼)	1658–1662	Oki-no-kami (隠岐守)	Junior 4th Rank, Lower Grade ( 従四位下)	150,000 koku
3	Matsudaira Sadanaga (松平定長)	1662–1674	Oki-no-kami (隠岐守); Jijū (侍従)	Junior 4th Rank, Lower Grade ( 従四位下)	150,000 koku
4	Matsudaira Sadanao (松平定直)	1674–1720	Oki-no-kami (隠岐守); Jijū (侍従)	Junior 4th Rank, Lower Grade ( 従四位下)	150,000 koku
5	Matsudaira Sadahide (松平定英)	1720–1733	Oki-no-kami (隠岐守)	Junior 4th Rank, Lower Grade ( 従四位下)	150,000 koku
6	Matsudaira Sadataka (松平定喬)	1733–1763	Oki-no-kami (隠岐守); Jijū (侍従)	Junior 4th Rank, Lower Grade ( 従四位下)	150,000 koku
7	Matsudaira Sadakatsu (松平定功)	1763–1765	Oki-no-kami (隠岐守)	Junior 5th Rank, Lower Grade ( 従五位下)	150,000 koku
8	Matsudaira Sadakiyo (松平定静)	1765–1777	Oki-no-kami (隠岐守); Jijū (侍従)	Junior 4th Rank, Lower Grade ( 従四位下)	150,000 koku
9	Matsudaira Sadakuni (松平定国)	1777–1804	Oki-no-kami (隠岐守); Jijū (侍従), Sankon'e-no-shosho (左近衛権少将)	Junior 4th Rank, Lower Grade ( 従四位下)	150,000 koku
10	Matsudaira Sadanori (松平定則)	1804–1809	-none-	-none -	150,000 koku
11	Matsudaira Sadamichi (松平定通)	1809–1835	Oki-no-kami (隠岐守); Jijū (侍従)	Junior 4th Rank, Lower Grade ( 従四位下)	150,000 koku
12	Matsudaira Katsuyoshi (松平勝善)	1835–1856	Oki-no-kami (隠岐守); Jijū (侍従), Sankon'e-no-shosho (左近衛権少将)	Junior 4th Rank, Lower Grade ( 従四位下)	150,000 koku
13	Matsudaira Katsushige (松平勝成)	1856–1867	Oki-no-kami (隠岐守); Jijū (侍従), Sankon'e-no-shosho (左近衛権少将)	Junior 4th Rank, Lower Grade ( 従四位下)	150,000 koku
14	Matsudaira Sadaaki (松平定昭)	1867–1868	Iyo-no-kami (伊予守); Jijū (侍従), Sankon'e-no-shosho (左近衛権少将)	Junior 4th Rank, Lower Grade ( 従四位下)	150,000 koku
13	Hisamatsu Katsushige (久松勝成)	1868–1871	Oki-no-kami (隠岐守); Jijū (侍従), Sankon'e-no-shosho (左近衛権少将)	Senior 4th Rank, Lower Grade ( 正四位)	150,000 koku
14	Hisamatsu Sadaaki (久松定昭)	1871–1871	-none-	Senior 5th Rank ( 従五位)	150,000 koku

=== Simplified family tree (Matsudaira) ===
- Mizuno Tadamasa, Lord of Kariya (1493–1543). He had issue, including:
  - Mizuno Nobumoto (died 1576)
    - (likely) Doi Toshikatsu, Lord of Koga (1573–1644)
      - A daughter, m. Hori Naotsugu, Lord of Murakami (1614–1638)
        - A daughter, m. Hori Naoyoshi, Lord of Muramatsu (1637–1676)
          - Hori Naotoshi, 3rd Lord of Muramatsu (1658–1716)
            - Hori Naohide, 5th Lord of Susaka (1700–1767)
              - Ho-umyōin, m. Tachibana Nagahiro, 5th Lord of Miike (1720–1778)
                - Tachibana Tanechika, 6th Lord of Miike (1744–1809)
                  - A daughter (1782–1807), m. Ikeda Naganori (born 1783)
                    - A daughter, m. Matsudaira Katsumi
                      - Lieutenant-General Hisamatsu Sadakoto, 17th family head, 1st Count (1867–1943; 17th family head: 1872–1943; Count: c. 1884)
                        - Hisamatsu Sadatake, 18th family head, 2nd Count (1899–1995; 18th family head: 1943–95; 2nd Count: 1943–47)
                          - Hisamatsu Sadanaru, 19th family head (born 1926; 19th family head: 1995-present)
                            - Hisamatsu Sadasato (born 1979)
  - A daughter (died 1597), m. Matsudaira Iehiro (died 1571)
    - A daughter, m. Torii Mototada, Lord of Yasaku (1539–1600)
      - Torii Naritsugu, Lord of Tanimura (1570–1631)
        - A daughter, m. Inoue Masatoshi, 1st Lord of Kasama (1606–1675)
          - Inoue Masatō, 2nd Lord of Kasama (1630–1701)
            - Inoue Teishōin, m. Matsudaira Nobuteru, 1st Lord of Koga (1660–1725)
              - Matsudaira Nobutoki, 1st Lord of Hamamatsu (1683–1744)
                - Matsudaira Nobunao, 1st Lord of Yoshida (1719–1768)
                  - Matsudaira Nobuuya, 2nd Lord of Yoshida (1737–1770)
                    - Matsudaira Kikaku (1767–1789), m. Nagai Naonobu, 9th Lord of Takatsuki (1761–1815)
                      - Nagai Yasuko (died 1812), m. Tōdō Takasawa, 10th Lord of Tsu (1781–1825)
                        - Tōdō Takayuki, 11th Lord of Tsu (1813–1895)
                          - XIV. Matsudaira (Tōdō) Sadaaki, 14th Lord of Iyo-Matsuyama (1845–1872; r. 1867–68; 14th & 16th family head: 1867–68 & 1871–72)
  - O-dainokata (1528–1602). She married twice and had issue, including:
    - Tokugawa Ieyasu, 1st Tokugawa Shōgun (1543–1616; r. 1603–05) (by O-dainokata's first husband Matsudaira Hirotada (1526–1549))
      - Tokugawa Yorinobu, 1st Lord of Kishū (1602–1671)
        - Tokugawa Mitsutada, 2nd Lord of Kishū (1627–1705)
          - Tokugawa Yoshimune, 5th Lord of Kishū, 8th Tokugawa Shōgun (1684–1751; Lord of Kishū: 1705–16; Shōgun: 1716–45)
            - Tokugawa Munetake, 1st Tayasu-Tokugawa family head (1716–1771)
              - IX. Matsudaira Sadakuni, 9th Lord of Iyo-Matsuyama (1757–1804; r. 1779–1804)
                - X. Sadanori, 10th Lord of Iyo-Matsuyama (1793–1809; r. 1804–09)
                - XI. Sadamichi, 11th Lord of Iyo-Matsuyama (1804–1835; r. 1809–35)
      - Tokugawa Yorifusa, 1st Lord of Mito (1603–1661)
        - Matsudaira Yorishige, 1st Lord of Takamatsu (1622–1695)
          - Matsudaira Yoritoshi (1661–1687)
            - Matsudaira Yoritoyo, 3rd Lord of Takamatsu (1680–1735)
              - Tokugawa Munetaka, 4th Lord of Mito (1705–1730)
                - Tokugawa Munemoto, 5th Lord of Mito (1728–1766)
                  - Tokugawa Harumori, 6th Lord of Mito (1751–1805)
                    - Tokugawa Harutoshi, 7th Lord of Mito (1773–1816)
                      - Matsudaira Yorihiro, 9th Lord of Takamatsu (1798–1842)
                        - XIII and XV. Katsushige, 13th & 15th Lord of Iyo-Matsuyama (1832–1912; Lord: 1856–67 & 1868–69; Governor: 1871; 15th family head: 1868–71)
    - Hisamatsu Sadakatsu, Lord of Kuwana (1560–1624) (by O-dainokata's second husband Hisamatsu Toshikatsu (1526–1587))
      - I. Matsudaira Sadayuki, 1st Lord of Iyo-Matsuyama (1587–1668; r. 1635–68)
        - II. Sadayori, 2nd Lord of Iyo-Matsuyama (1607–1662; r. 1658–62)
          - III. Sadanaga, 3rd Lord of Iyo-Matsuyama (1640–1674; r. 1662–74)
          - A daughter, m. Shimazu Tsunahisa (1632–1673)
            - Shimazu Tsunataka, 3rd Lord of Satsuma (1650–1704)
              - Shimazu Yoshitaka, 4th Lord of Satsuma (1675–1747)
                - Shimazu Tsugutoyo, 5th Lord of Satsuma (1702–1760)
                  - Shimazu Shigetoshi, 7th Lord of Satsuma (1729–1755)
                    - Shimazu Shigehide, 8th Lord of Satsuma (1745–1833)
                      - Shimazu Narinobu, 9th Lord of Satsuma (1774–1841)
                        - Shimazu Narioki, 10th Lord of Satsuma (1791–1858)
                          - Shimazu Hisamitsu (1817–1887)
                            - Shimazu Tadayoshi, 12th Lord of Satsuma (1840–1897)
                              - Sadako (1878–1974), m. Lieutenant-General Hisamatsu Sadakoto, 17th family head, 1st Count – see above
                        - XII. Matsudaira Katsuyoshi, 12th Lord of Iyo-Matsuyama (1817–1856; r. 1835–56)
                          - Sadakyō-in Kunihime (1843–1904), m. XIV. Matsudaira (Tōdō) Sadaaki, 14th Lord of Iyo-Matsuyama – see above
      - Sadafusa, 1st Lord of Imabari (1604–1676)
        - Sadatoki, 2nd Lord of Imabari (1635–1676)
          - IV. Sadanao, 4th Lord of Iyo-Matsuyama (1660–1720; r. 1674–1720)
            - V. Sadahide, 5th Lord of Iyo-Matsuyama (1696–1733; r. 1720–33)
              - VI. Sadataka, 6th Lord of Iyo-Matsuyama (1716–1763; r. 1733–63)
              - VII. Sadakatsu, 7th Lord of Iyo-Matsuyama (1733–1765; r. 1763–65)
            - Sadaakira, 1st Lord of Matsuyama-Shinden (1700–1747)
              - VIII. Sadakiyo, 8th Lord of Iyo-Matsuyama (1729–1779; r. 1765–79)

== See also ==
- List of Han
- Abolition of the han system
