= Niiya Domain =

Administrative division in Japan during the Edo period

Niiya Domain 新谷藩
- Domain of Japan
- 1623–1871
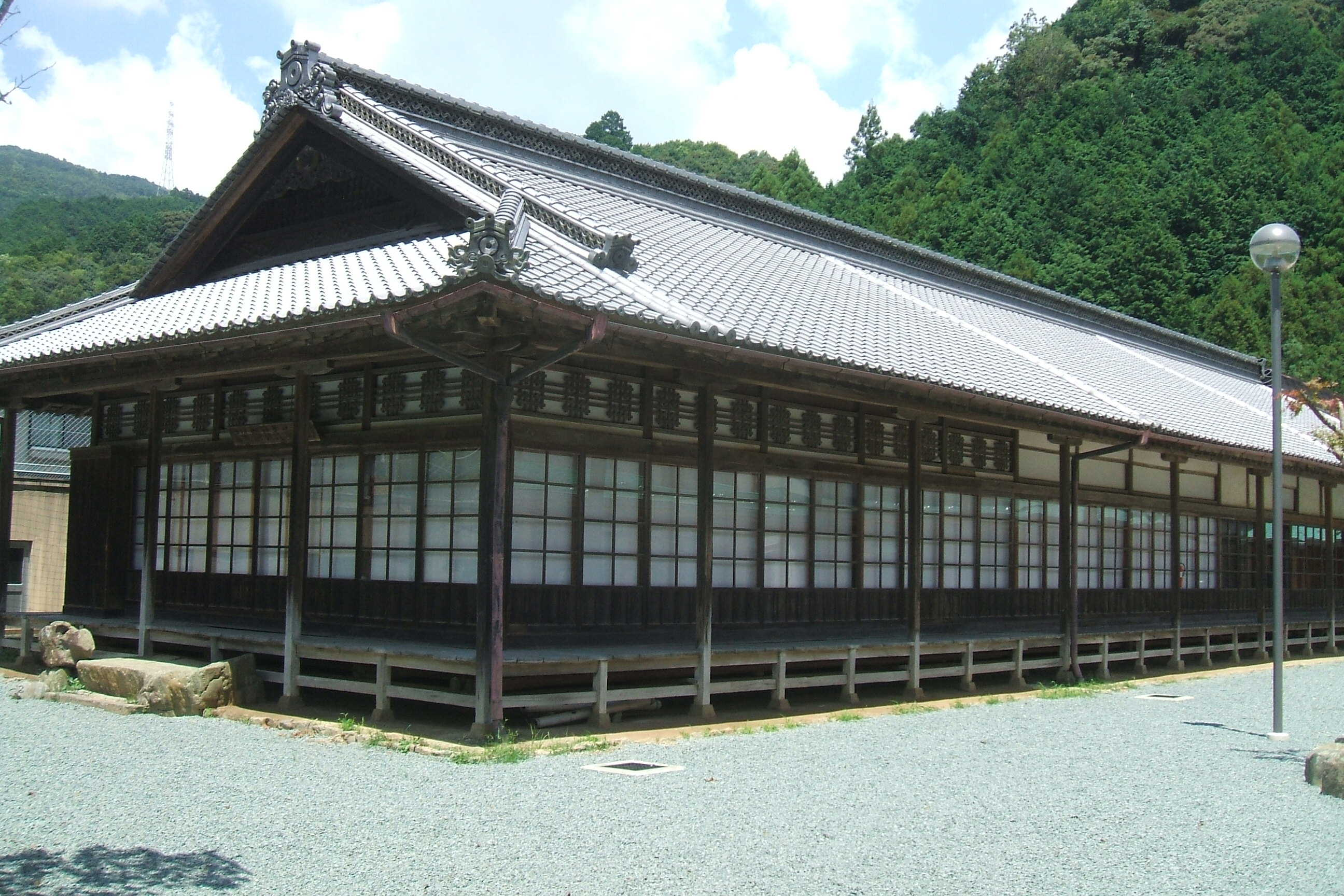
- Rinfukaku of Niiya Jinya

- Mon of the Katō clan
- Capital: Niiya jin'ya
- Area
  - Coordinates: 33°32′21.0″N 132°35′52.9″E
- Historical era: Edo period
  - Established: 1623
  - Abolition of the han system: 1871
- Contained within
  - Province: Iyo
- Today part of: Ehime Prefecture

Location of Ōzu Castle
Niiya Domain (Japan)

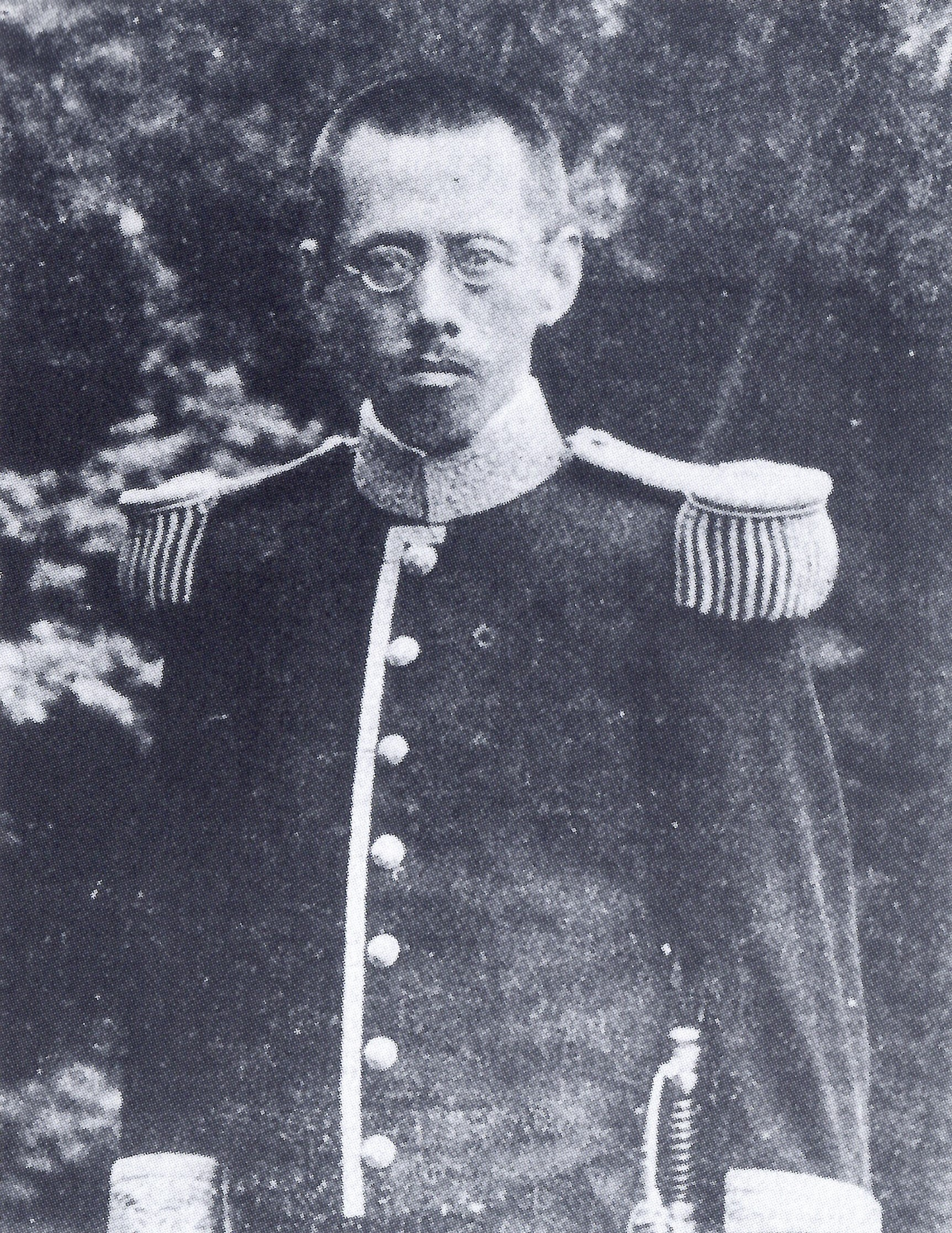
Katō Yasunori, final daimyō of Niiya Domain

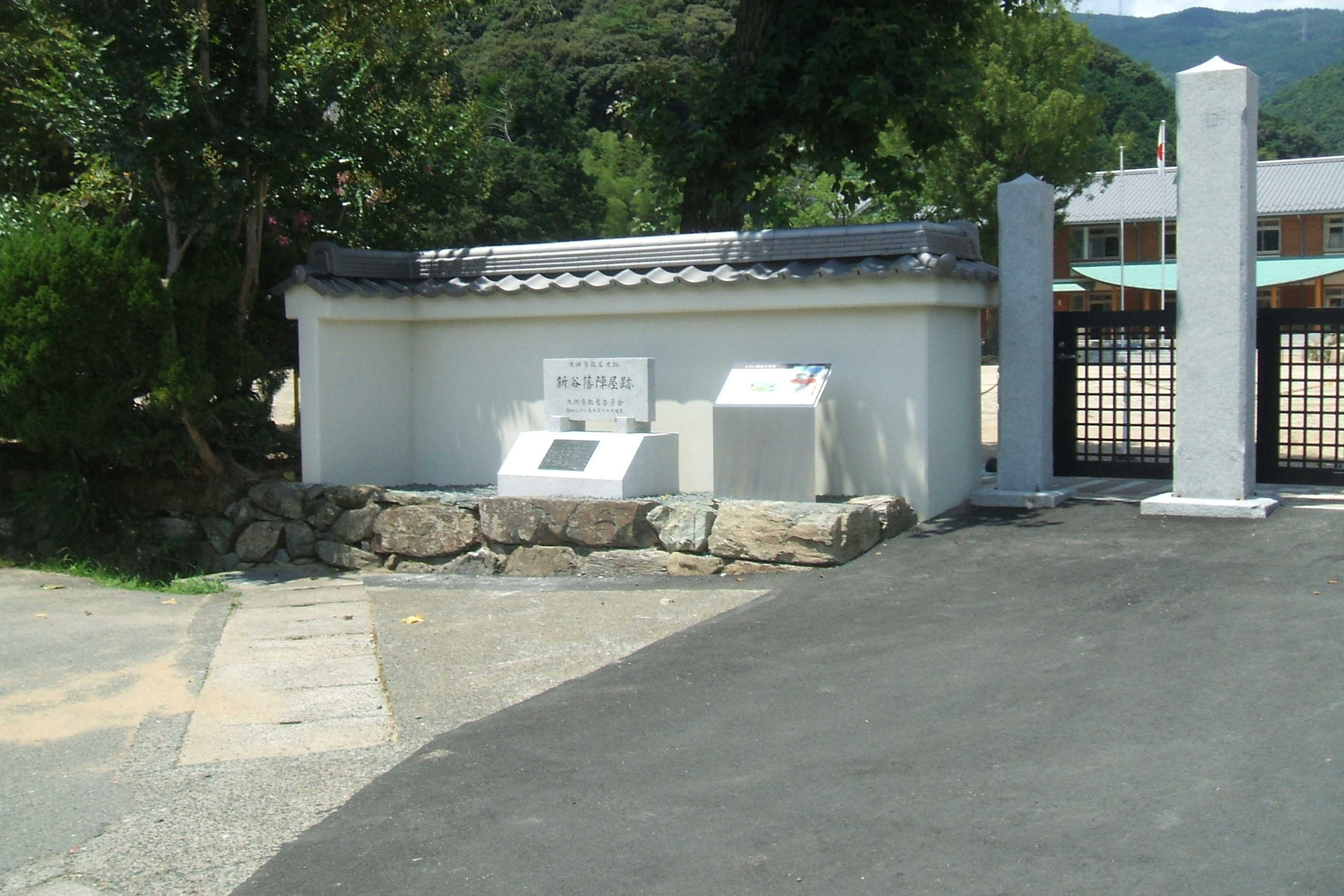
Entrance to the Niiya jin'ya

Niiya Domain (新谷藩, Niiya-han) was a feudal domain under the Tokugawa shogunate of Edo period Japan, in what is now western Ehime Prefecture on the island of Shikoku. It was centered around Niiya jin'ya in what is now part of the city of Ōzu, Ehime, and was ruled throughout its history by a cadet branch of tozama daimyō Katō clan. Niiya Domain was dissolved in the abolition of the han system in 1871 and is now part of Ehime Prefecture.

== History ==
In 1617, Ōzu Domain was assigned to Katō Sadayasu from Yonago Domain, with a kokudaka to 66,000 koku. Sadayasu died suddenly in 1623 without formally having appointed a successor, which would normally be cause for attainder; however, his eldest son Katō Yasuaki managed to secure an audience with Shogun Tokugawa Hidetada and was accepted as heir. However, the shogunate also "informally" recognized his younger brother, Katō Naoyasu, as daimyō of his own 10,000 koku estate and to establish Niiya Domain and a cadet branch of the Katō clan. This move was made without the prior knowledge of Katō Yasuaki and was thus vehemently opposed by Ōzu Domain, and relations between the two branches of the clan was hostile for the next two centuries. Niiya Domain was left in the ambitious position of both being a subsidiary domain of Ōzu and a direct domain under the shogunate. The jin'ya was completed in 1642. The history of the domain was relatively uneventful. The noted Confucian scholar Nakae Tōju spent part of his early career in Niiya. In the latter half of the Edo period, the domain's finances were in serious trouble due to flooding and fires caused by the flooding of the Hiji River. During the Boshin War, the domain fielded a company of commoner riflemen in the pro-imperial army, but otherwise played no role. With the 1871 abolition of the han system Ōzu Domain became "Ōzu Prefecture" and merged with "Uwajima Prefecture" before becoming part of Ehime Prefecture. The Kato clan was awarded the title of viscount user the kazoku peerage system in 1884.

A building of former jin'ya of the domain survives, and is designated a Ehime Prefectural Tangible Cultural Property. It is located within the grounds of the Ozu Municipal Niiya Elementary School.

== Holdings at the end of the Edo period ==
As with most domains in the han system, Niiya Domain consisted of several discontinuous territories calculated to provide the assigned kokudaka, based on periodic cadastral surveys and projected agricultural yields.

- Iyo Province
  - 8 villages in Ukena District
  - 3 villages in Iyo District
  - 3 villages in Kita District

== List of daimyō ==
#	Name	Tenure	Courtesy title	Court Rank	kokudaka
Katō clan, 1623–1871 (Tozama)
1	Katō Naoyasu (加藤直泰)	1623–1682	Oribe-no-kami (織部正)	Junior 5th Rank, Lower Grade (従五位下)	10,000 koku
2	Katō Yasukado (加藤泰觚)	1682–1716	Izumo-no-kami (出雲守)	Junior 5th Rank, Lower Grade (従五位下)	10,000 koku
3	Katō Yasutsura (加藤泰貫)	1716–1727	Ōkura-no-Shōyū (大蔵少輔)	Junior 5th Rank, Lower Grade (従五位下)	10,000 koku
4	Katō Yasuhiro (加藤泰広)	1727–1756	Oribe-no-kami (織部正)	Junior 5th Rank, Lower Grade (従五位下)	10,000 koku
5	Katō Yasunobu (加藤泰宦)	1756–1771	Ōmi-no-kami (近江守)	Junior 5th Rank, Lower Grade (従五位下)	10,000 koku
6	Katō Yasumasa (加藤泰賢)	1771–1810	Izumo-no-kami (出雲守)	Junior 5th Rank, Lower Grade (従五位下)	10,000 koku
7	Katō Yasutomo (加藤泰儔)	1810–1831	Yamashiro-no-kami (山城守)	Junior 5th Rank, Lower Grade (従五位下)	10,000 koku
8	Katō Yasutada (加藤泰理)	1831–1862	Ōkura-no-Shōyū (大蔵少輔)	Junior 5th Rank, Lower Grade (従五位下)	10,000 koku
9	Katō Yasunori (加藤泰令)	1862–1871	Izumo-no-kami (出雲守)	Junior 5th Rank, Lower Grade (従五位下)	10,000 koku

== See also ==
- List of han
- Abolition of the han system
