= Ukena District, Iyo =

Former district in Ehime prefecture, Japan

Ukena District (浮穴郡, Ukena-gun) was a district located in central Iyo Province(Ehime Prefecture). Due to the 1878 Land Reforms, the district was separated into 2 districts written below.

- Kamiukena District - Active (formerly included the parts of the current cities of Seiyo, Ōzu, and parts of the town of Uchiko in Kita District)
- Shimoukena District - In 1896, the district was absorbed by both Iyo and Onsen District and thereby dissolved (formerly covered the cities of Matsuyama, Tōon, Iyo, the town of Tobe in Iyo District, and the town of Uchiko in Kita District)
