= Katō Yasunori =

Former ruler of Niiya Domain

- 加藤泰令
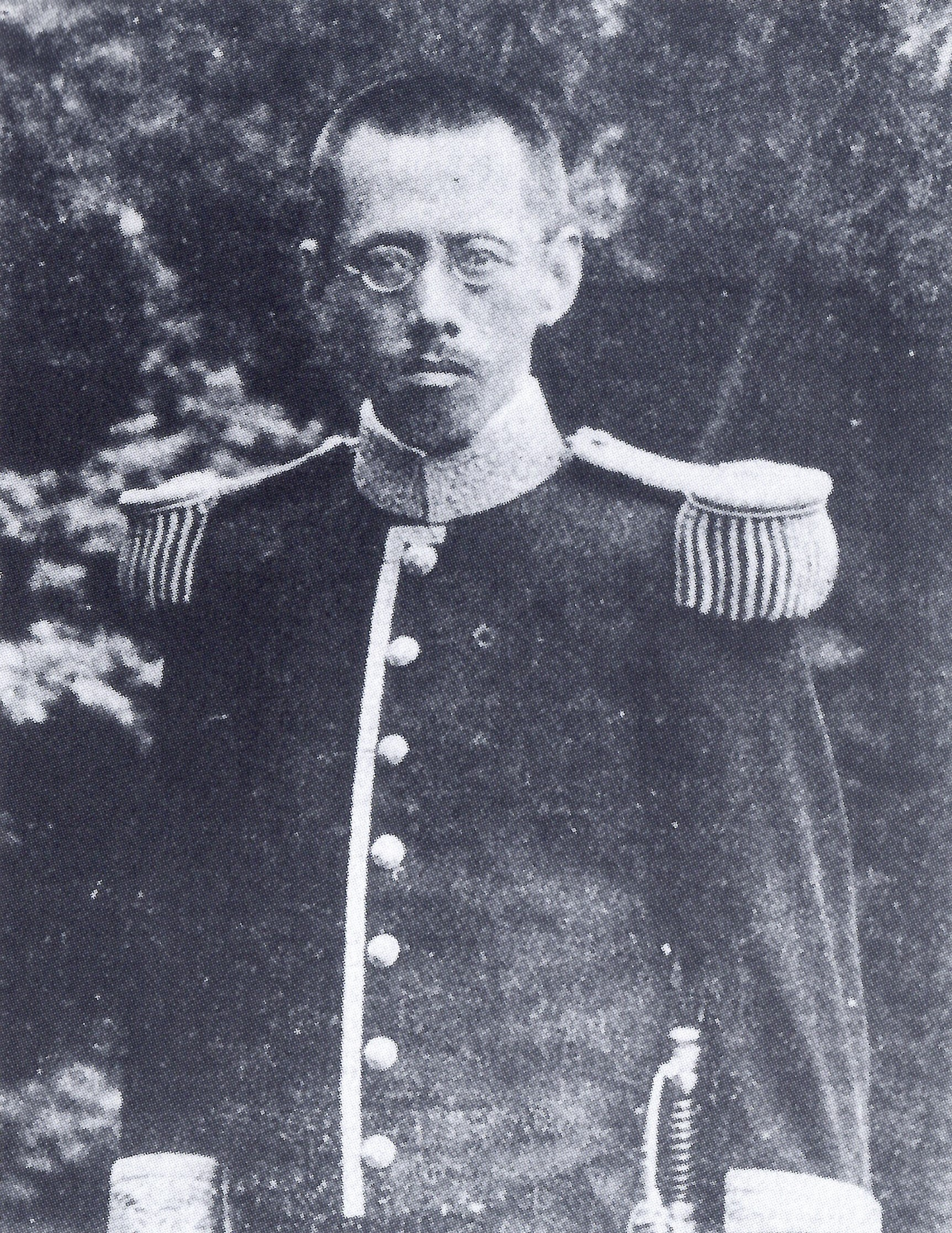
- Photograph of Katō Yasunori

Daimyō of Niiya Domain
- Reign: December 20, 1862 – July 15, 1871
- Predecessor: Katō Yasutada
- Successor: Office abolished
- Born: April 12, 1838
- Died: February 23, 1913; Tokyo, Japan
- Burial: February 23, 1913; Kaizen-ji Temple

Katō Yasunori (加藤泰令, April 12, 1838 – February 23, 1913) was a Japanese aristocrat and the 9th (and final) ruler and the governor of the Niiya Domain in Iyo.

== Biography ==
Yasunori was born as the eldest son of Katō Yasutada. His mother was Keijyuin. His legal wife was the daughter of Katō Yasutada. He had a son named Katō Taisei (second son). He held the official rank of Shosanmi, Yamashiro no Kami, and Izumo no Kami. His childhood name was Shinnosuke. He held the title of Viscount. On December 20, 1862, he succeeded his father as the head of the family due to his retirement. In June 1864, he organized a peasant gun squad called Gosogumi. In June 1869, he became the governor of the Niiya Domain. However, in July 1871, he was dismissed from his position due to the abolition of the domains. In September 1871, he moved to Tokyo and he was granted the title of Viscount on July 8, 1884. He was later promoted to the rank of Shōsanmi. He died on February 23, 1913, at the age of 76.

== See also ==
- Niiya Domain
