= Matsuyama Castle (Iyo) =

Castle in Japan

- 松山城
- Matsuyama, Ehime Prefecture, Japan
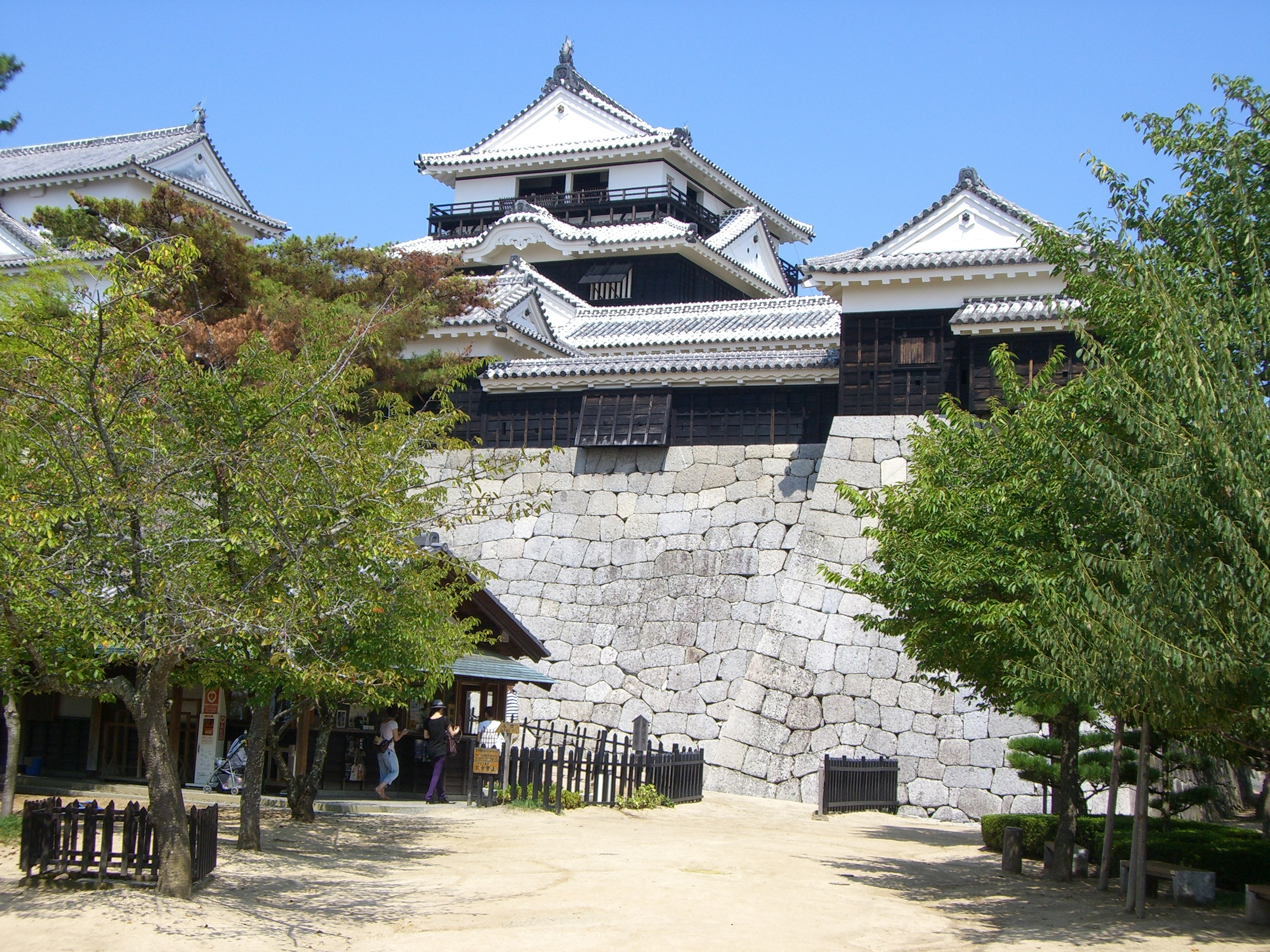
- Matsuyama Castle Tower (tenshu)

Site information
- Type: Japanese castle
- Condition: Largely intact

Location
- Matsuyama Castle Matsuyama Castle (Japan)
- Coordinates: 33°50′44″N 132°45′57″E

Site history
- Built: 1603
- Built by: Kato Yoshiaki

Matsuyama Castle (松山城, Matsuyama-jō) is a "flatland-mountain"-style Japanese castle that was built in 1603 on Mount Katsuyama, in the city of Matsuyama in Ehime Prefecture, Japan. The castle is one of twelve Japanese castles to still have its original tenshu. The castle has been protected as a National Historic Site since 1952. It is also called Iyo-Matsuyama Castle to disambiguate it from Bitchū Matsuyama Castle in Okayama. Tsuyama Castle and Himeji Castle were also built in a similar style around the same time period.

== History ==
During the Muromachi period, central Iyo Province was ruled by the Kōno clan from their stronghold at Yuzuki Castle. However, after the start of the Sengoku period, the Kōno clan was weakened by internal conflicts and became subordinated to strong neighboring warlords such as the Mōri clan and the Chōsokabe clan. After Toyotomi Hideyoshi conquered Shikoku, his general Katō Yoshiaki was rewarded for his services at the Battle of Shizugatake and in 1583 was appointed lord of Masaki with a kokudaka of 60,000 koku. After Hideyoshi's death, Katō joined with Tokugawa Ieyasu at the Battle of Sekigahara, and in reward, was confirmed as daimyō of Iyo-Matsuyama Domain under the Tokugawa shogunate with his kokudaka increased to 200,000 koku.

In 1602, Katō relocated his seat to Matsuyama Castle. The castle was not completed until 1627, and just before its completion, Katō was transferred to Aizu Domain and replaced by Gamō Tadatomo. Under Gamō Tadatomo, a large five-story tenshu was completed. Gamō Tadatomo died in Matsuyama in 1634 without heirs, shortly after completing the Ninomaru bailey. The shogunate then assigned Matsudaira Sadayuki from Kuwana Domain to govern the territory, which was reduced in size to 150,000 koku. His branch of the Matsudaira clan, the "Hisamatsu-Matsudaira", was a shinpan daimyō clan, considered to be closely related to the ruling Tokugawa clan, and would govern Matsuyama until the Meiji Restoration in 1868. Under Matsudaira Sadayuki, the tenshu was rebuilt on a smaller scale in 1642, reducing the height from five stories to three stories. Despite the domain's constant financial issues, the tenshu was rebuilt in 1854 by the 12th daimyō, Matsudaira Katsuyoshi, although it had been destroyed by lightning seventy years previously in 1784.

Following the Meiji Restoration, most of the castle gates, yagura watchtowers, and other structures were demolished by the new Meiji government, and the vacated third bailey became the site of the prefectural headquarters, while the inner bailey became a public park in 1874. From 1886, the second bailey and part of the third bailey became the garrison and headquarters for the Imperial Japanese Army 12th Infantry Regiment. This area would be under military control until 1945.

== Current status of the castle ==
The tenshu, six yagura watchtowers and several gates remain from the original castle, and there are also several reconstructed buildings. In 1935, the tenshu and 34 other structures were designated Important Cultural Properties; however, 11 buildings (including the Tenjin yagura) were destroyed in the Matsuyama Air Raid in World War II. In 1949, the Tsutsu Gate and its east and west yagura were destroyed by arson. In 1989, Matsuyama Castle Park was selected as one of Japan’s “Top 100 Cherry Blossom Spots”.

Matsuyama Castle was listed as one of Japan's Top 100 Castles by the Japan Castle Foundation in 2006. in 2019, an additional nine structures received the designation of Registered Tangible Cultural Properties.

The castle is located a 20-minute walk from JR Shikoku Matsuyama Station.

== Castle Architecture ==
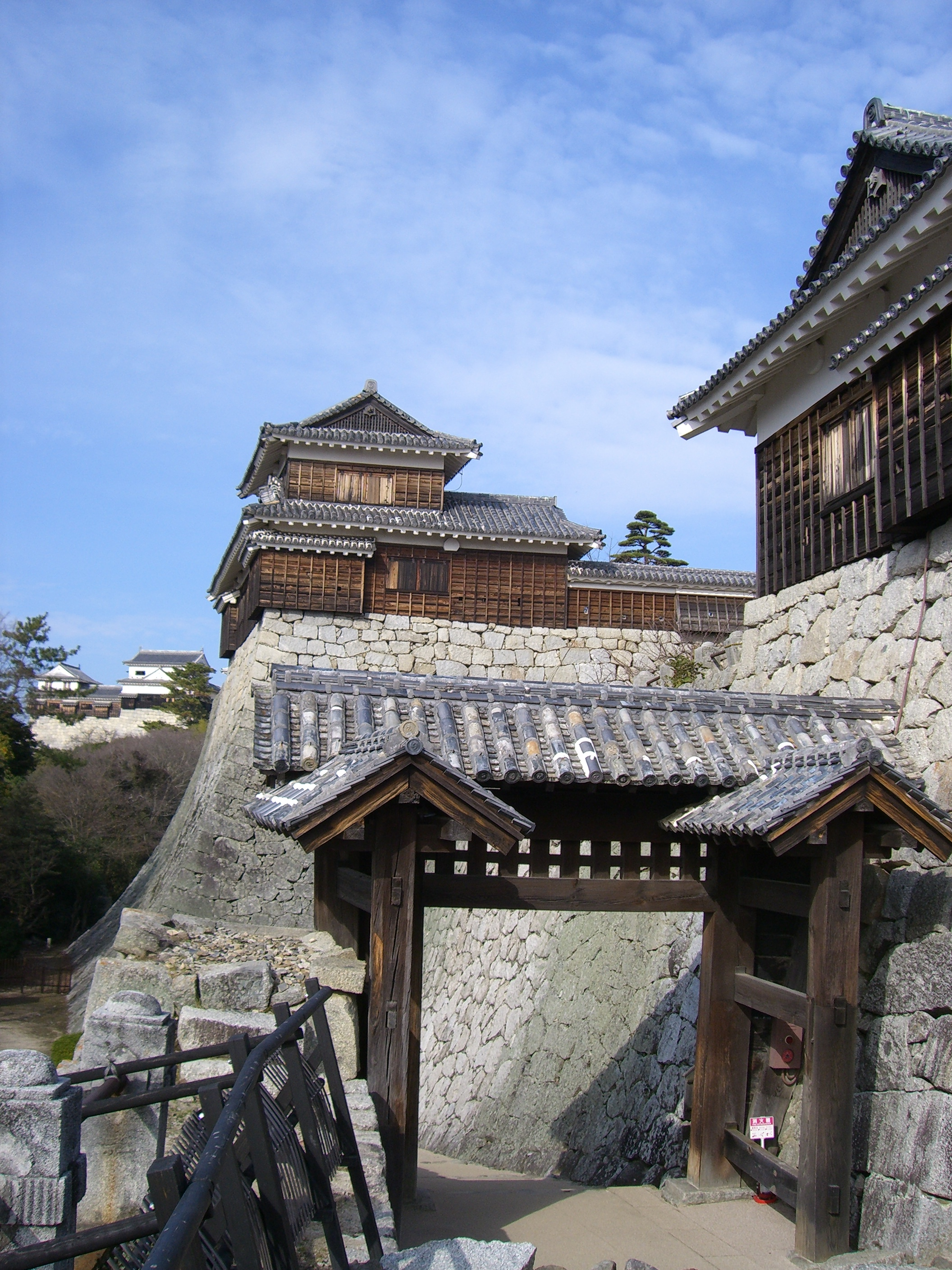
Tonashimon

Matsuyama Castle consists of a Honmaru (main enclosure), a Ninomaru (secondary enclosure), and a Sannomaru (tertiary enclosure), spread over a flat hilltop area of about 400 meters long and 100 meters wide. This area has three masugata-style gates at south, northwest and northeast. The Honmaru is an inner square central area with three corner yagura connected by barrack gates surrounding the tenshu. The south and west edge of central area is protected by curved stone walls built utilizing the cliff as part of its natural defenses. The Ninomaru contains the daimyō residence and garden, and has area of an about 200 square meters. Entry into this secondary area was protected by tall stone walls and water moats. The Sannomaru was 500 meters long square, with tall clay walls and a 50 meter wide water moat. It is now a large park.

Matsuyama castle has a Doorless Gate (Tonashimon), and people who pass through it face the heavily fortified Tsutsuimon with the roof of the Tonashimon. Beside the Tsutsuimon, there is a hidden gate (Kakuremon) that could be used for surprise attacks.

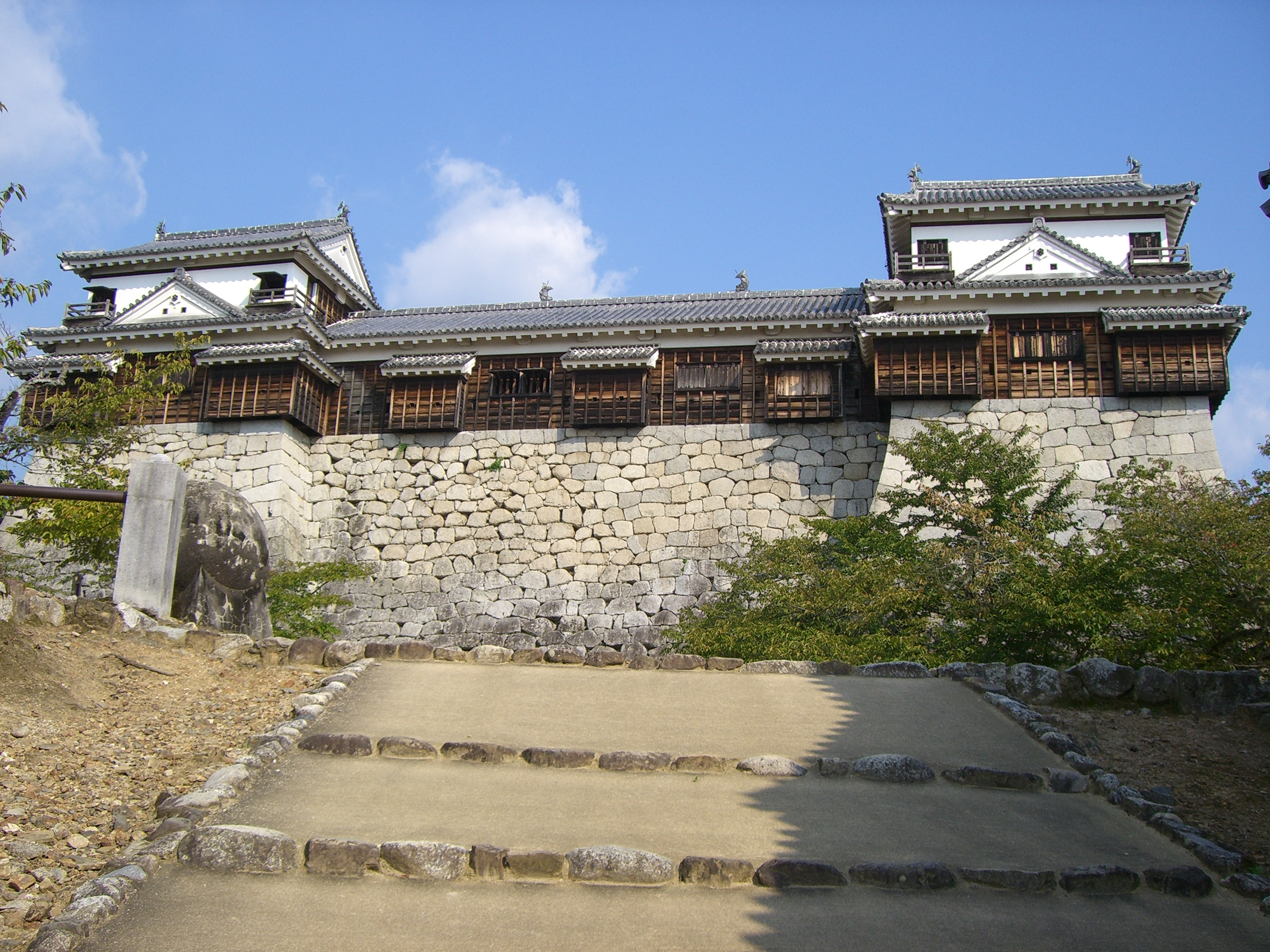
North and South Corner Turret

The northern corner tower (left side) and the southern corner tower (right side) are connected to each other by corridors. There is a south-corner-turret (Minami-sumi-yagura) and a north-corner-turret (Kita-sumi-yagura).

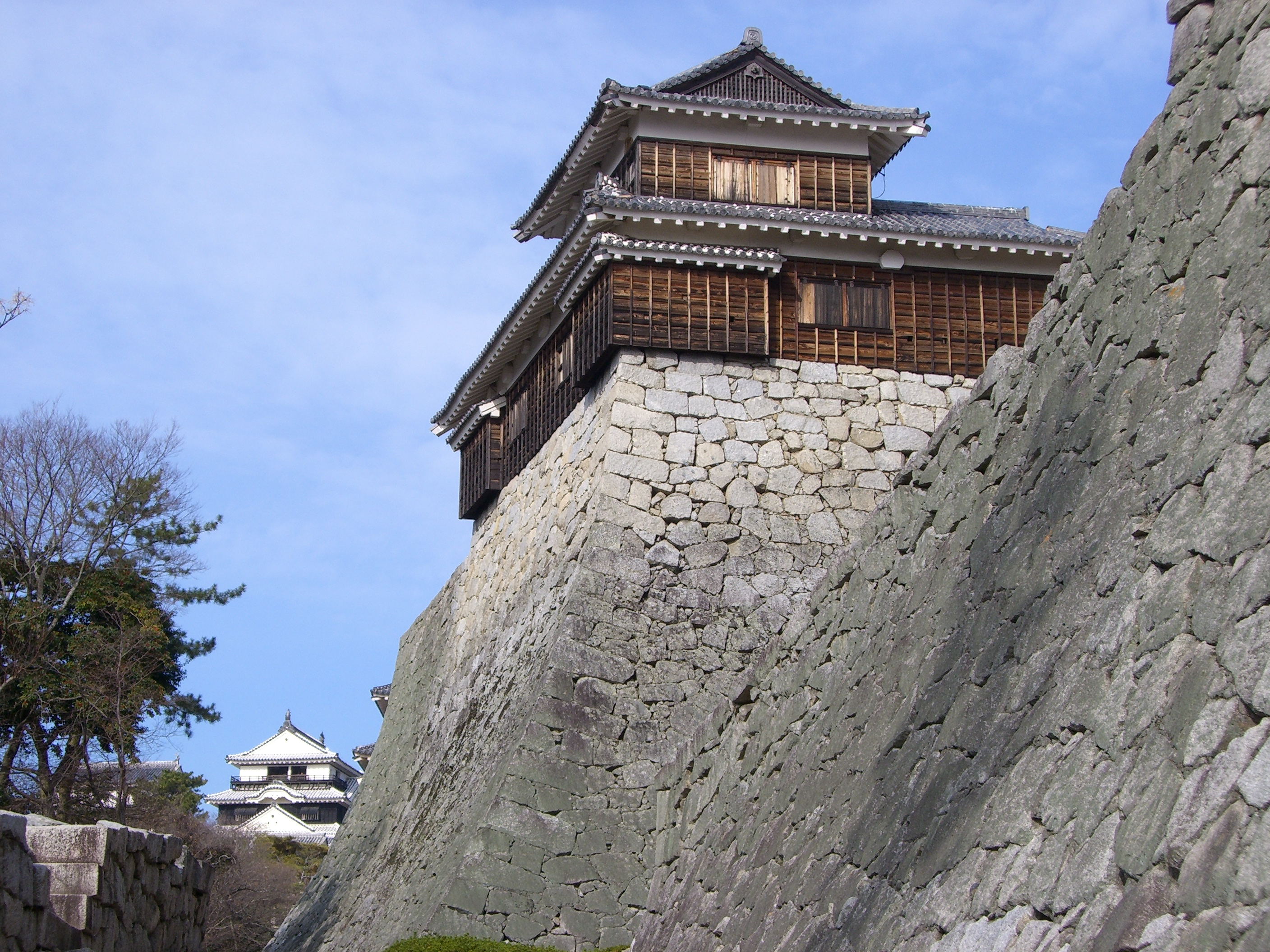
A Drum Tower

On the Taka-ishigaki stone walls overlooking the Tonashimon there is a Drum Tower (Taiko-yagura) with stone-dropping windows. Taiko drums were set up to warn of enemies approaching the inner enclosure of the castle.

== Cultural Properties ==
=== National Important Cultural Properties ===
- Tenshu (天守閣, Tenshukaku), rebuilt in 1854, but in its original style with black-colored wooden walls. It has three floors and one basement, and its interior is quite simple compared with the towers built at earlier period. It was designated an Important Cultural Property (ICP) in 1935.
- San-no-mon South Turret (三ノ門南櫓, San-no-mon minami yagura)
- Ni-no-mon South Turret (二ノ門南櫓, Ni-nomon minami yagura)
- Ichi-no-mon South Turret (一ノ門南櫓, Ichi-no-mon minami yagura)
- Inui Turret (乾櫓, Inui yagura)
- Nohara Turret (野原櫓, Nohara Yagura)
- Partition Gate (仕切門, Shikirimon)
- San-no-mon Gate (三ノ門, San-no-mon)
- Ni-no-mon Gate (二ノ門, Ni-no-mon)
- Ichi-no-mon Gate (一ノ門, Ichi-no-mon)
- Shichikumon Gate (紫竹門, Shichikumon)
- Kakuremon Gate (隠門, Kakuremon)
- Kakuremon Tsuzuki Turret (隠門続櫓, Kakuremon Tsuzuki Yagura)
- Tonashi Gate (戸無門, Tonashimon)
- Partition Gate Inner Wall (仕切門内塀, Shikirimon Uchibei)
- Sannomon East Wall (三ノ門東塀, Sannomon Higashibei)
- Iron Gate East Wall (筋鉄門東塀, Sujitetsu Higashibei)
- Ninomon East Wall (二ノ門東塀, Ninomon Higashibei)
- Ichinomon East Wall (一ノ門東塀, Ichinomon Higashibei)
- Shichikumon East Wall (紫竹門東塀, Shichikumon Higashibei)
- Shichikumon West Wall (紫竹門西塀, Shichikumon Nishibei)

=== Registered Tangible Cultural Properties ===
- Matsuyama Castle Internal Gate (松山城内門, Matsuyama-jō Naimon)
- North Corner Turret (北隅櫓, Jōhoku sumi yagura)
- Matsuyama Castle Entry (松山城玄関, Matsuyama-jō genkan)
- Entrance Tamon Turret (玄関多聞櫓, Genkan Tamon yagura)
- Small Keep (小天守閣, Kotenshukaku)
- Ten-ken Corridor (十間廊下, Tenken roka)
- Reinforced Iron Gate (筋鉄門, Sujitetsumon)
- Tamon Turret (多聞櫓, Tamon yagura)
- Tsutsui Gate (筒井門, Tsutsui mon)
- Tsutsui Gate West Tower (筒井門西続櫓, Tsutsuimon nishi zoku yagura)
- Tsutsui Gate Higashizukuri Turret (筒井門東続櫓, Tsutsui Montō zoku yagura)
- South Corner Turret (南隅櫓, Minami sumi yagura)

== Photo gallery ==
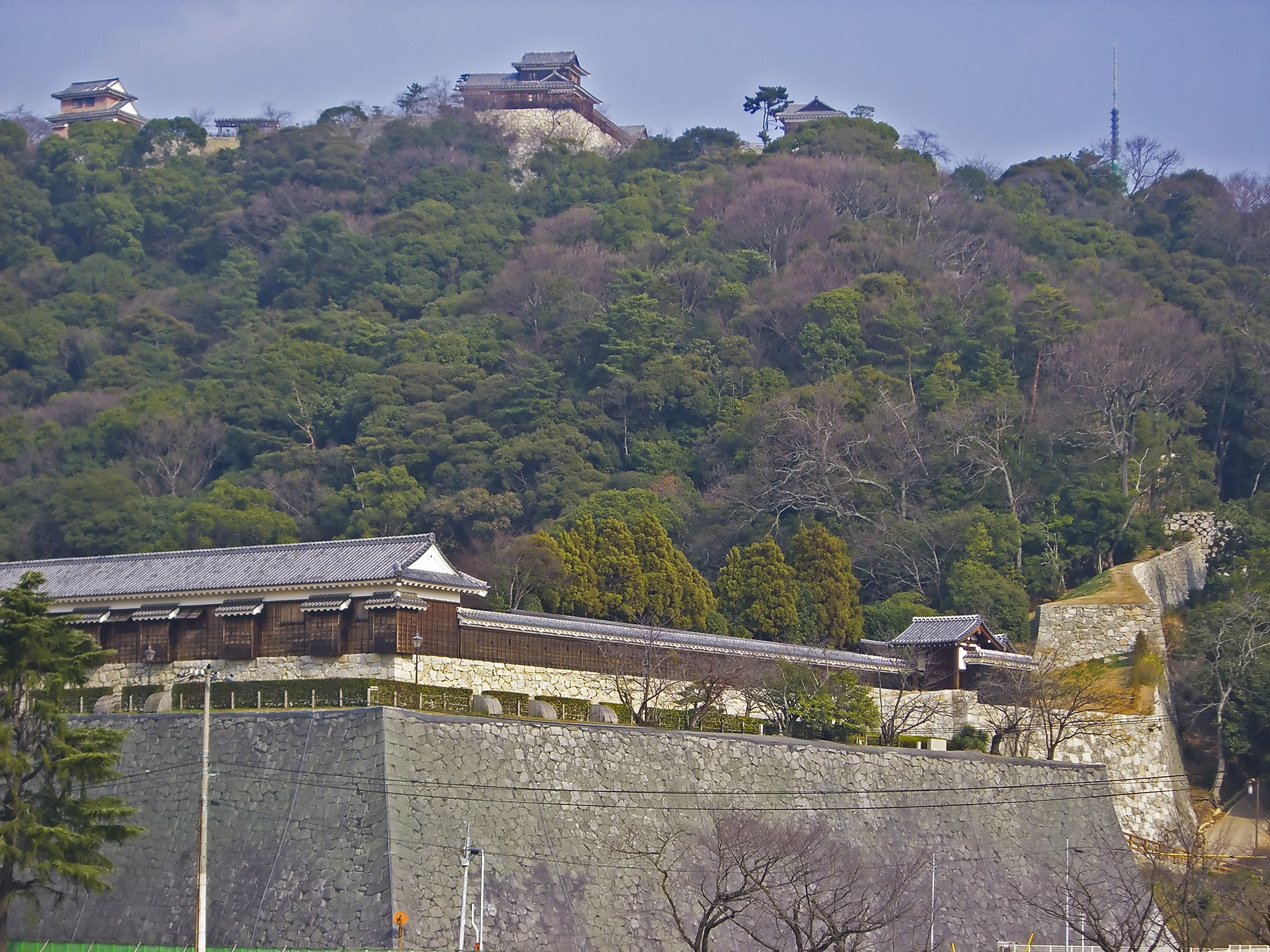
The Castle Mountain views

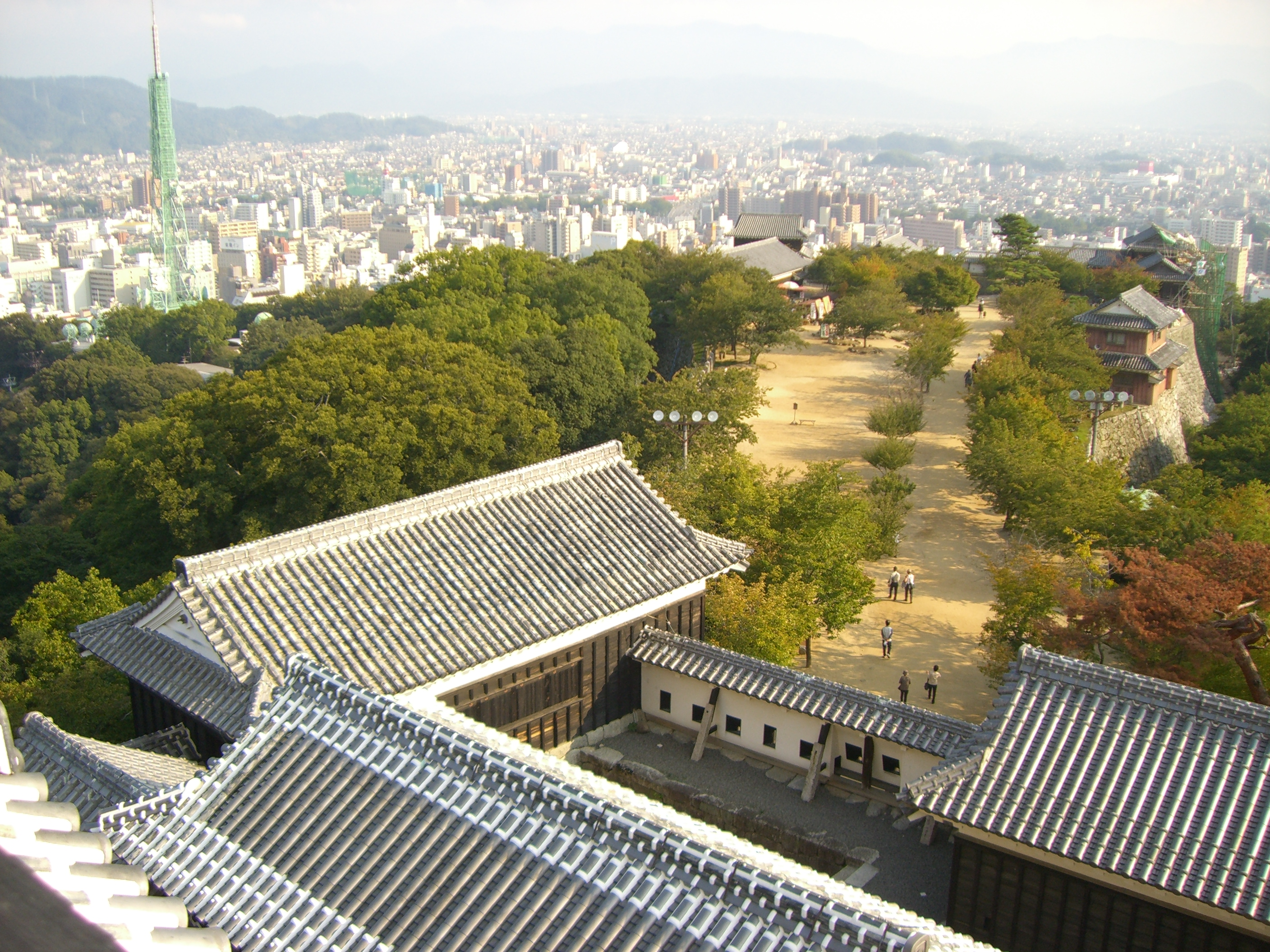
The view from Matsuyama Castle Tower

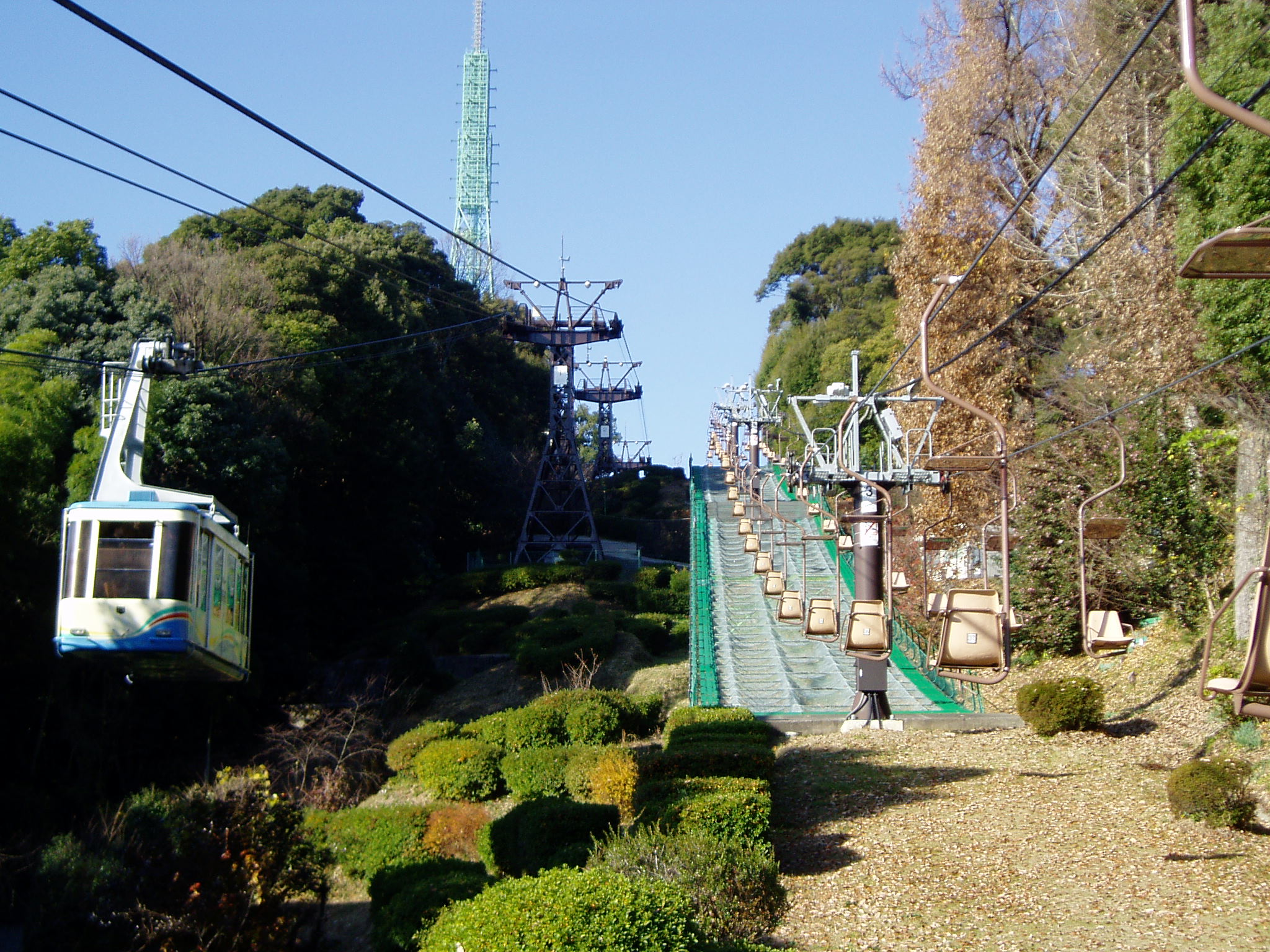
The Matsuyama castle Ropeway&Chairlift

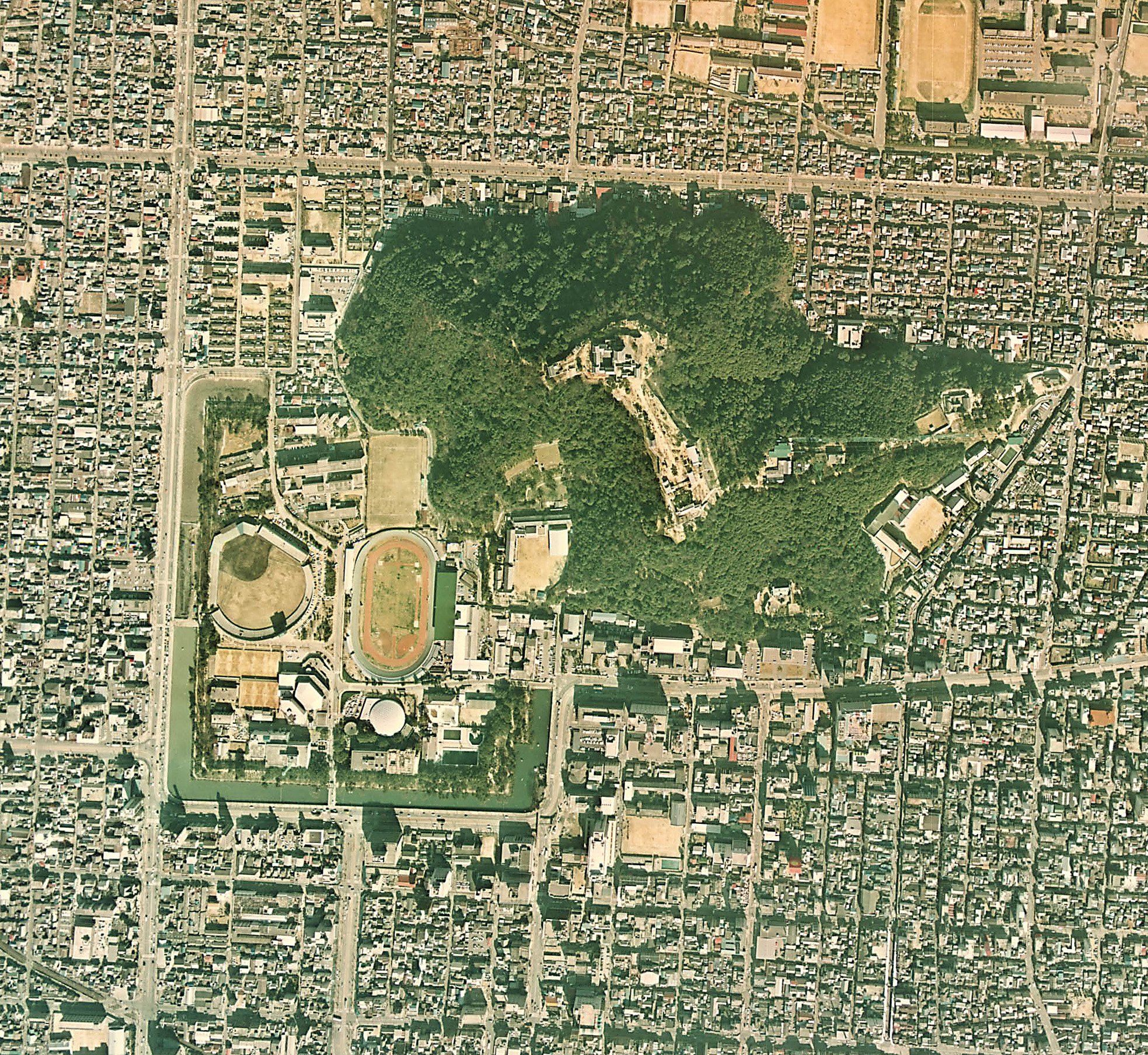
An aerial view of Matsuyama Castle (1974)

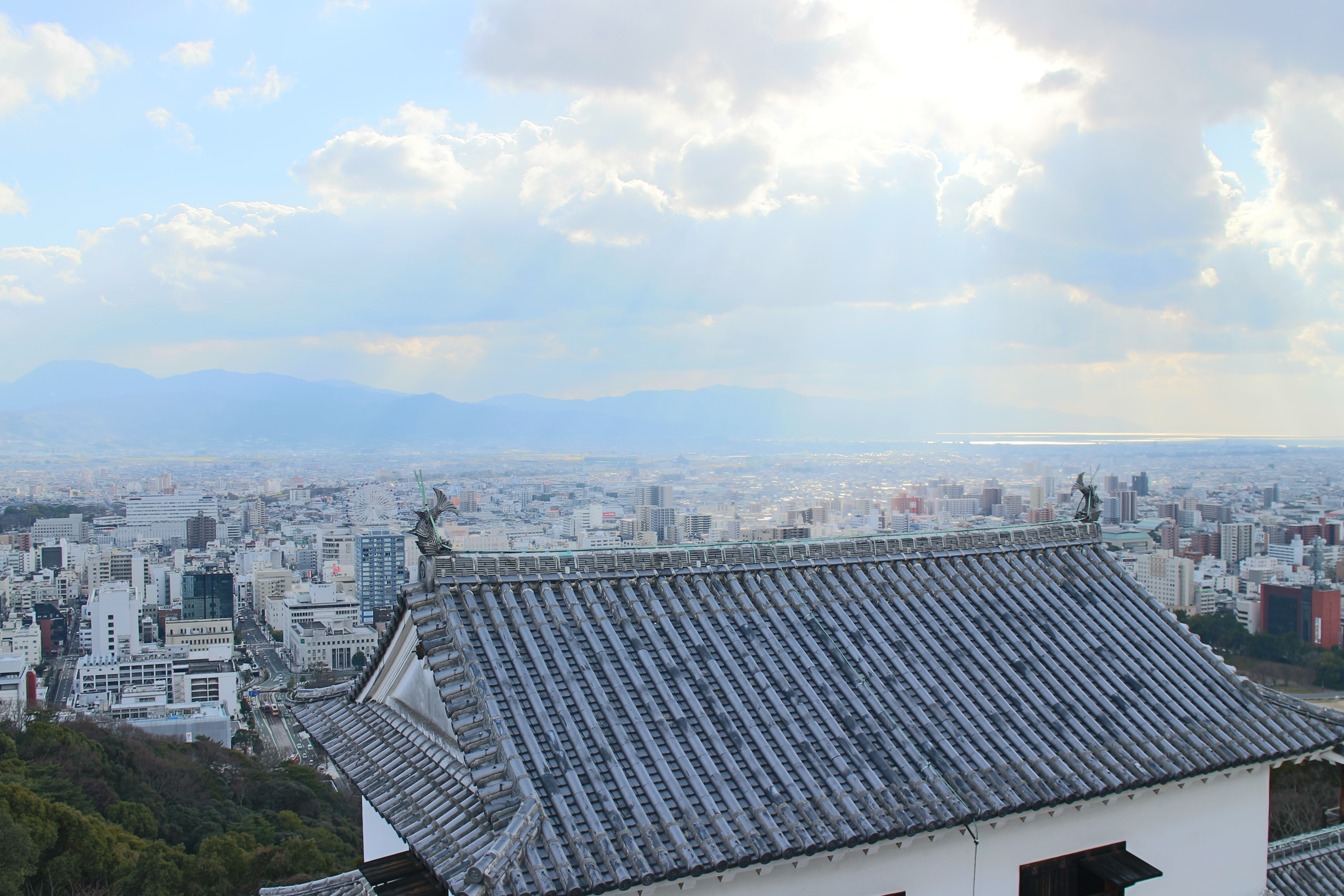
The view of Matsuyama city from Matsuyama castle

== Literature ==
- De Lange, William (2021). An Encyclopedia of Japanese Castles. Groningen: Toyo Press. pp. 600 pages. ISBN 978-9492722300.
- Schmorleitz, Morton S. (1974). Castles in Japan. Tokyo: Charles E. Tuttle Co. ISBN 0-8048-1102-4.
- Motoo, Hinago (1986). Japanese Castles. Tokyo: Kodansha. p. 200 pages. ISBN 0-87011-766-1.
- Mitchelhill, Jennifer (2013). Castles of the Samurai:Power & Beauty. USA: Kodansha. ISBN 978-1568365121.
