= Masaki, Ehime =

Masaki 松前町
- Town
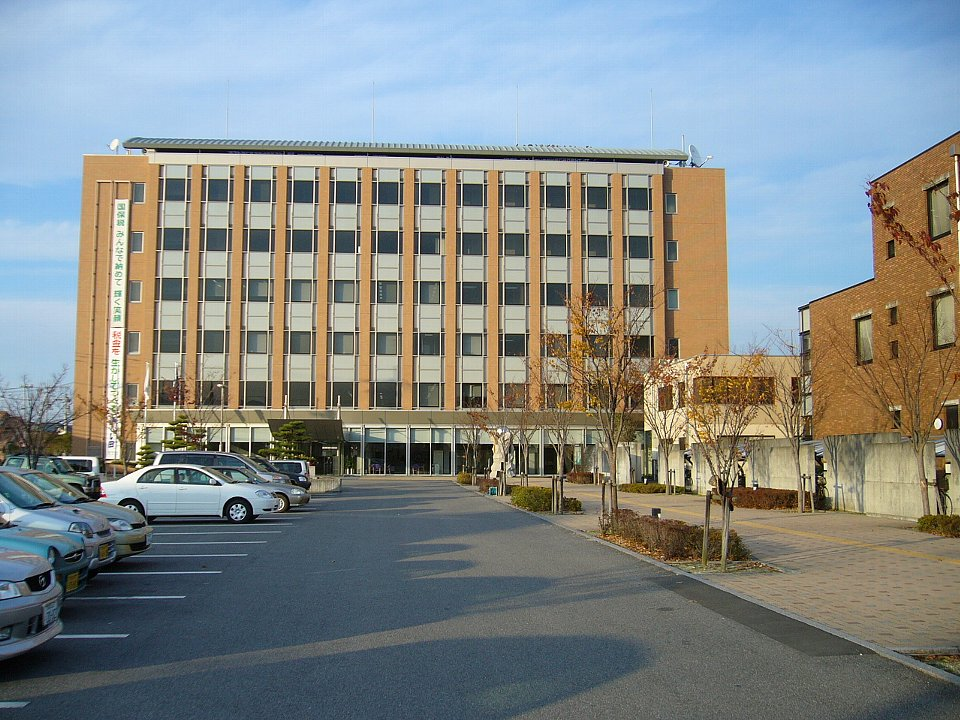
- Masaki Town Hall

- Flag Emblem
- Interactive map of Masaki
- Location in Japan
- Coordinates: 33°47′N 132°43′E
- Country: Japan
- Region: Shikoku
- Prefecture: Ehime
- District: Iyo

Government
  - Mayor: Yasushi Okamoto

Area
  - Total: 20.41 km^{2} (7.88 sq mi)

Population (September 1, 2022)
  - Total: 30,411
  - Density: 1,490/km^{2} (3,859/sq mi)
- Time zone: UTC+09:00 (JST)
- City hall address: 6-3-1 Tsutsui, Masaki-chō, Iyo-gun, Ehime-ken 791-3192
- Website: Official website
- Symbols
- Flower: Sunflower (向日葵, Himawari)
- Tree: Pine (松, Matsu)

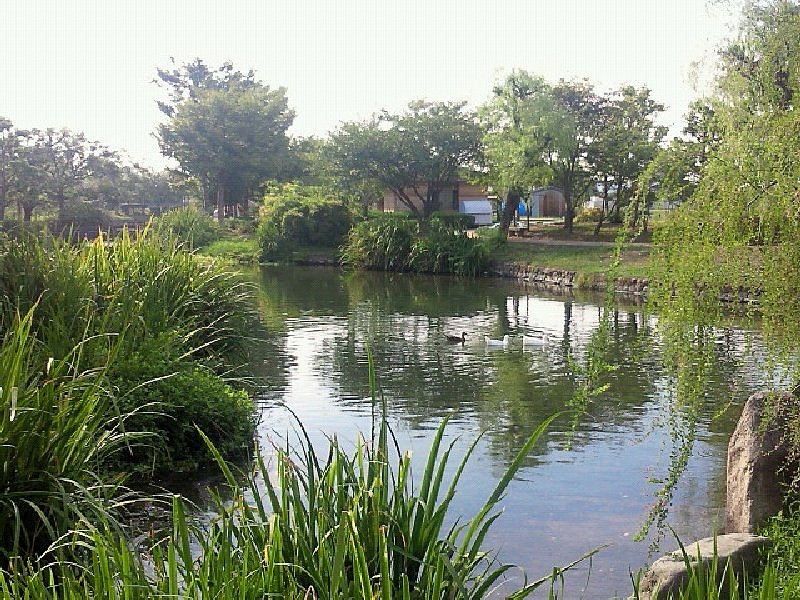
Hyokotan Park

Masaki (Japanese: 松前町, Hepburn: Masaki-chō) is a town located in Iyo District, Ehime Prefecture, Japan. As of 1 September 2022, the town had an estimated population of 30,411 in 13768 households and a population density of 1500 persons per km². The total area of the town is 20.41 square kilometres (7.88 sq mi). It is the smallest municipality in terms of area in Ehime Prefecture.

== Geography ==
Masaki faces the Seto Inland Sea, and is located at the southern end of the Dogo Plain in the northwestern part of the island of Shikoku. It is the only municipality in Ehime Prefecture that does not have any mountains. The town area is longer in the east-west direction than in the north-south direction.

=== Surrounding municipalities ===
Ehime Prefecture

- Iyo
- Matsuyama
- Tobe

=== Climate ===
Masaki has a humid subtropical climate (Köppen Cfa) characterized by warm summers and cool winters with light snowfall. The average annual temperature in Masaki is 15.2 °C. The average annual rainfall is 1777 mm with September as the wettest month. The temperatures are highest on average in January, at around 26.1 °C, and lowest in January, at around 4.5 °C.

== Demographics ==
Per Japanese census data, the population of Masaki has recently plateaued after a long period of growth.

Historical population
Year	Pop.	±%
1920	13,216	—
1930	13,745	+4.0%
1940	14,916	+8.5%
1950	22,054	+47.9%
1960	21,784	−1.2%
1970	23,900	+9.7%
1980	27,568	+15.3%
1990	29,407	+6.7%
2000	30,277	+3.0%
2010	30,359	+0.3%
2020	29,630	−2.4%

== History ==
The area of Masaki was part of ancient Iyo province. Masaki was developed as a castle town by Kato Yoshiaki in the late Sengoku period; however, when he relocated to Matsuyama Castle, and of the merchants and artisans relocated with him. in the Edo Period, most of the area wash part of Matsuyama Domain with a smaller portion under the control of Ōzu Domain. The village of Masaki was established on December 15, 1889 with the creation of the modern municipalities system. It was elevated to town status on October 31, 1922. Masaki annexed neighboring Okada and Kita-Iyo villages on March 31, 1955.

== Government ==
Masaki has a mayor-council form of government with a directly elected mayor and a unicameral town council of 14 members. Masaki, together with the city of Tobe, contributes two members to the Ehime Prefectural Assembly. In terms of national politics, the town is part of Ehime 2nd district of the lower house of the Diet of Japan.

== Economy ==
Masaki is an industrial center for the production of textiles and synthetic fibers. Food processing is also a component of the local economy. The area was traditionally dependent on commercial fishing and on agriculture, and is increasingly becoming a commuter town for neighboring Matsuyama.

== Education ==
Masaki has three public elementary schools and three public middle school operated by the town government, and one public high school operated by the Ehime Prefectural Board of Education.

== Transportation ==
=== Railways ===
Shikoku Railway Company - Yosan Line

- Kita-Iyo - Iyo-Yokota

Iyotetsu Gunchū Line

- Okada - Koizumi - Masaki - Jizōmachi

=== Highway ===
- National Route 56

== Points of interest ==
- Kubota Palm Garden

== Noted people from Masaki ==
- Reiko Kataoka, actress
