= Kubota Palm Garden =

Botanical garden in Shikoku, Japan

- 窪田椰子園
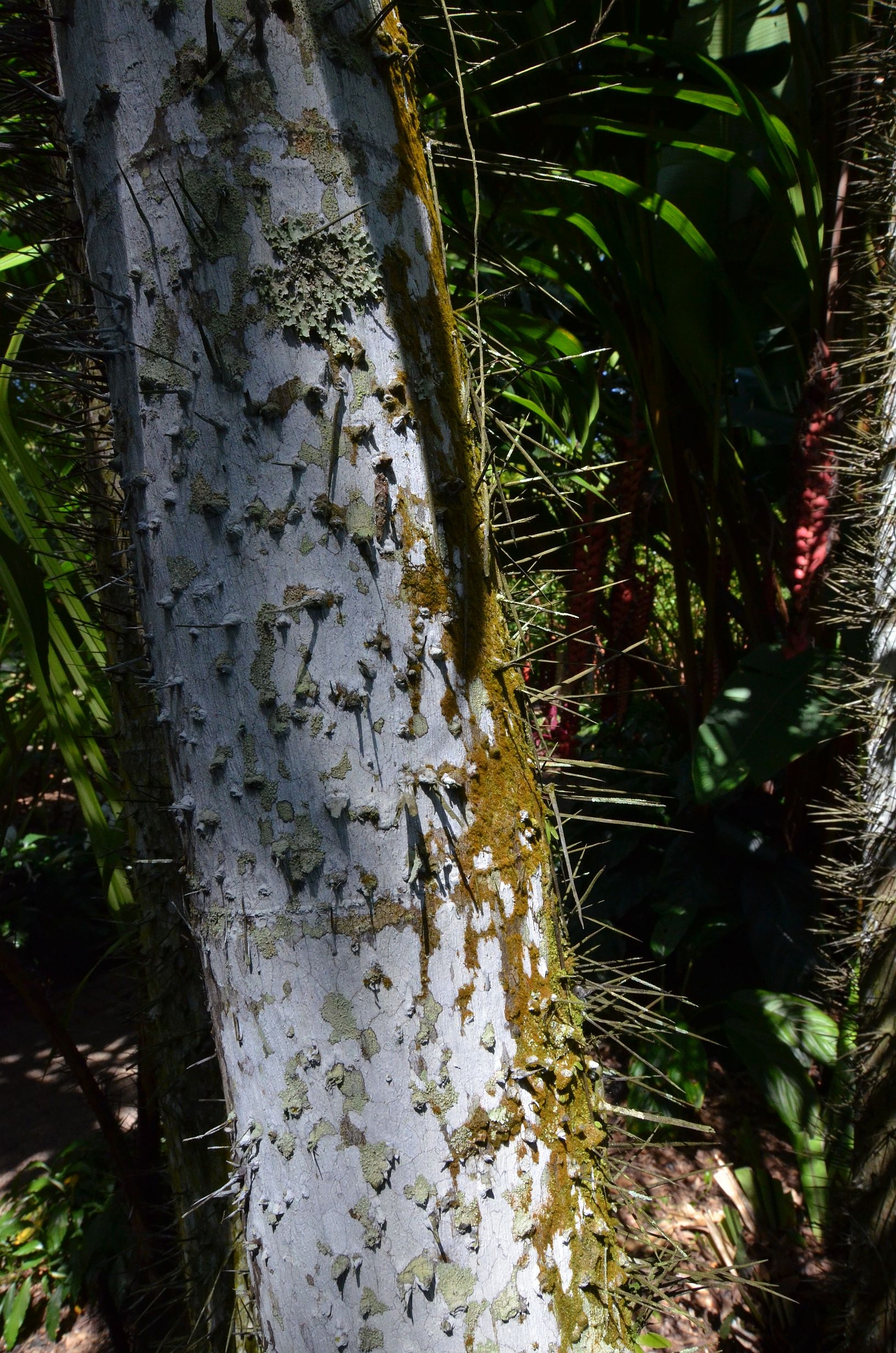
- Trunk with spines of the palm "Nipon yashi" (Oncosperma tigillarium) native to Malaysia where it is called "Nibung".
- Interactive map of Kubota Palm Garden
- Location: Nakagawara 928, Masaki, Iyo-gun, Ehime Prefecture 791-3192, Shikoku, Japan
- Coordinates: 33°41′15.72″N 132°48′13.32″E
- Area: 1.5 hectares (3.7 acres)
- Established: 1935
- Species: 70
- Website: {{URL|example.com|optional display text}}

The Kubota Palm Garden (窪田椰子園, Kubota Yashien) is a botanical garden specializing in Arecaceae. It is located at Nakagawara 928, Masaki, Iyo-gun, Ehime Prefecture 791-3192, Shikoku, Japan, and open seven days a week with free admission. The garden was established circa 1935, and now contains over 70 species of Palmae on 1.5 hectares.
