= Tōon =

Tōon 東温市
- City
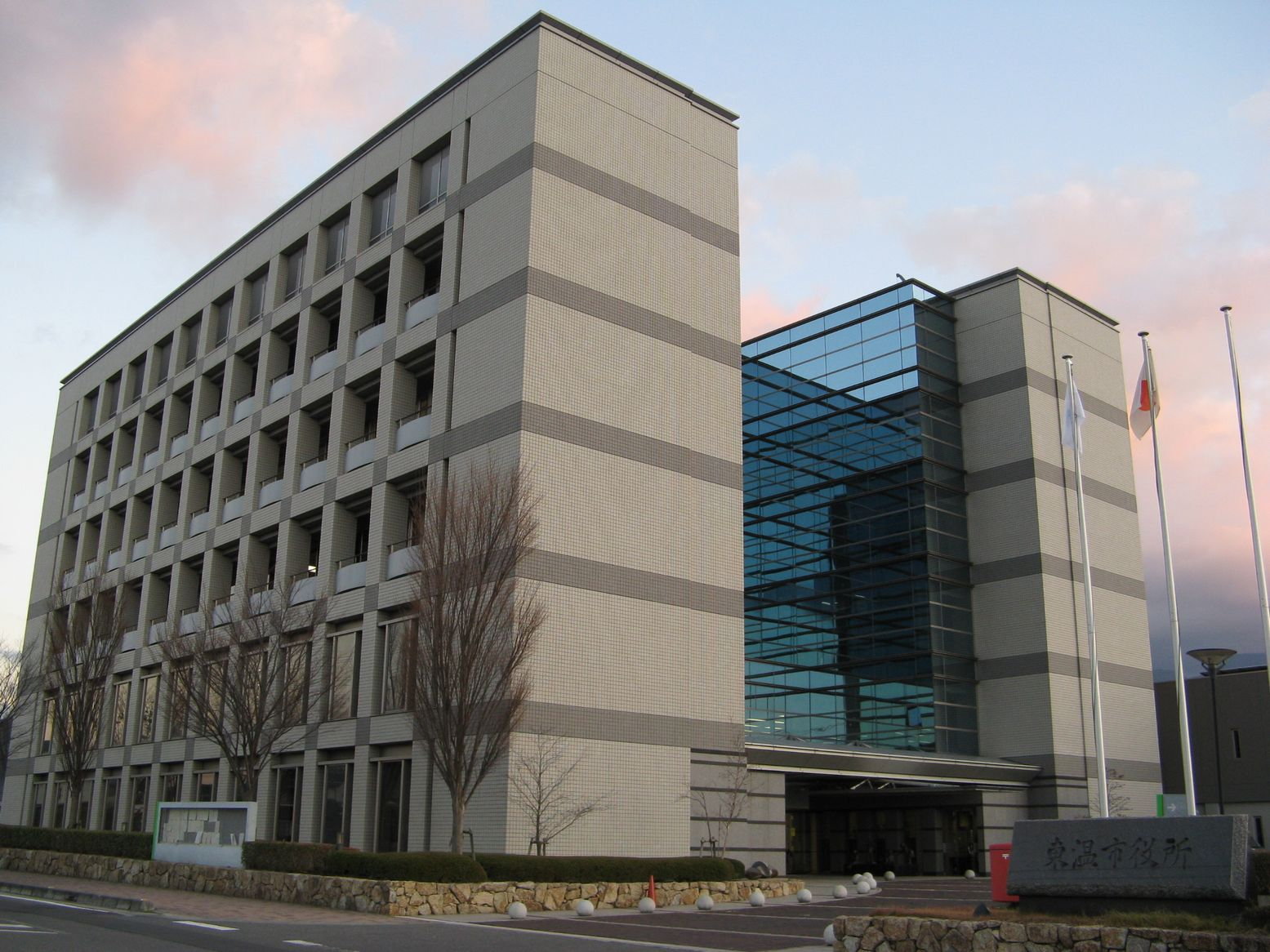
- Tōon City Hall

- Flag Seal
- Location of Tōon in Ehime Prefecture

- Location in Japan
- Coordinates: 33°47′34.096″N 132°52′16.631″E
- Country: Japan
- Region: Shikoku
- Prefecture: Ehime

Government
  - Mayor: Akira Katō (since November 2016)

Area
  - Total: 211.30 km^{2} (81.58 sq mi)

Population (September 1, 2022)
  - Total: 33,276
  - Density: 157.48/km^{2} (407.88/sq mi)
- Time zone: UTC+09:00 (JST)
- Postal code: 791-0299
- City hall address: 530-1 Minara, Tōon-shi, Ehime-ken 791-0292
- Website: Official website
- Symbols
- Flower: Sakura (桜)
- Tree: Flowering dogwood (花水木, Hanamizuki)

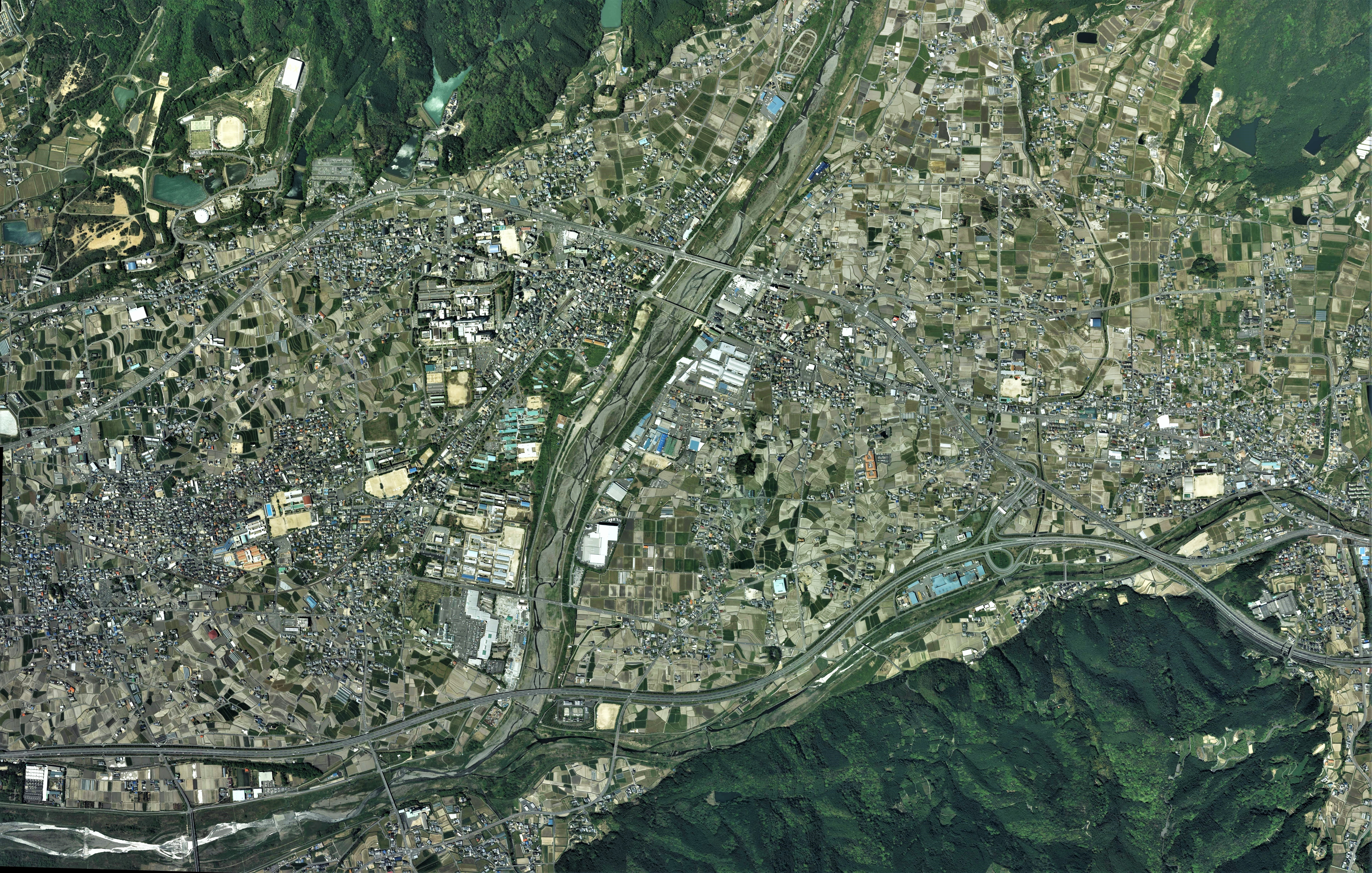
Aerial view of Tōon city center

Tōon (東温市, Tōon-shi) is a city located in Ehime Prefecture, Japan. As of 1 September 2022, the city had an estimated population of 33,276 in 15571 households and a population density of 160 persons per km^{2}. The total area of the city is 211.30 square kilometres (81.58 sq mi). The city name may be romanized as 'Toon', 'Tôon', 'Tōon' or 'Tohon'.

== Geography ==
Tōon is located in central Ehime Prefecture on the island of Shikoku. It is the only city in Ehime Prefecture that does not face the sea. Located at the top of the alluvial fan of Dogo Plain, Toon is bordered on the east by Matsuyama, and with Saijō through a pass called Sakurasanri, with Kumakōgen to the south, and Imabari to the north. The Shigenobu River and its tributaries flow through the city, forming a small alluvial fan.

=== Neighbouring municipalities ===
Ehime Prefecture

- Imabari
- Kumakōgen
- Matsuyama
- Saijō

=== Climate ===
Tōon has a humid subtropical climate (Köppen Cfa) characterized by warm summers and cool winters with light snowfall. The average annual temperature in Tōon is 13.9 °C. The average annual rainfall is 1770 mm with September as the wettest month. The temperatures are highest on average in January, at around 25.0 °C, and lowest in January, at around 2.8 °C.

== Demographics ==
Per Japanese census data, the population of Tōon grew slowly throughout the late 20th century and has plateaued in recent decades.

Historical population
Year	Pop.	±%
1960	25,533	—
1970	23,369	−8.5%
1980	29,276	+25.3%
1990	31,753	+8.5%
2000	34,701	+9.3%
2010	35,253	+1.6%
2020	33,903	−3.8%

== History ==
The area of Tōon was part of ancient Iyo Province. During the Edo Period, the area was part of the holdings of Matsuyama Domain. Following the Meiji restoration, the area was organized into villages within Onsen District, Ehime. The village of Kawauchi was created by the merger of the villages of Kawakami (川上村) and Miuchi (三内村) on April 25, 1955, and raised to town status on September 1, 1956. The town of Shigenobu was created on September 1, 1956, by the merger of the villages of Kitayoshii (北吉井村), Minamiyoshii (南吉井村) and Haishi (拝志村). The city of Tōon was established on September 21, 2004, from the merger of the towns of Kawauchi and Shigenobu.

== Government ==
Tōon has a mayor-council form of government with a directly elected mayor and a unicameral city council of 16 members. Tōon contributes one member to the Ehime Prefectural Assembly.

In terms of national politics, Tōon is part of Ehime 3rd district of the lower house of the Diet of Japan. Prior to 2022, the city was part of Ehime 2nd district.

== Economy ==
Tōon has a mixed economy centered on agriculture and light manufacturing. It is also one of the leading production areas of hulless barley in Japan, and other important crops include paddy rice, wheat, vegetables, flowers, and mandarin oranges. Industry includes electrical machinery, production machinery and food processing. Tōon has head office and production base of PHC, a subsidiary of PHC Holdings (formerly Matsushita Kotobuki Electronics Co., Ltd.), which is located in Minamigata district, where blood sugar level measurement sensors and other products are manufactured. The city has Ehime University Hospital, national Ehime Medical Center, and (private) Ehime Jūzen Medical Technology School with its attached hospital, among other medical offices, which, along with national Shikoku Cancer Center located close to the city, attracts many healthcare professionals and students. Due to its well-developed transportation network, industry is expanding, and the city is increasingly becoming a commuter town for neighboring Matsuyama.

== Education ==
Tōon has seven public elementary schools and two public middle schools operated by the city government, and one public high school operated by the Ehime Prefectural Board of Education. The prefecture also operates two special education schools for the handicapped. The medical school of Ehime University is located in Tōon.

== Transportation ==
=== Railways ===
Iyotetsu - Yokogawara Line

- Ushibuchidanchi-mae - Ushibuchi - Tanokubo - Minara - Aidai Igakubu Minamiguchi - Yokogawara

=== Highways ===
- Matsuyama Expressway
- National Route 11
- National Route 494
