= Kawauchi, Ehime =

Dissolved municipality in Ehime prefecture, Japan

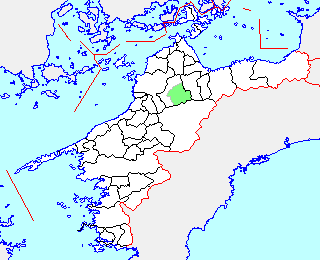
Kawauchi in Ehime Prefecture

Flag of Kawauchi, Ehime

Kawauchi (川内町, Kawauchi-chō) was a town located in Onsen District, Ehime Prefecture, Japan.

As of 2003, the town had an estimated population of 11,159 and a density of 100.66 persons per km^{2}. The total area was 110.86 km^{2}.

On September 21, 2004, Kawauchi, along with the town of Shigenobu (also from Onsen District), was merged to create the city of Tōon and no longer exists as an independent municipality.
