= Shimpan =

Shimpan may refer to:

- Judge (sumo) (Japanese: 審判, romanized: Shimpan), ringside judges in sumo
- Shinpan (daimyo) (Japanese: 親藩), a class of daimyō in the Tokugawa Shogunate of Japan
