= Hōjō, Ehime =

Dissolved municipality in Ehime prefecture, Japan

Hōjō (北条市, Hōjō-shi) was a city located in Ehime Prefecture, Japan. The city was founded on November 1, 1958.

As of 2003, the city had an estimated population of 28,292 and the density of 277.02 persons per km^{2}. The total area was 102.13 km^{2}.

On January 1, 2005, Hōjō, along with the town of Nakajima (from Onsen District), was merged into the expanded city of Matsuyama and no longer exists as an independent municipality. Hōjō still has its own train station on the JR Yosan Line (Station Y48).
