= Shigenobu, Ehime =

Town in Japan

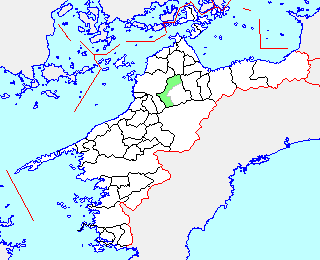
Shigenobu in Ehime Prefecture

Shigenobu (重信町, Shigenobu-chō) was a town located in Onsen District, Ehime Prefecture, Japan.

As of 2003, the town had an estimated population of 23,729 and a density of 235.90 persons per km^{2}. The total area was 100.59 km^{2}.

On September 21, 2004, Shigenobu, along with the town of Kawauchi (also from Onsen District), was merged to create the city of Tōon and no longer exists as an independent municipality.
