= Nakajima, Ehime =

Dissolved municipality in Ehime prefecture, Japan

Nakajima (中島町, Nakajima-chō) was a town located in Onsen District, Ehime Prefecture, Japan.

As of 2003, the town had an estimated population of 5,802 and a density of 155.63 persons per km^{2}. The total area was 37.28 km^{2}.

On January 1, 2005, Nakajima, along with the city of Hōjō, was merged into the expanded city of Matsuyama and no longer exists as an independent municipality.
