= Noma District, Ehime =

Former district in Ehime prefecture, Japan

Noma (野間郡, Noma-gun) was a District located in Eastern Iyo Province (now Ehime Prefecture). Due to the 1878 Land Reforms, the district merged with Ochi District and the district dissolved.

== See also ==
- List of dissolved districts of Japan
