= Wake District, Ehime =

Former district in Ehime prefecture, Japan

Coordinates: 33.890°N 132.741°E

Wake (和気郡, Wake-gun) was a district located in central Iyo Province (Ehime Prefecture) Japan. Due to the 1878 Land Reforms, the district merged with Onsen District and the district dissolved.

== See also ==
- List of dissolved districts in Japan
- Wake District
