= Kume District, Ehime =

Former district in Ehime prefecture, Japan

Kume (久米郡, Kume-gun) was a district located in central Iyo Province (Ehime Prefecture) until 1878. In the 7th century, under the kōri or hyō (評) system, Kume District was established. In 701, under the gun (郡) system, Kume District is supposed to have been established. Due to the 1878 Land Reforms, the district merged with Onsen District and thereby dissolved.

== See also ==
- List of dissolved districts of Japan
- Kume District(Okayama Prefecture)
- Kume District, Hōki
