= Onsen District, Ehime =

District in Ehime Prefecture, Japan

Onsen (温泉郡, Onsen-gun) was a district located in Ehime Prefecture, Japan.

The district had an estimated population of 40,690 and the total area was 248.73 km^{2} (combined calculations of the former towns of Shigenobu, Kawachi, and Nakajima).

== History ==
This district was located in what is currently the center of Matsuyama. It was once known as the Yu District (湯郡, Yu no kōri), where yu means "hot water."

The district was named after the Dōgo Onsen.

- Due to the 1878 Land Reforms, Kasahaya, Wake, and Kume Districts merged with Onsen District.
- December 15, 1889 — Due to the city status enforcement, The city of Matsuyama was formed.
- Around 1897 — Several villages from the Kamiukena District were reassigned to the Onsen District: Ukena, Ebara, Sakamoto, Minamiyoshii, Haishi, and Miuchi.
- During 1897 — The village of Habu (from Iyo District) was reassigned to Onsen District.
- During 1897 — The village of Yodo (from Iyo District) was reassigned to Onsen District. (2 towns, 40 towns)
- November 28, 1898 — The village of Hōjō was elevated to town status. (3 towns, 39 villages)
- October 1, 1914 — Parts of the village of Tateiwa was merged into the village of Asanami.
- April 1, 1923 — The village of Dōgo split and merged into the city of Matsuyama and the town of Dōgoyuno (respectively). (3 towns, 38 villages)
- May 10, 1925 — The village of Furumitsu was merged into the town of Mitsuhama. (3 towns, 37 villages)
- February 11, 1926 — The villages of Soga, Yūgun, Asami and Miyuki were merged into the city of Matsuyama. (3 towns, 33 villages)
- February 1, 1932, parts of the town of Dōgoyuno (former village of Dōgo areas) was merged into the city of Matsuyama.
- June 1, 1937 — The village of Shinhama was merged into the town of Mitsuhama. (3 towns, 32 villages)
- August 1, 1940 — The villages of Mibu, Kuwabara, Wake, Horie, Shiomi and Hisaeda, and the town of Mitsuhama were merged into the city of Matsuyama. (2 towns, 26 villages)
- April 1, 1944 — The villages of Habu and Shōseki, and the town of Dōgoyuno were merged into the city of Matsuyama. (1 town, 24 villages)
- April 1, 1951 — The town of Hōjō, and the villages of Nanba and Masaoka were merged to create the town of Hōjō. (1 town, 22 villages)
- August 1, 1952 — The village of Higashinakajima was elevated to town status. (2 towns, 21 villages)
- February 1, 1954 — The village of Gogoshima was merged into the city of Matsuyama. (2 towns, 20 villages)
- October 1, 1954 — The village of Yodo was merged into the city of Matsuyama. (2 towns, 19 villages)
- March 31, 1955 — The town of Hōjō, and the villages of Asanami, Tateiwa, Kōno and Awai were merged to create the town of Hōjō. (2 towns, 15 villages)
- April 25, 1955 — The villages of Kawakami and Miuchi were merged to create the village of Kawauchi. (2 towns, 14 villages)
- May 1, 1955 — The villages of Idai, Kume, Gomyō and Yuyama were merged into the city of Matsuyama. (2 towns, 12 villages)
- September 1, 1956 — The villages of Kitayoshii, Minamiyoshii and Haishi were merged to create the town of Shigenobu. (3 towns, 9 villages)
- September 1, 1956 — The village of Kawauchi and parts of the village of Nakagawa (from Shūsō District) were merged to create the town of Kawauchi. (4 towns, 8 villages)
- September 30, 1956 — The villages of Ebara and Sakamoto were merged to create the village of Kutani. (4 towns, 7 villages)
- November 1, 1958 — The town of Hōjō was elevated to city status, thus leaving the district. (3 towns, 7 villages)
- March 31, 1959 — The village of Jinwa, and the town of Nakajima were merged to create the town of Nakajima. (3 towns, 6 villages)
- April 10, 1959 — The village of Ukena was merged into the city of Matsuyama. (3 towns, 5 villages)
- March 31, 1960 — The village of Mutsuno was merged into the town of Nakajima. (3 towns, 4 villages)
- December 15, 1961 — The village of Ono was merged into the city of Matsuyama. (3 towns, 3 villages)
- April 1, 1962 — The village of Ishii was merged into the city of Matsuyama. (3 towns, 2 villages)
- March 31, 1963 — The village of Nishinakajima was merged into the town of Nakajima. (3 towns, 1 village)
- October 25, 1968 — The village of Kutani was merged into the city of Matsuyama. (3 towns)
- September 21, 2004 — The towns of Kawauchi and Shigenobu were merged to create the city of Tōon. (1 town)
- January 1, 2005 — The town of Nakajima, along with the city of Hōjō, was merged into the expanded city of Matsuyama. Thus the Onsen District was dissolved.

== See also ==
- List of dissolved districts of Japan
