= Iyo Province =

Former province of Japan

Japanese name
- Kana: いよのくに
- Kyūjitai: 伊豫國
- Shinjitai: 伊予国
Transcriptions
- Revised Hepburn: Iyo no kuni

Iyo Province

Japanese name
- Kana: よしゅう
- Kyūjitai: 豫州
- Shinjitai: 予州
Transcriptions
- Revised Hepburn: Yoshū

Map of Japanese provinces (1868) with Iyo Province highlighted

Iyo Province (伊予国, Iyo no Kuni; Japanese pronunciation: [í.jò̞ (nò̞ kɯ̈̀.ɲ̟ì)]) was a province of Japan in the area of northwestern Shikoku. Iyo bordered on Sanuki Province to the northeast, Awa to the east, and Tosa to the south. Its abbreviated form name was Yoshū (予州). In terms of the Gokishichidō system, Iyo was one of the provinces of the Nankaidō circuit. Under the Engishiki classification system, Iyo was ranked as one of the "upper countries" (上国) in terms of importance, and one of the "far countries" (遠国) in terms of distance from the capital. The provincial capital was located in what is now the city of Imabari, but its exact location is still unknown. The ichinomiya of the province is the Ōyamazumi Shrine located on the island of Ōmishima in what is now part of Imabari. The people spoke Iyo dialect.

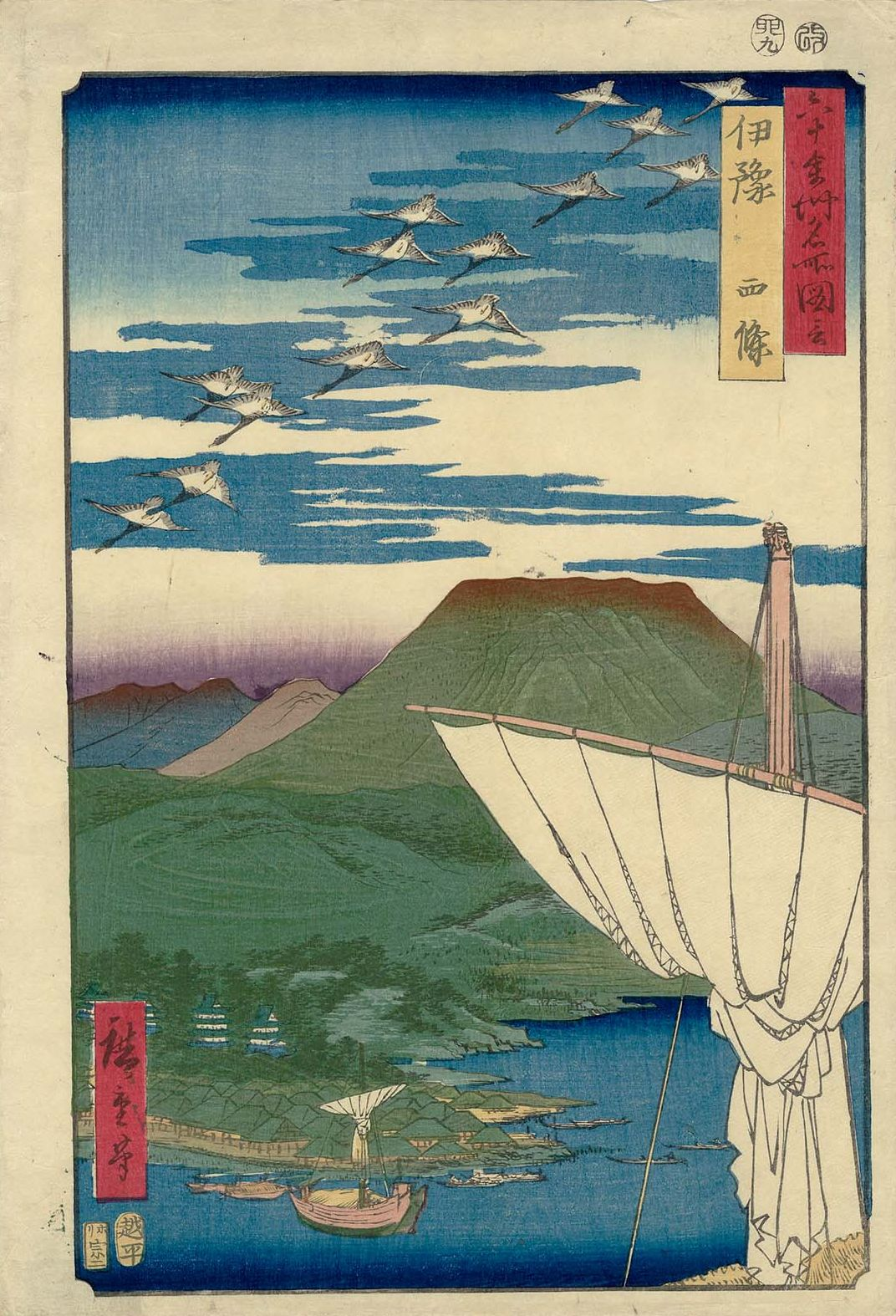
Hiroshige ukiyo-e "Iyo" in "The Famous Scenes of the Sixty States" (六十余州名所図会), depicting the port city of Saijō

== History ==
Iyo Province was formed by the Ritsuryo reforms by combining the territories of the Iyo-no-kuni no miyatsuko (伊余国造), who ruled a territory centered on what is now the city of Iyo and town of Masaki with Kumi Province, Kazehaya Province, Touma Province, and Koichi Province each ruled by its own kuni no miyatsuko. The Geiyo Islands in the Seto Inland Sea were considered part of Aki Province into the Edo Period. During the Heian period, the coastal areas of the province were part of the stronghold of Fujiwara no Sumitomo, who led a rebellion against Imperial authority. During the Muromachi period, a branch of the Saionji family was appointed as shugo by the Ashikaga shogunate, but was constantly being invaded his more powerful and aggressive neighbors. The Saionji survived by the fluid loyalties and fierce resistance, but were eventually overcome by Chōsokabe Motochika, who was in turn overthrown by the forces of Toyotomi Hideyoshi. Under the Tokugawa shogunate, the province was divided into several feudal domains.

Bakumatsu period domains
Name	Clan	Type	kokudaka
Iyo-Matsuyama Domain	Hisamatsu-Matsudaira clan	Shinpan	150,000 koku
Uwajima Domain	Date clan	Tozama	100,000 koku
Iyo-Yoshida Domain	Date clan	Tozama	30,000 koku
Ōzu Domain	Katō clan	Tozama	66,000 koku
Niiya Domain	Katō clan	Tozama	10,000 koku
Imabari Domain	Hisamatsu-Matsudaira clan	Fudai	35,000 koku
Saijō Domain	Matsudaira clan	Shinpan	30,000 koku
Komatsu Domain	Hitotsuyanagi clan	Tozama	10,000 koku

Per the early Meiji period Kyudaka kyuryo Torishirabe-chō (旧高旧領取調帳), an official government assessment of the nation’s resources, the province had 964 villages with a total kokudaka of 434,408 koku. Iyo Province consisted of the following districts:

Districts of Iyo Province
District	kokudaka	villages	status	Currently
Uma (宇摩郡)	22,364 koku	56 villages	Tenryō (18); Imabari (18), Saijō (11), Tenryō/Saijō (4), Tenryō/Imabari (1)	Dissolved, now Saijō, Shikoku-chūō
Nii (新居郡)	36,694 koku	53 villages	Tenryō (6); Komatsu (4), Saijō (43),	Dissolved; now Saijō, Niihama
Shūfu (周敷郡)	23,142 koku	38 villages	Iyo-Matsuyama (25), Komatsu (9), Saijō (2), Matsuyama/Komatsu (1), Komatsu/Saijō (1)	Dissolved; now Saijō, Tōon
Kuwamura (桑村郡)	14,650 koku	29 villages	Tenryō (4); Iyo-Matsuyama (23); Tenryō/Matsuyama (1)	Dissolved; now Saijō
Ochi (越智郡)	46,790 koku	106 villages	Tenryō (8); Imabari (83); Iyo-Matsuyama (17)	merged into Ōchi District on April 18, 1896, now Imabari, Kamijima
Noma (野間郡)	16,587 koku	29 villages	Iyo-Matsuyama (29)	merged into Ōchi District on April 18, 1896; now Imabari
Kazahaya (風早郡)	18,351 koku	84 villages	Tenryō (2); Iyo-Matsuyama (78); Ozu (4); Matsuyama/Ozu (1)	Dissolved, now Matsuyama
Wake (和気郡)	16,345 koku	25 villages	Iyo-Matsuyama (25)	Dissolved, now Matsuyama
Onsen (温泉郡)	22,824 koku	36 villages	Iyo-Matsuyama (36)	Dissolved, now Matsuyama, Toon
Kume (久米郡)	17,554 koku	32 villages	Iyo-Matsuyama (32)	Dissolved, now Matsuyama, Toon
Ukena (浮穴郡)	38,834 koku	102 villages	Iyo-Matsuyama (48); Ozu (46), Niiya (7); Matsuyama/Ozu (1); Ozu/Niiya (1)	Ozu, Seiyo, Uchiko, Iyo, Matsuyama, Toon, Tobe
Iyo (伊予郡)	27,949 koku	41 villages	Iyo-Matsuyama (22); Ozu (18), Niiya (2); Matsuyama/Ozu (1); Ozu/Niiya (1)	Masaki, Tobe, Iyo
Kita (喜多郡)	33,491 koku	83 villages	Ozu (82), Niiya (4);	Ozu, Iyo, Seiyo, Naishi
Uwa (宇和郡)	98,828 koku	250 villages	Uwajima (140), Iyo-Yoshida (72);	Uwajima, Seiyo, Ozu, Naishi

Following the abolition of the han system in 1871, Iyo Province became Ehime Prefecture.

== Gallery ==
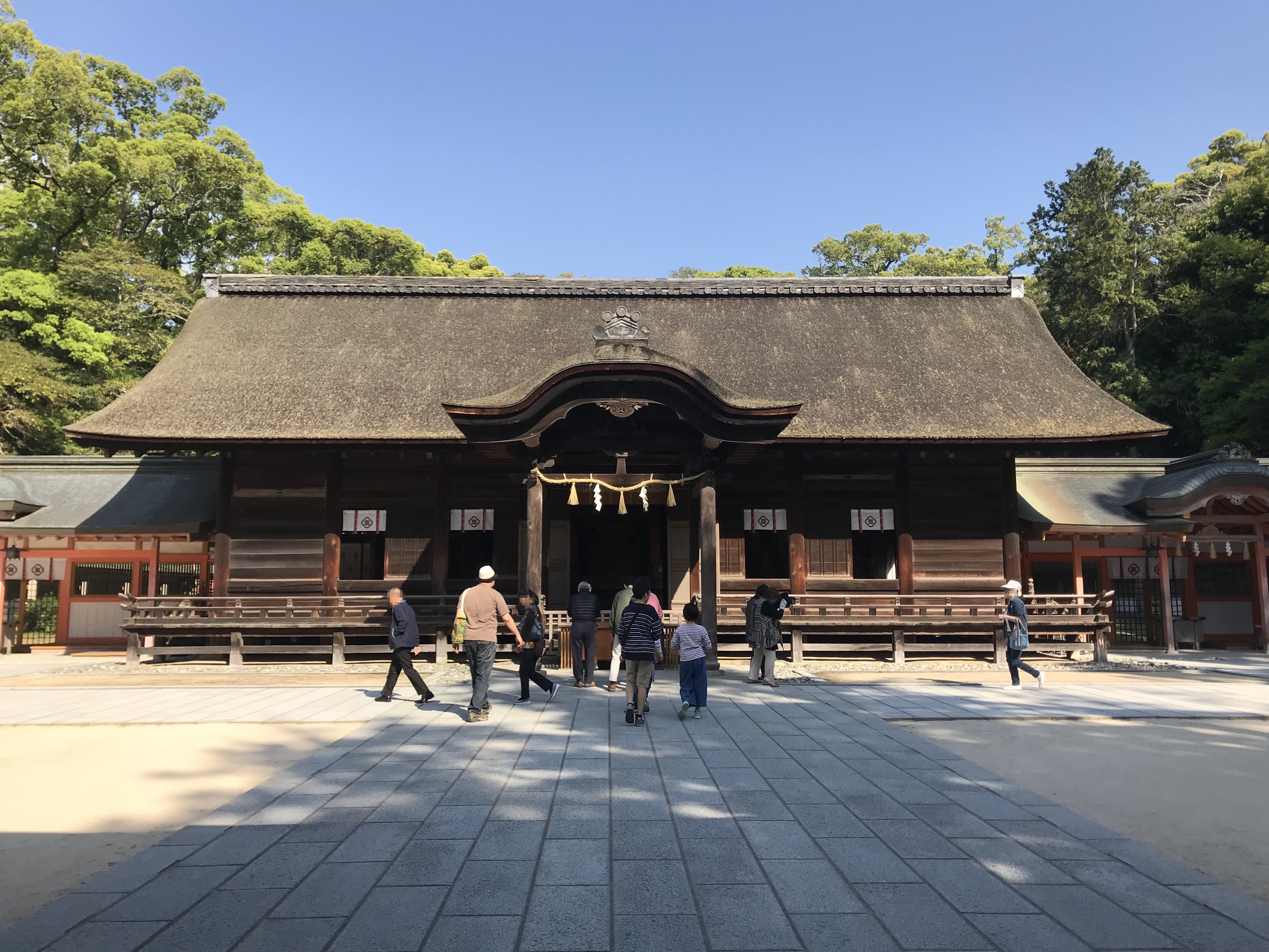
Ōyamazumi Jinja, the ichinomiya of the province

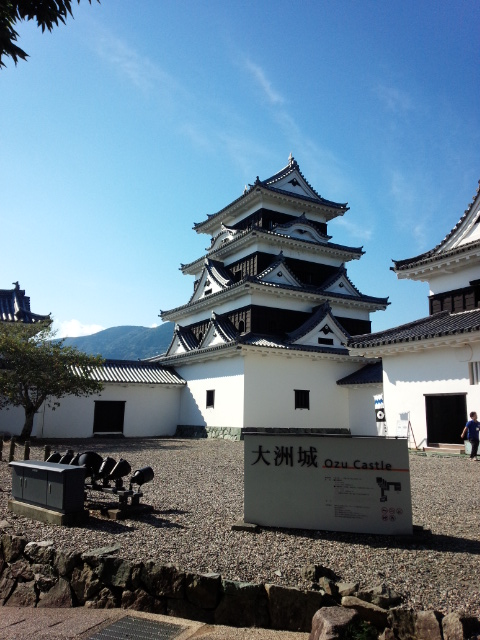
Ōzu Castle

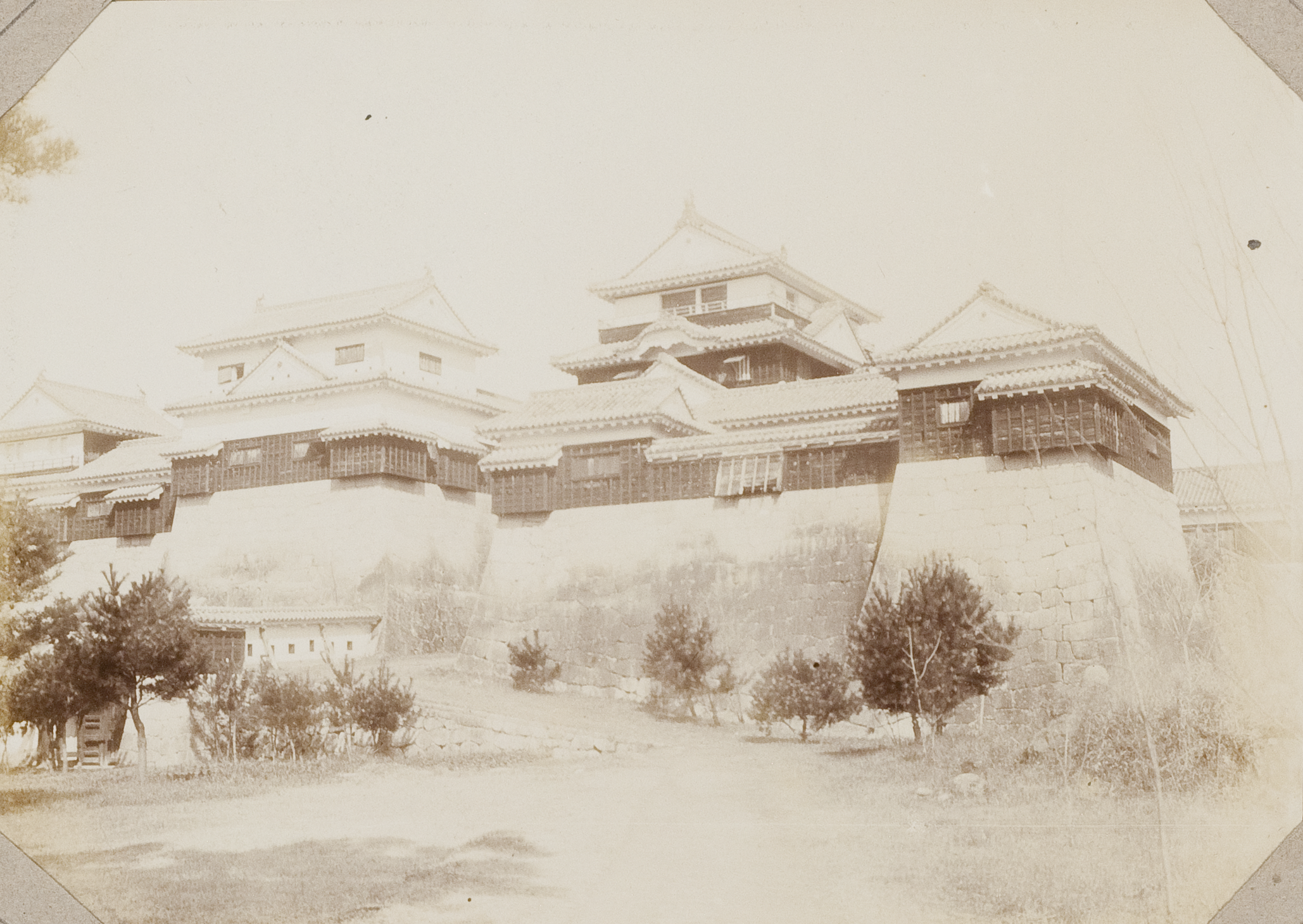
Matsuyama Castle, circa 1900-1902

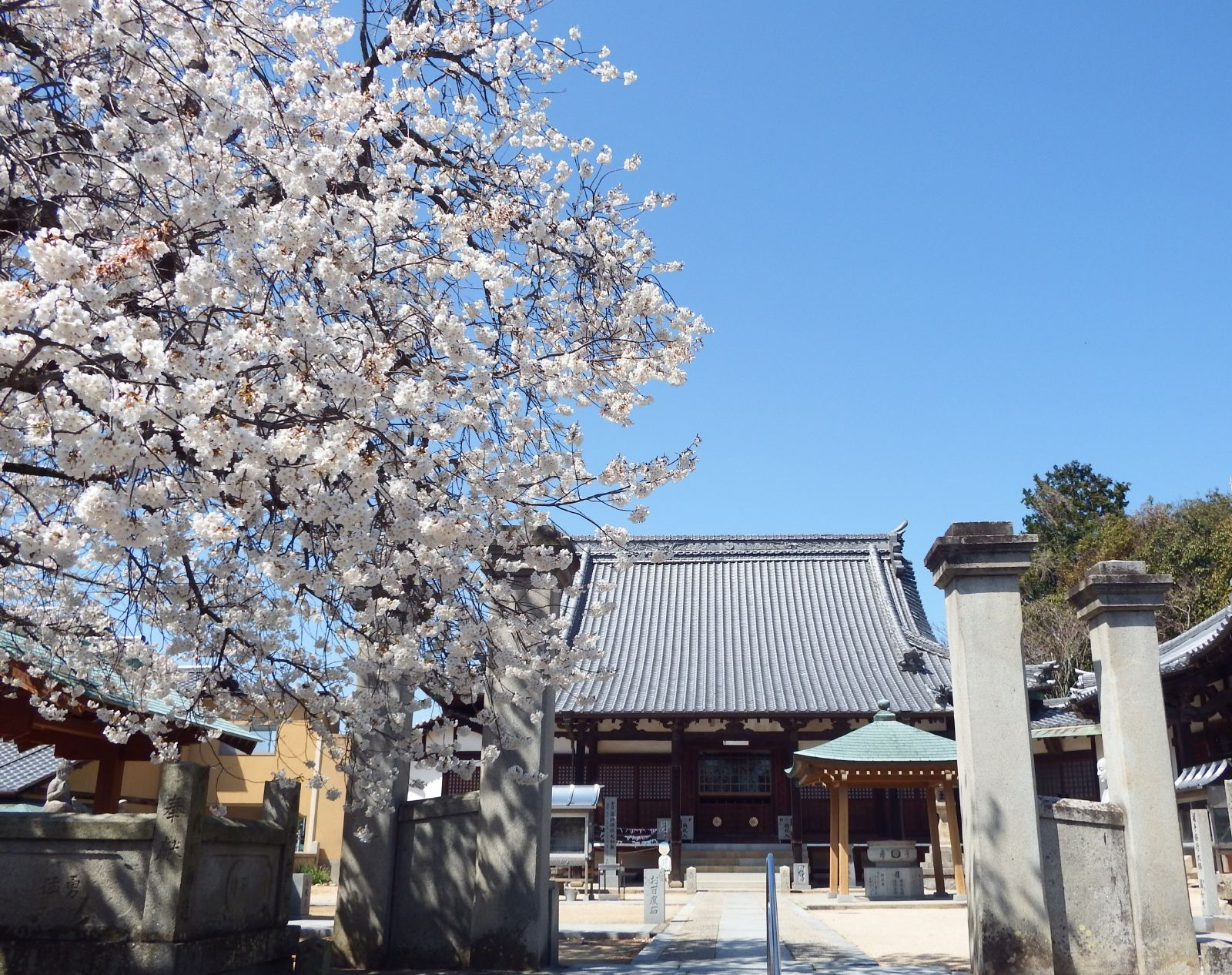
Iyo Kokubun-ji
