= Iyo District, Ehime =

District in Ehime prefecture, Japan

Coordinates: 33°43′41″N 132°46′59″E

Iyo (伊予郡, Iyo-gun) is a district located in Ehime Prefecture, Japan. The district contains two towns: Masaki and Tobe. As of 2004 the estimated population is 52,832 with a total area of 121.89 km^{2}.

== History ==
In 1887, the villages of Habu and Yodo were reassigned from Iyo District to the Onsen District (now part of the city of Matsuyama).

In 1889, the village of Nakayama, originally in Kita District, was moved to the Shimoukena District. The village of Kurita merged into the village of Hirota within the Shimoukena District.

In 1896, several villages, including Haramachi, Tobe, Hirota, Nakayama, Izubuchi, Saredani, Kaminada, and Shimonada, were reassigned from the Shimoukena District to the Iyo District. This reorganization resulted in one town and fifteen villages.

On January 1, 1907, the village of Izubuchi merged into the village of Nakayama, reducing the count to one town and twelve villages.

On September 30, 1908, parts of the village of Shimonada were incorporated into the village of Michiho (now the town of Uchiko) in the Kita District.

On September 3, 1921, the village of Kaminada gained town status, resulting in two towns and thirteen villages.

On October 31, 1922, the village of Masaki achieved town status, bringing the total to three towns and twelve villages.

On April 1, 1925, portions of the village of Kaminada merged into the village of Minamiyamasaki. The village of Nakayama attained town status, resulting in four towns and eleven villages.

On November 10, 1928, the village of Tobe gained town status, increasing the count to five towns and ten villages.

On March 15, 1929, parts of the village of Hirota (formerly the Kurita area) merged into the town of Nakayama

On January 1, 1940, the village of Gunchū merged into the town of Gunchū, leaving five towns and nine villages.

On January 1, 1955, the villages of Minamiyamasaki, Kitayamasaki, Minamiiyo, and the town of Gunchū combined to form the city of Iyo, resulting in four towns and six villages.

On February 1, 1955, the village of Saredani merged into the town of Nakayama, maintaining four towns and five villages.

On March 31, 1955, the village of Haramachi merged into the town of Tobe, leaving four towns and four villages. The villages of Kitaiyo and Okada merged into the town of Masaki, resulting in four towns and two villages. The town of Kaminada and the village of Shimonada combined to form the town of Futami, with four towns and one village.

On November 1, 1958, parts of the city of Iyo merged into the town of Tobe.

On January 1, 2005, the village of Hirota merged into the town of Tobe, resulting in a total of four towns.

On April 1, 2005, the towns of Nakayama and Futami combined to form the city of Iyo, resulting in a total of two towns.

=== Historical significance ===
The district is home to ancient temples, shrines, and historic landmarks. Notable sites include Iyo-Mishima Shrine, Tobe Zoological Park, and Masaki Castle Ruins. Iyo District preserves traditional crafts like Iyo Kasuri, a distinctive textile weaving technique. Here, local artisans create beautiful fabrics using intricate patterns.

The district’s scenic landscapes, including Mt. Ishizuchi, Japan’s highest peak in western Shikoku, attract nature enthusiasts. Cherry blossoms, lush forests, and serene rivers are among the area's notable natural features, while local traditions are celebrated through events such as the Iyo Taisai Festival, which features processions, music, and dance.

== Notable people ==
- Masanobu Fukuoka (1913-2008), Japanese farmer, philosopher, and author.
- Daichi Kamada (born 1996), Japanese professional footballer.
