= Honshu-Shikoku Bridge Expressway Company =

Japanese transport company

Logo

The Honshu-Shikoku Bridge Expressway Company Limited (本州四国連絡高速道路株式会社, Honshū-shikoku-renraku-kōsoku-dōro-kabushikigaisha), abbreviated as JB本四高速 (JB honshi-kōsoku, with "JB" stands for "Japan Bridge") in Japanese or HSBE in English, operates the Kobe-Awaji-Naruto, Nishiseto, and Seto-Chūō expressways and their respective bridges between the islands of Honshu and Shikoku, Japan. It is headquartered in Chūō-ku, Kōbe, Hyōgo Prefecture.

The company was established on October 1, 2005 as a result of the privatization of its predecessor, the Honshu-Shikoku Bridge Authority, itself a successor to the Japan Highway Public Corporation. The company is responsible for maintaining the three expressways and bridge systems between Honshu and Shikoku, as well as the management of the Seto-Ōhashi railway line.

== Bridges ==
- Akashi-Kaikyō Bridge
- Ōnaruto Bridge
- Shimotsui-Seto Bridge
- Hitsuishijima Bridge
- Yoshima Bridge
- Kita Bisan-Seto Bridge
- Shin-Onomichi Bridge
- Innoshima Bridge
- Ikuchi Bridge
- Tatara Bridge
- Ōmishima Bridge
- Hakata-Ōshima Bridge
- Kurushima-Kaikyō Bridge
