= Hakata–Ōshima Bridge =

Hakata-Ōshima Bridge (伯方・大島大橋, Hakata Ōshima Ō-hashi)
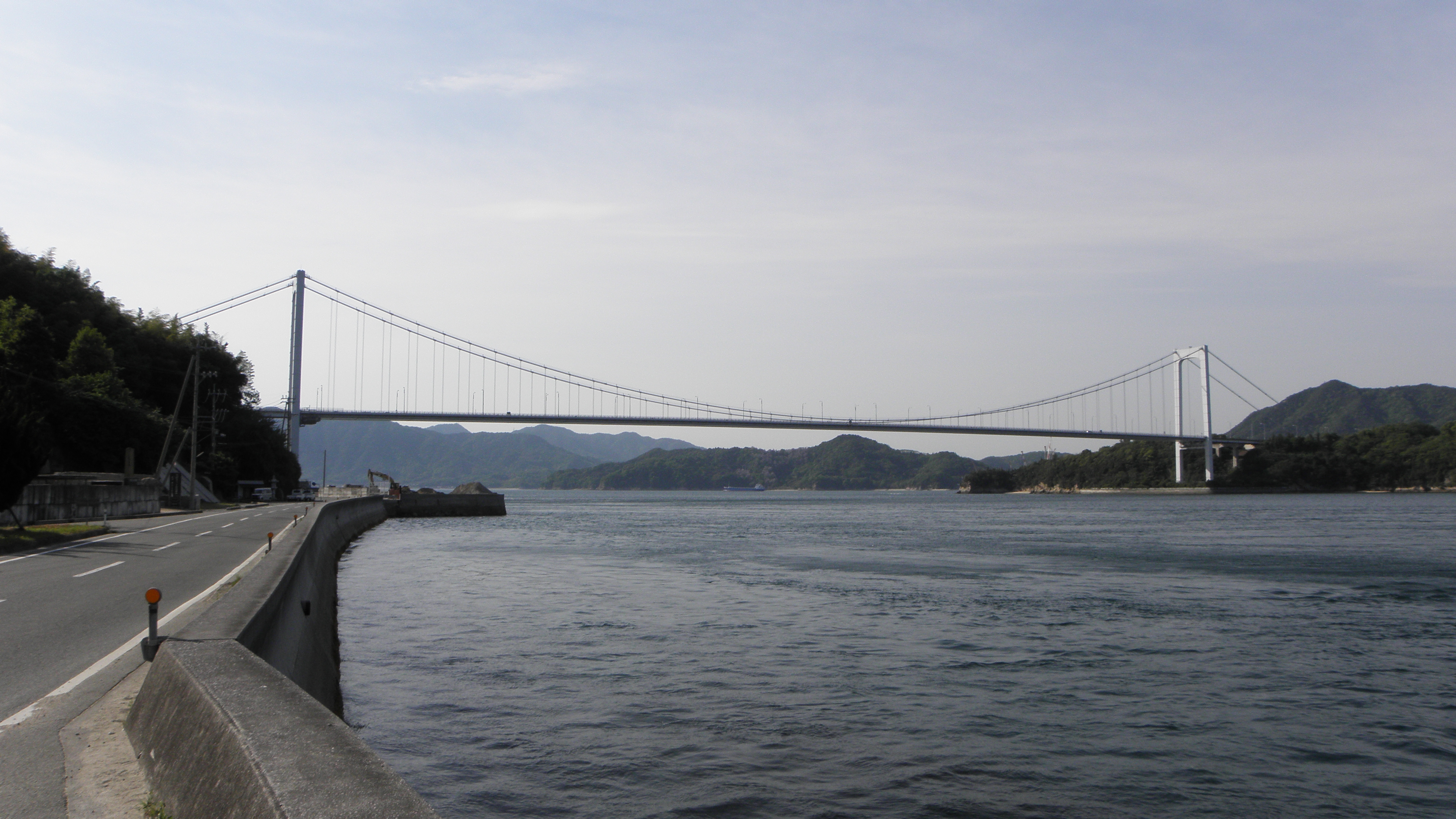
- Coordinates: 34°11′37″N 133°04′27″E
- Carries: 4 lanes of roadway
- Crosses: Seto Inland Sea
- Locale: Hakatajima and Ōshima
- Maintained by: Honshū-Shikoku Bridge Authority

Characteristics
- Design: Suspension bridge
- Total length: 840 metres (2,756 ft)
- Longest span: 560 metres (1,837 ft)

History
- Opened: 1988

Location
- Interactive map of Hakata-Ōshima Bridge (伯方・大島大橋, Hakata Ōshima Ō-hashi)

The Hakata–Ōshima Bridge (伯方・大島大橋, Hakata Ōshima Ōhashi) is a Japanese suspension bridge, part of the 59 kilometer Nishiseto Expressway connecting the islands of Honshū and Shikoku. Completed in 1988, it has a main span of 560 meters and connects Hakatajima with Ōshima. The expressway connects seven small islands and also includes several other long span bridges including the Tatara Bridge, the Innoshima Bridge, and the Kurushima-Kaikyō Bridge.
