= Great Seto Bridge =

Major bridge connecting Honshū and Shikoku

Great Seto Bridge (瀬戸大橋, Seto Ōhashi)
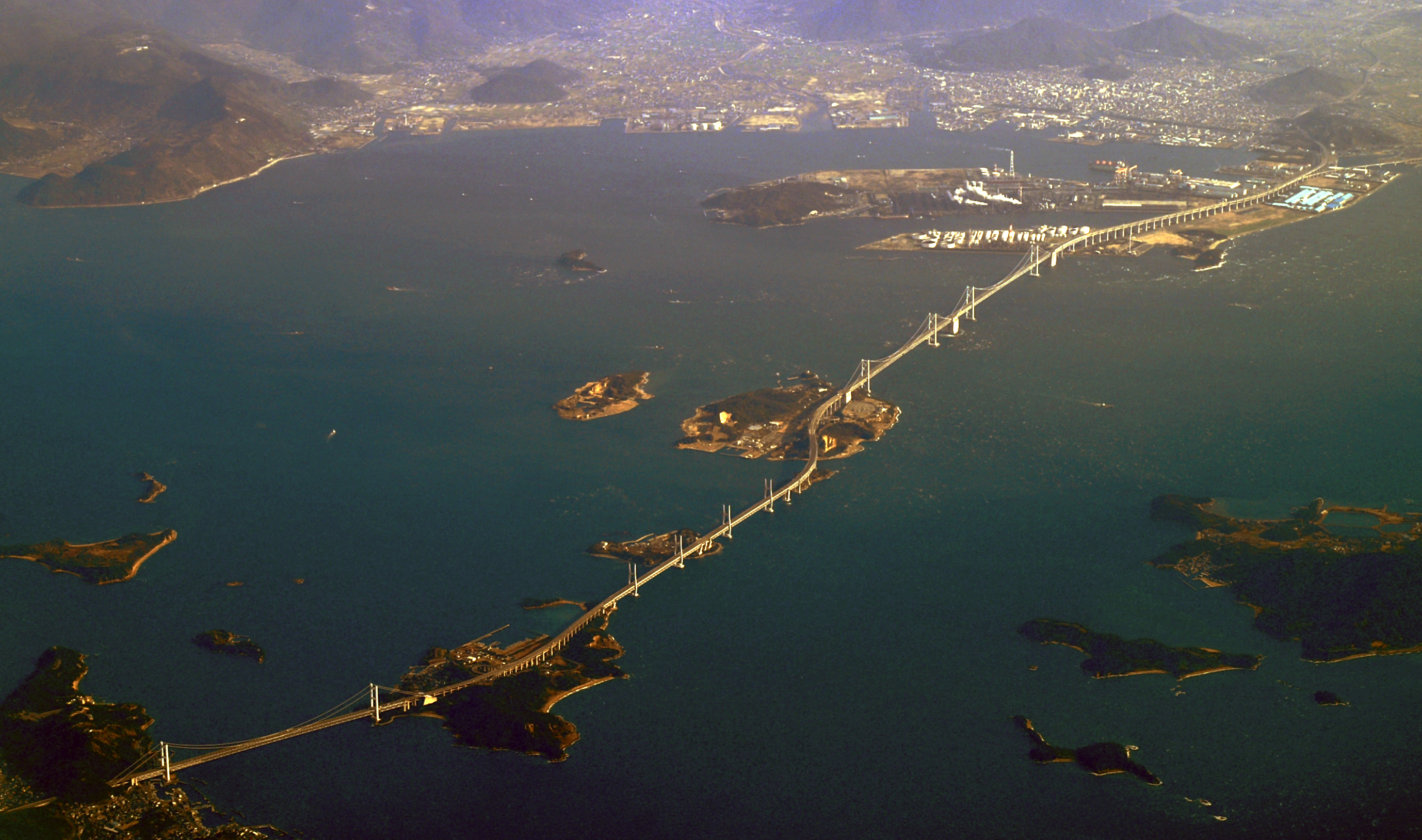
- Great Seto Bridge from Honshū (left) via the islands of Hitsuishijima and Yoshima to Shikoku
- Coordinates: 34°23′54″N 133°48′36″E
- Carries: Upper: 4 lanes of Seto-Chūō Expressway; Lower: 2 tracks of the Seto-Ōhashi Line
- Crosses: Seto Inland Sea
- Locale: Honshū and Shikoku
- Maintained by: Honshu-Shikoku Bridge Expressway Company

Characteristics
- Design: Double-decked bridge system
- Total length: 13.1 km (8.1 mi)

History
- Opened: April 10, 1988; 38 years ago

Location
- Interactive map of Great Seto Bridge (瀬戸大橋, Seto Ōhashi)

The Great Seto Bridge or Seto Ohashi Bridge (瀬戸大橋, Seto Ōhashi) (Note: "Seto-Ohashi" is the term used on e.g. Google Maps) is a series of double deck bridges connecting Okayama and Kagawa prefectures in Japan across a series of five small islands in the Seto Inland Sea. Built over the period 1978–1988, it is one of the three routes of the Honshū–Shikoku Bridge Project connecting Honshū and Shikoku islands and the only one to carry rail traffic. The total length is 13.1 kilometers (8.1 mi), and the longest span, the Minami Bisan–Seto Bridge, is 1.1 kilometers (3,600 ft). The crossing takes about 20 minutes by car or train. The ferry crossing before the bridge was built took about an hour.

The bridges carry two lanes of highway traffic in each direction (Seto-Chūō Expressway) on the upper deck and one railway track in each direction (Seto-Ōhashi Line) on the lower deck. The lower deck was designed to accommodate an additional set of tracks for the proposed Shikoku Shinkansen line.

== History ==
Green: Great Seto Bridge Yellow: Kobe-Awaji-Naruto Expressway Red: Nishiseto Expressway

When in 1889 the first railway in Shikoku was completed between Marugame and Kotohira, a member of the Prefectural Parliament, Jinnojo Ōkubo (大久保諶之丞, Ōkubo Jinnojo; 1849–1891), stated in his speech at the opening ceremony: "The four provinces of Shikoku are like so many remote islands. If united by roads, they will be much better off, enjoying the benefits of increased transportation and easier communication with each other."

While it took a century for this vision of a bridge across the Seto Inland Sea to become reality, another of Ōkubo's ideas, mentioned in a drinking song he composed, was accomplished twenty years sooner:

I'll tell you, dear, don't laugh at me,
a hundred years from now, I'll be seeing you
flying to and from the moon in a space ship.
Its port, let me tell you, dear,
will be that mountaintop over there!

The bridge idea lay dormant for about sixty years. In 1955, after 171 people, including 100 students from elementary and junior high schools on school trips, died when two ferries collided in dense fog off the coast of Takamatsu, a safer crossing was deemed necessary. By 1959, meetings were held to promote building the bridge. Scientists began investigations shortly after, and in 1970, the Honshu-Shikoku Bridge Construction Authority was inaugurated. However, work was postponed for five years by the "1973 oil shock"; once the Environment Assessment Report was published in 1978, construction got underway. The ferry disaster also led to the creation of the Akashi Kaikyō Bridge.

The project took ten years to complete at a cost of US$7 billion; 3.646 million cubic meters (128.8 million cubic feet) of concrete and 705,000 tons of steel were used in construction. Although nets, ropes and other safety measures were employed, 17 workers were killed during the 10 years of construction.

The bridge opened to road and rail traffic on April 10, 1988 by then-Crown Prince Akihito. At opening time, the one-way toll to cross the bridge was ¥ 6300.

== Constituent bridges ==
Six of the eleven bridges are separately named, unlike some other long bridge complexes such as the San Francisco–Oakland Bay Bridge. The other five bridges are viaducts. The six named bridges from north to south are listed below.

Shimotsui–Seto Bridge
The Shimotsui–Seto Bridge (34°25′51″N 133°48′22.4″E 下津井瀬戸大橋, Shimotsui Seto Ō-hashi) is a double-decked suspension bridge with a center span of 940 meters (3,080 ft) and a total length of 1,400 meters (4,600 ft) which connects Honshū with the island of Hitsuishijima. It is the 45th largest suspension bridge in the world. It is the northernmost bridge of the Seto-Chuo Expressway.
Hitsuishijima Bridge
The Hitsuishijima Bridge (34°24′35″N 133°48′25.6″E 櫃石島橋, Hitsuishijima-kyō) is a double-decked cable-stayed bridge with a center span of 420 meters (1,380 ft) and a total length of 790 meters (2,590 ft). It is immediately north of the identical Iwakurojima Bridge.
Iwakurojima Bridge
The Iwakurojima Bridge (34°24′06.3″N 133°48′33″E 岩黒島橋, Iwakurojima-kyō) is a double-decked cable-stayed bridge with a center span of 420 meters (1,380 ft) and a total length of 790 meters (2,590 ft). It is immediately south of the identical Hitsuishijima Bridge.
Yoshima Bridge
The Yoshima Bridge (34°23′37.2″N 133°48′45.2″E 与島橋, Yoshima-kyō) is a continuous double-decked truss bridge with a main span of 246 meters (807 ft) and a total of five spans with a length of 847 meters (2,779 ft). It is immediately south of the Hitsuishijima and Iwakurojima Bridges.
Kita Bisan–Seto Bridge
The Kita Bisan–Seto Bridge (34°23′43.5″N 133°49′13.7″E 北備讃瀬戸大橋, Kita Bisan Seto Ō-hashi) is a double-decked suspension bridge with two sections linked by a common anchorage between them. The center span is 990 meters (3,248 ft) and the total length is 1,538 m (5,046 ft). It is the 19th largest suspension bridge in the world. The nearly identical Minami Bisan Seto Bridge is located immediately to the south.
Minami Bisan–Seto Bridge
The Minami Bisan–Seto Bridge (34°21′51″N 133°49′31″E 南備讃瀬戸大橋, Minami Bisan Seto Ō-hashi) is a double-decked suspension bridge with a center span of 1,100 meters (3,609 ft) and a total length of 1,648 m (5,407 ft). It is the 13th longest suspension bridge span in the world. It is the southernmost part of the Great Seto Bridge. The roadway of the bridge is 93 meters (305 ft) above sea level.

Views from outside and riding on the Great Seto Bridge, 2017

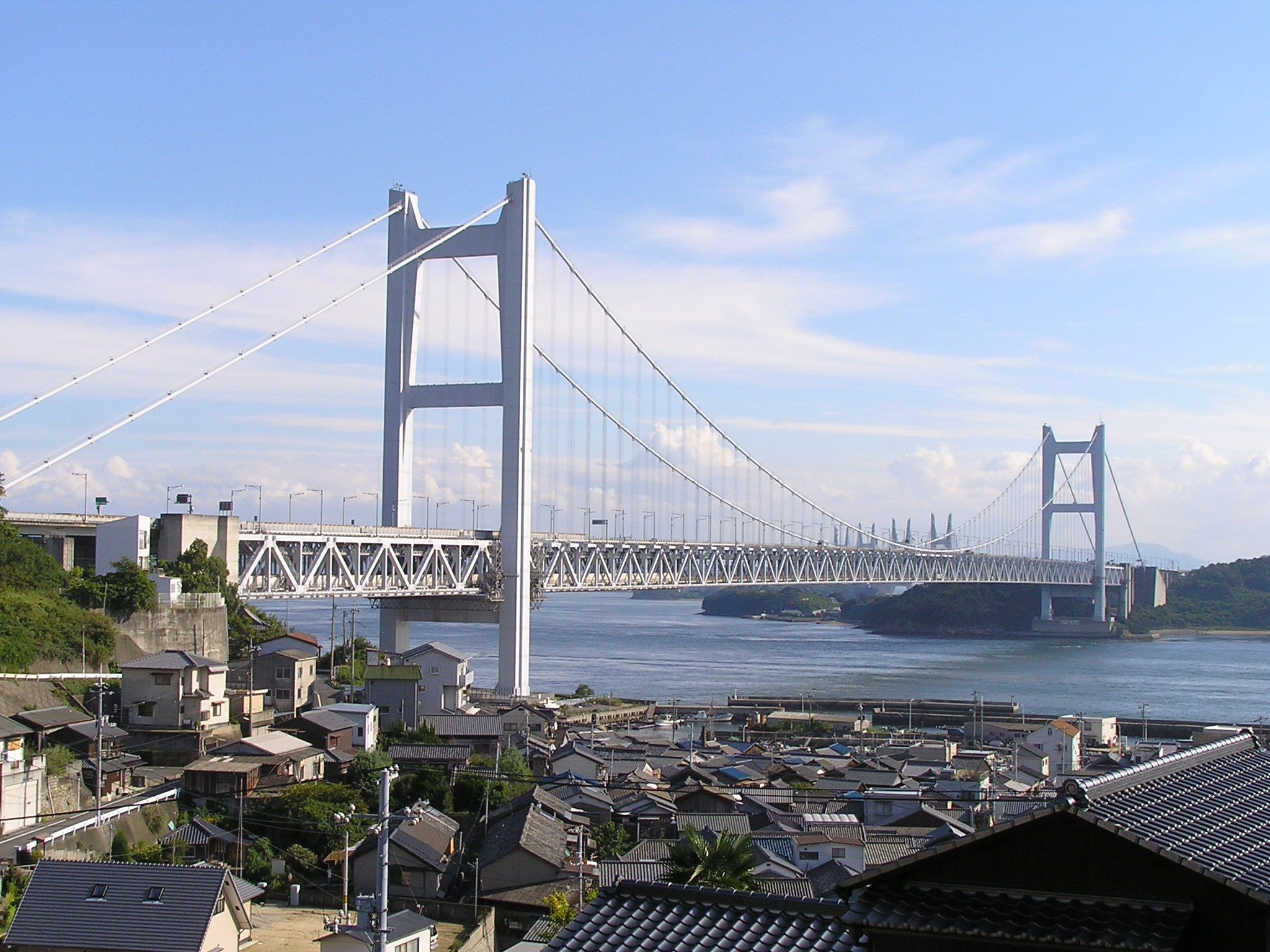
Shimotsui–Seto Bridge

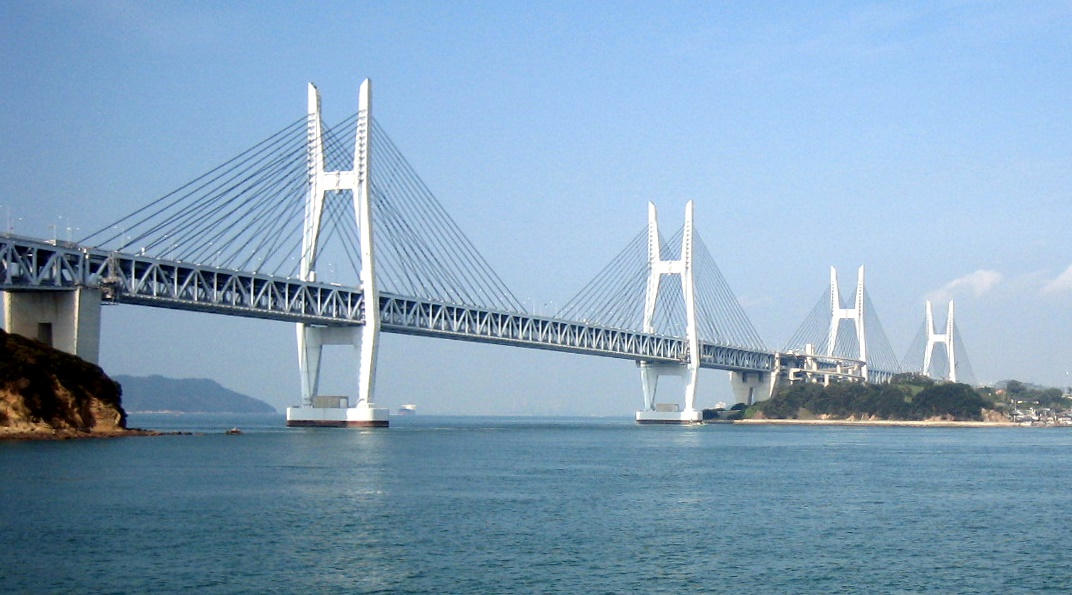
Hitsuishijima Bridge (far) and Iwakurojima Bridge (near)

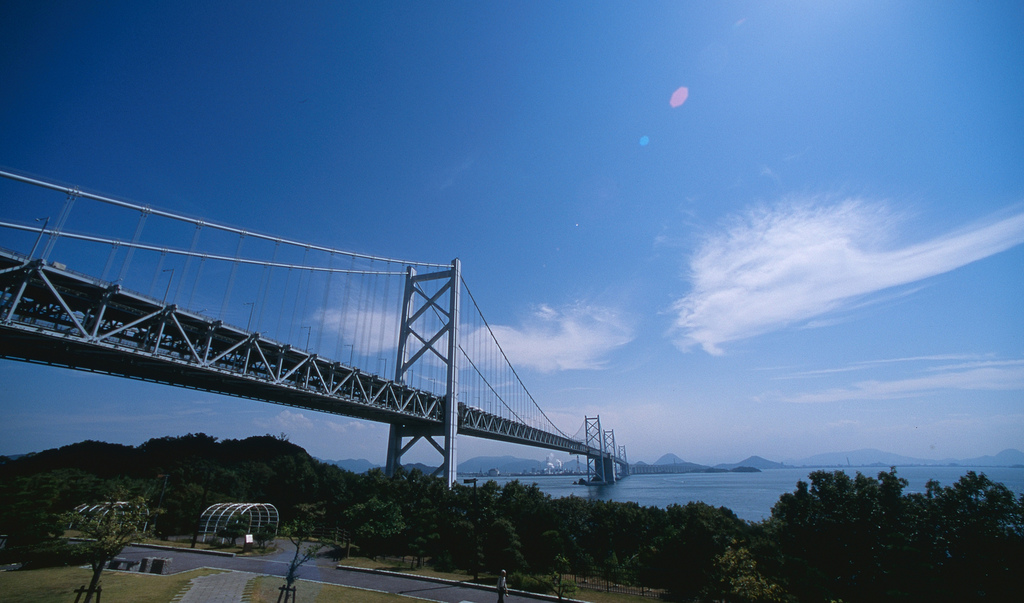
The Kita Bisan–Seto Bridge seen from Yoshima Island

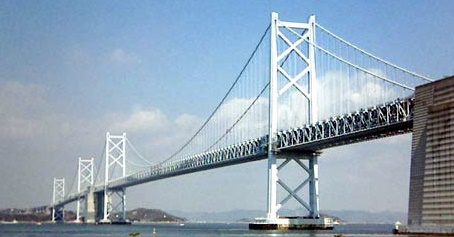
The Minami Bisan–Seto Bridge (near) and the Kita Bisan–Seto Bridge (far)

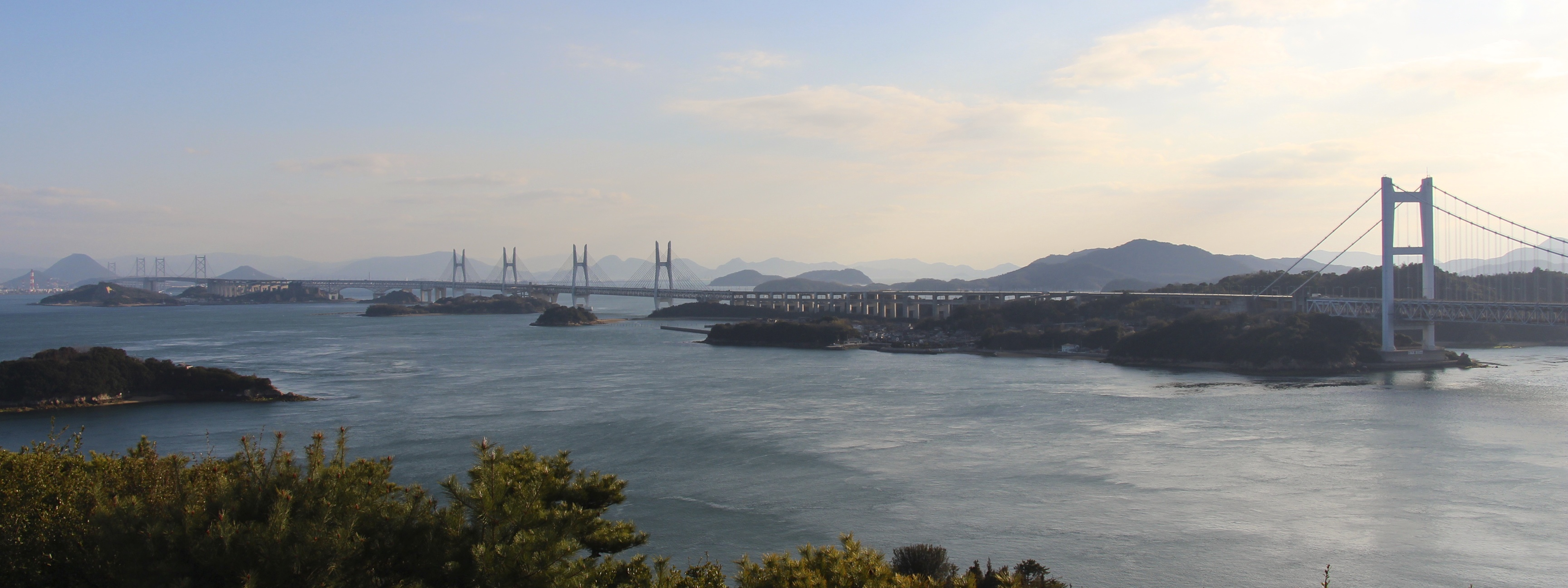
Panoramic View from North side

== Sister bridges ==
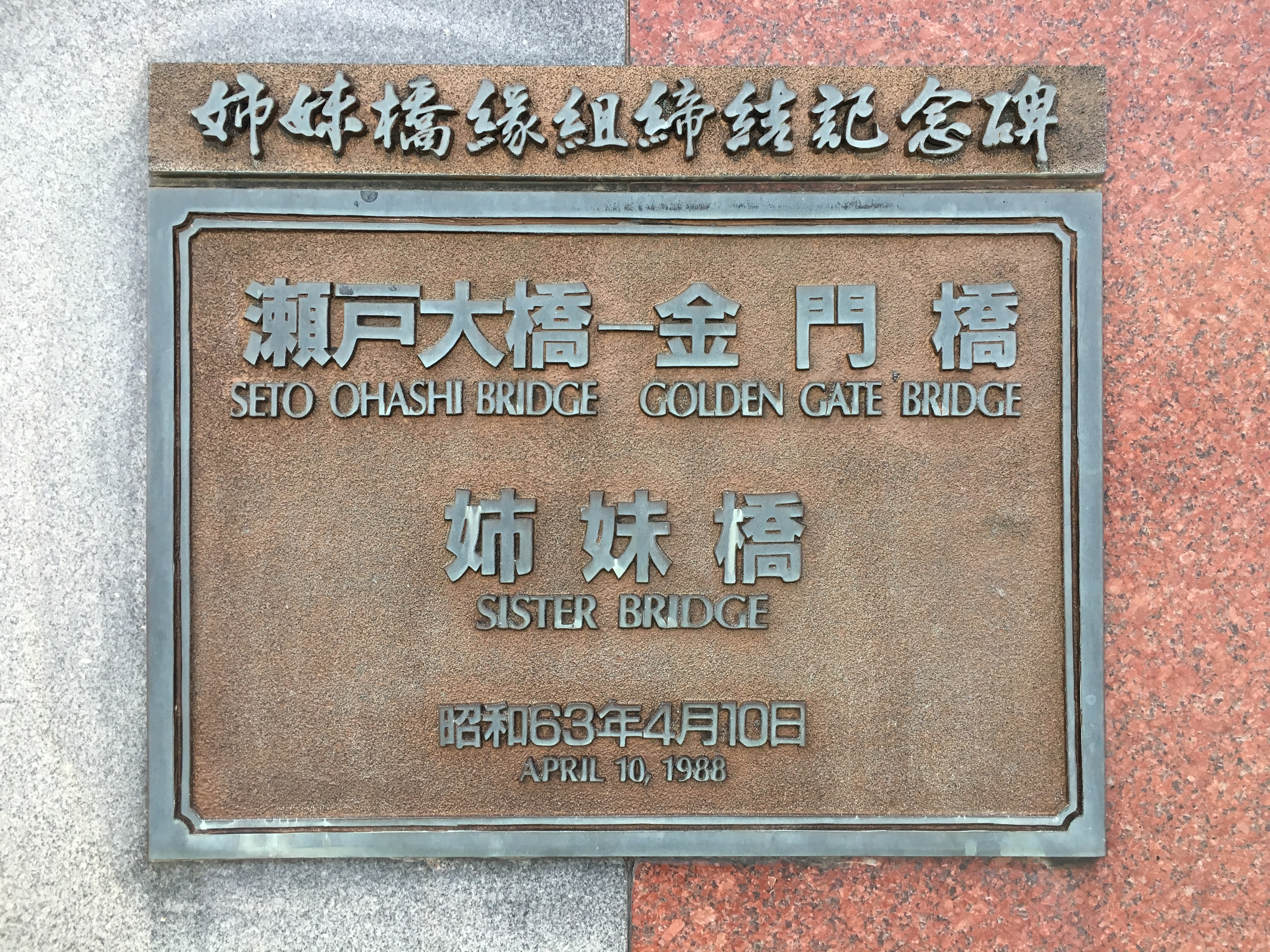
A plaque denoting the "Sister Bridge" friendship between the Great Seto Bridge and the Golden Gate Bridge in San Francisco, California, United States

- Golden Gate Bridge, San Francisco, California, United States
  - Affiliated from April 5, 1988
- Fatih Sultan Mehmet Bridge, Istanbul, Turkey
  - Affiliated from July 3, 1988
- Øresund Bridge, Malmo, Sweden and Copenhagen, Denmark
  - Affiliated from May 24, 2008

== See also ==
- Honshū–Shikoku Bridge Project, three routes connecting Honshu and Shikoku
  - Akashi Kaikyō Bridge
  - Kurushima Kaikyō Bridge
- List of largest suspension bridges
- List of largest cable-stayed bridges
- Mount Washu, viewpoint of the Great Seto Bridge
- Tsing Ma Bridge, which has the longest road-rail span in the world
