= Honshū–Shikoku Bridge Project =

System of bridges

Locations of Honshu-Shikoku Bridge Project Expressways

The Honshu-Shikoku Bridge Project (本州四国連絡橋, Honshū-Shikoku Renraku-kyō) is a system of bridges connecting the islands of Honshu and Shikoku across the Inland Sea of Japan, which were previously only connected by ferry. It consists of three major connections. All bridges are now controlled by the Honshu-Shikoku Bridge Expressway Company and the Japan Expressway Holding and Debt Repayment Agency (日本高速道路保有・債務返済機構). The system consists of three expressways and their respective bridge systems.

== Kobe-Awaji-Naruto Expressway ==
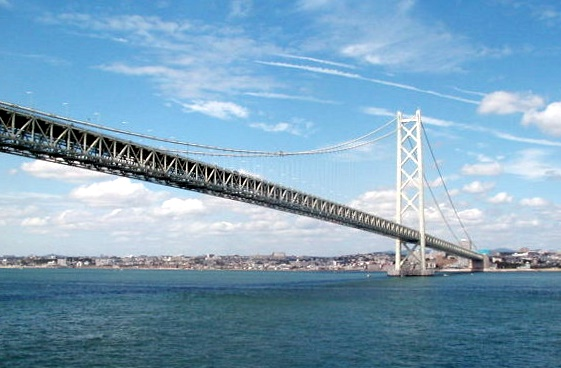
Akashi-Kaikyo Bridge

The eastern expressway was completed in 1998. Crossing the Akashi Strait, this connection links Hyōgo Prefecture on Honshu with Tokushima Prefecture on Shikoku, using Awaji Island for most of its length. The route connects to the Sanyō Expressway at its northern terminus, allowing traffic to connect to Himeji, Kobe, and other major cities on Honshū.

This connection uses three suspension bridges. The Akashi Kaikyō Bridge was the world's longest suspension bridge at the time of its construction in 1998, and connects Kobe to Awaji Island (Awaji, Hyogo). The others are the Ōnaruto Bridge, connecting Awaji to Ōge Island (Naruto, Tokushima) across the Naruto Strait, and the Muya Bridge connecting Ōge Island with Shikoku.

Although the connection was initially designed to accommodate railway service as well as road traffic, economic considerations turned it into a road connection only.

== Seto-Chūō Expressway ==
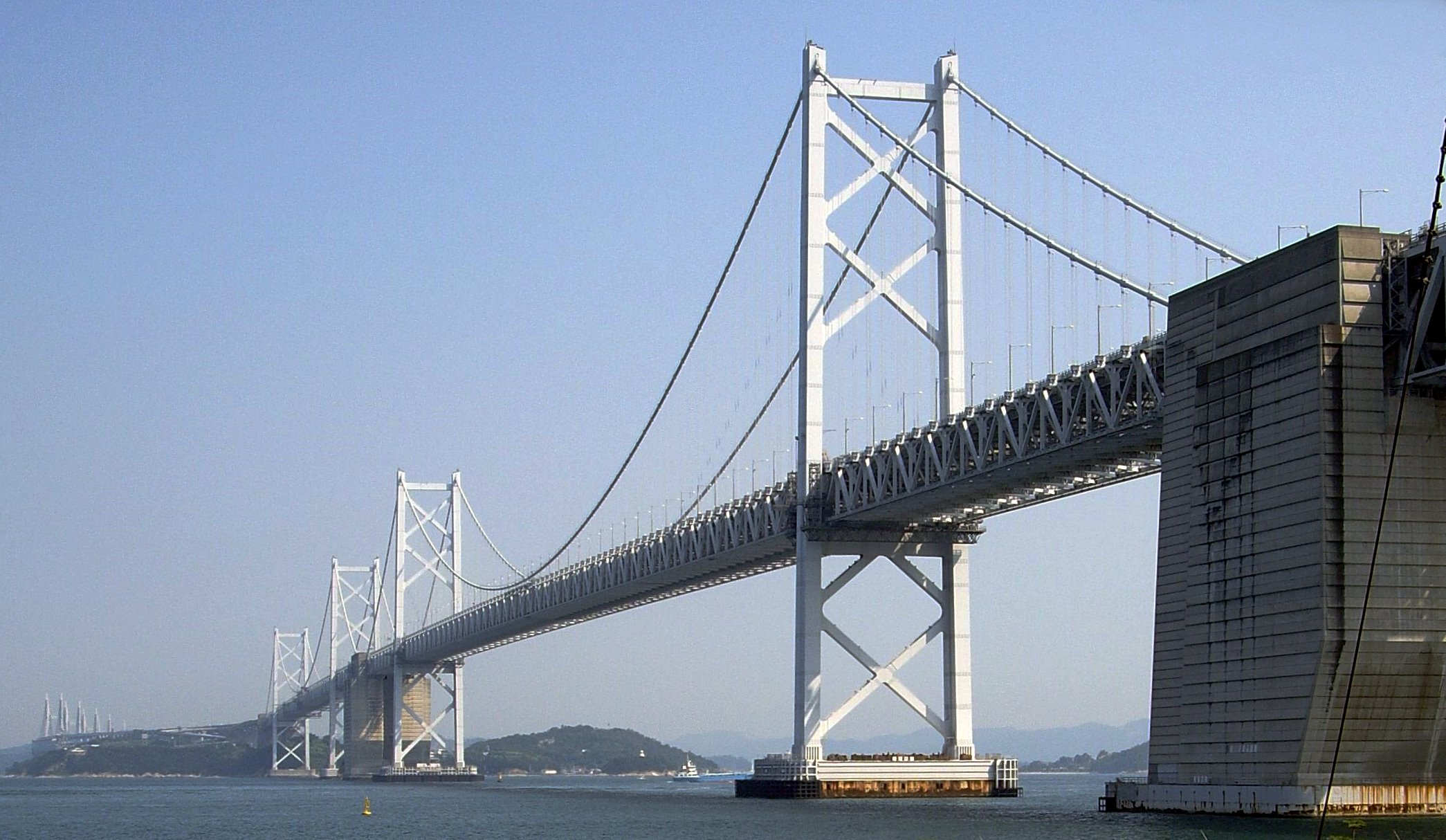
Great Seto Bridge

The central expressway was completed in 1988. Also known as the Great Seto Bridge, this line connects Okayama Prefecture to Kagawa Prefecture. A series of six major bridges and five viaducts are used. The six bridges are the Shimotsui-Seto Bridge, Hitsuishijima Bridge, the Iwakurojima Bridge, the Yoshima Bridge, the Kita Bisan-Seto Bridge, and the Minami Bisan-Seto Bridge.

The Seto-Chūō bridges are also used by JR trains (Seto-Ōhashi Line), and are designed to accommodate high-speed Shinkansen service in the future, although there are no current plans to extend the Shinkansen to Shikoku.

== Nishiseto Expressway ==
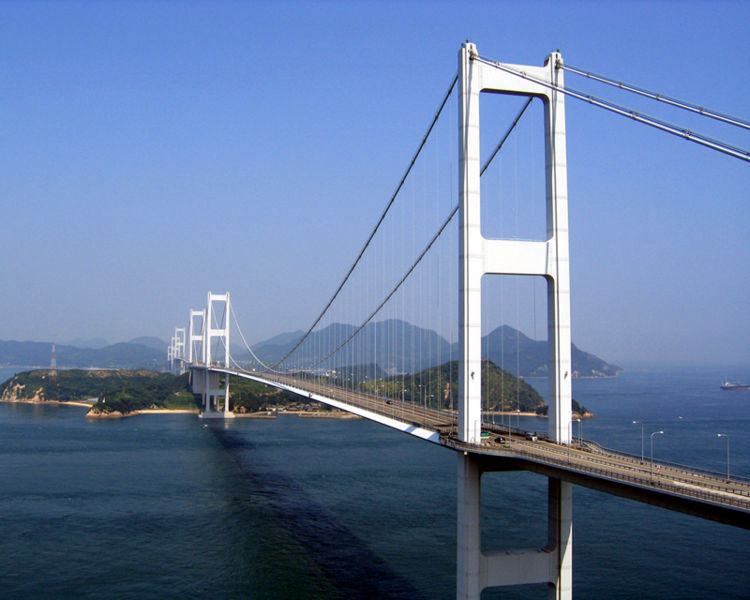
Kurushima-Kaikyo Bridge

The western expressway was completed in 1999. Commonly known as the Shimanami Kaidō, this connection links Hiroshima Prefecture to Ehime Prefecture. The link consists of nine bridges: the Shin-Onomichi Bridge, Innoshima Bridge, Ikuchi Bridge, Tatara Bridge, Ōmishima Bridge, Hakata-Ōshima Bridge, and the three-part Kurushima-Kaikyō Bridge. It is the only route that can be crossed on bicycle or by foot.

== See also ==
- Five Bridges of Amakusa
