= Satoshi Kashima =

Japanese civil engineer

Satoshi Kashima (加島 聰, Kashima Satoshi) is a Japanese civil engineer. He was lead designer/engineer of the longest suspension bridge in the world, the 3,911-meter Akashi Kaikyō Bridge (also known as the Pearl Bridge) located in Japan which was completed in 1998. He is executive director of the Japan Bridge Engineering Center.

He earned M.S. and Ph.D. degrees in civil engineering from the University of Texas's College of Engineering.
