= Innoshima Bridge =

Innoshima Bridge (因島大橋, Innoshima Ō-hashi)
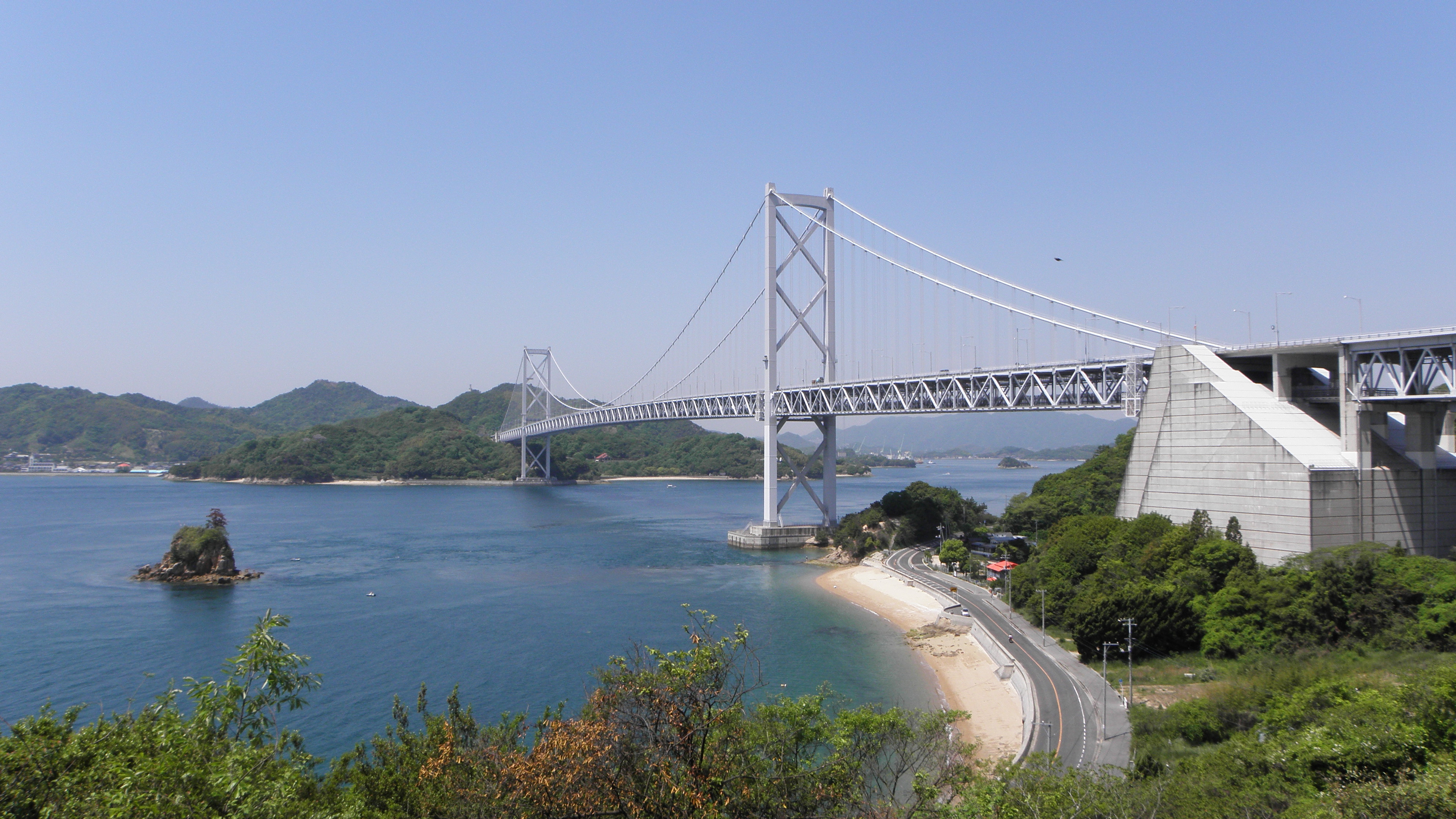
- Coordinates: 34°21′25″N 133°10′49″E
- Carries: 4 lanes of roadway bicycle/pedestrian lanes
- Crosses: Seto Inland Sea
- Locale: Mukaishima, Hiroshima with Innoshima, Hiroshima
- Maintained by: Honshū-Shikoku Bridge Authority

Characteristics
- Design: Suspension bridge
- Total length: 1,339 metres (4,393 ft)
- Longest span: 770 metres (2,526 ft)

History
- Construction cost: $285,000,000
- Opened: 1983

Location
- Interactive map of Innoshima Bridge (因島大橋, Innoshima Ō-hashi)

The Innoshima Bridge (因島大橋, Innoshima Ō-hashi) is a Japanese suspension bridge, part of the 59 kilometer Nishiseto Expressway linking the islands of Honshu and Shikoku. Completed in 1983, it has a main span of 770 metres (2,526 ft) and connects Mukaishima, Hiroshima with Innoshima, Hiroshima.
