= Ōge-jima =

Island in Naruto, Tokushima, Japan

Native name: 大毛島
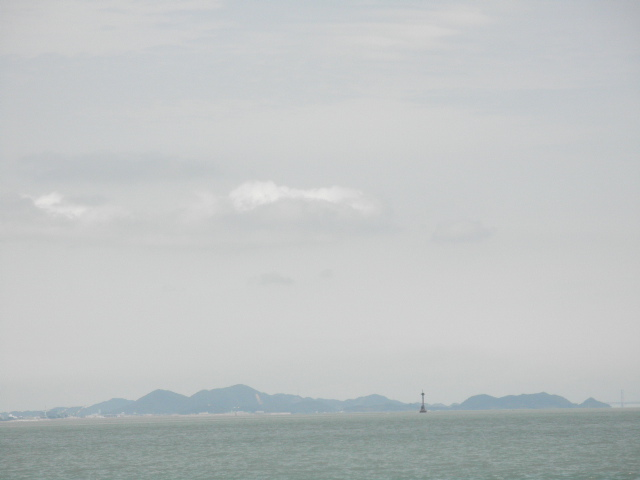

- Location within Tokushima Prefecture Location within Japan

Geography
- Location: Seto Inland Sea
- Coordinates: 34°13′0″N 134°37′30″E
- Archipelago: no
- Area: 7.31 km^{2} (2.82 sq mi)
- Length: 6 km (3.7 mi)
- Width: 2 km (1.2 mi)
- Highest elevation: 198.5 m (651.2 ft)

Administration
- Japan
- Prefecture: Tokushima Prefecture
- City: Naruto

Demographics
- Population: 2686 (2015)
- Ethnic groups: Japanese

Ōge-jima (大毛島) is an island in the Seto Inland Sea administered under Naruto in Tokushima Prefecture.

== Geography ==
Ōge-jima, also called Ōge Island, is located in the northeast of Tokushima Prefecture, on the island of Shikoku, Japan. Together with Taka-shima and Shimada-jima, the island to which it is connected by the Horikoshi Bridge (堀越橋), it forms the northeast part of Naruto. It is connected to the island of Shikoku by the Konaruto Bridge, and by the Ōnaruto Bridge spanning the Naruto Strait, to Awaji Island, an island in the Seto Inland Sea.
