= Seto Inland Sea =

Japanese Inland Sea

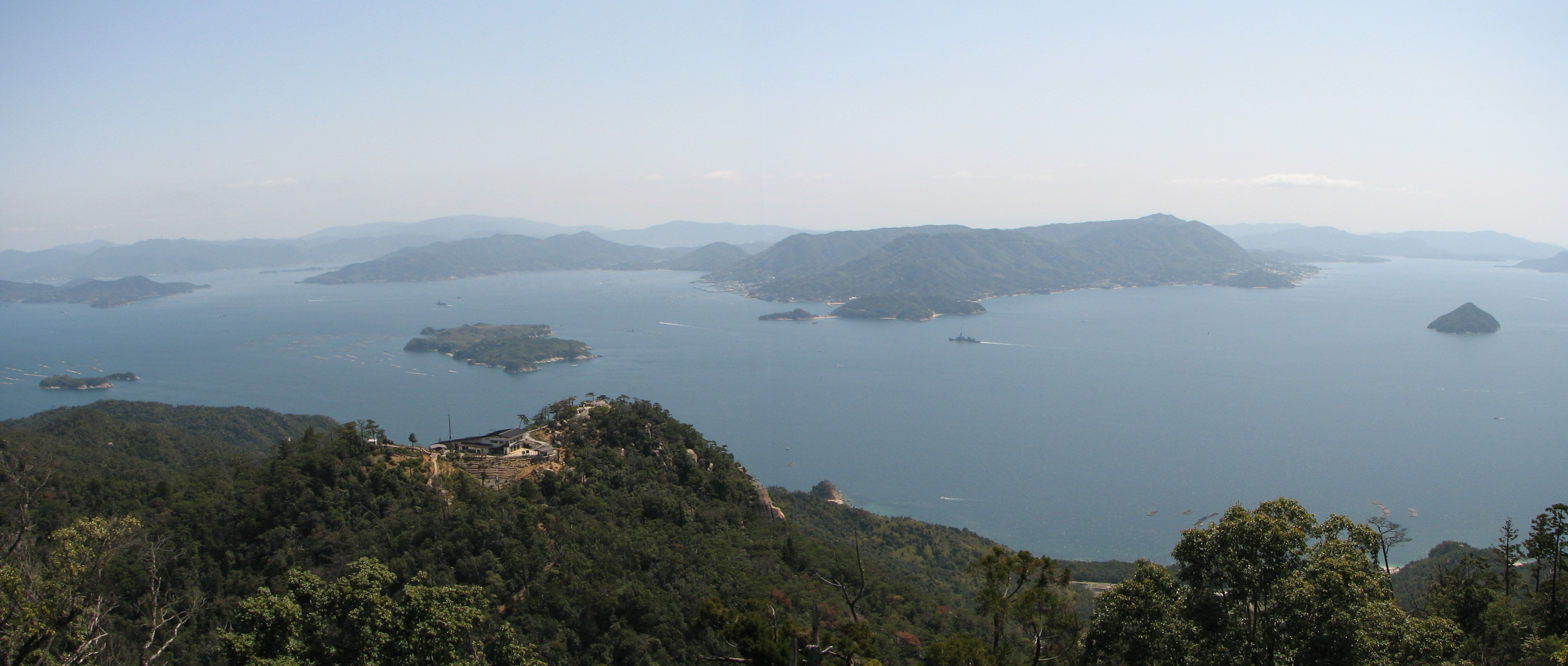
- View of the Seto Inland Sea from Miyajima island

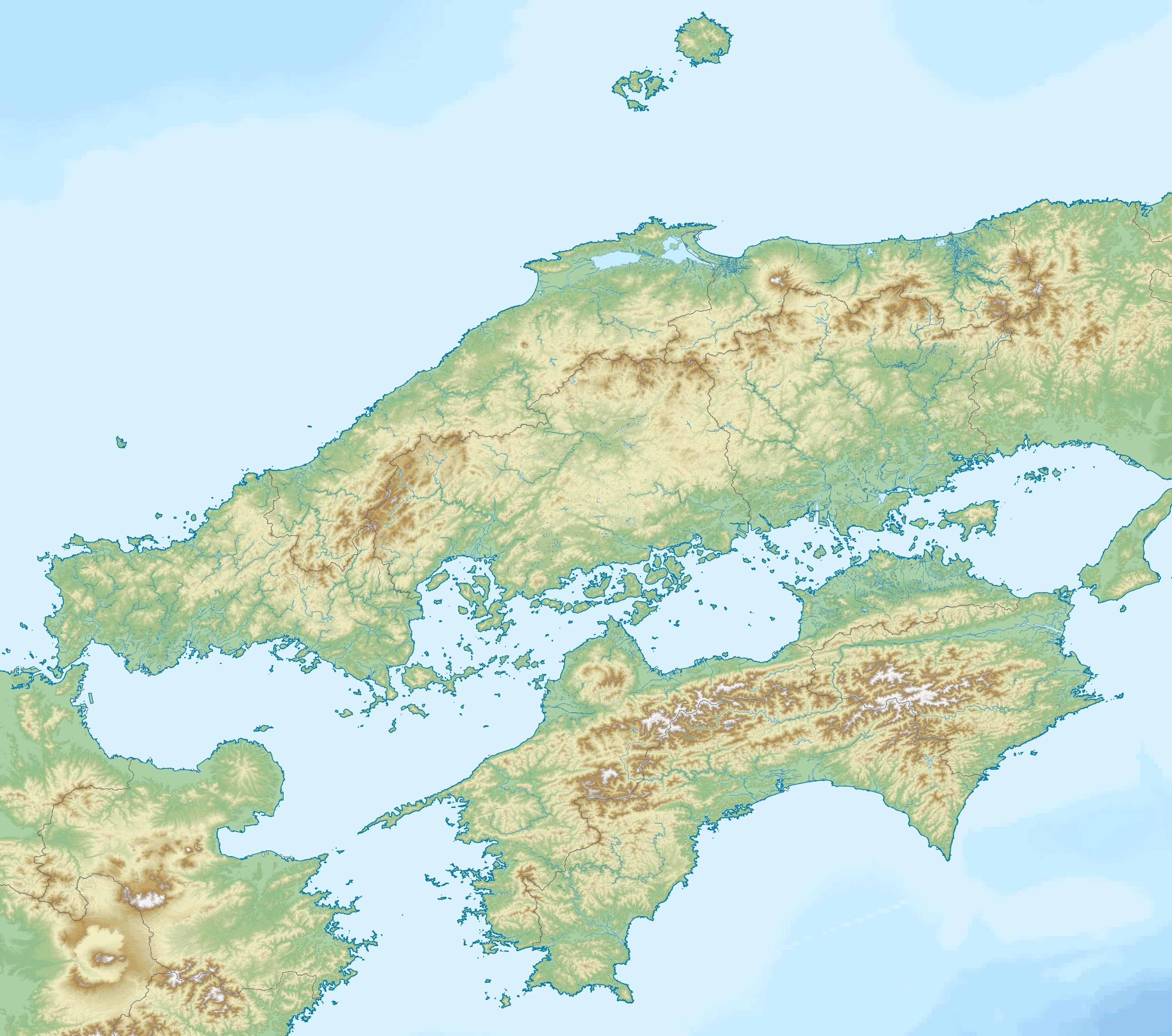
- Location within Japan Location within Chūgoku - Shikoku region

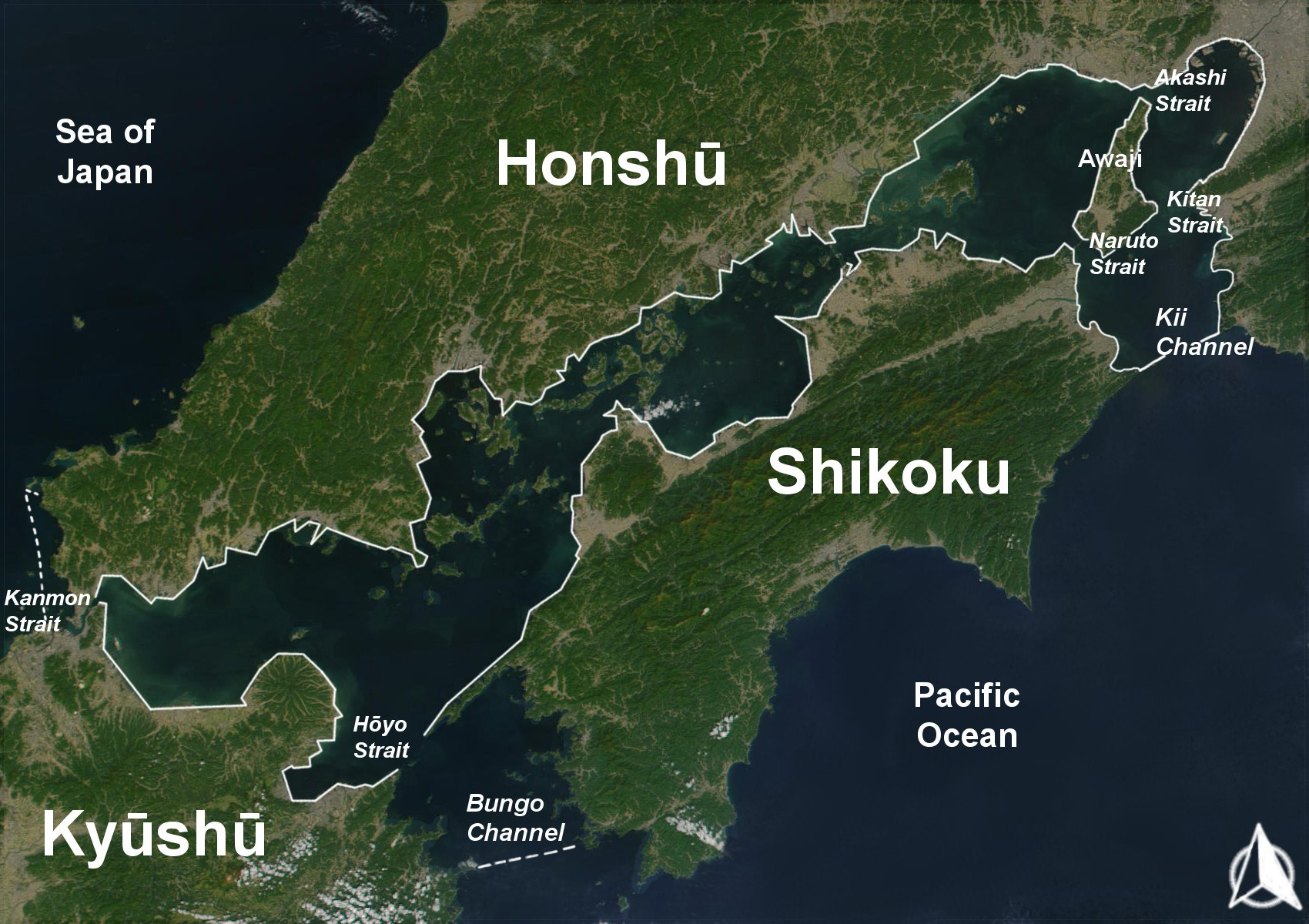
- The Inland Sea and its major straits
- Location: Pacific Ocean
- Coordinates: 34°10′N 133°20′E
- Type: Sea
- Basin countries: Japan
- Surface area: 23,203 km^{2} (9,000 sq mi)
- Average depth: 38 m (125 ft)

The Seto Inland Sea (瀬戸内海, Seto Naikai), sometimes shortened to the Inland Sea, is the body of water separating Honshu, Shikoku, and Kyushu, three of the four main islands of Japan. It serves as a waterway connecting the Pacific Ocean to the Sea of Japan. It connects to Osaka Bay and provides a sea transport link to industrial centers in the Kansai region, including Osaka and Kobe. Before the construction of the San'yō Main Line, it was the main transportation link between Kansai and Kyūshū.

Yamaguchi, Hiroshima, Okayama, Hyōgo, Osaka, Wakayama, Kagawa, Ehime, Tokushima, Fukuoka, and Ōita prefectures have coastlines on the Seto Inland Sea; the cities of Hiroshima, Iwakuni, Takamatsu, and Matsuyama are also located on it.

The Setouchi region encompasses the sea and surrounding coastal areas. The region is known for its warm and dry climate and relatively low rainfall levels. The sea experiences periodic red tides caused by dense groupings of certain phytoplankton that result in the death of large numbers of fish. Since the 1980s, the sea's northern and southern shores have been connected by the three routes of the Honshū–Shikoku Bridge Project, including the Great Seto Bridge, which serves both railroad and automobile traffic.

== Extent ==
The International Hydrographic Organization's definition of the limits of the Seto Inland Sea (published in 1953) is as follows:

On the West. The southeastern limit of the Japan Sea [In Shimonoseki-kaikyo. A line running from Nagoya Saki (130°49'E) in Kyûsû through the islands of Uma Sima and Muture Simia (33°58',5N) to Murasaki Hana (34°01'N) in Honsyû].

On the East (Kii Suidô). A line running from Takura Saki (34°16'N) in Honsyû to Oishi Hana in the island of Awazi, through this island to Sio Saki (34°11'N) and on to Oiso Saki in Sikoku.

On the South (Bungo Suidô). A line joining Sada Misaki (33°20'N) in Sikoku and Seki Saki in Kyûsyû.

== Geographical features ==
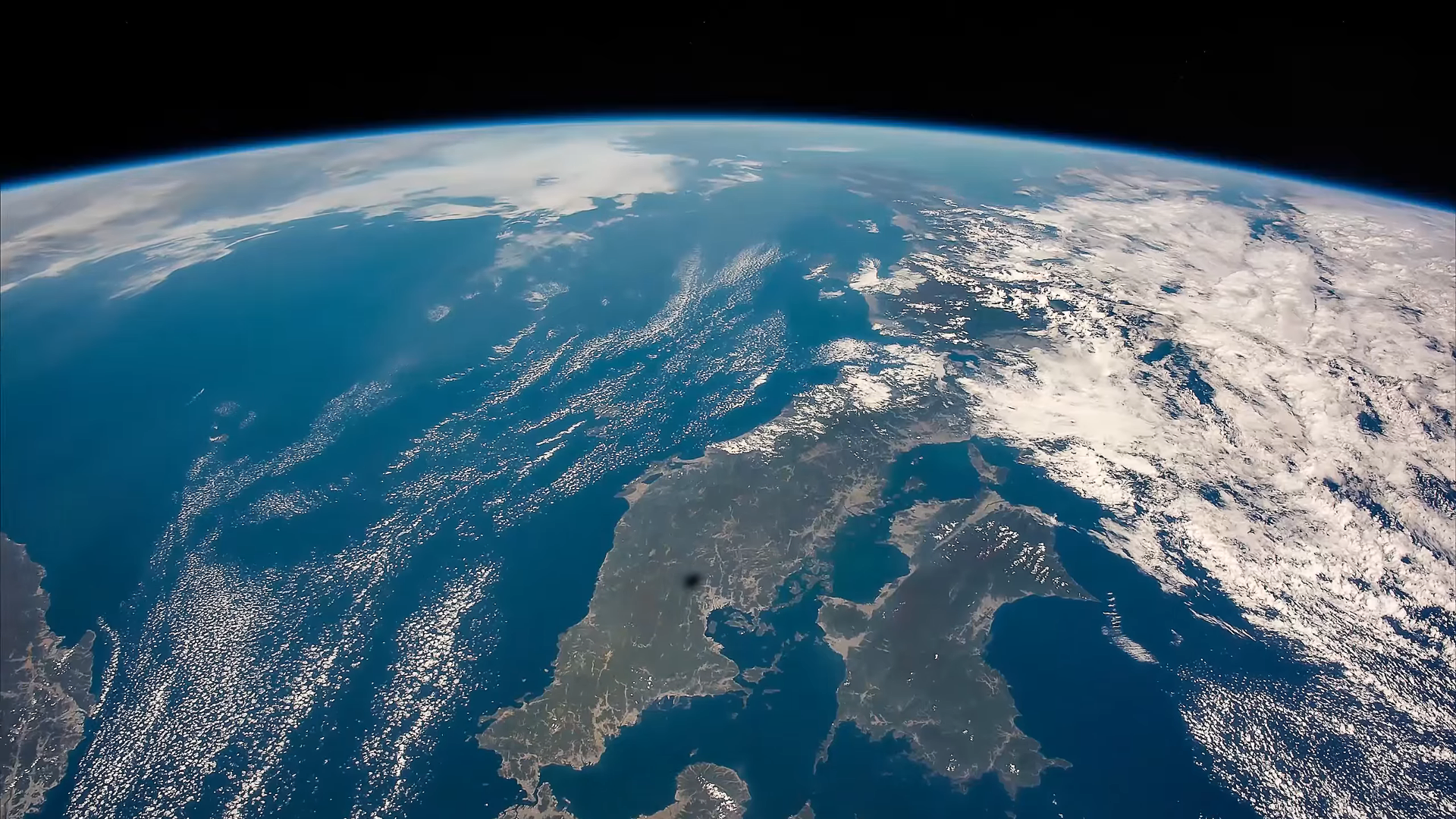
The Seto Inland Sea with Shikoku and Chūgoku from the ISS

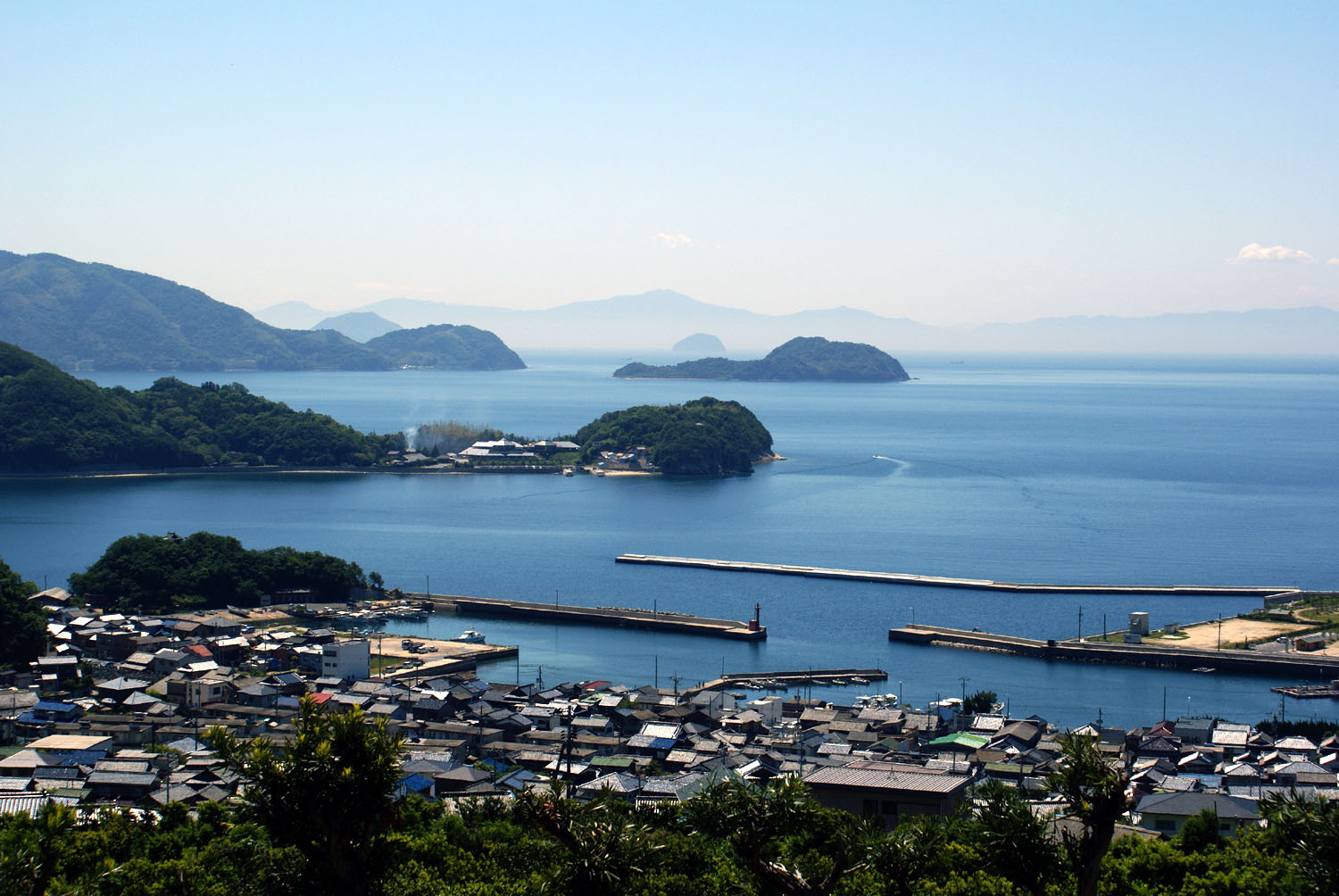
Islands in the Seto Inland Sea, Suō-Ōshima, Yamaguchi Prefecture

The Seto Inland Sea is 450 km (280 mi) long from east to west. The width from south to north varies from 15 to 55 km (9.3 to 34.2 mi). In most places, the water is relatively shallow. The average depth is 38 metres (125 feet); the greatest depth is 105 metres (344 feet).

Hydrologically, Seto Inland Sea is not a true inland sea, being neither an epeiric body of water like Hudson Bay nor an isolated endorheic basin like the Caspian Sea. Rather, it is actually a marginal sea: a division of a wider ocean (in this case the Pacific) which is partially enclosed by islands, archipelagos, or peninsulas (here, the Japanese Home Islands), adjacent to or widely open to the open ocean at the surface. The Naruto Strait connects the eastern part of the Seto Inland Sea to the Kii Channel, which in turn connects to the Pacific. The western part of the Seto Inland Sea connects to the Sea of Japan through the Kanmon Straits and to the Pacific through the Bungo Channel.

Each part of the Seto Inland Sea has a separate name in Japanese. For example, Iyo-nada (伊予灘) refers to the strait between Ehime, Yamaguchi, and Ōita prefectures in the western portion of the sea; Aki-nada (安芸灘) is the open expanse west of the Geiyo Islands, near Hiroshima prefecture; and Suō-nada (周防灘) refers to the expanse between Yamaguchi prefecture and Suō-Ōshima. These areas are sometimes styled Iyonada, Akinada, and Suonada. There are also many straits located between the major islands, as well as a number of smaller ones that pass between islands or connect the Seto Inland Sea to other seas or the Pacific. Almost 3,000 islands are located in the Seto Inland Sea. The largest island is Awaji-shima, and the second largest is Shōdo-shima. Many of the smaller islands are uninhabited.

=== Major islands ===
- Eastern part: Awaji Island, Shōdo Island, Ieshima Islands, Naoshima Islands, Shiwaku Islands, Yumeshima
- Central part: Geiyo Islands (including Ōmishima, Innoshima), Itsukushima (popularly known as Miyajima), Hinase Islands, Kasaoka Islands
- Western part: Suō-Ōshima, Uwakai Islands, Hashira-jima Islands.

== Fauna ==
Over 500 marine species are known to live in the Seto Inland Sea. Examples are the ayu, an amphidromous fish, horseshoe crab, finless porpoise, and great white shark, which has occasionally attacked people in the Seto Inland Sea. In the past, whales entered the sea to feed or breed, however because of whaling and pollution, they are rarely seen.

== History ==
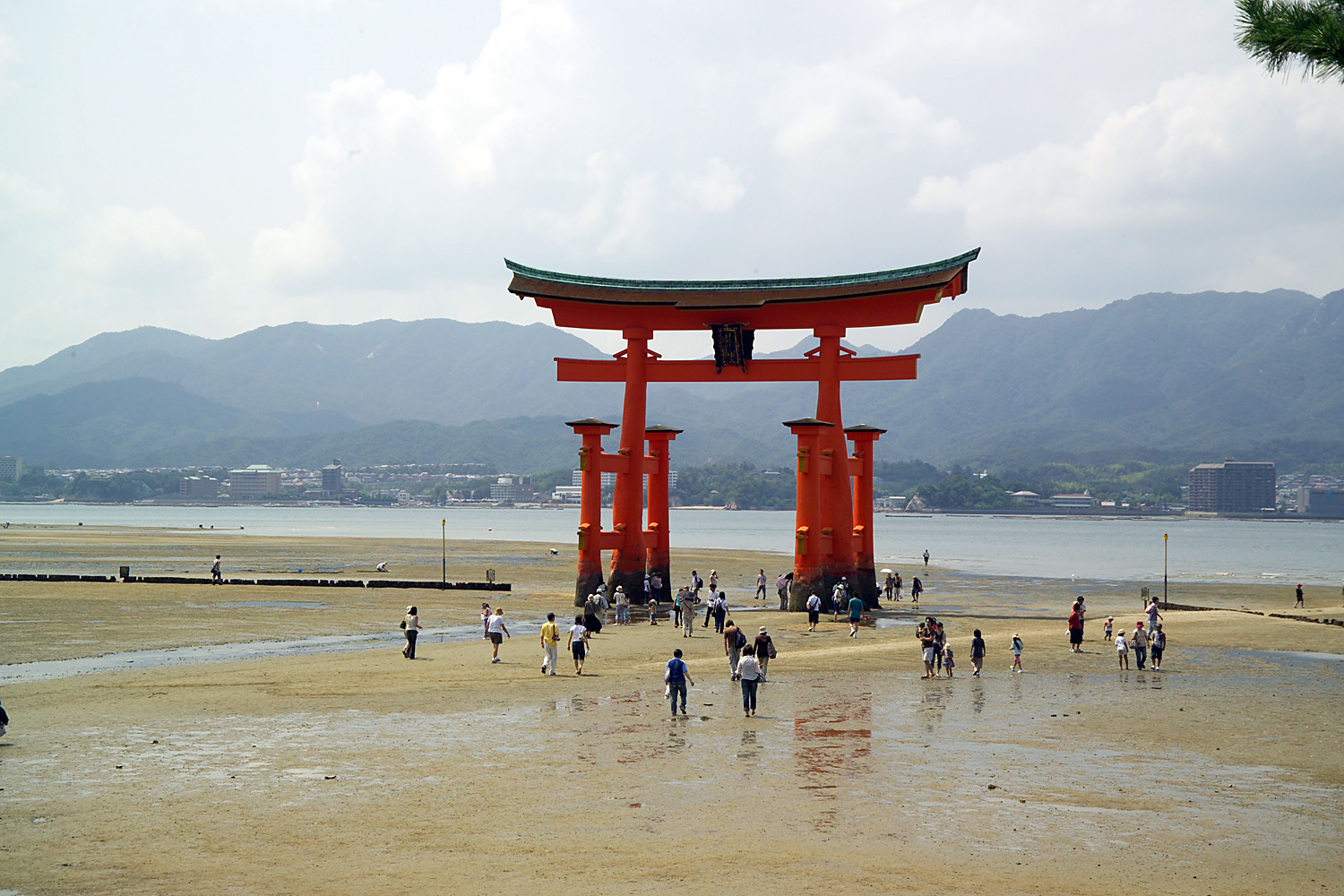
Seto Inland Sea seen from the torii of Itsukushima Shrine

During the last ice age, the sea level was lower than today. After the ice age, sea water poured into a basin between the Chūgoku mountains and Shikoku mountains and formed the Seto Inland Sea as it is known today. From ancient times, the Seto Inland Sea served as a main transport line between its coastal areas, including what is today the Kansai region and Kyushu. It was also a main transport line between Japan and other countries, including Korea and China. Even after the creation of major highways such as the Nankaidō and San'yōdō, the Seto Inland Sea remained a major transport route. There are records that some foreign emissaries from China and Korea sailed on the Seto Inland Sea.

The importance of water traffic gave rise to private navies in the region. In many documents, these navies were called suigun (水軍; "water army"), or simply pirates. Sometimes they were considered to be public enemies, but in most cases they were granted the right to self-governance as a result of their strength. During the feudal period, suigun seized power in most coastal areas. The Kono in Iyo Province (today Ehime Prefecture) and Kobayakawa (later Mōri) in Aki Province (today a part of Hiroshima Prefecture) clans were two of the more famous suigun lords. In the 12th century, Taira no Kiyomori planned to move the capital from Kyoto to the coastal village of Fukuhara (today Kobe) to promote trade between Japan and the Song dynasty of China. This transfer was unsuccessful, and soon after Kyoto became the capital again. Later, the Battle of Yashima took place off the coast of present-day Takamatsu.

In the Edo period, the Seto Inland Sea was one of the busiest transport lines in Japan. It was a part of a navigational route around Japan's islands via the Sea of Japan. Many ships navigated from its coastal areas to the area along the Sea of Japan. Major ports in the Edo period were Osaka, Sakai, Shimotsui, Ushimado, and Tomonoura. The Seto Inland Sea also served many daimyōs in the western area of Japan as their route to and from Edo, to fulfill their obligations under sankin-kōtai. Many used ships from Osaka. Thanks to transport through the Seto Inland Sea, Osaka became the economic center of Japan. Each han had an office called Ozakayashiki in Osaka. These Ozakayashiki were among Japan's earliest forms of banks, facilitating domestic trade and helping to organize the income of the daimyo, which was in the form of koku, giant bales of rice.

The Seto Inland Sea was also part of the official Joseon Tongsinsa route, bringing Korean emissaries to the shogunate. After the Meiji Restoration, the coastal cities along the Seto Inland Sea were rapidly industrialized. One of the headquarters of the Japanese Navy was built in the town of Kure. Since the Meiji period, development of land transport has been reducing the importance of the Seto Inland Sea as a transport line. Remarkable land transportation innovations include the San'yō Main Railroad Line in Honshū and the Yosan Main Railroad Line in Shikoku (both completed before World War II) and three series of bridges connecting Honshū and Shikoku (completed in the late 20th century). The Seto Inland Sea is still used, however, by an international cargo transport line and several local transport lines connecting Honshū with Shikoku and Kyūshū.

== Industry ==
Major cities with heavy industrial activity on the coast of the Seto Inland Sea include Osaka, Kobe, and Hiroshima. Smaller scale manufacturing and industry can also be found in Kurashiki, Kure, Fukuyama, and Ube in Honshū, and Sakaide, Imabari, and Niihama in Shikoku. Major industries include steel production, vehicle manufacture, ship building, textiles, and since the 1960s, oil refining and chemical products. Imabari Shipbuilding, Japan's largest ship building company, has its headquarters and some of its yards in Imabari, Ehime Prefecture. Thanks to the moderate climate and beautiful landscape, fishing, agriculture, and tourism bring a lot of income to the area as well.

== Transport ==
Major highways in the Seto Inland Sea. Yellow: Kobe-Awaji-Naruto. Green: Seto-Ōhashi. Red: Nishiseto Expressway.

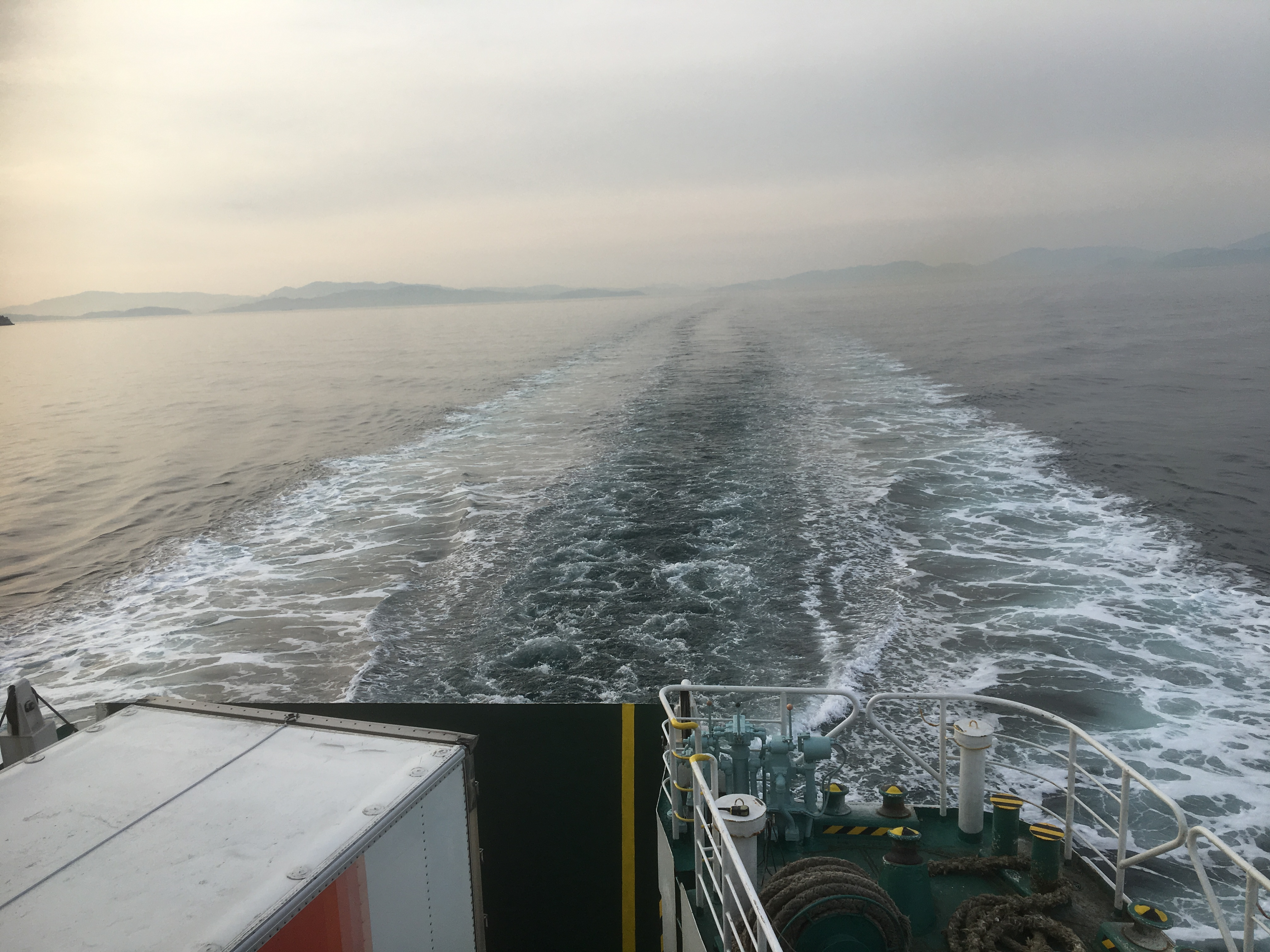
KURE-MATSUYAMA ferry, Seto Inland Sea 2017

Today the Seto Inland Sea serves its coastal areas mainly for two purposes: first, international or domestic cargo transportation, and second, local transportation between coastal areas and islands on the sea. Major ports are Kobe, Okayama, Takamatsu, Tokushima, Matsuyama, and Hiroshima.

Historically, the Seto Inland Sea as transport line served four coastal areas: Kansai, Chūgoku, Shikoku, and eastern Kyūshū. The Seto Inland Sea provided each of these regions with local transportation and connected each region to the others and far areas, including the coastal area of the Sea of Japan, Korea, and China. After Kobe port was founded in 1868 to serve foreign ships, the Seto Inland Sea became a major international waterway with connection to the Pacific.

Development of land transportation shifted the travel between east and west — that is, between Honshū and Kyūshū — to railroad and road transport. Two coastal railways, San'yō Main Line in Honshū and Yosan Main Line, were built. Those railway lines stimulated the local economy and once invoked a rail mania. Many short railroads were planned to connect a certain station of those two lines and a local seaport on the Seto Inland Sea, and some of them were actually built. The Ministry of Railroads, later the Japanese National Railways and then Shikoku Railway Company, ran some train ferry lines between Honshū and Shikoku including the line between Uno Station (Tamano) and Takamatsu Station (Takamatsu). When the Great Seto Bridge was finished and began to serve the two coastal areas, that ferry line was abolished.

=== Highways and bridges ===
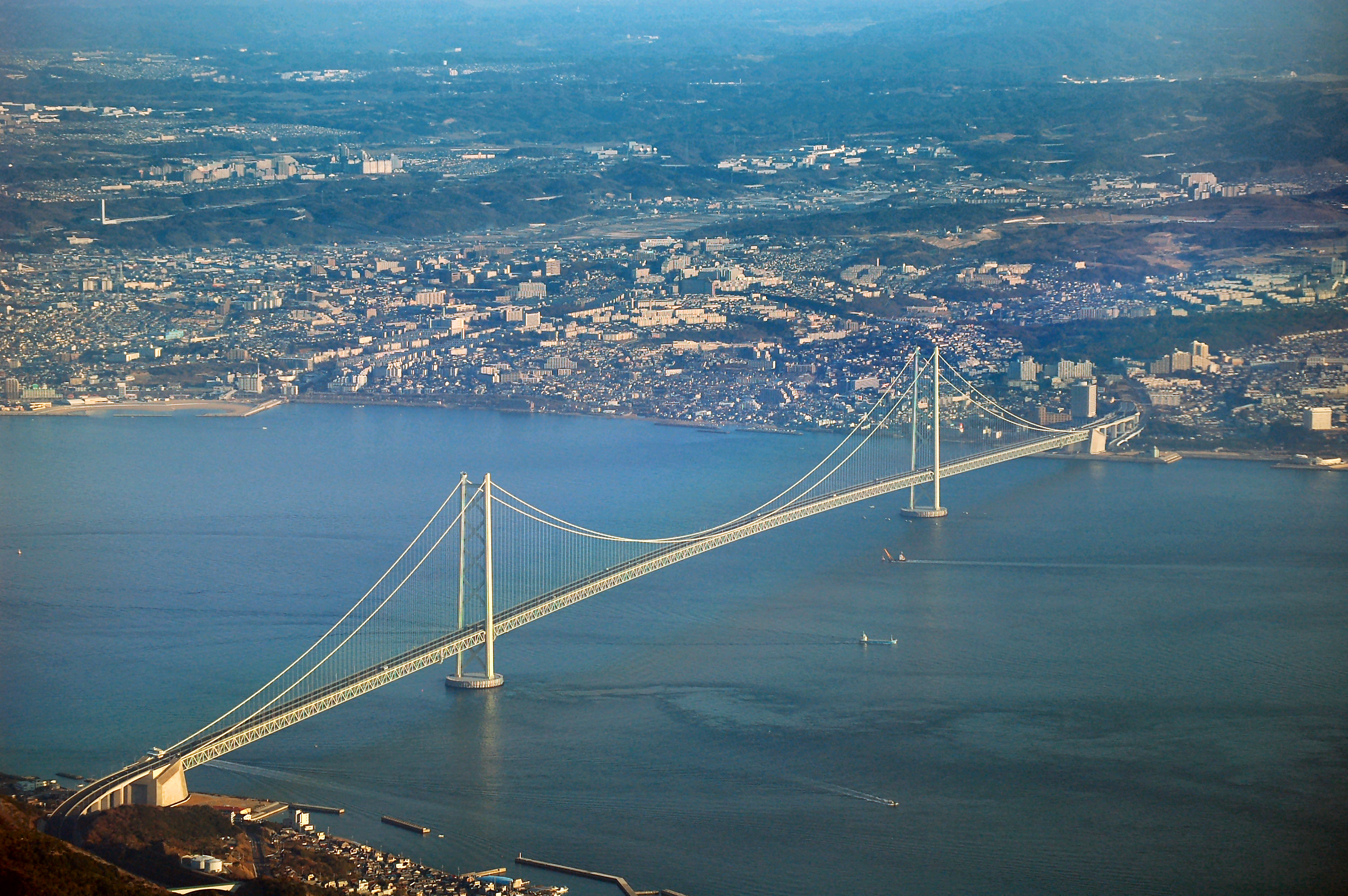
Akashi Kaikyō Bridge

The main islands Honshū and Shikoku are connected by three series of bridges since the late 1980s. This improves land transportation between the connected islands. These series of bridges, collectively known as the Honshū–Shikoku Bridge Project, are, from east to west, Akashi Kaikyo Bridge, Great Seto Bridge, and Nishiseto Expressway.

==== Kobe-Awaji-Naruto Highway ====
The easternmost highway was built between 1976 and 1998. It leads from Akashi (Hyōgo Prefecture) on the Akashi Kaikyo Bridge (the second-longest suspension bridge in the world) to Awaji Island, from there via the Ōnaruto Bridge to Ōge-jima (Naruto, Tokushima Prefecture) beyond the 1.3-kilometer wide Naruto Strait and finally across the Muya Bridge to Shikoku.

==== Seto Chuo Highway ====
The Great Seto Bridge connects Okayama Prefecture with Kagawa Prefecture since 1988. It consists of a total of six two-storey bridges, whose lower floors are used by the railway (Japan Railways Group). The high speed Shinkansen does not go to or on Shikoku.

==== Nishiseto Highway / Shimanami Highway ====
This is the first of three intersections of the Seto Inland Sea. Construction started in 1975, but was fully completed in 1999. It connects the Nishiseto- Onomichi Highway in Hiroshima Prefecture with a total of ten bridges and several smaller islands with Imabari in Ehime Prefecture. Approximately 100,000 people live on those islands. The bridges are: Shin Onomichi Bridge, Innoshima Bridge, Ikuchi Bridge, Tatara Bridge, Ōmishima Bridge, the two Ōshima bridges and the three Kurushima Kaikyo bridges. The Kurushima Kaikyō Bridge connects the island of Ōshima to the main island of Shikoku.

==== Other bridges ====
The Akinada Tobishima Kaido route connects seven of the western Geiyo Islands to mainland Honshu near Kure, Hiroshima.

=== Maritime ===
Seto Naikai Pilots Area provides compulsory maritime piloting for vessels over 10,000 tones, it was divided into sections of Bisanseto and sections of Kurushima, connecting Kanmon Channel Piloting Area and Osaka Bay Piloting Area.

== Major tourist sites ==
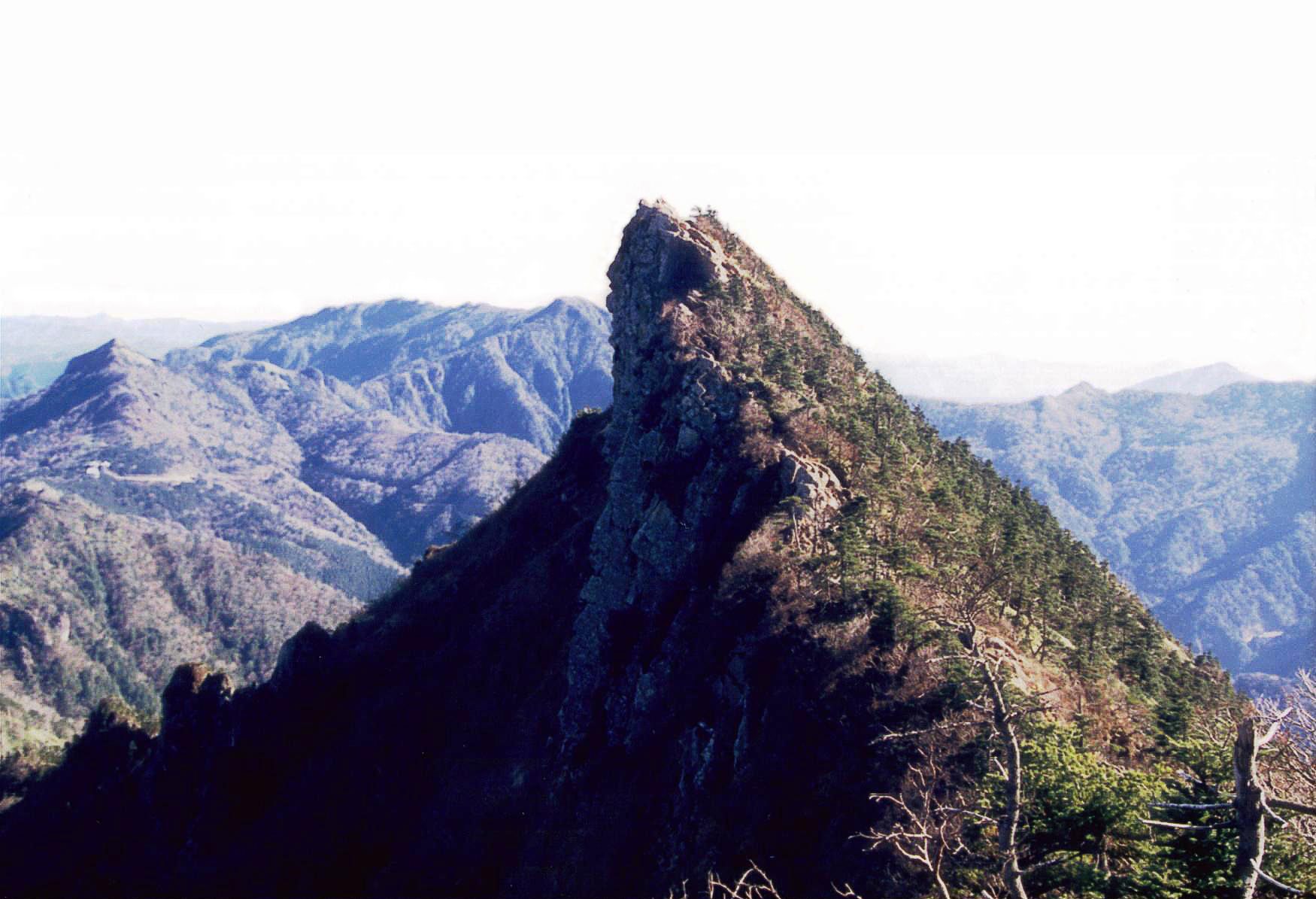
Mount Ishizuchi

The coastal area of the Seto Inland Sea is one Japan's major tourist destinations. Even before the country opened to foreigners in the middle of the 19th century, the sea's beauty was praised and introduced to the Western world by those who visited Japan, including Philipp Franz von Siebold, and after the country's opening, Ferdinand von Richthofen and Thomas Cook.

Its coastal area, except for Osaka Prefecture and a part of Wakayama Prefecture, was appointed the Setonaikai National Park (瀬戸内海国立公園, Setonaikai Kokuritsu kōen) on March 16, 1934, as one of three oldest national parks in Japan.

Itsukushima Shrine, on the island of Itsukushima in the city of Hatsukaichi, is a UNESCO World Heritage Site. Shōdoshima, nicknamed the "island of olives", and the Naruto whirlpools are two other well-known tourist sites. Neighboring locations like Kotohira and Okayama are often combined with the tour of the Setouchi region. Some historic sites, including Yashima in Takamatsu and Kurashiki, also attract many visitors. Hiroshima is home to the Hiroshima Peace Memorial (Genbaku Dome) which is another UNESCO World Heritage Site because of atomic bomb damage in 1945. Idol Unit STU48 operate on a cruise on the Setuchi.

The eastern end of the Sea hosts the Setouchi Triennale art festival, which was inaugurated in 2010. Some events take place on the island of Naoshima, known colloquially as the art island, and the home of several permanent museums.

At the far eastern extremity, as the Sea meets the Pacific Ocean, are the Naruto whirlpools that can be reached by sight-seeing boats.

The Shiwaku Islands are a defined group numbering 28 that can be reached by ferry boat from Marugame. Here Richard Henry Brunton built one of his lighthouses that can still be seen, and the grave of Frank Toovey Lake, a young midshipman in his survey party, is on the island of Sanuki Hiroshima.

In the central area of Seto Inland Sea is Mount Ishizuchi on Shikoku. It is the highest mountain in western Japan and the highest mountain on Shikoku.

In the western end of the Sea is Mimosusogawa Park in Shimonoseki. It commemorates the final stage of the Genpei war between the feudal Taira clan and Minamoto clan (1180–1185).

== Literature ==
Some sites along the Seto Inland Sea were featured in eighth-century Japanese literature, both in prose and in verse, including Kojiki, Nihon Shoki, and Man'yōshū. Since some sites were used as places of exile, their feeling and landscape were evoked in waka. In fiction, in The Tale of Genji, Genji fled from Kyoto and resided in Suma (now a part of Kobe) and Akashi for two years.

In medieval literature, because of the Genpei War, the Seto Inland Sea is one of the important backgrounds of The Tale of the Heike, particularly in its latter part.

In the Western world, Donald Richie wrote a literary nonfiction travelogue called The Inland Sea relating a journey along the sea, beginning from the East at Himeji and ending at Miyajima in the West, close to Hiroshima, going from island to island, exploring the landscape, meeting and discussing with local people, as well as musing on Japanese culture, the nature of travel and of identity, and his own personal sense of identity. In 1991, filmmakers Lucille Carra and Brian Cotnoir produced a film version of Richie's book, which further explored the region through interviews and images photographed by Hiro Narita. Produced by Travelfilm Company and adapted by Carra, the film won numerous awards, including Best Documentary at the Hawaii International Film Festival (1991) and the Earthwatch Film Award. It screened at the Sundance Film Festival in 1992.

Koushun Takami's novel Battle Royale took place on a fictional island in the Seto Inland Sea.

A critical plot element of the Japanese series Fafner in the Azure is an alien life form discovered at the bottom of this sea known as the Seto Inland Sea Mir.

Author and literary critic Amy Chavez's The Widow, the Priest and the Octopus Hunter: Discovering a Lost Way of Life on a Secluded Japanese Island is an account of the author's firsthand experience living among and interacting with the residents of Shiraishi.
