= Tatara Bridge =

Tatara Bridge (多々羅大橋, Tatara Ōhashi)
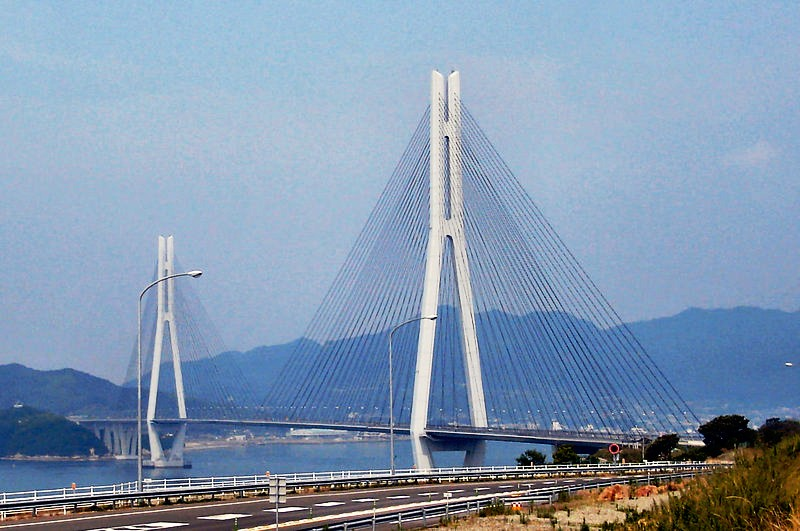
- the Tatara Bridge
- Coordinates: 34°15′34.1″N 133°3′41.5″E
- Carries: 4 lanes of roadway bicycle/pedestrian lanes
- Crosses: Seto Inland Sea
- Locale: Hiroshima and Ehime Prefectures
- Maintained by: Honshū-Shikoku Bridge Authority

Characteristics
- Design: Cable-stayed bridge
- Total length: 1,480 metres (4,856 ft)
- Width: 30.6 metres (100 ft)
- Longest span: 890 metres (2,920 ft)
- Clearance below: 26 metres (85 ft)

History
- Construction cost: ¥140 billion
- Opened: May 1, 1999

Location
- Interactive map of Tatara Bridge (多々羅大橋, Tatara Ōhashi)

The Tatara Bridge (多々羅大橋, Tatara Ōhashi) is a cable-stayed bridge that is part of the Nishiseto Expressway, commonly known as the Shimanami Kaidō しまなみ海道. The bridge has a center span of 890 metres (2,920 ft). As of 2010, it has the fourth longest main span of any cable-stayed bridge after the Sutong Bridge. The expressway is a series of roads and bridges that is one of the three routes of the Honshū-Shikoku Bridge Project connecting the islands of Honshū and Shikoku across the Seto Inland Sea in Japan. The Kurushima-Kaikyō Bridge is on the same route.

The bridge, which opened on May 1, 1999, carries two lanes of traffic in each direction and has additional lanes for bicycles, motor bikes, and pedestrians.

The Tatara Bridge was originally planned as a suspension bridge in 1973. In 1989, the design was changed to a cable-stayed bridge with the same span. By building a cable-stayed bridge a large excavation for an anchorage would not be needed, thereby lessening the environmental impact on the surrounding area. The steel towers are 220 metres (722 ft) high and shaped like an inverted Y. The side-spans are 164.5 metres (540 ft) and 257.5 metres (845 ft) respectively, and there are also three very small cable spans.

Construction of the bridge took a little more than six years and was accomplished without any accidents. Many technological advancements were part of the design and testing of the bridge.
