= Kurushima Kaikyō Bridge =

Kurushima Kaikyō Bridge 来島海峡大橋
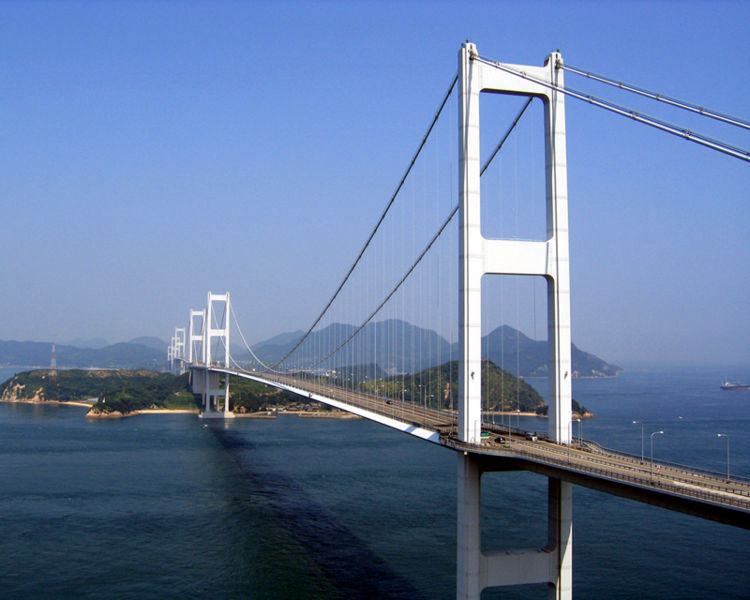
- Coordinates: 34°07′14″N 132°59′51″E
- Carries: 4 lanes of roadway moped lane bicycle/pedestrian lane
- Crosses: Seto Inland Sea
- Locale: Imabari, Ehime, Japan
- Maintained by: Honshū-Shikoku Bridge Project

Characteristics
- Design: Suspension bridge
- Total length: 4,105 metres (13,468 ft)
- Width: 27 metres (89 ft)

History
- Construction start: May 15, 1988
- Opened: May 1, 1999

Location
- Interactive map of Kurushima Kaikyō Bridge

The Kurushima Kaikyō Bridge (来島海峡大橋, Kurushima Kaikyō Ō-hashi), which connects the island of Ōshima to the main part of Shikoku, was the world's longest suspension bridge structure when completed, in 1999. The bridge is part of the Shimanami Kaidō, an expressway that spans a series of islands and connects Hiroshima Prefecture in Honshū to Ehime Prefecture in Shikoku, which is the smallest of Japan's four main islands. The bridge and the expressway were both conceived by the Honshū-Shikoku Bridge Project.

== Construction ==
The Kurushima Kaikyō Bridge consists of three successive suspension bridges with six towers and four anchorages. There is a shared anchorage that joins each suspension bridge to the next. Its construction is similar to the western portion of San Francisco–Oakland Bay Bridge which is two successive suspension bridges with four towers and one shared anchorage. The bridge's total length of 4,015 metres (13,173 ft), is just a little longer than the total length of the two-tower Akashi Kaikyō Bridge, which is 3,911 metres (12,831 ft).

- First Kurushima Kaikyō Bridge (来島海峡第一大橋, Kurushima Kaikyō Daiichi Ō-hashi), main span 600 metres (1,969 ft)
- Second Kurushima Kaikyō Bridge (来島海峡第二大橋, Kurushima Kaikyō Daini Ō-hashi), main span 1,020 metres (3,346 ft) with 159.95 metres (525 ft) high east tower.
- Third Kurushima Kaikyō Bridge (来島海峡第三大橋, Kurushima Kaikyō Daisan Ō-hashi), main span 1,030 metres (3,379 ft) with 178 metres (584 ft) high towers.

== See also ==
- Akashi Kaikyō Bridge
- Great Seto Bridge
- List of bridges in Japan
- List of longest suspension bridge spans
