= Akashi Kaikyo Bridge =

Suspension bridge in Kobe, Japan

Akashi Kaikyo Bridge 明石海峡大橋
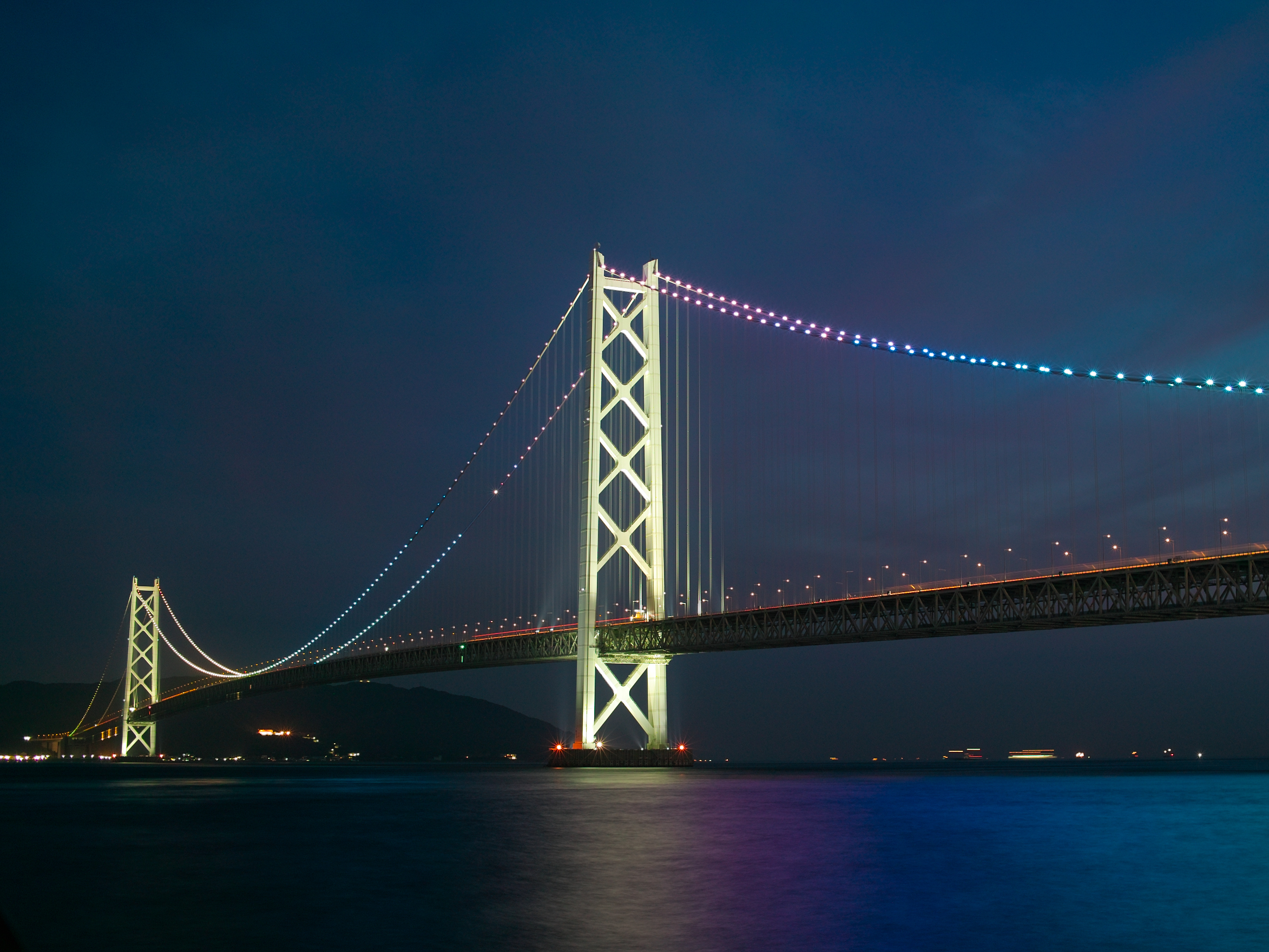
- View from Kobe towards Awaji Island, 2010
- Coordinates: 34.6162°N 135.0205°E
- Carries: Six lanes of the Kobe-Awaji-Naruto Expressway and four emergency lanes
- Crosses: Akashi Strait
- Locale: Awaji Island and Kobe
- Other name: Pearl Bridge
- Maintained by: Honshu-Shikoku Bridge Expressway Company Limited (JB Honshi Kōsoku)

Characteristics
- Design: Suspension bridge
- Total length: 3,911 metres (12,831 ft)
- Width: 35.5 metres (116 ft)
- Height: 282.8 metres (928 ft) (pylons)
- Longest span: 1,991 metres (6,532 ft)
- Clearance below: 65 metres (213 ft)

History
- Designer: Satoshi Kashima
- Construction start: 1988
- Construction end: 1998
- Opened: April 5, 1998

Statistics
- Toll: ¥2,300

Location
- Interactive map of Akashi Kaikyo Bridge

The Akashi Kaikyo Bridge (Japanese: 明石海峡大橋, Hepburn: Akashi Kaikyō Ōhashi) is a suspension bridge that links the city of Kobe on the Japanese island of Honshu and Iwaya, Awaji on Awaji Island. It is part of the Kobe-Awaji-Naruto Expressway, and crosses the busy and turbulent Akashi Strait (Akashi Kaikyō in Japanese). It was completed in 1998, and at the time, was the longest central span of any suspension bridge in the world, at 1,991 metres (6,532 ft). Currently, it is the second-longest, behind the 1915 Çanakkale Bridge in Turkey that was opened in March 2022.

The Akashi Kaikyo Bridge is one of the key links of the Honshū–Shikoku Bridge Project, which created three routes across the Seto Inland Sea.

== History ==
=== Background ===
The Akashi Kaikyo Bridge forms part of the Kobe-Awaji-Naruto Expressway, the easternmost route of the bridge system linking the islands of Honshu and Shikoku. The bridge crosses the Akashi Strait (width 4 km) between Kobe on Honshu and Iwaya on Awaji Island; the other major part of the crossing is completed by the Ōnaruto Bridge, which links Awaji Island to Ōge Island across the Naruto Strait.

Before the Akashi Kaikyo Bridge was built, ferries carried passengers across the Akashi Strait. A major passageway for shipping, it is also known for its gales, heavy rain, storms, and other natural disasters. The Sekirei Maru sinking in stormy weather in December 1945, while carrying more than three times its capacity of 100 passengers, killed 304 people, first stirring public discussion on the possibility of a bridge over the span. In 1955, two ferries sank in the Shiun Maru disaster during a storm, killing 168 people. The ensuing shock and public outrage convinced the Japanese government to develop plans for a bridge to cross the strait.

=== Investigations ===
Investigations for a bridge across the strait were first conducted by the Kobe municipal government in 1957, followed by an evaluation by the national Ministry of Construction in 1959. In 1961, the Ministry of Construction and Japan National Railways jointly commissioned the Japan Society of Civil Engineers (JSCE) to conduct a technical study, and the JSCE established a committee to investigate five potential routes between Honshu and Shikoku. In 1967, the committee compiled the results of the technical study, concluding that a bridge across the Akashi Strait would face "extremely severe design and construction conditions, which have no similar examples in the world's long-span bridges" and recommending an additional study.

In response to the report, the Honshu–Shikoku Bridge Authority (now the Honshu-Shikoku Bridge Expressway Company) was established in 1970, which conducted extensive investigations, including sea trials to establish the construction method of a submarine foundation. In 1973, a bridge with a central span of 1,780 meters on the route was approved, but construction was halted due to poor economic conditions.

=== Construction ===
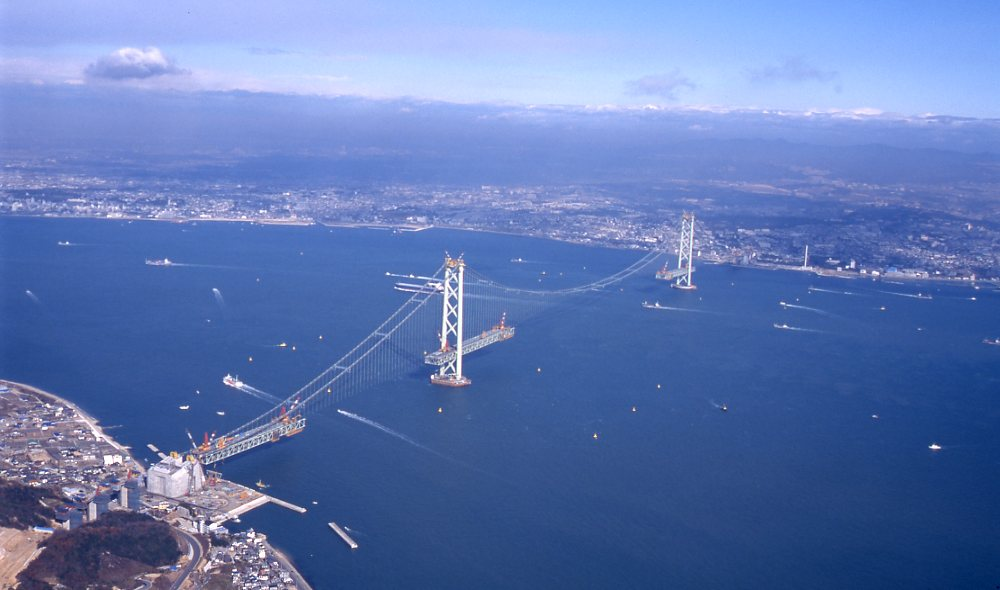
The construction site of the Akashi Kaikyo Bridge in December 1995

The original plan called for a mixed railway-road bridge, but when construction on the bridge began in April 1988, it was restricted to road only, with six lanes. Actual construction did not begin until May 1988 and involved more than 100 contractors. The Great Hanshin Earthquake in January 1995 did not do substantial damage to the bridge due to anti-seismic building methods. Construction was finished on time in September 1996. The bridge was opened for traffic on April 5, 1998, in a ceremony officiated by the then-Crown Prince Naruhito and his spouse Crown Princess Masako of Japan along with Construction Minister Tsutomu Kawara. The bridge was the last Japanese megaproject of the 20th century.

== Structure ==
=== Substructures ===
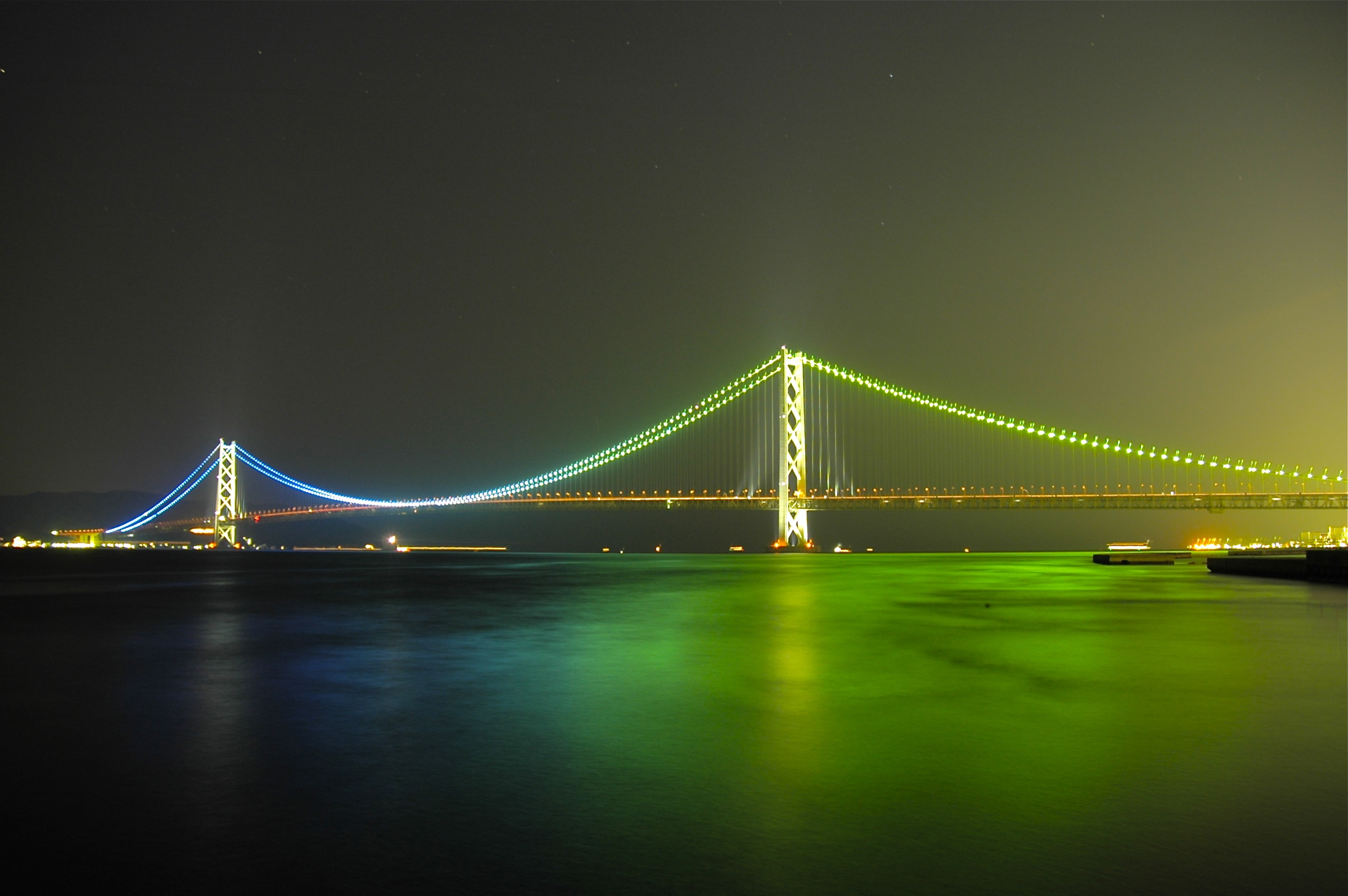
The illuminated Akashi Kaikyo Bridge, 2006.

The bridge has four substructures: two main piers (located beneath the water) and two anchorages (on land). These are denoted 1A, 2P, 3P, and 4A in sequence from the Kobe side. 1A consists of an underground circular retaining wall filled with roller-compacted concrete, 2P and 3P are circular underwater spread-foundation caisson structures, and 4A is a rectangular direct foundation. 2P is located at the edge of the sea plateau at a level depth of 40–50 m and a bearing depth of 60 m, and 3P is located at the symmetrical point to 2P with respect to the bridge's center, at a level depth of 36–39 m and a bearing depth of 57 m.

Video of the bridge, as seen from a ship passing underneath

The towers are located in an area of strong tidal currents where water velocity exceeds 7 knots (about 3.6 m/s). The selected scour protection measure includes the installation of a filtering layer with a thickness of 2 m in a range of 10 m around the caisson, covered with riprap of 8 m thick.

=== Superstructures ===
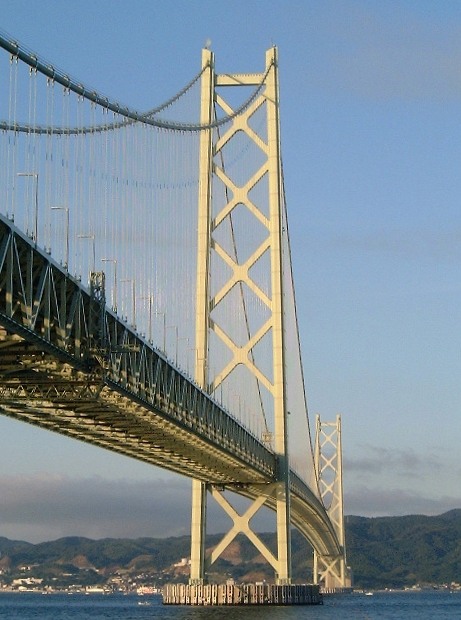
Main supporting towers

The bridge has three spans. The central span is 1,991 m (6,532 ft), and the two other sections are each 960 m (3,150 ft). The bridge is 3,911 m (12,831 ft) long overall. The two towers were originally 1,990 m (6,530 ft) apart, but the Great Hanshin earthquake on January 17, 1995 (magnitude 7.3, with epicenter 20 km west of Kobe) moved the towers (the only structures that had been erected at the time) such that the central span had to be increased by 1 m (3.3 ft). The central span was required to be greater than 1,500 m to accommodate maritime traffic; it was concluded before construction began that a larger span between 1950 and 2050 meters would minimize construction costs.

The bridge was designed with a dual-hinged stiffening girder system, allowing the structure to withstand winds of 286 kilometres per hour (178 mph), earthquakes measuring up to magnitude 8.5, and harsh sea currents. The bridge also contains tuned mass dampers that are designed to operate at the resonance frequency of the bridge to damp forces. The two main supporting towers rise 282.8 m (928 ft) above sea level, and the bridge can expand because of heat by up to 2 m (6.6 ft) over the course of a day. Each anchorage required 350,000 tonnes (340,000 long tons; 390,000 short tons) of concrete. The steel cables have 300,000 kilometres (190,000 mi) of wire: each cable is 112 centimetres (44 in) in diameter and contains 36,830 strands of wire.

The Akashi–Kaikyo bridge has a total of 1,737 illumination lights: 1,084 for the main cables, 116 for the main towers, 405 for the girders and 132 for the anchorages. Sets of three high-intensity discharge lamps in the colors red, green and blue are mounted on the main cables. The RGB color model and computer technology make for a variety of combinations. Twenty-eight patterns are used for occasions such as national or regional holidays, memorial days or festivities.

A comparison of the side elevation of the Akashi Kaikyo Bridge to the side elevations of some of the most notable bridges around the world on the same scale (see also interactive version)

== Cost ==
The total cost is estimated at ¥500 billion or US$3.6 billion (per 1998 exchange rates). It is expected to be repaid by charging drivers a toll to cross the bridge. The toll is 2,300 yen and the bridge is used by approximately 23,000 cars per day.

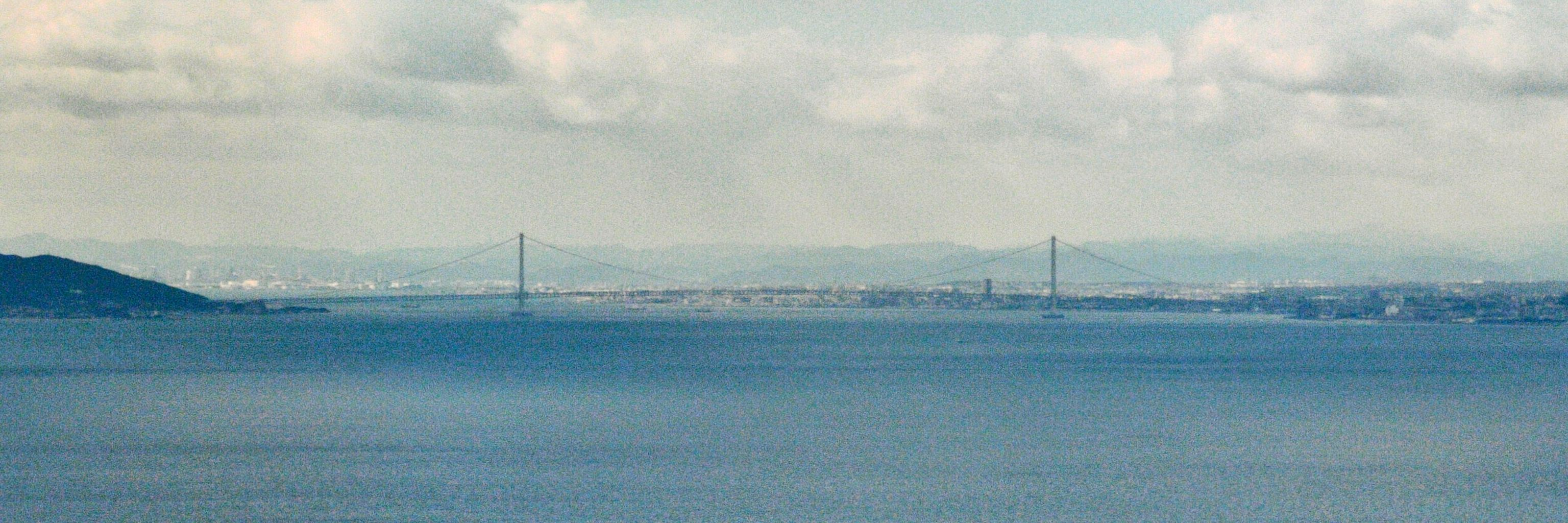
Akashi-Kaikyo Bridge viewed from Kansai International Airport

== See also ==
- Rainbow Bridge (Tokyo)
