= Nishiseto Expressway =

Road connecting the Honshū and Shikoku Islands in Japan

Nishiseto Expressway
- 西瀬戸自動車道 (しまなみ海道)
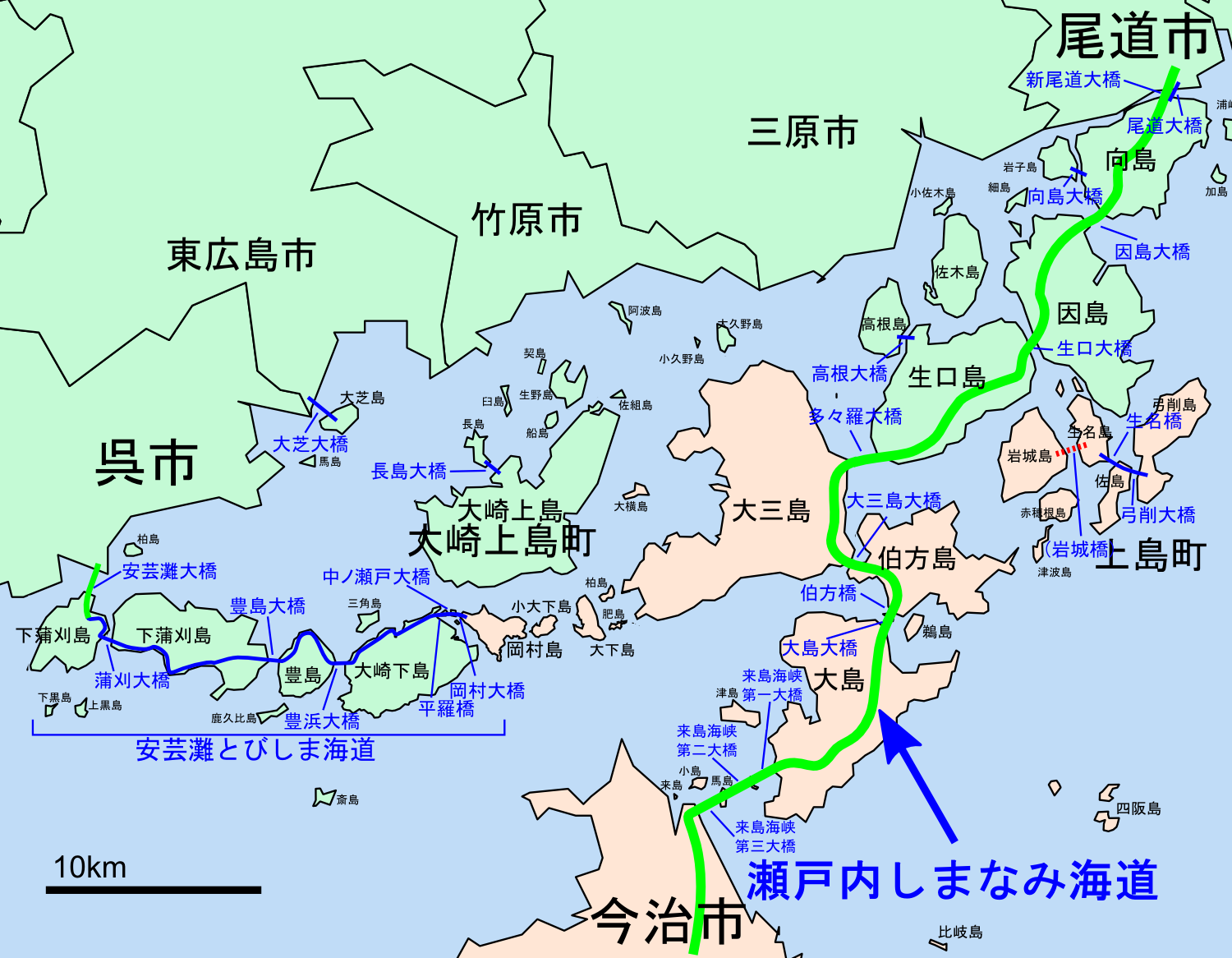

Route information
- Length: 59.4 km (36.9 mi)
- Existed: 1979–present
- Component highways: National Route 317

Major junctions
- From: Nishiseto Onomichi Interchange in Onomichi, Hiroshima; National Route 2
- To: Imabari Interchange in Imabari, Ehime; National Route 196

Location
- Country: Japan

Highway system
- National highways of Japan; Expressways of Japan

The Nishiseto Expressway (西瀬戸自動車道, Nishiseto Jidōsha-dō), often called the Shimanami Kaidō (しまなみ海道), is an expressway in Japan that connects Onomichi, Hiroshima and Imabari, Ehime, going through nine of the Geiyo Islands, including Ōshima, Ōmishima, and Innoshima. The road and multiple bridges crossing across the Seto Inland Sea is one of the three main transportation links of the Honshū–Shikoku Bridge Project, constructed between the islands of Honshu and Shikoku.

The expressway contains fifty-five bridges, including the Kurushima Kaikyō Bridge, the world's longest series of suspension bridges, and the Tatara Bridge, the world's fourth longest cable-stayed bridge. The route is famed for its scenic views and can be crossed by bicycles, mopeds and pedestrians as well as cars. It was opened on May 1, 1999, and is 59.4 kilometres (36.9 miles) long, sporting four lanes with a separated path for pedestrians and cyclists.

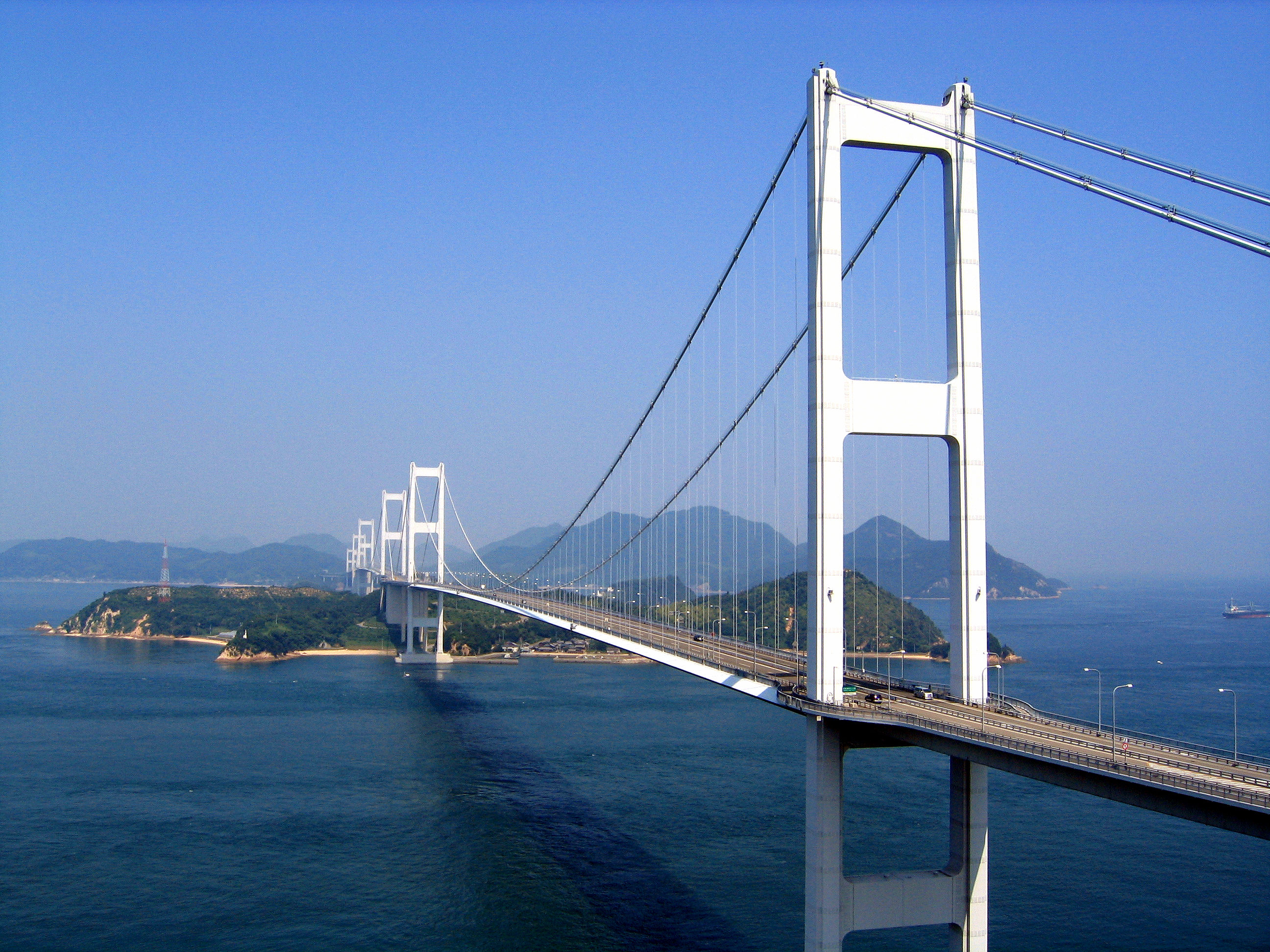
Kurushima Kaikyō Bridge

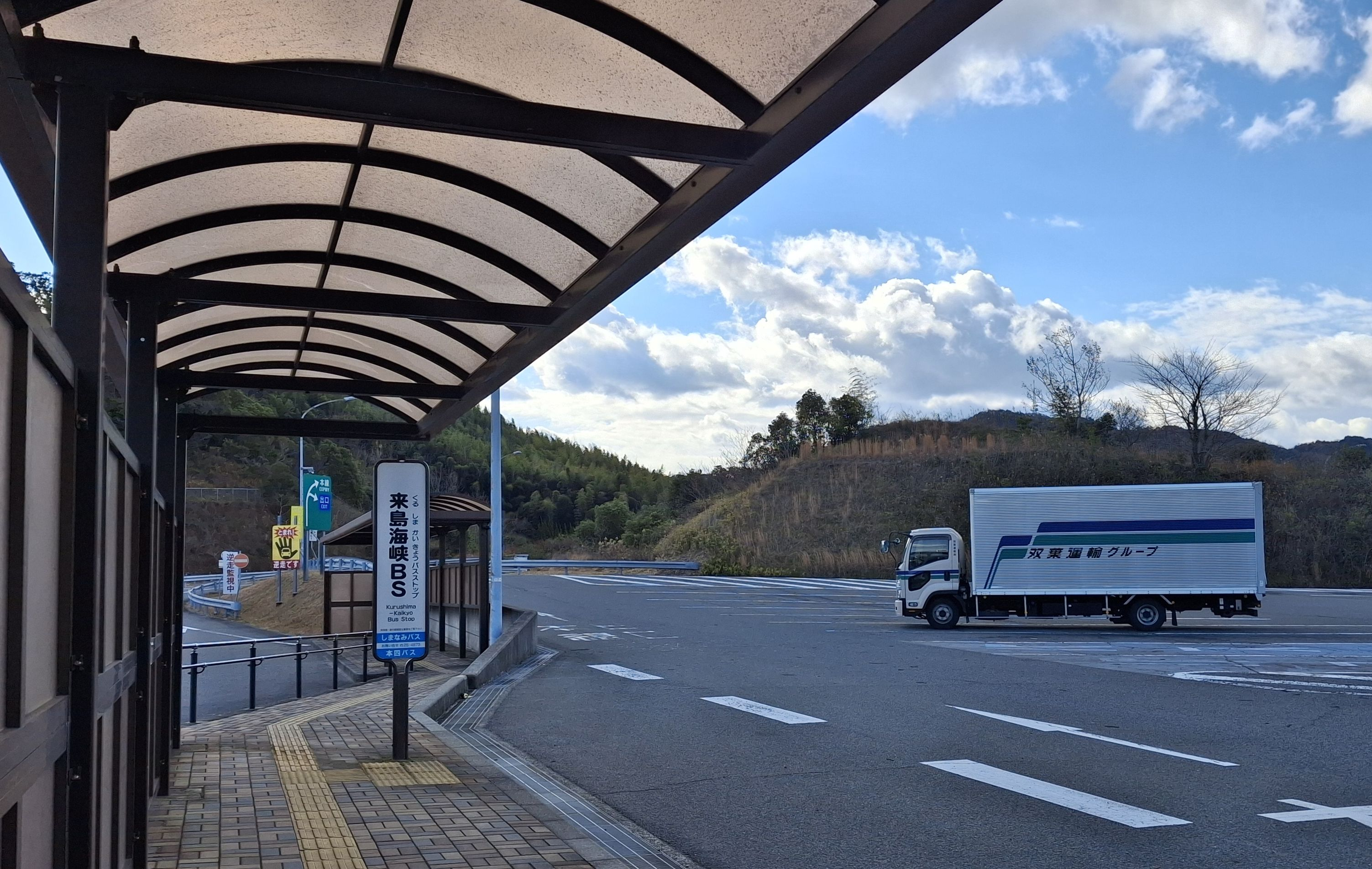
Kurushimakaikyo Service Area in Imabari, Ehime

== Cycle tourism ==
The road and bridge route was designed with an integrated cycle lane linking Onomichi in Hiroshima Prefecture with Imabari in Ehime Prefecture. The cycle route is approximately 70 kilometres (43 miles) in length, including bridge access ramps, and since opening has become one of Japan's most popular long-distance cycle routes.

As accessing the Shin-Onomichi bridge involves a steep climb, cyclists are encouraged to use a short ferry ride between Onomichi and Mukaishima, but all other bridges on the route feature a designated cycle path. Bicycle rental and drop off locations are available along the route.

The route is a toll road, though tolls had been waived for cyclists until March 31, 2028, in an effort to promote tourism. Although there are two other land connections between Shikoku and Honshu as well, Nishiseto Expressway is the only one that can be traversed on foot or by bicycle.

=== Gallery ===
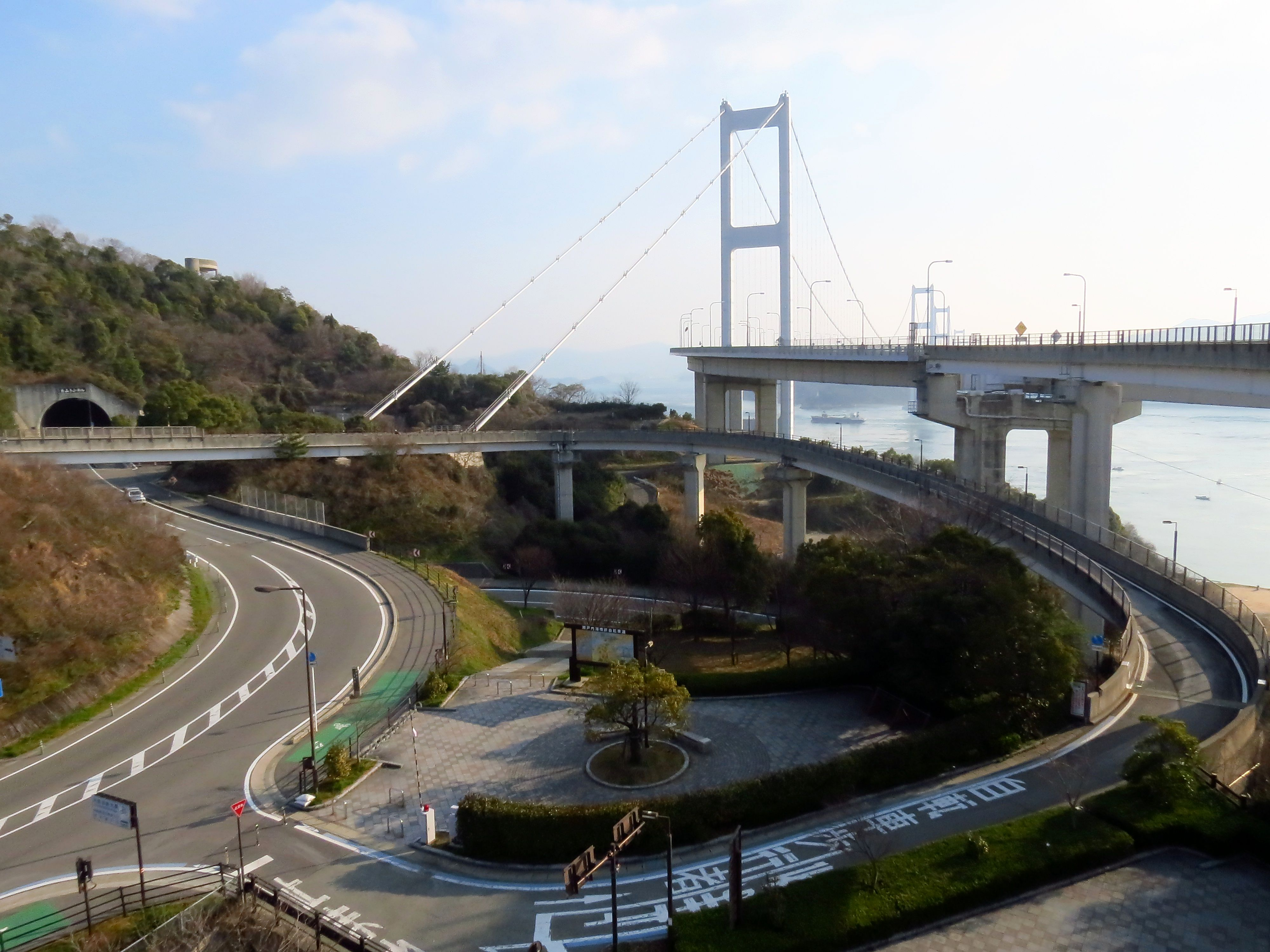
Cycle access ramp to the Kurushima-kaikyo Ohashi Bridge

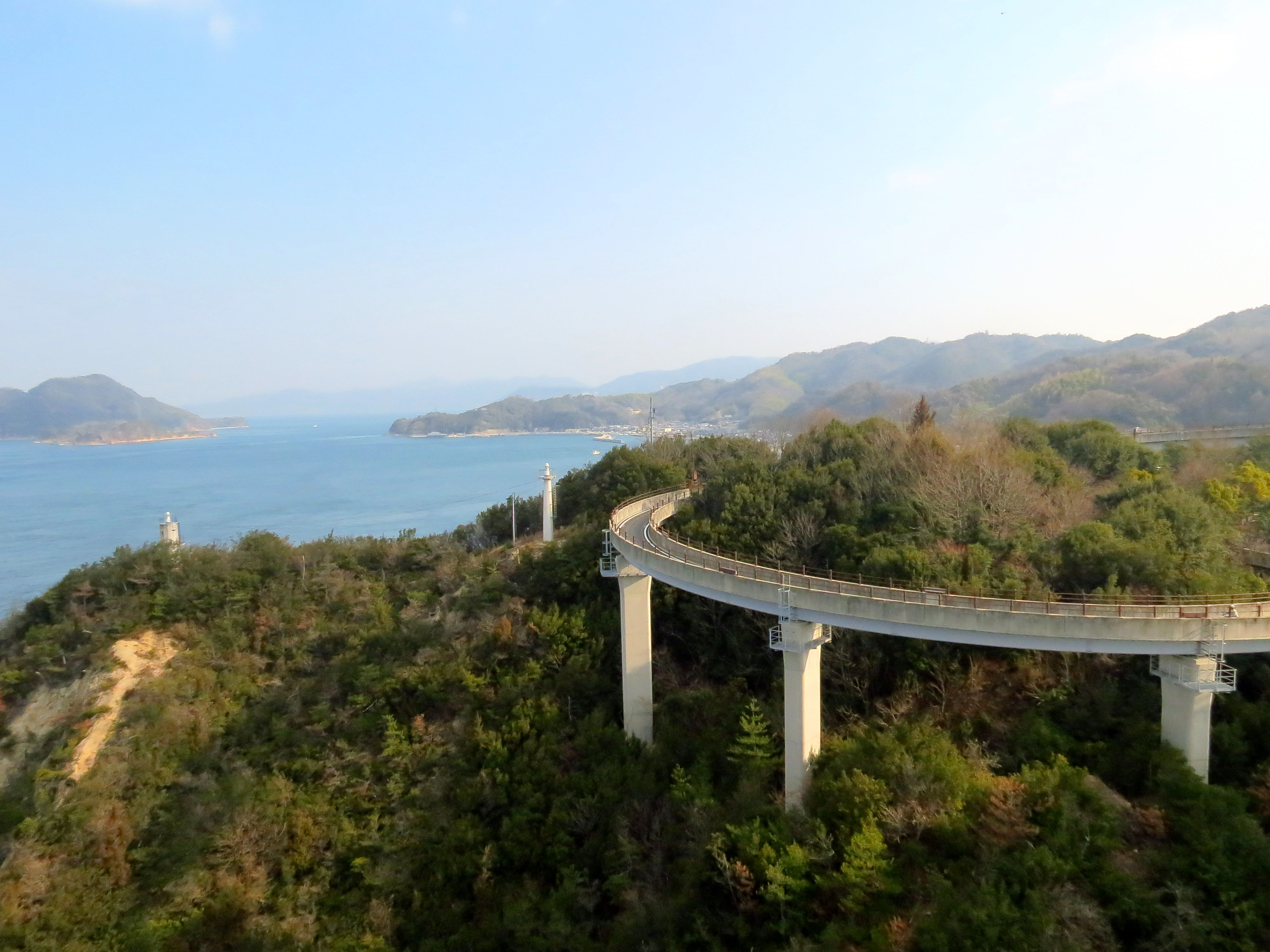
Shimanami Kaido cycle access ramp at Imabari

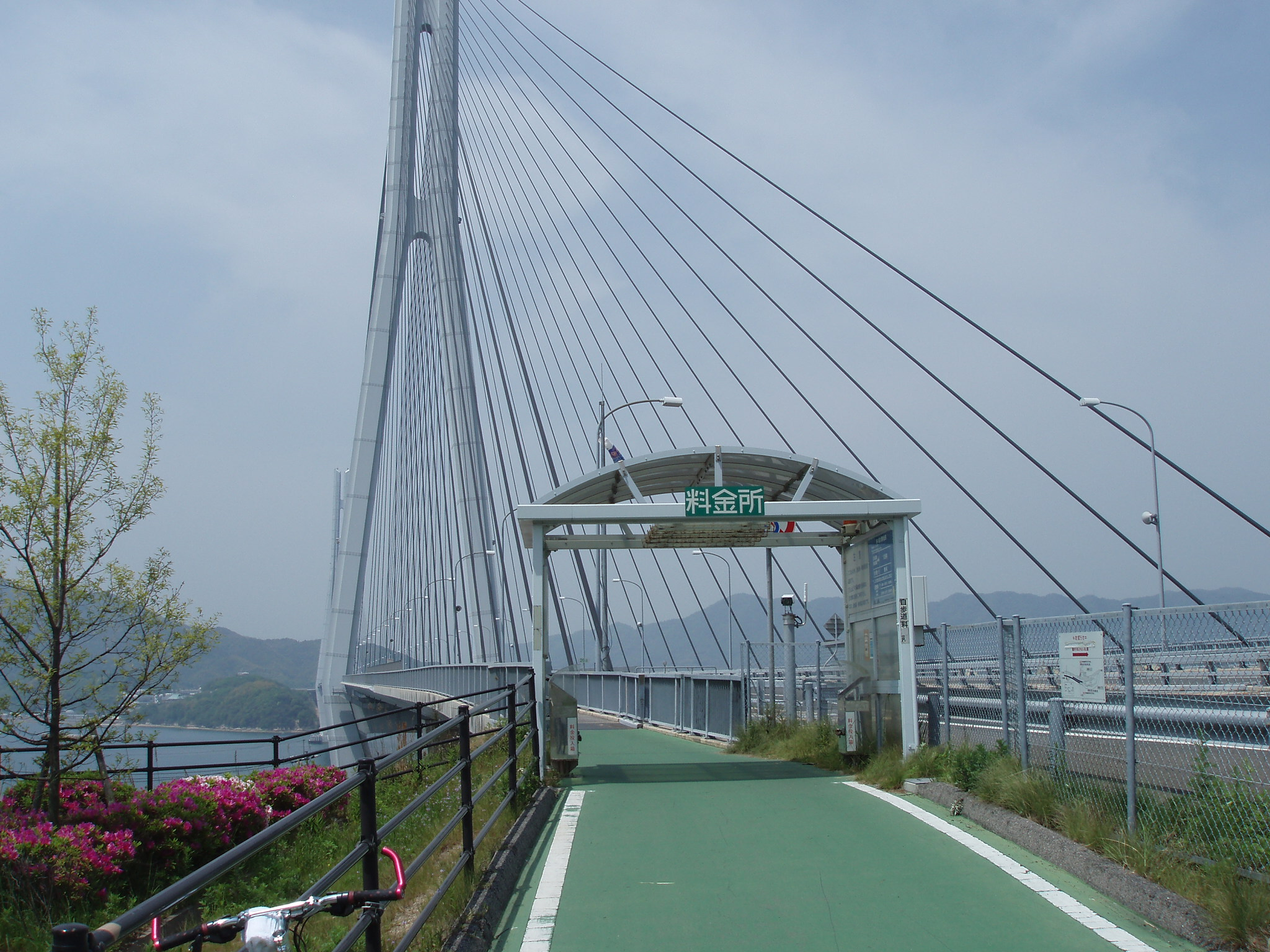
Designated cycle lane on the Tatara Bridge

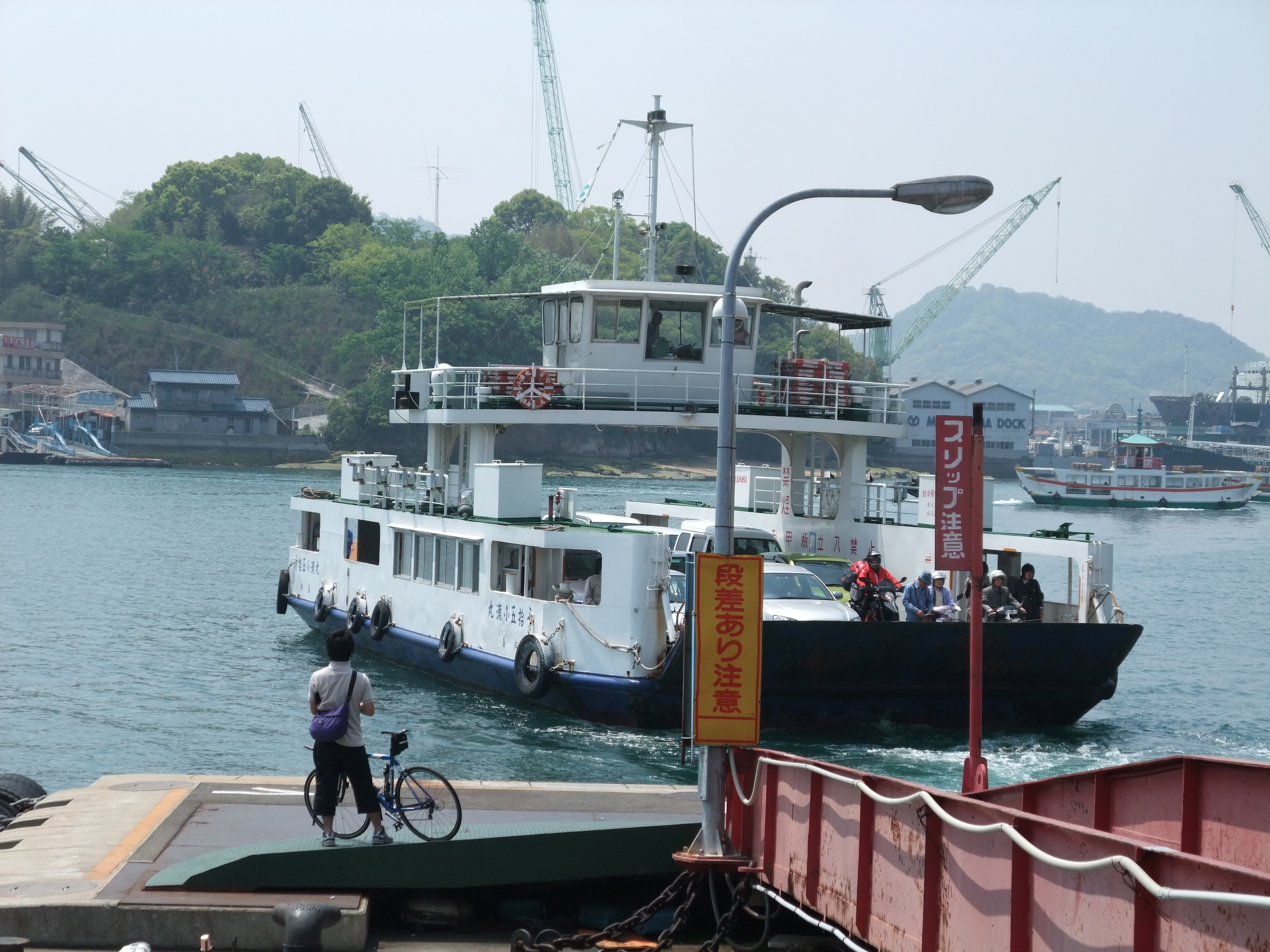
Onomichi ferry. Northern starting point of Shimanami Kaido cycle route.

== See also ==
- Expressways of Japan
- Honshū-Shikoku Bridge Project
