= Ōsakishimojima =

Island in Hiroshima, Japan

Ōsakishimojima Island
Native name: 大崎下島 Ōsakishimojima
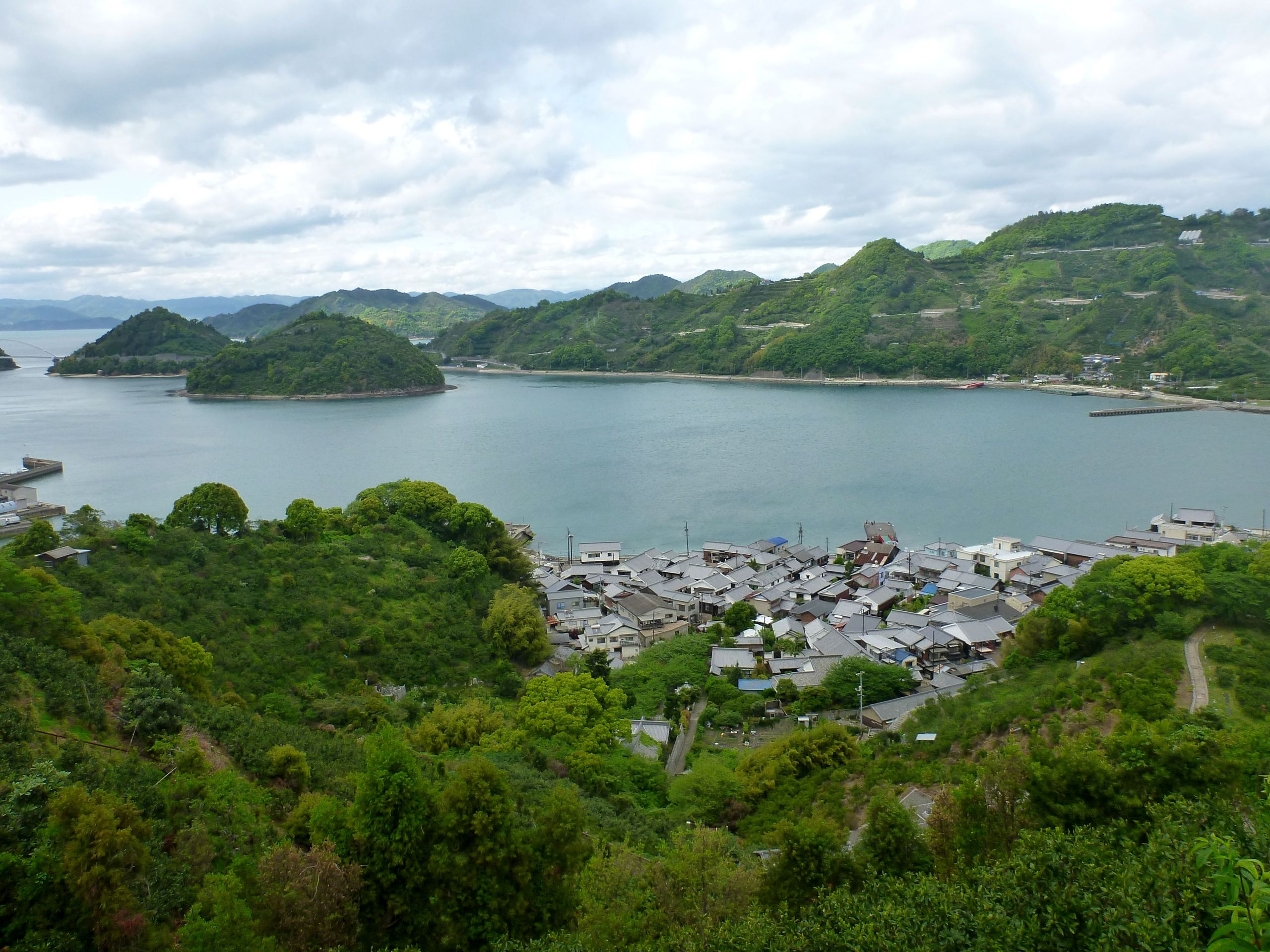
- The port of Mitarai

- Location within Japan

Geography
- Location: Seto Inland Sea
- Coordinates: 34°10′21″N 132°50′06″E
- Area: 17.82 km^{2} (6.88 sq mi)
- Coastline: 26.0 km (16.16 mi)
- Highest elevation: 449 m (1473 ft)
- Highest point: Mt. Ippōji (一峰寺山)

Administration
- Japan
- Prefecture: Hiroshima
- City: Kure

Demographics
- Ethnic groups: Japanese

Ōsakishimojima (大崎下島) is an island in the Geiyo Islands of the Seto Inland Sea, off the southern coast of Honshu in the prefecture of Hiroshima in Japan. The island is best known for the town of Mitarai (御手洗), an important port of call for ships during the Edo era.

== Geography ==
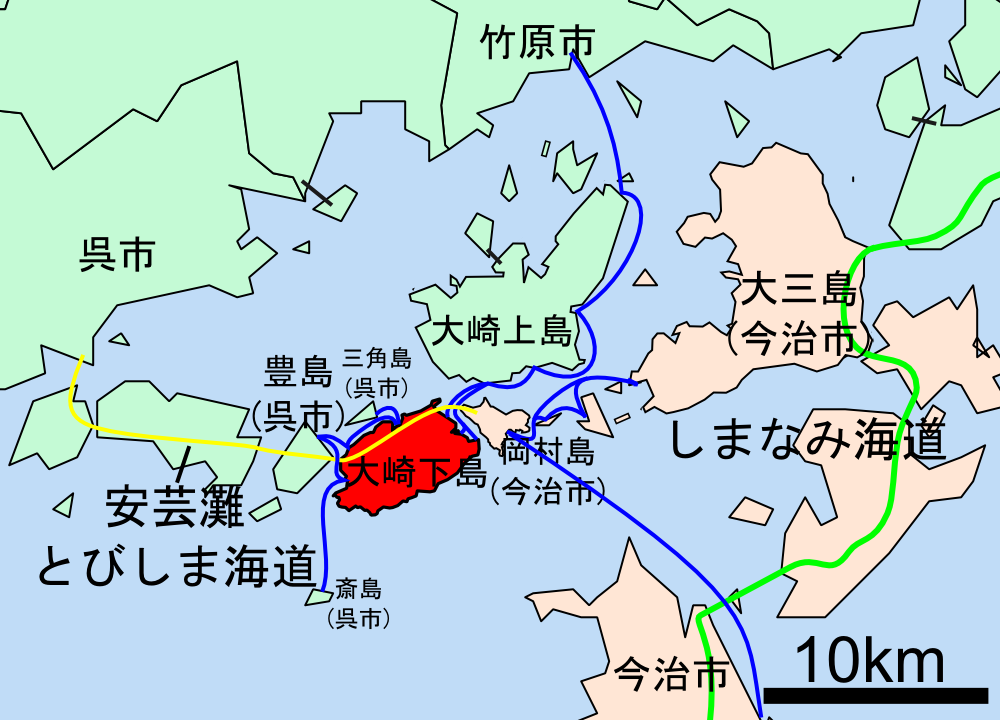
The location of Ōsakishimojima (in red)

Ōsakishimojima means "Lower Ōsaki Island". It is located south of Ōsakikamijima (Upper Osaki Island) and southwest of Okamura Island. The island is a leading production site of mandarin oranges in Hiroshima prefecture.

== History ==
With the development of the Western Circuit (西廻り航路, nishimawari kōro) shipping route through the Seto Inland Sea in the Edo period, the town of Mitarai grew as a port for ships waiting for rising tide or favourable winds. The Wakaebisuya chaya, the largest in the Inland Sea, employed over 100 women, and in The Inland Sea, Donald Richie states that the daimyo of Kumamoto once spent a thousand gold pieces in one night there. The town was also frequented by political figures travelling to and from Osaka and Edo. The Mitarai Treaty (御手洗条約, Mitarai jōyaku), a secret agreement between the provinces of Chōshū and Geishū to ally against the Tokugawa shogunate, was signed at Mitarai on 26 November 1867 and became a key event in the fall of the shogunate.

Today, the town includes gabled houses with sangawarabuki roofs and is dotted with Western-style houses. The port area retains its historical character with groynes, stepped piers and a lighthouse, and is gazetted as an Important Preservation District for Groups of Traditional Buildings.

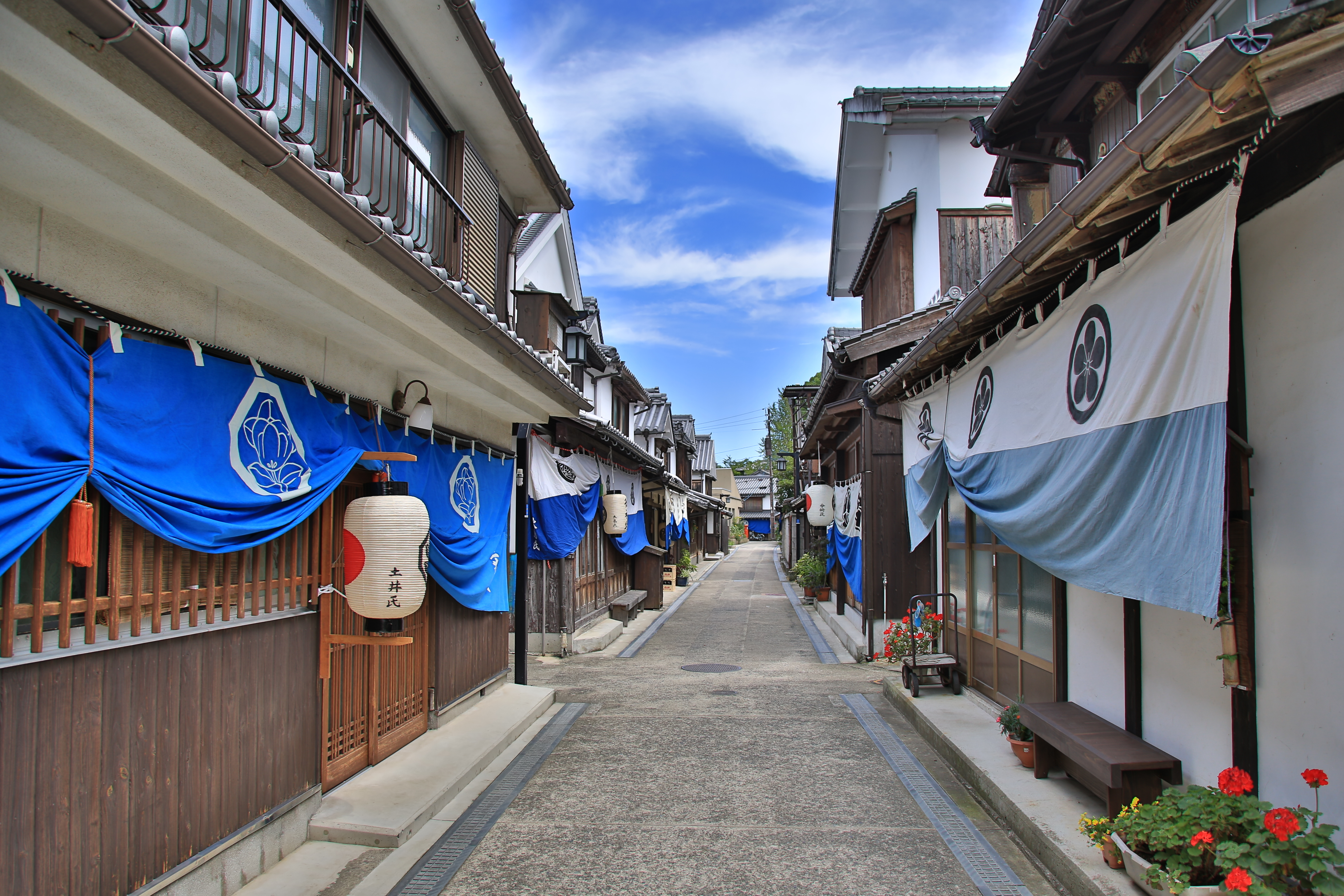
Street in the Mitarai Preservation District

Most of Ōsakishimojima was formerly administered by the town of Yutaka, with a small portion on the west coast in Toyohama. On March 20, 2005, both Yutaka and Toyohama, along with the towns of Ondo, Kurahashi and Kamagari (all from Aki District) and Yasuura (from Toyota District), were merged into the expanded city of Kure.

== Transportation ==
Ōsakishimojima is linked by the Akinada Tobishima Kaido road westwards to Toyoshima Island and onward via a series of bridges to the mainland of Honshu near the city of Kure, Hiroshima, as well as eastwards to Okamura Island, the current terminus of the Kaido.

Ferry services are also available to Ōsakikamijima. There have been plans since 1972 to replace this with a bridge, or alternatively build one to Ōmishima Island, but none have come to fruition.
