= Akinada Tobishima Kaido =

Road in Hiroshima Prefecture, Japan

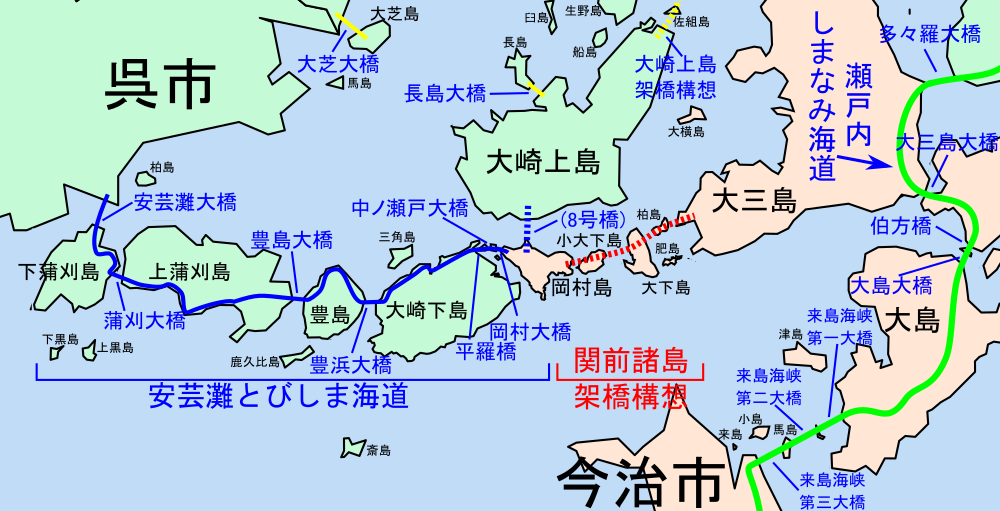
Map of Akinada Tobishima Kaido Solid blue line: operational (bridges 1–7) Dotted blue line: planned (bridge 8) Dotted red line: possible extension to Omishima Green line: Shimanami Kaido

The Akinada Tobishima Kaidō (安芸灘とびしま海道), officially the Akinada Islands Link Bridges (安芸灘諸島連絡架橋, Akinada-shotō-renraku-kakyō), is a road connecting Kure, Hiroshima to seven of the Geiyo Islands in the Seto Inland Sea, Japan.

== Route ==
The route spans 46.5 kilometres (28.9 miles), with a maximum altitude difference of 67 metres (220 feet). Along its length are seven bridges with a cumulative length of 5,300 m (17,400 ft), connecting the islands of Shimokamagari, Kamikamagari, Toyoshima, Ōsakishimojima, Herashima and Nakanoshima before terminating at Okamura Island. The seventh of the bridges, Okamura Bridge, crosses the border from Hiroshima Prefecture to Ehime Prefecture. The entire route has gentle gradients, marked cycle lanes and is equipped with five designated cycle stations, making this a popular cycling destination.

An eighth bridge connecting Okamura to Ōsakikamijima is planned, but construction has not started. An alternative series of bridges to Ōmishima Island has also been proposed. Currently, there are ferry services from Okamura to Ōmishima and the city of Imabari, Ehime in Shikoku.

== Nickname ==
After a public naming competition that received 3,118 entries, the route was given the official nickname Akinada Tobishima Kaidō in 2008. Akinada (Aki Sea) is the open expanse west of the Geiyo Islands, while tobishima comes from tobi-ishi (飛び石), the Japanese name for stepping stones in a garden. The route is also unofficially known as the Ura-Shimanami Kaidō (裏しまなみ海道) after the nearby Shimanami Kaido expressway, which connects Onomichi (Hiroshima) and Imabari (Ehime), going through nine of the Geiyo Islands, including Ōshima, Ōmishima, and Innoshima.

== Bridges ==
| Name | | Japanese | Connecting | Opened | Length | Type | Notes | |
|---|---|---|---|---|---|---|---|---|
| 1 | Akinada Bridge | 安芸灘大橋 | Honshu - Shimokamagari | 18 Jan 2000 | 1175 m | Three-span, two-hinge suspension bridge | | |
| 2 | Kamagari Bridge | 蒲刈大橋 | Shimokamagari - Kamikamagari | October 1979 | 480 m | Three-span two-continuous truss bridge | | |
| 3 | Toyoshima Bridge | 豊島大橋 | Kamikamagari - Toyoshima | 18 Nov 2008 | 903 m | Single span suspension bridge | Also known as Abi Bridge (アビ大橋) | |
| 4 | Toyohama Bridge | 豊浜大橋 | Toyoshima-Osakishimojima | 30 Nov 1992 | 543 m | Three-span continuous truss bridge | | |
| 5 | Heira Bridge | 平羅橋 | Osakishimojima - Herashima | 1995 | 98.5 m | Cable-stayed bridge | Also known as the "Orange Line" (オレンジライン) | |
| 6 | Nakanoseto Bridge | 中の瀬戸大橋 | Herashima - Nakanoshima | 6 November 1998 | 251 m | Arch bridge | Also known as the "Orange Line" (オレンジライン) | |
| 7 | Okamura Bridge | 岡村大橋 | Nakanoshima - Okamura Island | 1995 | 228 m | Arch bridge | Also known as the "Orange Line" (オレンジライン) | Future connection planned to Ōmishima Island |
| 8 | （planned） | | Okamura Island - Osakikamijima | - | - | - | Planning phase, no date for start of construction | |

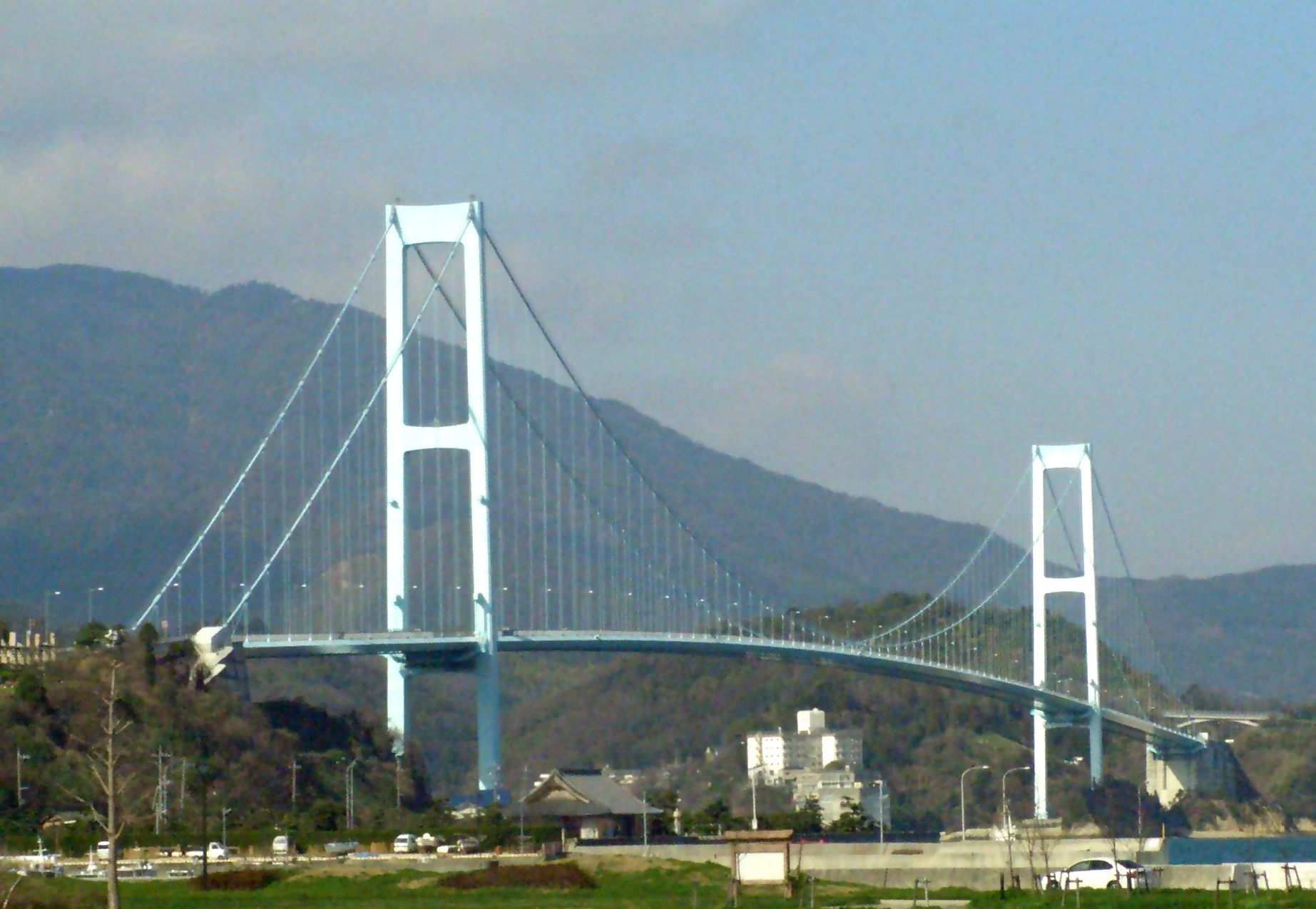
Akinada Bridge

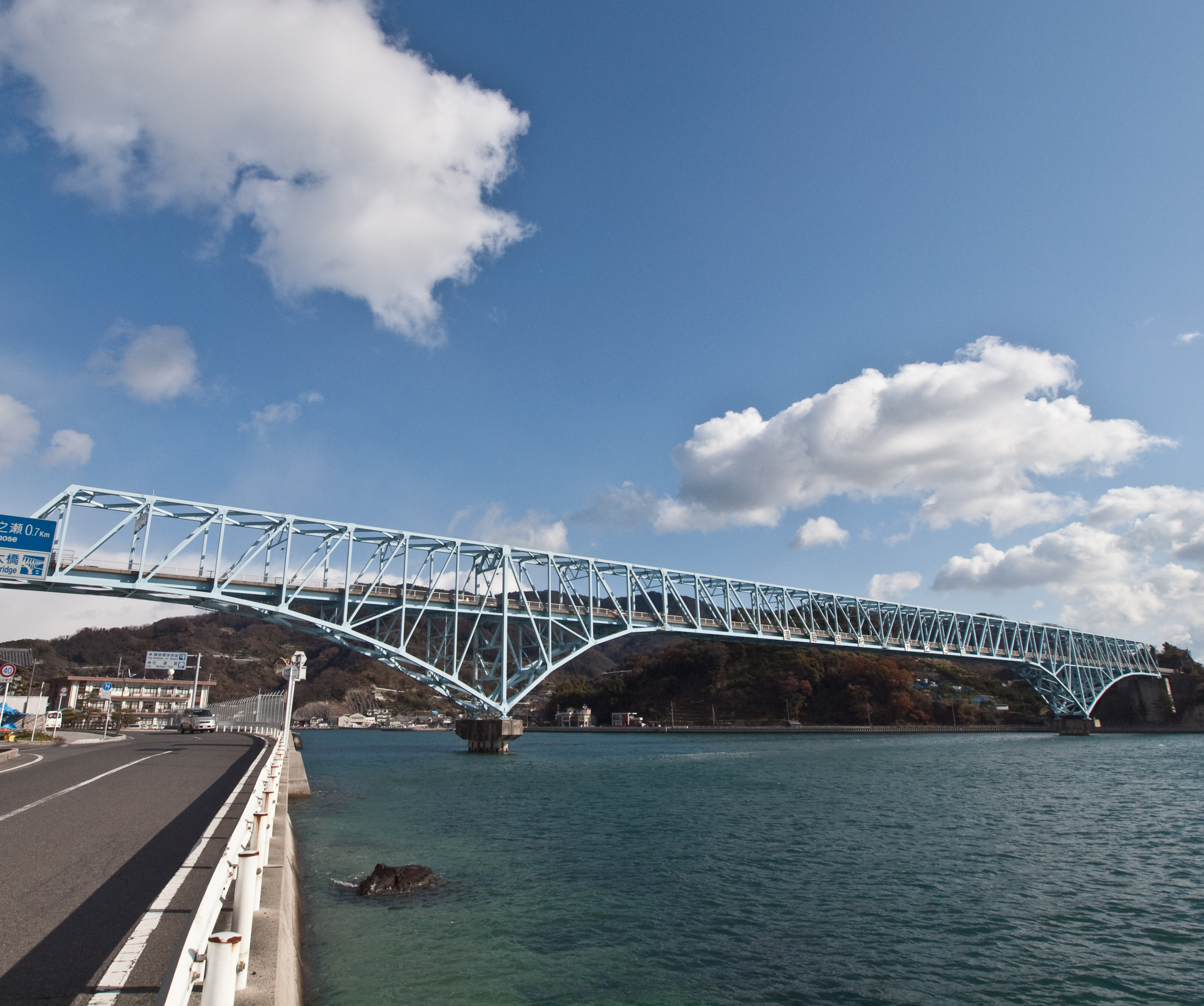
Kamagari Bridge

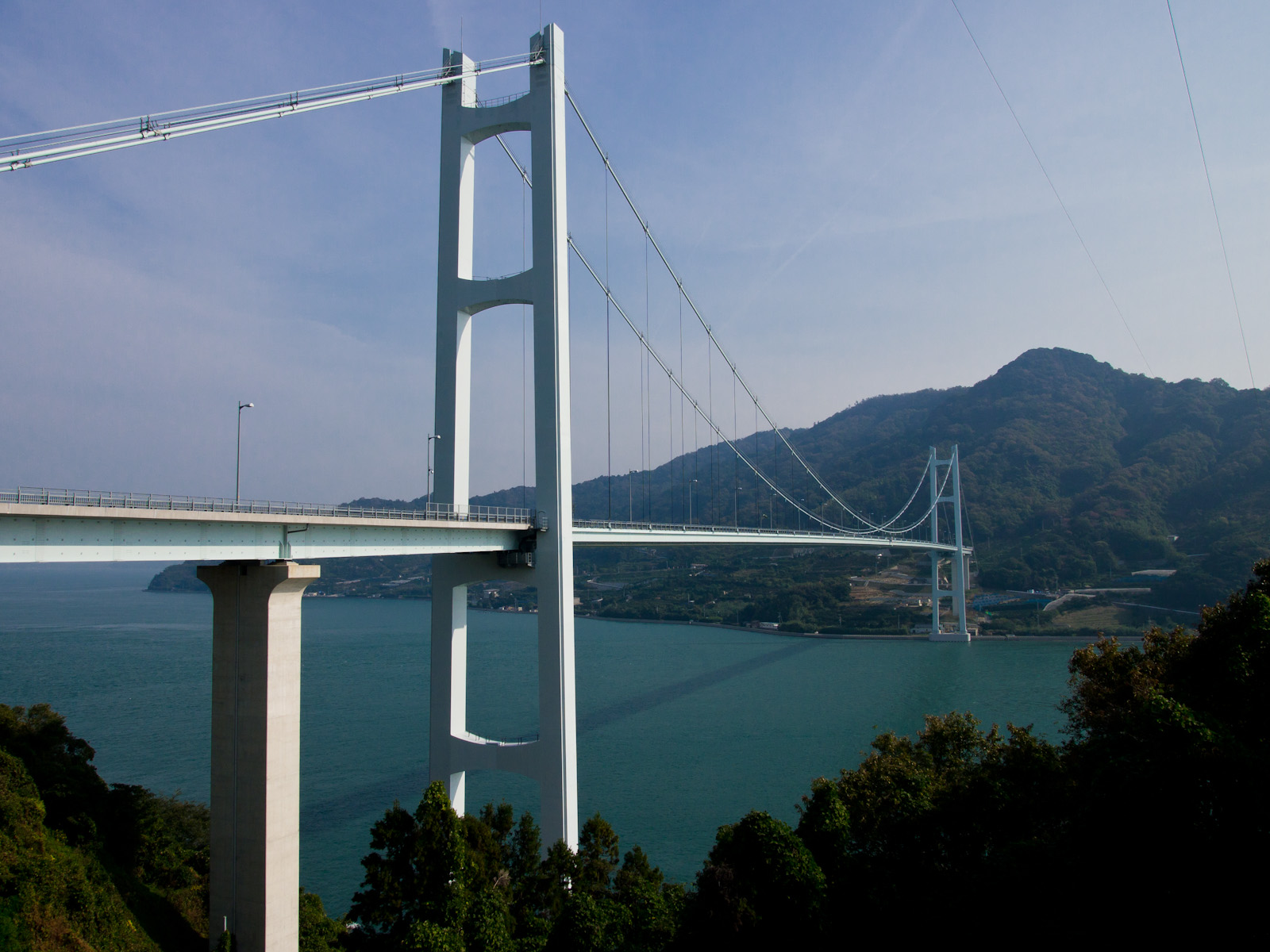
Toyoshima Bridge

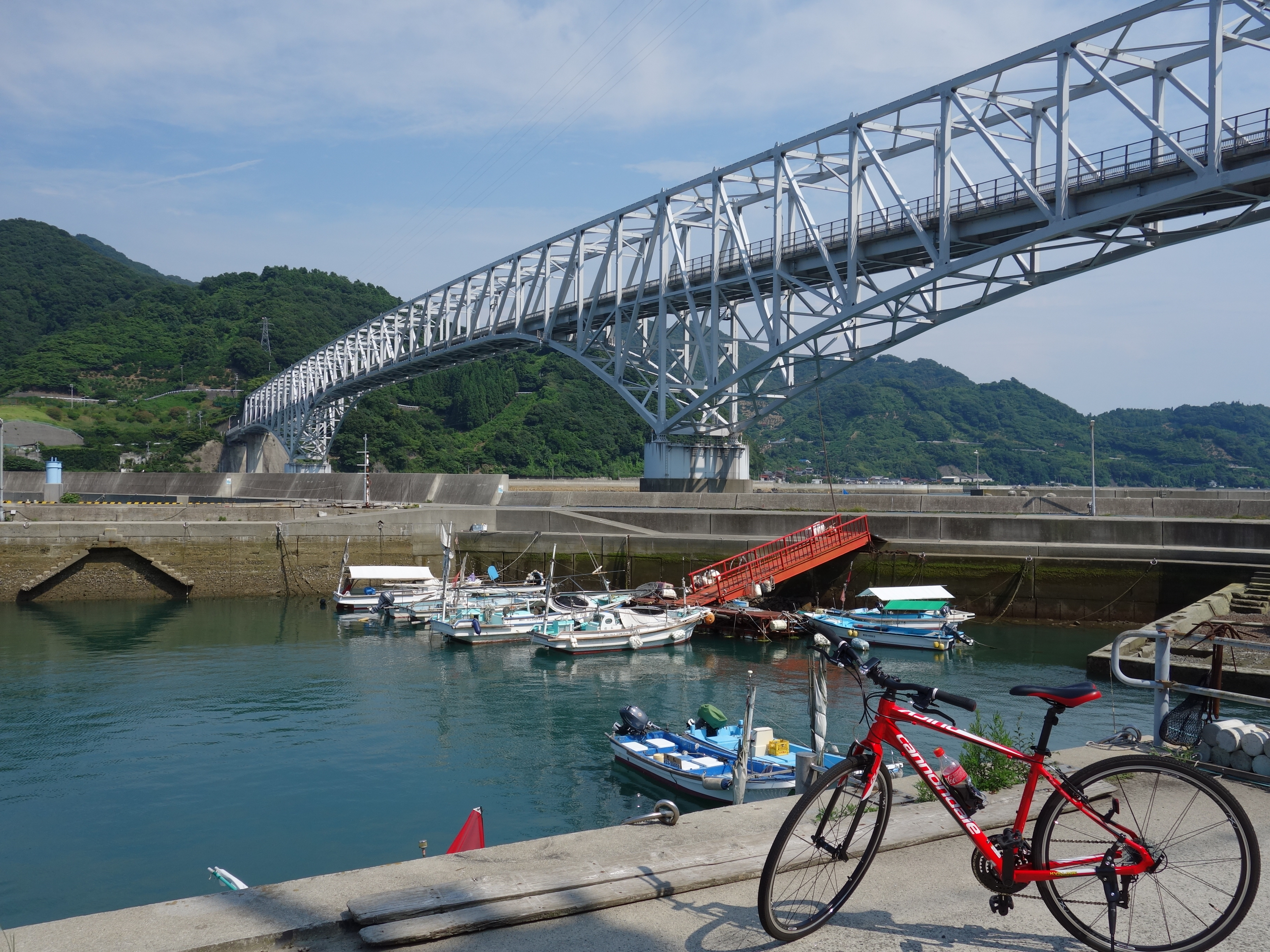
Toyohama Bridge

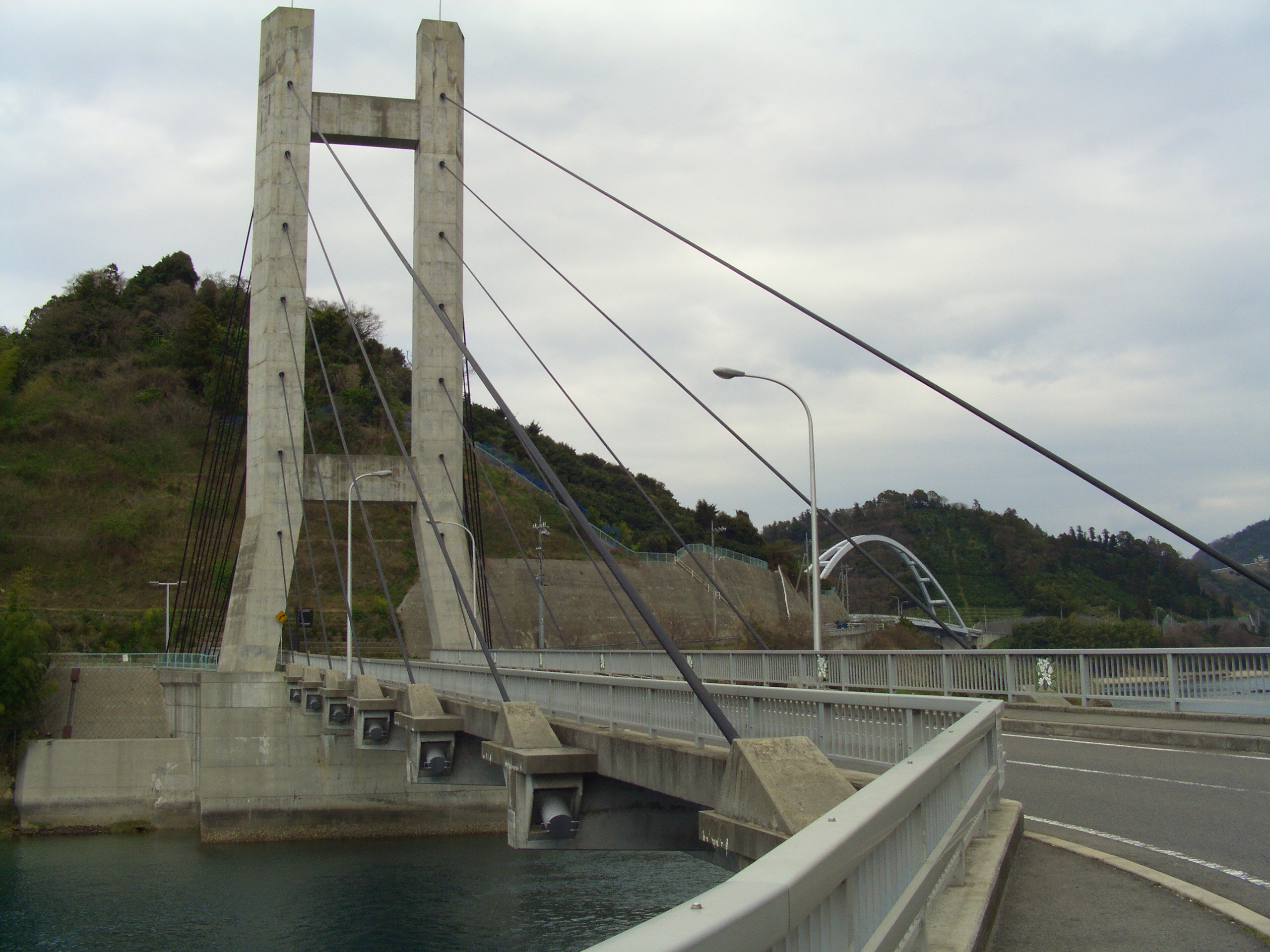
Heira Bridge

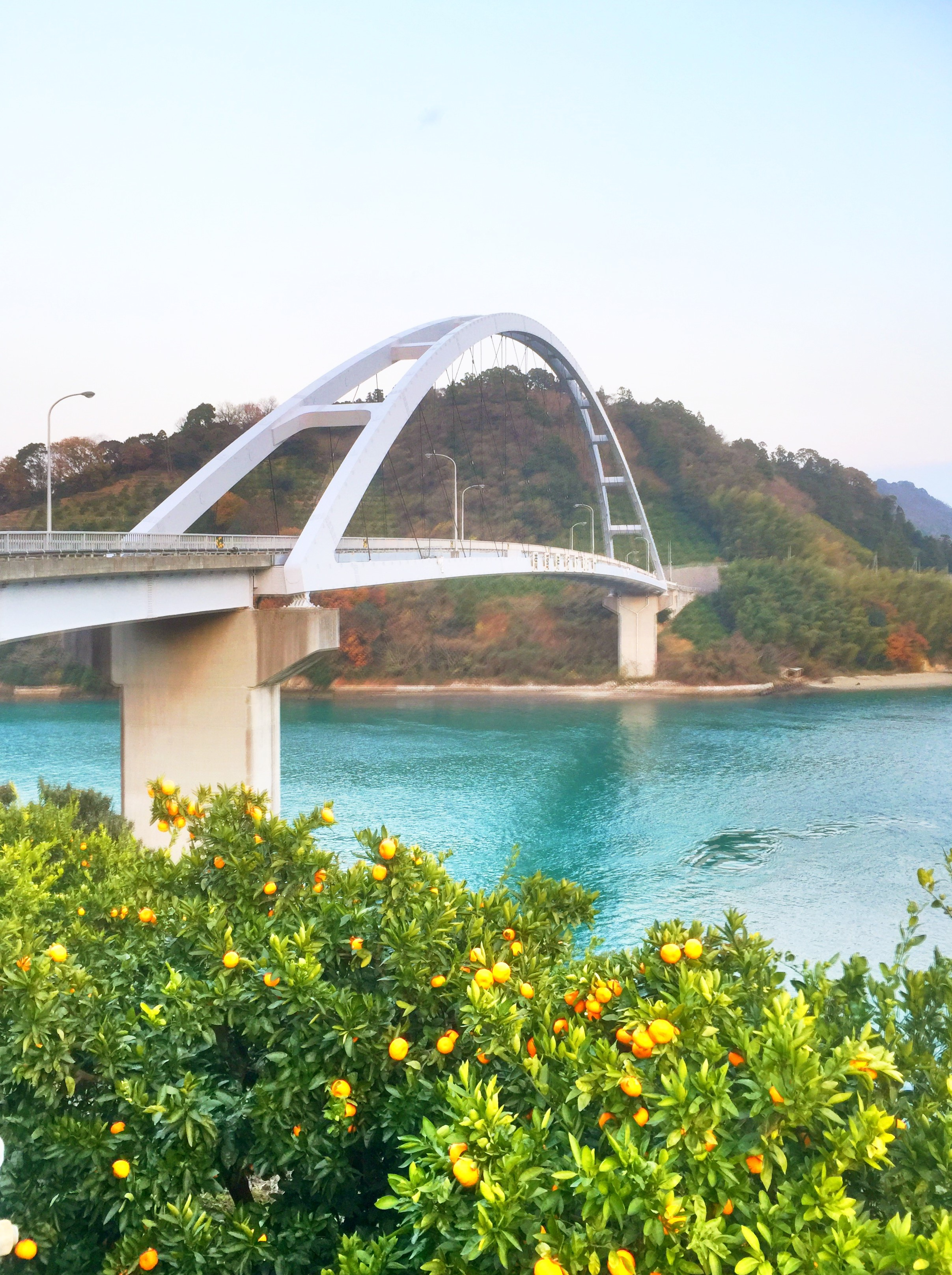
Nakanoseto Bridge

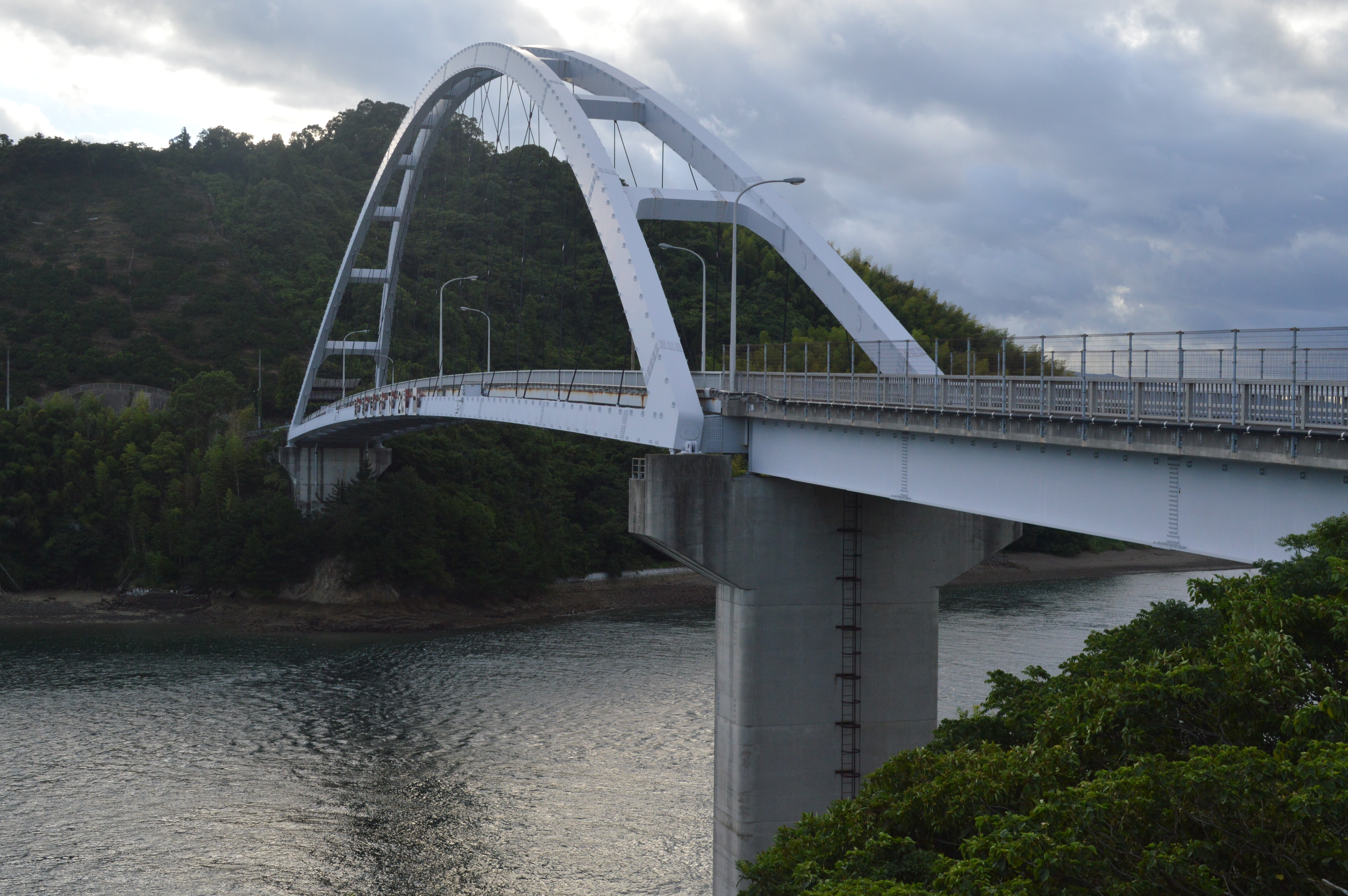
Okamura Bridge
