= Ōsakikamijima, Hiroshima =

Ōsakikamijima 大崎上島町
- Town
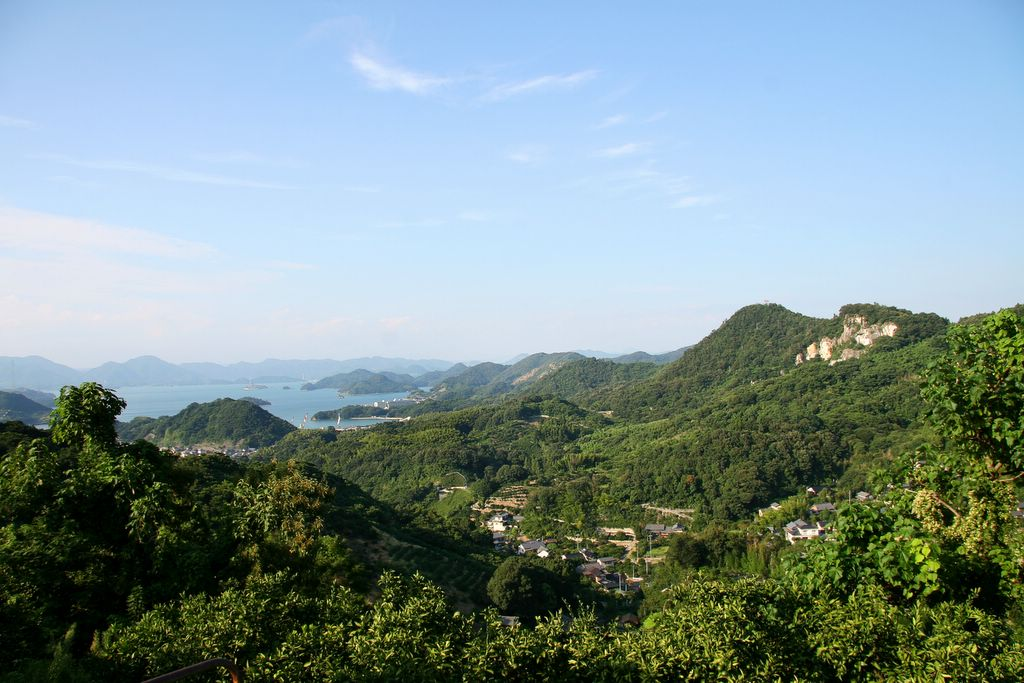

- Flag seal

- Location of Ōsakikamijima in Hiroshima Prefecture

- Location in Japan
- Coordinates: 34°16′N 132°55′E
- Country: Japan
- Region: Chūgoku; San'yō
- Prefecture: Hiroshima Prefecture
- District: Toyota

Area
  - Total: 43.24 km^{2} (16.70 sq mi)

Population (31 March 2024)
  - Total: 6,744
  - Density: 156.0/km^{2} (404.0/sq mi)
- Time zone: UTC+09:00 (JST)
- Website: www.town.osakikamijima.hiroshima.jp

Ōsakikamijima (大崎上島町, Ōsakikamijima-chō) is a town located in Toyota District, Hiroshima Prefecture, Japan.

Ōsakikamijima is coterminous with the island of the same name, which is one of the Geiyo Islands of the Seto Inland Sea between Hiroshima Prefecture and Ehime Prefecture.

The new town of Ōsakikamijima was formed on 1 April 2003, with the merger of the towns of Ōsaki, Higashino and Kinoe, all from Toyota District.

As of 31 March 2024, the town of Ōsakikamijima had an estimated population of 6,744 and a density of 160 persons per km^{2}. The total area is 43.24 km^{2}.

== Transportation ==
Ōsakikamijima is the largest island in Hiroshima Prefecture, yet has no fixed links to other islands or the mainland. A bridge to the nearby Ōsakishimojima, which is linked with the mainland via the Akinada Tobishima Kaido, has been planned since 1972 but construction is yet to start. There are ferry services to Ōsakishimojima, Ōmishima Island, Takehara (Honshu) and Imabari (Shikoku).

== Education ==
Elementary School

- Osaki Elementary School
- Higashino Elementary School
- Kinoe Elementary School

Junior High School

- Ōsakikamijima Junior High School
- Hiroshima Global Academy (Junior high school)

High School

- Ōsaki Kaisei High School
- Hiroshima Global Academy (High school)

Technical Junior College

- Hiroshima National College of Maritime Technology

Recently, with the gradual migration of youth out of Osakikamijima, three of the elementary schools were combined to make Osakikamijima Elementary. All of the junior high schools were combined to make Osakikamijima Junior High. Osakikamijima has lots of schools compared with its population, therefore Osakikamijima is called "The island of education". Hiroshima Global Academy is the newest school in Osakikamijima, it was opened in 2019. It's famous of education of English with IB, across Hiroshima prefecture.
