= Ikuchijima =

Island in Onomichi, Hiroshima

Native name: 生口島 Ikuchijima
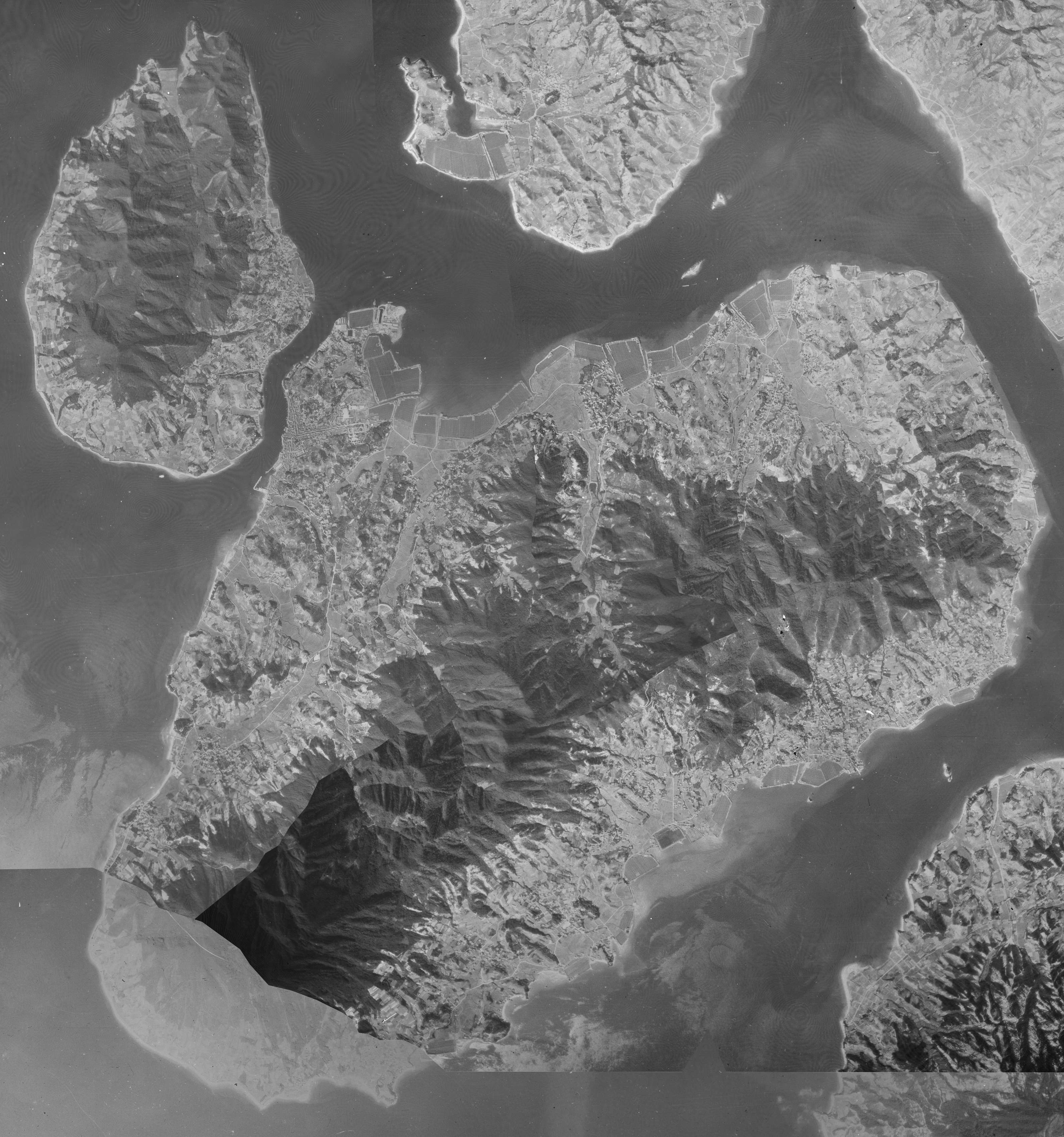
- Aerial photo of Ikuchijima in 1947

- Location within Japan Location within Hiroshima Prefecture

Geography
- Location: Seto Inland Sea
- Coordinates: 34°17′15.2″N 133°6′28.6″E
- Archipelago: Geiyo Islands
- Area: 31.21 km^{2} (12.05 sq mi)
- Length: 8.8 km (5.47 mi)
- Width: 4.9 km (3.04 mi)
- Coastline: 24 km (14.9 mi)
- Highest elevation: 472.3 m (1549.5 ft)
- Highest point: Mount Kanno

Administration
- Japan
- Prefecture: Hiroshima Prefecture
- City: Onomichi

Demographics
- Population: 11000 (2006)
- Pop. density: 352/km^{2} (912/sq mi)
- Ethnic groups: Japanese

Ikuchijima (生口島) is one of the Geiyo Islands in the Seto Inland Sea, belonging to Hiroshima Prefecture in Japan. Ikuchijima is administered as part of Onomichi city. There are bridges connecting Ikuchijima to the mainland (Honshū) via Innoshima and to Shikoku via Ōmishima Island. The highest peak of this 31.21 km^{2} island is Mount Kanno at 472.3 m (1,550 ft).

The Wajinden (c. 290) notes that slaves (生口) were kept in the area and the island's name may come from this. In The Inland Sea, Donald Richie describes the island as “a smaller Sardinia, a greener Corsica”. The main crop on Ikuchijima today is citrus, and the island is now known as "lemon island of Japan".

== History ==
- April 1, 1889, Ikuchijima was formally demarcated into Nishiikuchi-gun, Kitaikuchi-gun, Myōga-gun and Minamiikuchi-gun
- April 1, 1937, Nishiikuchi-gun merged into Setoda.
- April 1, 1944, Kitaikuchi-gun and Myōga-gun merged into Setoda.
- April 1, 1955, Minamiikuchi-gun merged into Setoda.
- July 27, 1970, Bridge connection to Takane Island opened.
- December 8, 1991, Bridge connection to Innoshima and Ōmishima.
- January 10, 2006, Setoda, along with the city of Innoshima, was merged into the expanded city of Onomichi

== Attractions ==
- Kōsan-ji temple
- Outdoor island-wide monument park
- Hiking and cycling routes
- Sunset-view beach hotels
- Lemon orchards - Ikuchijima is known as "Lemon Island" in Japan.

== Climate ==
Climate data for Ikuchi-jima (1991−2020 normals, extremes 1979−present)
Month	Jan	Feb	Mar	Apr	May	Jun	Jul	Aug	Sep	Oct	Nov	Dec	Year
Record high °C (°F)	16.4 (61.5)	20.4 (68.7)	22.2 (72.0)	27.5 (81.5)	32.0 (89.6)	34.2 (93.6)	36.0 (96.8)	37.5 (99.5)	36.0 (96.8)	33.0 (91.4)	23.9 (75.0)	20.9 (69.6)	37.5 (99.5)
Mean daily maximum °C (°F)	9.5 (49.1)	9.9 (49.8)	13.0 (55.4)	18.1 (64.6)	22.9 (73.2)	26.0 (78.8)	30.0 (86.0)	31.9 (89.4)	28.3 (82.9)	22.8 (73.0)	17.2 (63.0)	11.9 (53.4)	20.1 (68.2)
Daily mean °C (°F)	5.7 (42.3)	5.8 (42.4)	8.6 (47.5)	13.4 (56.1)	18.1 (64.6)	21.8 (71.2)	25.9 (78.6)	27.5 (81.5)	24.1 (75.4)	18.6 (65.5)	12.9 (55.2)	8.0 (46.4)	15.9 (60.6)
Mean daily minimum °C (°F)	1.6 (34.9)	1.3 (34.3)	3.8 (38.8)	8.5 (47.3)	13.4 (56.1)	18.2 (64.8)	22.5 (72.5)	24.0 (75.2)	20.6 (69.1)	14.6 (58.3)	8.7 (47.7)	3.8 (38.8)	11.8 (53.2)
Record low °C (°F)	−4.7 (23.5)	−6.3 (20.7)	−4.0 (24.8)	−1.2 (29.8)	3.4 (38.1)	9.8 (49.6)	15.6 (60.1)	17.4 (63.3)	11.4 (52.5)	4.7 (40.5)	−0.6 (30.9)	−3.0 (26.6)	−6.3 (20.7)
Average precipitation mm (inches)	39.5 (1.56)	49.7 (1.96)	84.4 (3.32)	88.9 (3.50)	108.3 (4.26)	172.3 (6.78)	177.6 (6.99)	89.5 (3.52)	126.8 (4.99)	95.9 (3.78)	59.2 (2.33)	46.2 (1.82)	1,138.4 (44.82)
Average precipitation days (≥ 1.0 mm)	5.3	6.9	9.2	9.1	8.5	10.8	9.1	6.2	8.5	7.0	6.2	6.3	93.1
Mean monthly sunshine hours	141.9	140.1	177.0	192.1	206.5	149.7	189.9	220.7	163.7	169.8	146.2	140.8	2,047.1
Source: Japan Meteorological Agency

== See also ==
- This article incorporates material from Japanese Wikipedia page 生口島, accessed 11 June 2018
