= Hyōtanjima =

Island in Seto Inland Sea

Native name: 瓢箪島
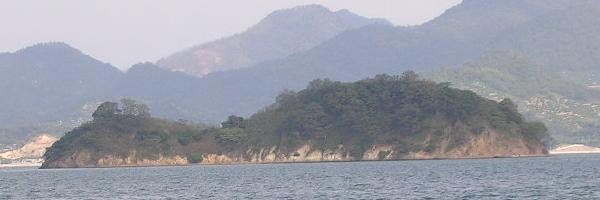

- Location within Japan Location within Ehime Prefecture Location within Hiroshima Prefecture

Geography
- Location: Seto Inland Sea
- Coordinates: 34.2849°N 133.0503°E
- Archipelago: Geiyo Islands
- Total islands: 1
- Area: 17,576 m^{2} (189,190 sq ft)
- Coastline: 700 m (2300 ft)
- Highest elevation: 35.2 m (115.5 ft)

Administration
- Japan
- Prefecture: Hiroshima Prefecture
- City: Onomichi
- District: Setoda-cho
- Prefecture: Ehime Prefecture
- City: Imabari
- District: Kamiura-cho

Demographics
- Population: 0

Hyōtanjima (Japanese: 瓢箪島) is an uninhabited island in the Geiyo Islands chain in the Seto Inland Sea, in Japan. The island is split between Hiroshima Prefecture and Ehime Prefecture at a point where it is 74 metres (243 ft) wide, the country's shortest prefectural border.

== Etymology ==
The name Hyōtanjima (瓢箪島) literally translates to "calabash island", which refers to its shape.

== Geography ==
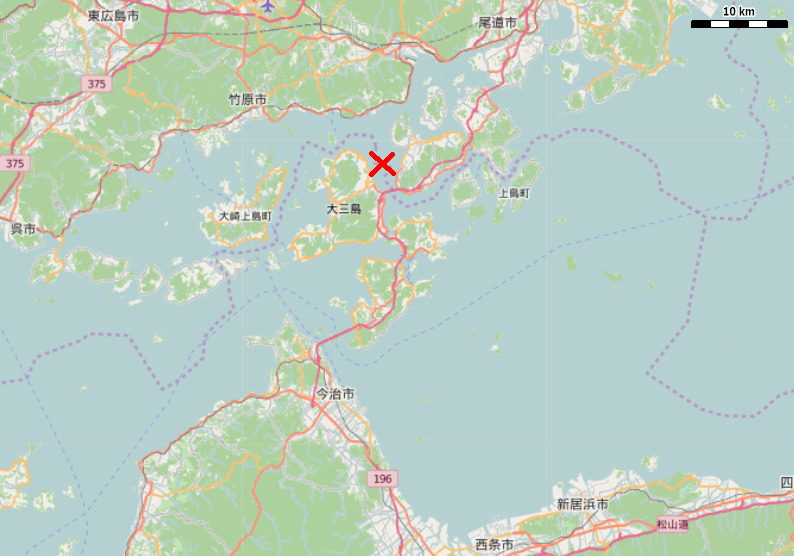
Location of Hyōtanjima in the Geiyo Islands

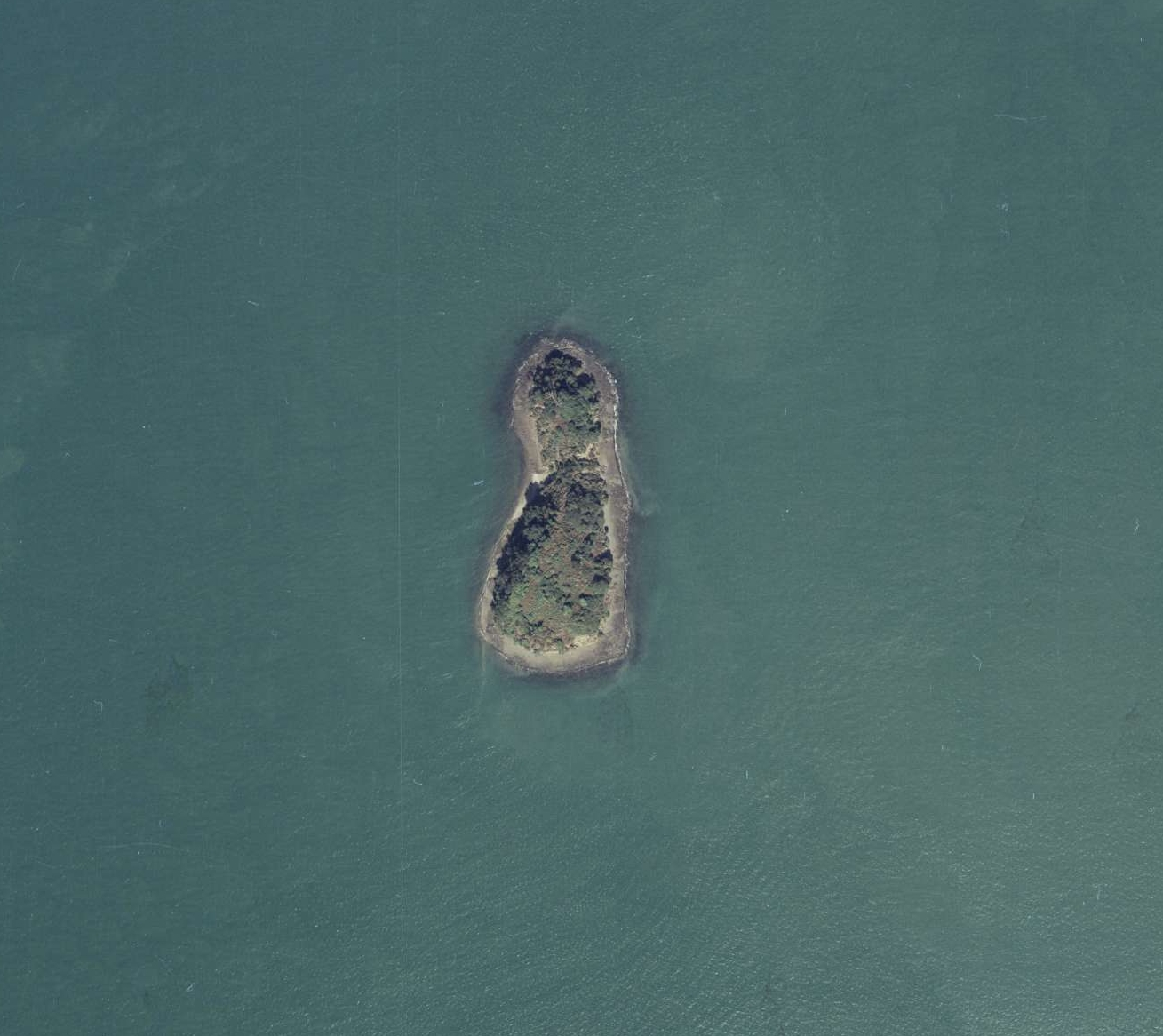
Aerial image of Hyōtanjima

Hyōtanjima is a calabash-shaped island located in the Seto Inland Sea, and is part of the Geiyo Islands chain. It is 2 kilometres (1.2 mi) east of Ōmishima Island in Ehime, and about the same distance west of Ikuchijima Island in Hiroshima. It has a circumference of 700 metres (2,300 ft) and an area of 17,576 square metres (4.34 acres), and there are two hills on the island, one in the north and one in the south. The higher of the two hills is 35.2 metres (115 ft) above sea level.

Five of the islands in the Seto Inland Sea are split by prefecture borders, including this one. The north end of Hyōtanjima is part of Tarumi, Setoda-cho in Onomichi, Hiroshima, while the south end belongs to Iguchi, Kamiura-cho in Imabari, Ehime. The border is around 74 metres (243 ft) long, considerably shorter than the next shortest prefecture borders the Tochigi–Saitama border and the Okayama–Kagawa border, which are 3.5 kilometres (2.2 mi) and 3.2 kilometres (2.0 mi) respectively.

== Legend ==
According to a local legend, the kami of Ikuchijima and the kami of Ōmishima Island became engaged in a tug of war when they each tried to grab Hyōtanjima for themselves; seeing this, the people worried that Hyōtanjima was being stretched out of shape, and reconciled with each other to end the conflict. The legend is believed to have originated from disputes over fishing rights, and boundary stones from the Meiji era remain on the island as evidence of numerous attempts to resolve them.

== History ==
The Murakami pirates are known to have roamed Hyōtanjima. It was designated as a National Monument as a Place of Scenic Beauty on November 16, 2012.

== In popular culture ==
The island served as one of the inspirations for the 1964 NHK drama Hyokkori Hyotanjima.

== See also ==
- List of Registered Monuments (Japan)
- Tochigi–Gunma–Saitama border
