= Innoshima =

Island in Hiroshima Prefecture, Japan

Native name: 因島
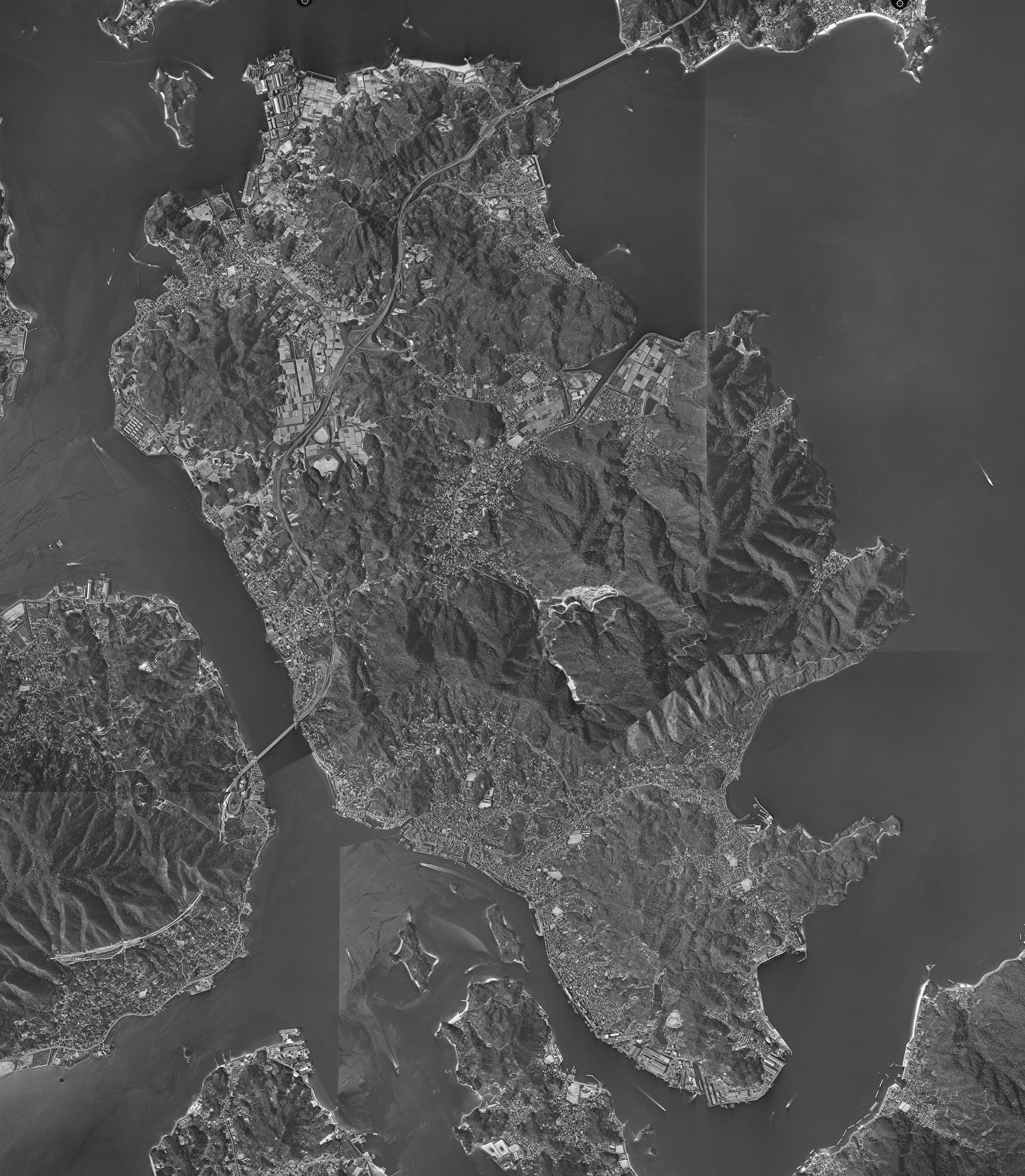
- Aerial image of the island

- Location within Japan Location within Hiroshima Prefecture

Geography
- Location: Seto Inland Sea
- Coordinates: 34°19′0″N 133°10′30″E
- Area: 35.03 km^{2} (13.53 sq mi)

Administration
- Japan
- Prefecture: Hiroshima Prefecture
- city: Onomichi

Demographics
- Population: 27,465 (2003)
- Ethnic groups: Japanese

Innoshima (因島) is an island in Onomichi, Hiroshima Prefecture, Japan. Originally, there was a city of the same name on this island, but it was merged into Onomichi in 2016.

== Geography ==
The island is located in the northeastern part of the Geiyo Islands and is about 17 km south of Onomichi.

== Transport ==
It is connected to Mukaishima Island by the Innoshima Bridge and also to Ikuchijima by the Ikuchi Bridge.

== Tourist attractions ==
- Innoshima Suigun Castle
- Ohamasaki Lighthouse
- Innoshima Pension Shirataki Sanso
