= Geiyo Islands =

Group of islands in the Seto inland sea

Native name: 芸予諸島
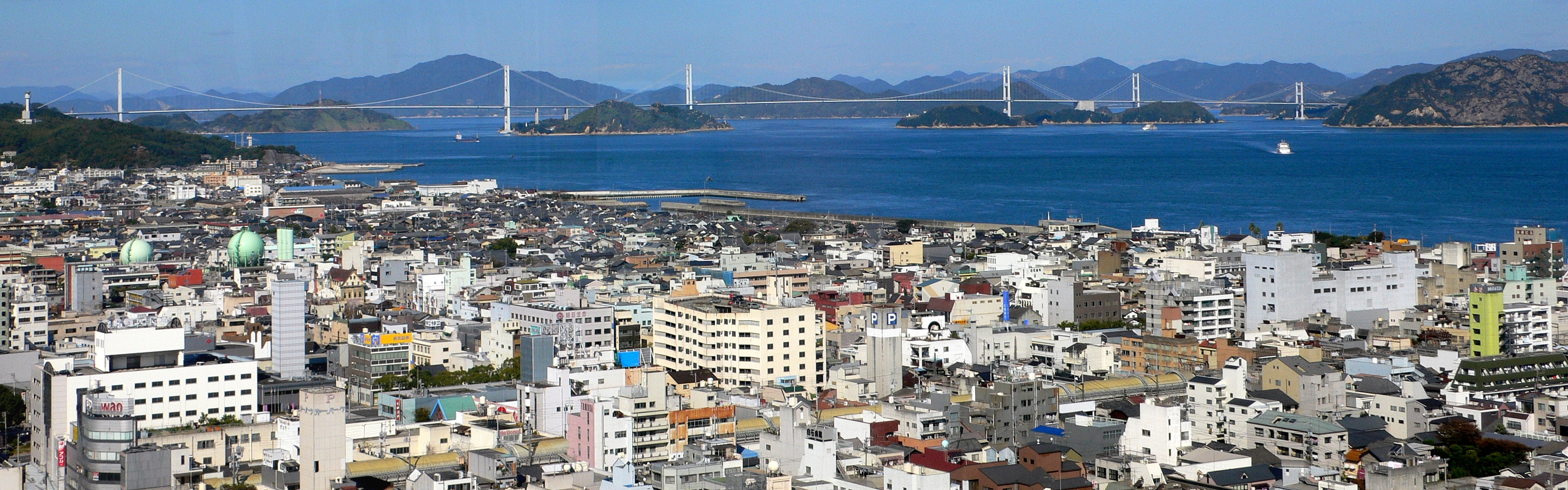
- View of Geiyo Islands and Shimanami Kaidō from Imabari, Ehime

- Location within Japan Location within Hiroshima Prefecture

Geography
- Location: Seto Inland Sea
- Coordinates: 34.283967°N 133.084169°E
- Major islands: 43
- Length: 98 km (60.9 mi)
- Width: 38 km (23.6 mi)

Administration
- Japan
- Prefecture: Hiroshima and Ehime

Demographics
- Ethnic groups: Japanese

The Geiyo Islands (芸予諸島, Geiyo Shotō) are a group of islands in the Seto Inland Sea, under the administration of Hiroshima Prefecture and Ehime Prefecture. Some of the largest islands in the archipelago are connected by the Nishiseto Expressway bridge system connecting Honshu and Shikoku, as well as the Akinada Tobishima Kaido from Kure, Hiroshima.

The Geiyo Archipelago is roughly defined as lying in the western part of Seto Inland Sea, from Hiuchi-nada to Aki-nada. A narrower definition of the archipelago only includes the islands between the former provinces of Iyo and Bizen. The islands in Hiroshima Bay, most notably Etajima and Kurahashi-jima, are therefore excluded from the latter definition.

== Economy and industry ==
Due to the calm yet deep waters of the Seto Inland Sea, the Geiyo Islands are one of the main hubs of shipbuilding, fishing, and aquaculture in Japan.

== List of islands ==
The largest islands in the group, each with an area of more than 20 km^{2}, are:

- Hakata
- Ikuchi-jima
- Innoshima
- Mukaishima
- Ōmishima
- Ōsakikamijima
- Ōshima

Other notable islands in the group include:

- Hyōtanjima
- Nii Ōshima
- Okamura
- Ōkunoshima
- Ōsakishimojima

The following islands may sometimes be included under the archipelago's broader definition:

- Etajima
- Itsukushima (Miyajima)
- Kurahashi-jima
- Ninoshima

== Gallery ==
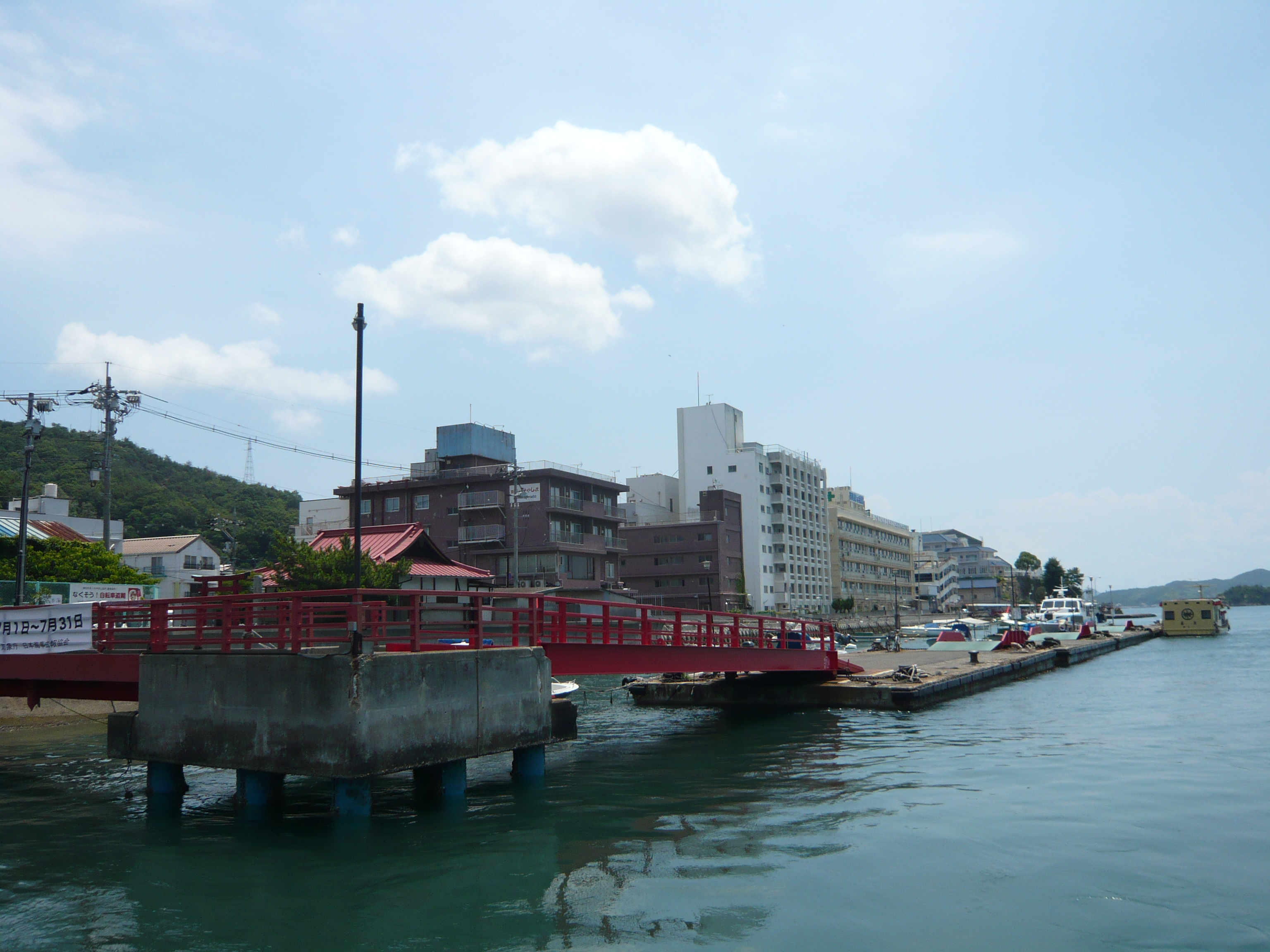
The urban area of Innoshima

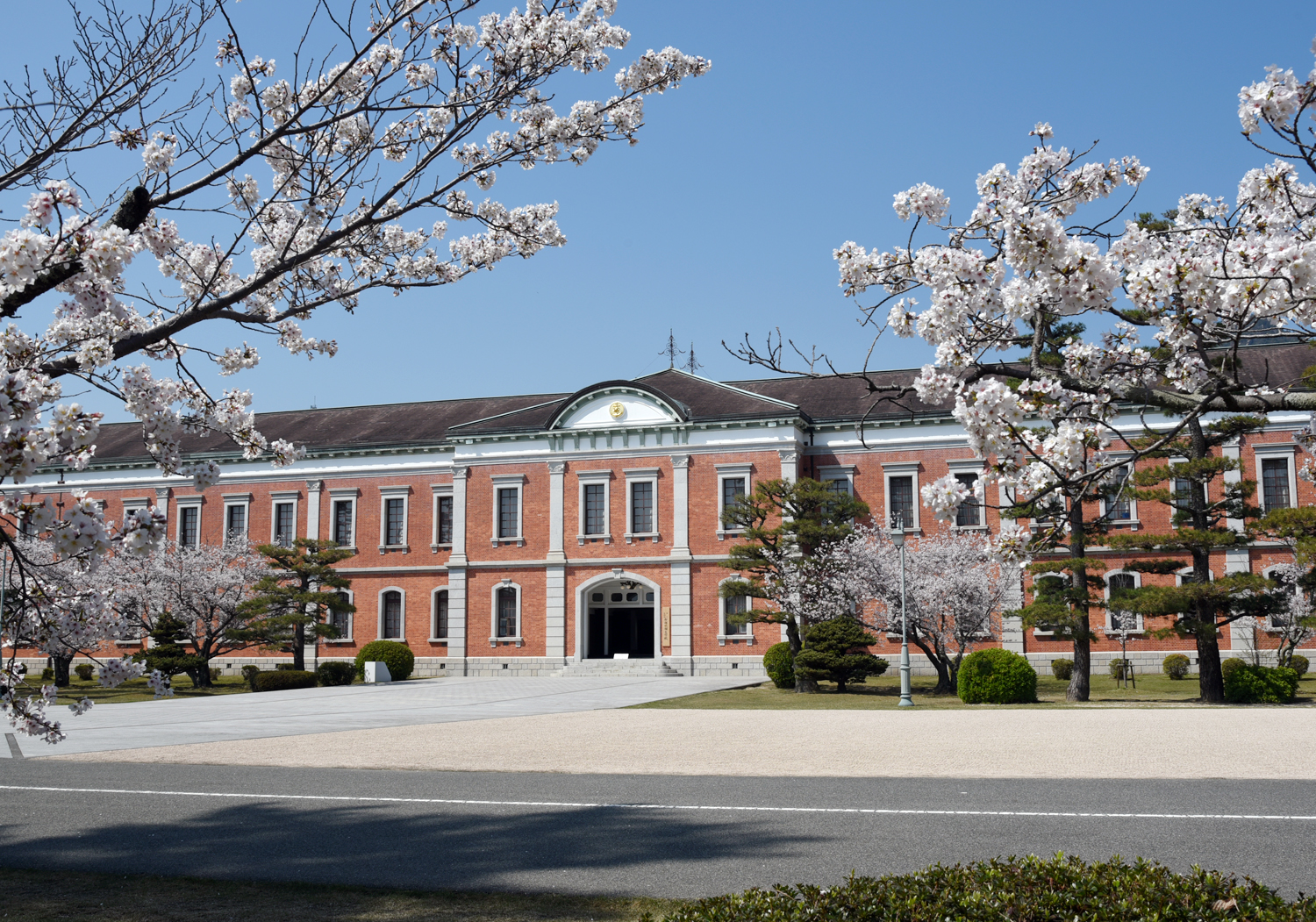
JMSDF Officer Candidate School in Etajima (the former Imperial Japanese Naval Academy)

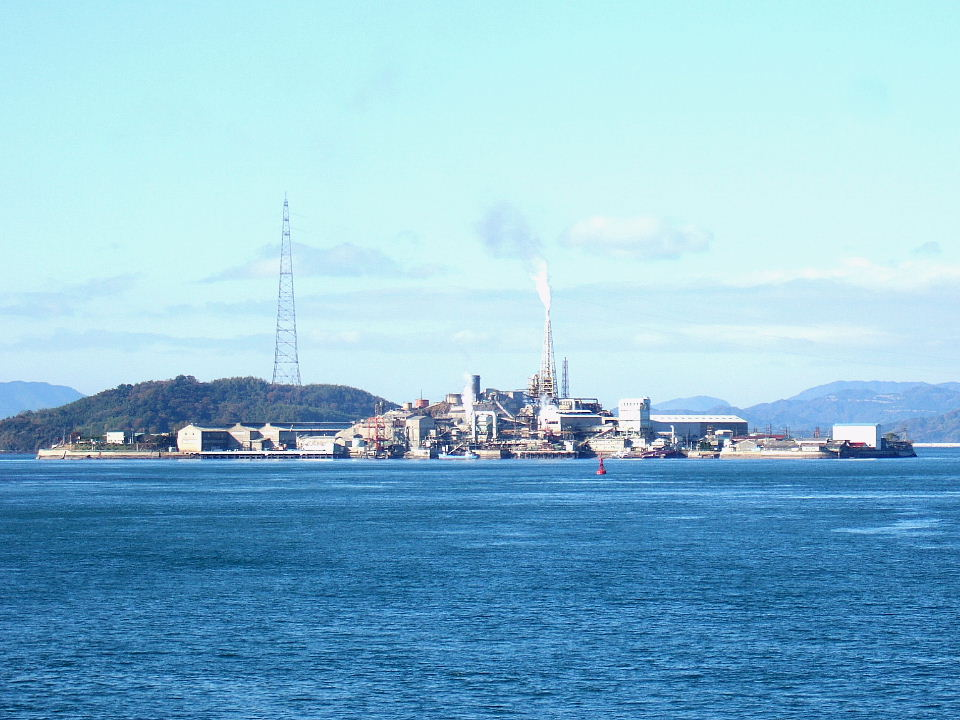
Chigiri-shima

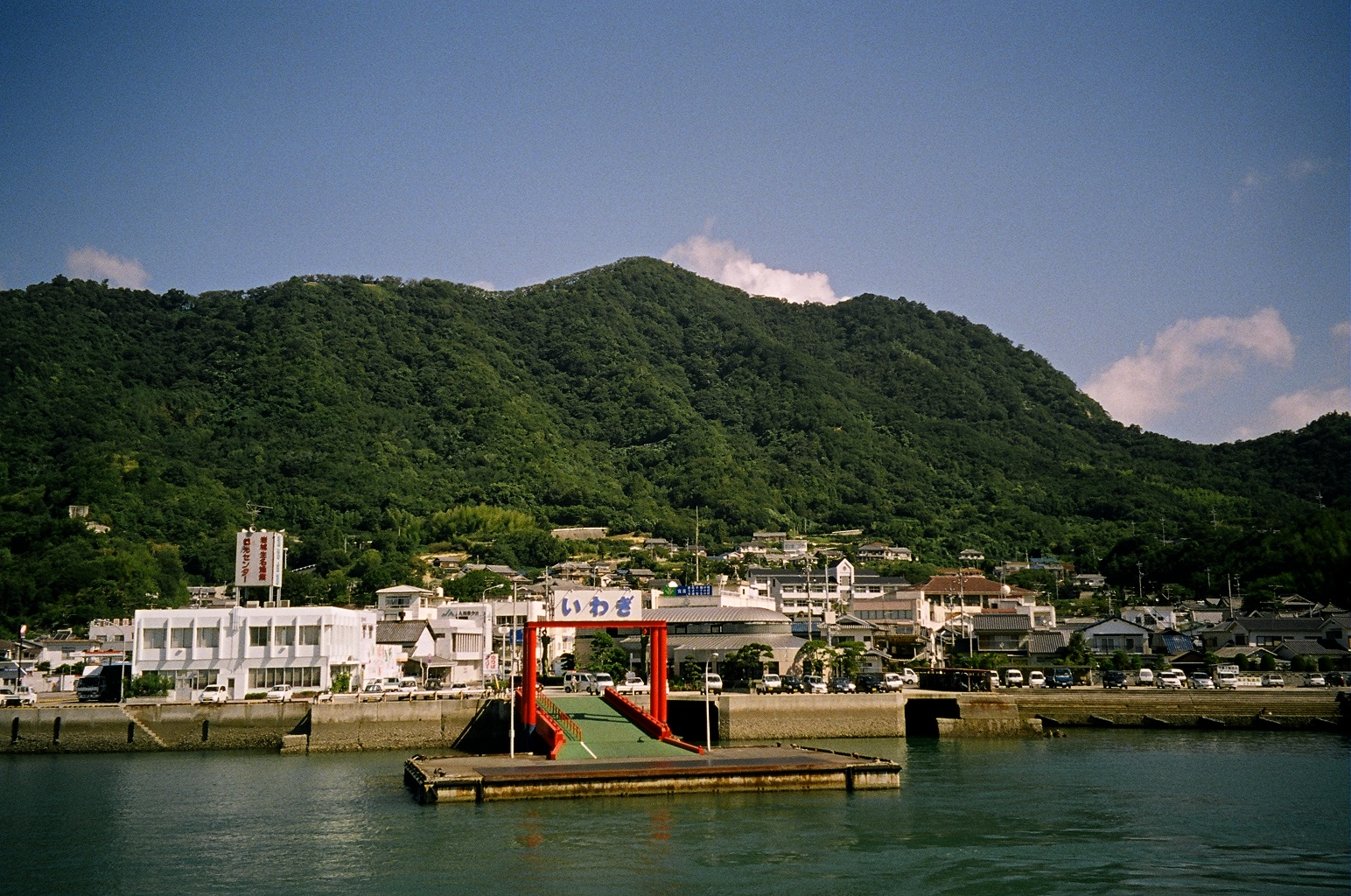
The fishing port in Iwagi-jima
