= Penta-Ocean =

Japanese construction firm

Penta-Ocean Construction Co., Ltd.

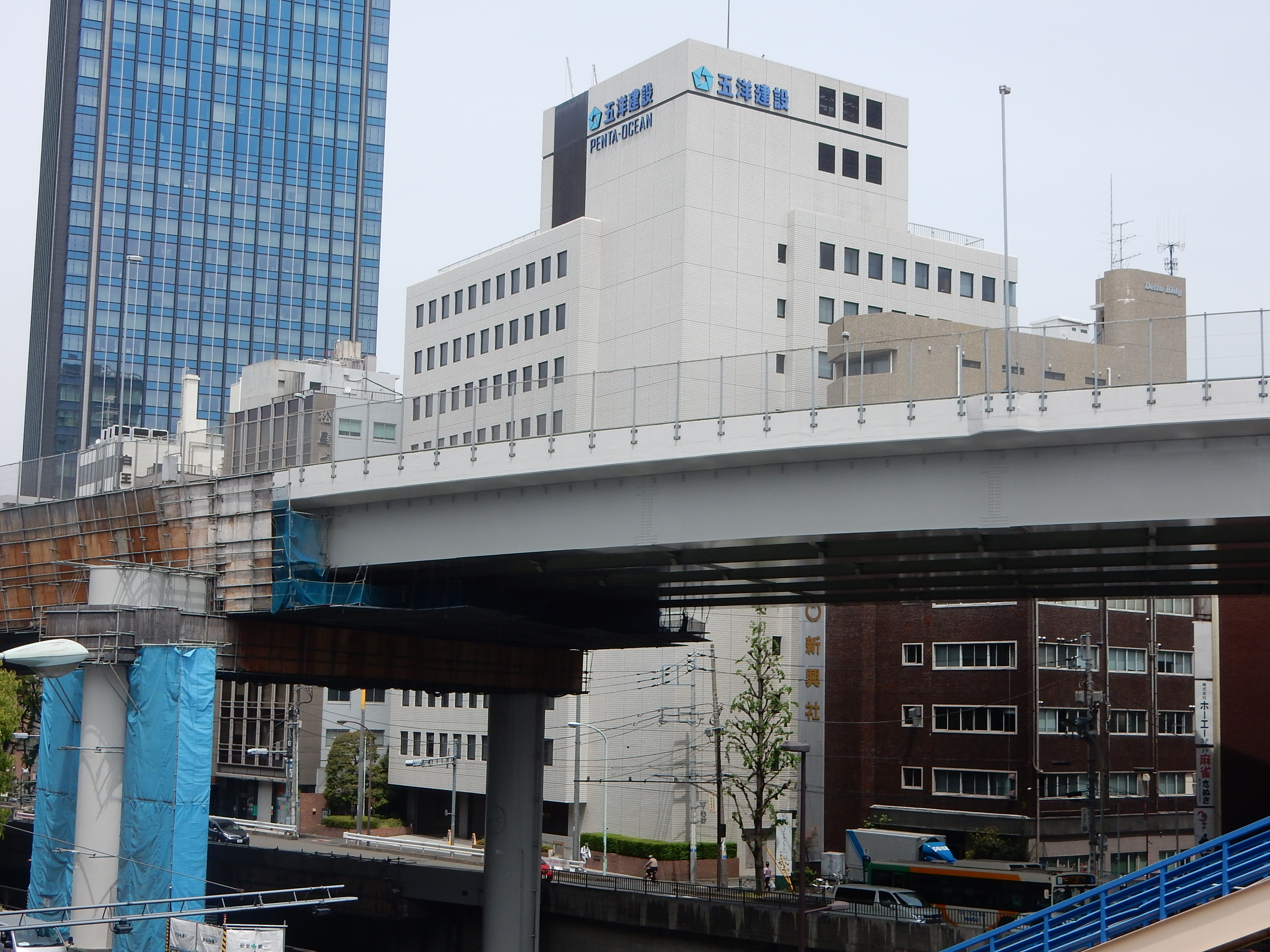
- Penta-Ocean Construction's headquarters in Tokyo, Japan
- Company type: Public KK
- Traded as: TYO: 1893; NAG: 1893
- Industry: Construction
- Founded: Kure, Hiroshima Prefecture, Japan (April 1896; 130 years ago)
- Headquarters: 2-8 Koraku 2-chome, Bunkyo-ku, Tokyo 112-8576, Japan
- Key people: Takuzo Shimizu, (President, Chief Executive Officer & Representative Director])
- Services: Construction; Engineering; Equipment leasing; Shipbuilding
- Revenue: ▲$ 3.69 billion USD (FY 2013) (¥ 381.18 billion JPY) (FY 2013)
- Net income: ▲$ 36.4 million USD (FY 2013) (¥ 3.76 billion JPY) (FY 2013)
- Number of employees: 2,911 (as of 31 March 2013)
- Subsidiaries: 26
- Website: Official website

Penta-Ocean Construction Co., Ltd. (五洋建設株式会社, Goyō Kensetsu Kabushiki-gaisha) is a major Japanese construction firm. It specializes in marine works and land reclamation.

It originated from Mizuno Gumi (水野組) in 1896 in Hiroshima Prefecture, and later renamed to the current name and capitalized in 1954. It has offices in Tokyo, Singapore, Hong Kong, Indonesia, Malaysia, Egypt, Sri Lanka, India, Thailand, Vietnam and Dubai.

The company is listed on the Tokyo and Nagoya Stock Exchange.

== Business segments and major projects ==
PentaOcean Construction is involved in numerous projects in Japan and overseas. The construction division is engaged in the development of railroads, sewerage systems, airports, harbors, roads, bridges, office and residential buildings, warehouses, plants and electric power stations.

The real estate division is engaged in real estate development and leasing. Other operations include the sale of construction materials and machinery, leasing and shipbuilding.

It was a major contractor for the land reclamation of Jurong Island, Pasir Panjang Container Terminal, Marina Bay reclamation, Tuas, Singapore Changi Airport reclamation projects in Singapore, the Esplanade in Singapore, widening and deepening of Suez Canal, West Rail for the Kowloon-Canton Railway, Patimban Deep Sea Port in Indonesia and a major contractor in the construction of Chubu International Airport and Kansai International Airport.

Among other construction includes Akinada Bridge in Hiroshima, the Nukui Dam in Hiroshima Prefecture, Rainbow Bridge, Tokyo Bay Aqua-Line, runway D of Haneda Airport in Tokyo, Prince of Wales Hospital in Hong Kong, VivoCity and ArtScience Museum in Singapore and South Container Terminal of Port of Constanţa in Romania.
