= Hakata Island =

Small island in the Seto Inland Sea

Native name: 伯方島
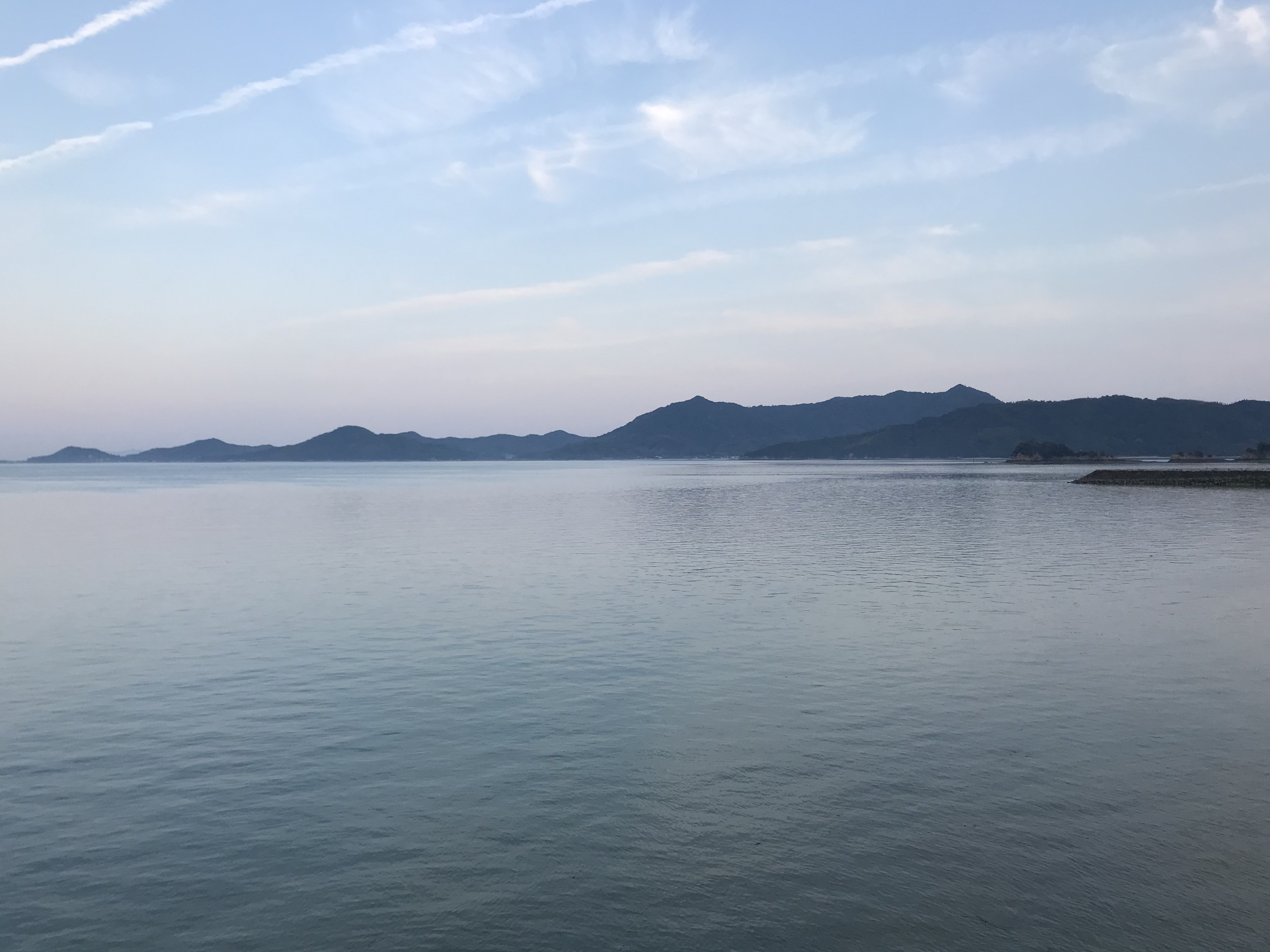
- Interactive map of Hakata Island

Geography
- Location: Geiyo Islands
- Coordinates: 34°13′0″N 133°5′21″E
- Area: 53.5 km^{2} (20.7 sq mi)

Administration
- Japan
- Prefecture: Ehime Prefecture
- City: Imabari

Demographics
- Ethnic groups: Japanese

Hakata Island (伯方島, Hakatajima) is an island in the Inland Sea of Japan. Administratively, it is part of the city of Imabari, Ehime Prefecture. Originally, there was a town of the same name on this island, but it was merged into Imabari in 2005.

There are four shipyards on the island, and many shipowners reside there as well. The island is home to the headquarters of the salt production company Hakata Salt, and the salt it sells is also famous.

== Gallery ==
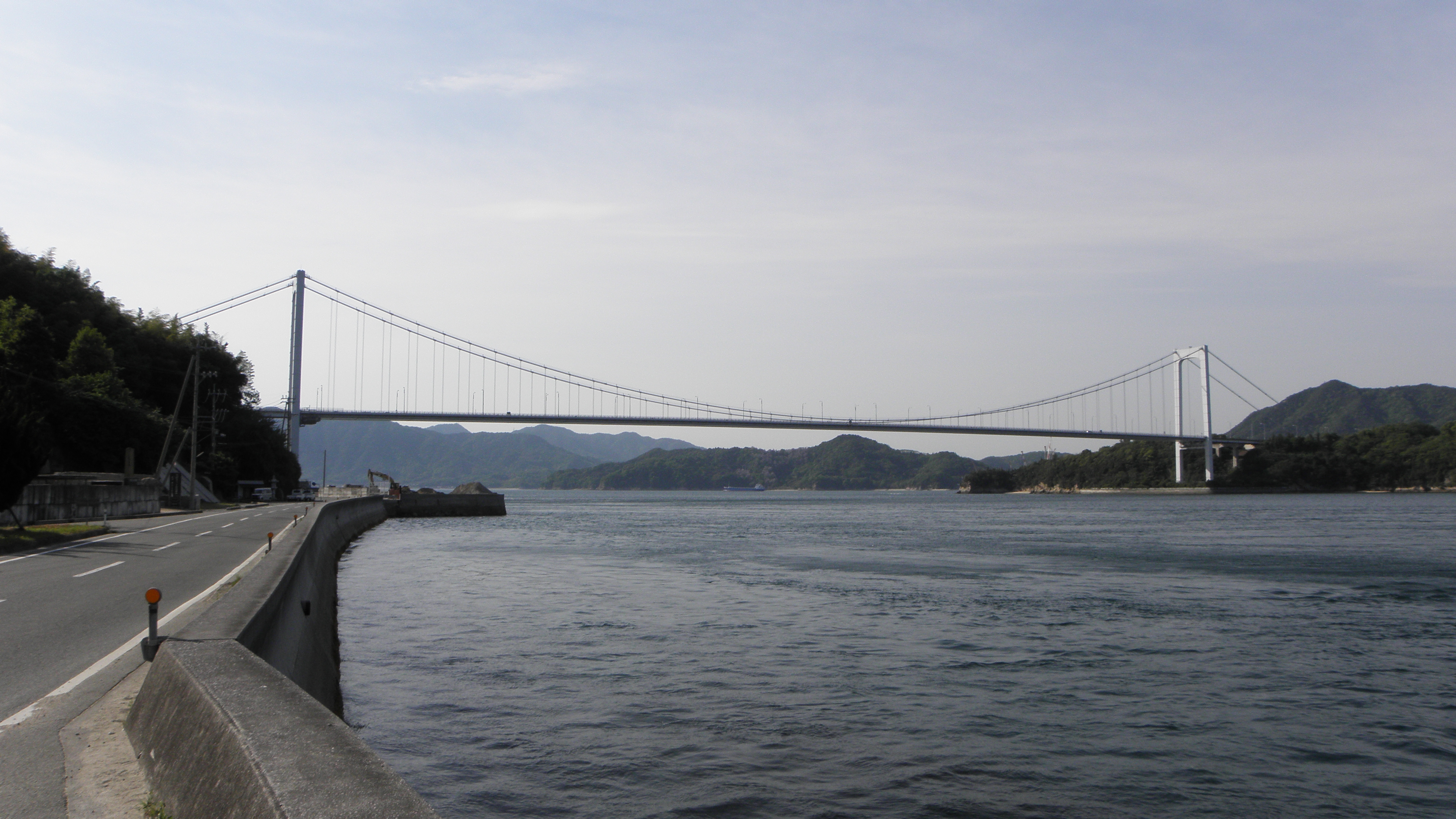
Hakata–Ōshima Bridge

Michinoeki Hakata S.C Park
