= Akinada Bridge =

Akinada Bridge 安芸灘大橋
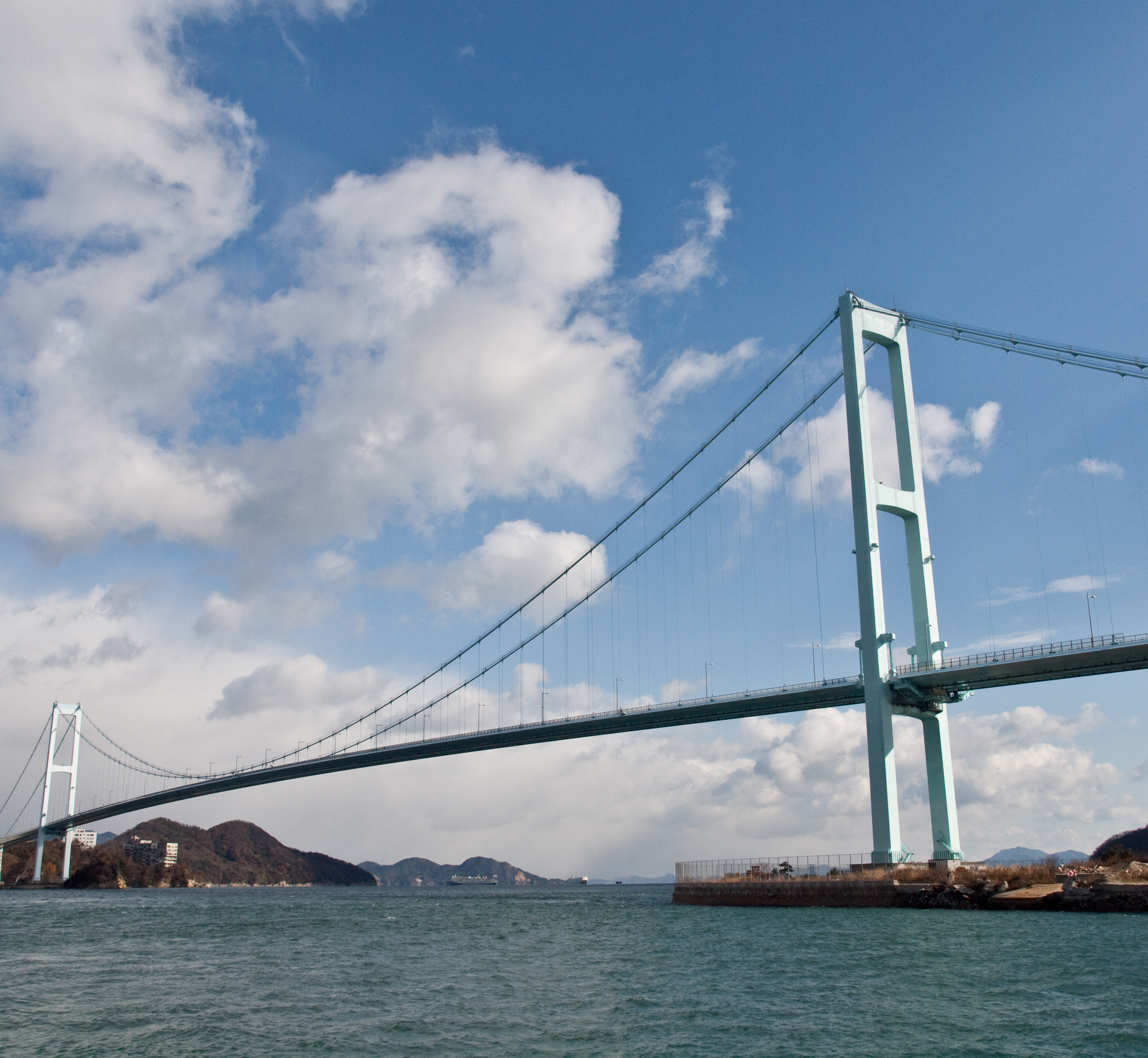
- Coordinates: 34°12′22″N 132°40′46″E
- Carries: Motor vehicles, pedestrians and bicycles
- Crosses: Seto Inland Sea
- Locale: Kure, Hiroshima, Japan
- Maintained by: Hiroshima Prefecture Road Corporation

Characteristics
- Design: Suspension bridge
- Total length: 1,175 m (3,855 ft)
- Width: 12.7 m (42 ft)
- Height: 119.45 m (392 ft)
- Longest span: 750 m (2,461 ft)
- Clearance below: 40 m (131 ft) at mid-span

History
- Construction end: 1999; 27 years ago
- Opened: 18 January 2000; 26 years ago

Location
- Interactive map of Akinada Bridge

The Akinada Bridge (安芸灘大橋, Akinada Ō-hashi) is a suspension bridge in Kure, Hiroshima, Japan that crosses the Seto Inland Sea. Completed in 1999, it has a main span of 750 m (2,460 ft). The first and largest bridge on the Akinada Tobishima Kaido, it was constructed by Penta-Ocean Construction, at a cost of 50 billion yen.

== Overview ==
The bridge was opened to traffic on 18 January 2000. The bridge is part of Hiroshima Prefecture Route 74, a route that begins in Honshu and crosses over the Seto Inland Sea via the Akinada Bridge to Shimo-kamagari Island to the south. The bridge is tolled and operated by the Hiroshima Prefecture Road Corporation. It is the longest bridge in Japan to be maintained by a prefecture. The average daily traffic volume on the bridge was 4,000 vehicles by May 2000, far exceeding the expected volume of 2,400 vehicles using it every day.
