= Ōmishima Island =

Island in Ehime, Japan

Native name: 大三島 Ōmishima
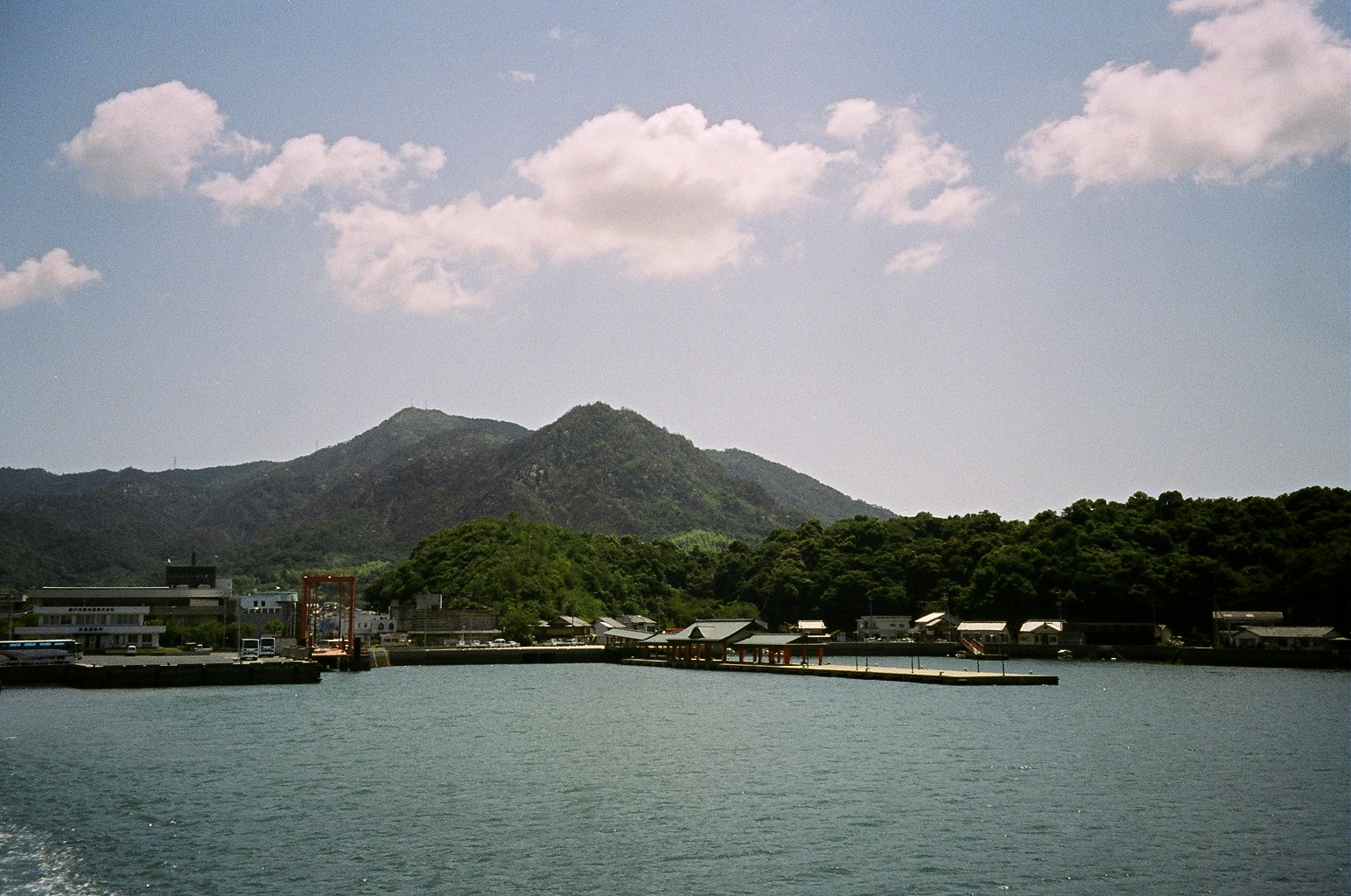
- Miyaura port

- Location within Japan

Geography
- Location: Seto Inland Sea
- Coordinates: 34°14′42″N 133°0′36″E
- Archipelago: Geiyo Islands
- Area: 64.54 km^{2} (24.92 sq mi)
- Length: 12.8 km (7.95 mi)
- Width: 6.2 km (3.85 mi)
- Coastline: 88.8 km (55.18 mi)
- Highest elevation: 437 m (1434 ft)
- Highest point: Washigatozan

Administration
- Japan
- Prefecture: Ehime
- City: Imabari

Demographics
- Population: 4963 (2020)
- Pop. density: 77/km^{2} (199/sq mi)
- Ethnic groups: Japanese

Ōmishima Island (大三島, Ōmishima) is the largest island in the Geiyo Islands chain, and the westernmost island on which Japan's Nishiseto Expressway, which links Honshu and Shikoku via a number of islands, runs. It is located in the Seto Inland Sea. The island's highest peak is Washigatozan (鷲ヶ頭山) at an altitude of 437 m (1,434 ft).

== Population ==
The population as of the 2020 census was 4,963 - 2,299 men, and 2,264 women.

== Geography ==
Ōmishima is kidney-shaped and together with Ōsakikamijima on the west encloses the calm bay of Utena, where the primary seaport of Miyaura is located. The island's Utena Dam reservoir is the primary freshwater source for Ōmishima itself and the nearby Hakata.

== Nature ==
Originally, the island had many bald mountains and little vegetation. Most of the forests that exist today have been artificially planted since the Meiji period. It is believed that in prehistoric times, the vegetation was dominated by ubame oak (Quercus phillyraeoides), tobira (Pittosporum tobira), and camphor trees (Camphora officinarum). Even today, old camphor and ubame oak trees remain at the shrine, and the "Camphor trees of Oyamazumi Shrine" in particular are a group of camphor trees in a primeval forest grove and have been designated a national natural monument.

== History ==
- 1541 - Tsuruhime fights Ōuchi Yoshitaka fleet
- 1874 - post office established
- 1979 - Ōmishima bridge connecting to Ehime Prefecture complete
- 1999 - Tatara Bridge connecting to Hiroshima Prefecture complete
- 16 January 2005 - several towns (including Ōmishima, Ehime) and villages on the island were merged into the city of Imabari, Ehime, along with towns and villages on other surrounding islands.

== Climate ==
Climate data for Ōmishima (1991−2020 normals, extremes 1978−present)
Month	Jan	Feb	Mar	Apr	May	Jun	Jul	Aug	Sep	Oct	Nov	Dec	Year
Record high °C (°F)	16.0 (60.8)	20.2 (68.4)	25.4 (77.7)	27.9 (82.2)	30.4 (86.7)	33.7 (92.7)	38.0 (100.4)	37.4 (99.3)	36.1 (97.0)	31.9 (89.4)	24.1 (75.4)	20.4 (68.7)	38.0 (100.4)
Mean daily maximum °C (°F)	9.6 (49.3)	10.2 (50.4)	13.4 (56.1)	18.6 (65.5)	23.2 (73.8)	26.1 (79.0)	30.0 (86.0)	32.0 (89.6)	28.3 (82.9)	22.8 (73.0)	17.2 (63.0)	12.0 (53.6)	20.3 (68.5)
Daily mean °C (°F)	5.5 (41.9)	5.6 (42.1)	8.4 (47.1)	13.1 (55.6)	17.6 (63.7)	21.3 (70.3)	25.3 (77.5)	26.8 (80.2)	23.4 (74.1)	18.0 (64.4)	12.5 (54.5)	7.7 (45.9)	15.4 (59.8)
Mean daily minimum °C (°F)	1.3 (34.3)	1.1 (34.0)	3.4 (38.1)	8.0 (46.4)	12.7 (54.9)	17.6 (63.7)	22.0 (71.6)	23.2 (73.8)	19.7 (67.5)	13.8 (56.8)	8.2 (46.8)	3.4 (38.1)	11.2 (52.2)
Record low °C (°F)	−5.9 (21.4)	−6.2 (20.8)	−4.4 (24.1)	−1.5 (29.3)	3.6 (38.5)	9.6 (49.3)	15.5 (59.9)	15.6 (60.1)	11.1 (52.0)	5.5 (41.9)	−1.3 (29.7)	−3.5 (25.7)	−6.2 (20.8)
Average precipitation mm (inches)	40.8 (1.61)	54.0 (2.13)	89.5 (3.52)	98.0 (3.86)	116.2 (4.57)	186.3 (7.33)	194.6 (7.66)	93.5 (3.68)	133.4 (5.25)	96.3 (3.79)	66.0 (2.60)	50.1 (1.97)	1,218.6 (47.98)
Average precipitation days (≥ 1.0 mm)	5.3	6.7	9.0	8.9	8.7	11.1	9.4	6.7	8.8	7.3	6.4	6.0	94.3
Mean monthly sunshine hours	146.1	151.2	182.0	200.2	214.7	157.1	201.2	233.9	171.2	180.4	159.2	144.3	2,141.6
Source: JMA

== Transportation ==
Ōmishima is connected to the mainland of Honshu and Shikoku islands by the bridges of the Nishiseto Expressway (Shimanami Kaidō). A ferry is also available from the island to Ōsakikamijima, Okamura Island and Ōkunoshima (Rabbit Island). Ōmishima Island is served by the national Route 317.

== Attractions ==
- The salt factory
- Historical and marine museum
- Ōyamazumi Shrine
- Toyo Ito Museum of Architecture, Imabari
- The entire Ōmishima Island is designated as a National Place of Scenic Beauty

== Notable residents ==
- Shozo Fujita - historian
- Tsuruhime - priestess and warlord

== See also ==
- Hyōtanjima
