= Utena Dam =

Dam in Ehime Prefecture, Japan

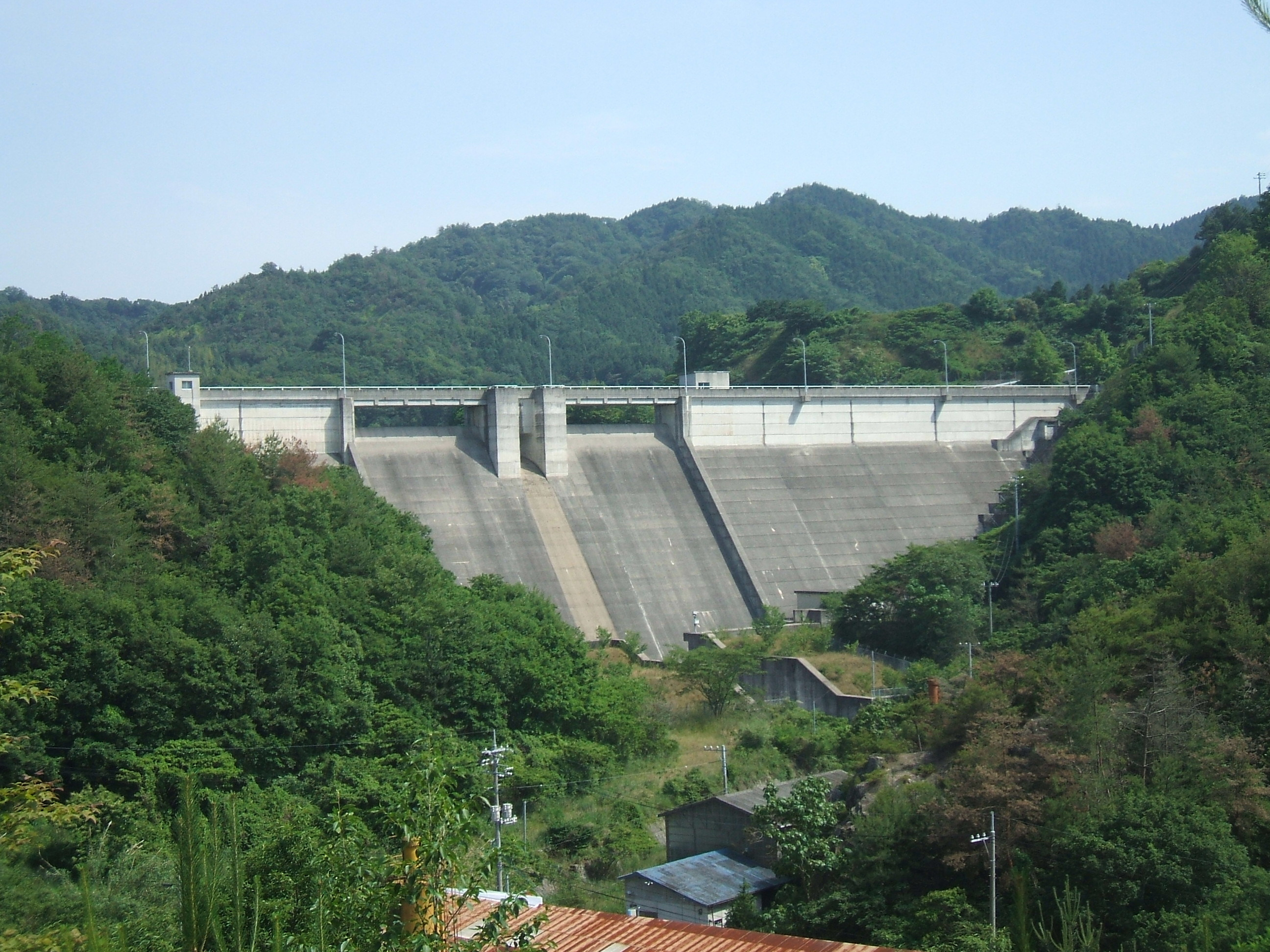

- Location within Japan
- Location: Ehime Prefecture, Japan
- Coordinates: 34°13′45″N 133°0′46″E
- Construction began: 1982
- Opening date: 1991

Dam and spillways
- Height: 42.3 m (139 ft)
- Length: 225 m (738 ft)

Reservoir
- Total capacity: 1,790,000 m^{3} (63,000,000 cu ft)
- Catchment area: 4.9 km^{2} (1.9 sq mi)
- Surface area: 16 hectares (40 acres)

Utena Dam is a gravity dam located in Ehime Prefecture on the island of Shikoku, the smallest of the four main islands in Japan. The dam is used for flood control and water supply. The catchment area of the dam is 4.9 km^{2}. The dam impounds about 16 ha of land when full and can store 1790 thousand cubic meters of water. The construction of the dam was started in 1982 and completed in 1991.
