= Setoda, Hiroshima =

Setoda 瀬戸田町
- Town
- Flag Emblem
- Interactive map of Setoda
- Country: Japan
- Prefecture: Hiroshima
- District: Toyota
- Merged: January 10, 2006 (now part of Onomichi)

Area
  - Total: 32.76 km^{2} (12.65 sq mi)

Population (2003)
  - Total: 9,310
  - Density: 284.19/km^{2} (736.0/sq mi)
- Time zone: UTC+09:00 (JST)

Setoda (瀬戸田町, Setoda-chō) was a town located in Toyota District, Hiroshima Prefecture, Japan.

== Population ==
As of 2003, the town had an estimated population of 9,310 and a density of 284.19 persons per km^{2}. The total area was 32.76 km^{2}.

== History ==
On January 10, 2006, Setoda, along with the city of Innoshima, was merged into the expanded city of Onomichi.

== Geography ==
Setoda is located on the island of Ikuchijima.
