= Ōsakikamijima Island =

Small island in the Seto Inland Sea

Native name: 大崎上島
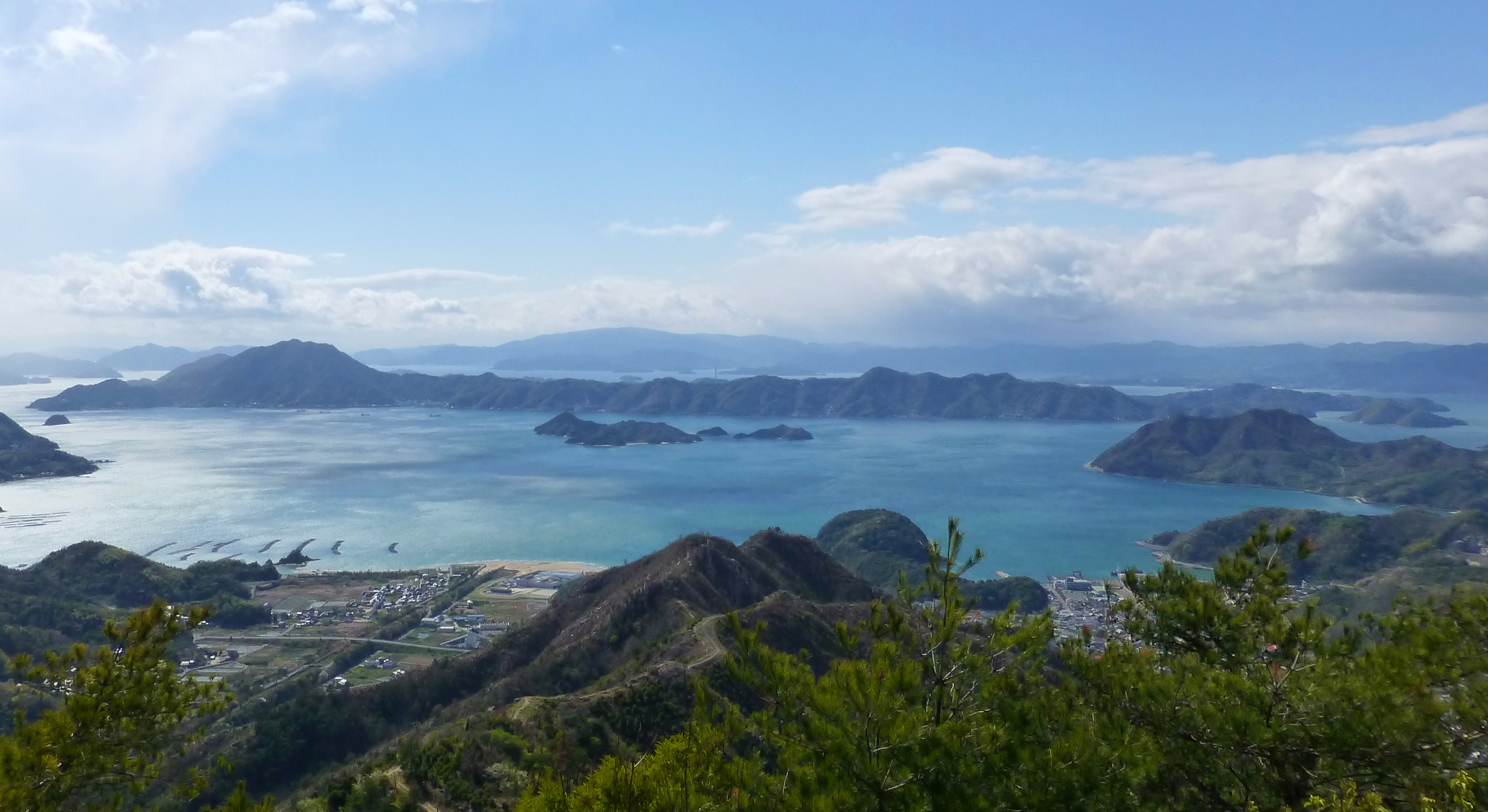
- Interactive map of Ōsakikamijima Island

Geography
- Location: Geiyo Islands
- Coordinates: 34°14′43″N 132°53′41″E
- Area: 38.27 km^{2} (14.78 sq mi)

Administration
- Japan
- Prefecture: Hiroshima Prefecture
- Town: Ōsakikamijima

Demographics
- Population: 7,158
- Ethnic groups: Japanese

Ōsakikamijima Island (大崎上島, Ōsakikamijima) is an island in the Inland Sea of Japan which is administratively part of the town of Ōsakikamijima, Hiroshima Prefecture. As of 2020, the population was about 7,158.

== Transportation ==
This island is accessible by ferry from Takehara, Hiroshima, and Imabari.

== Gallery ==
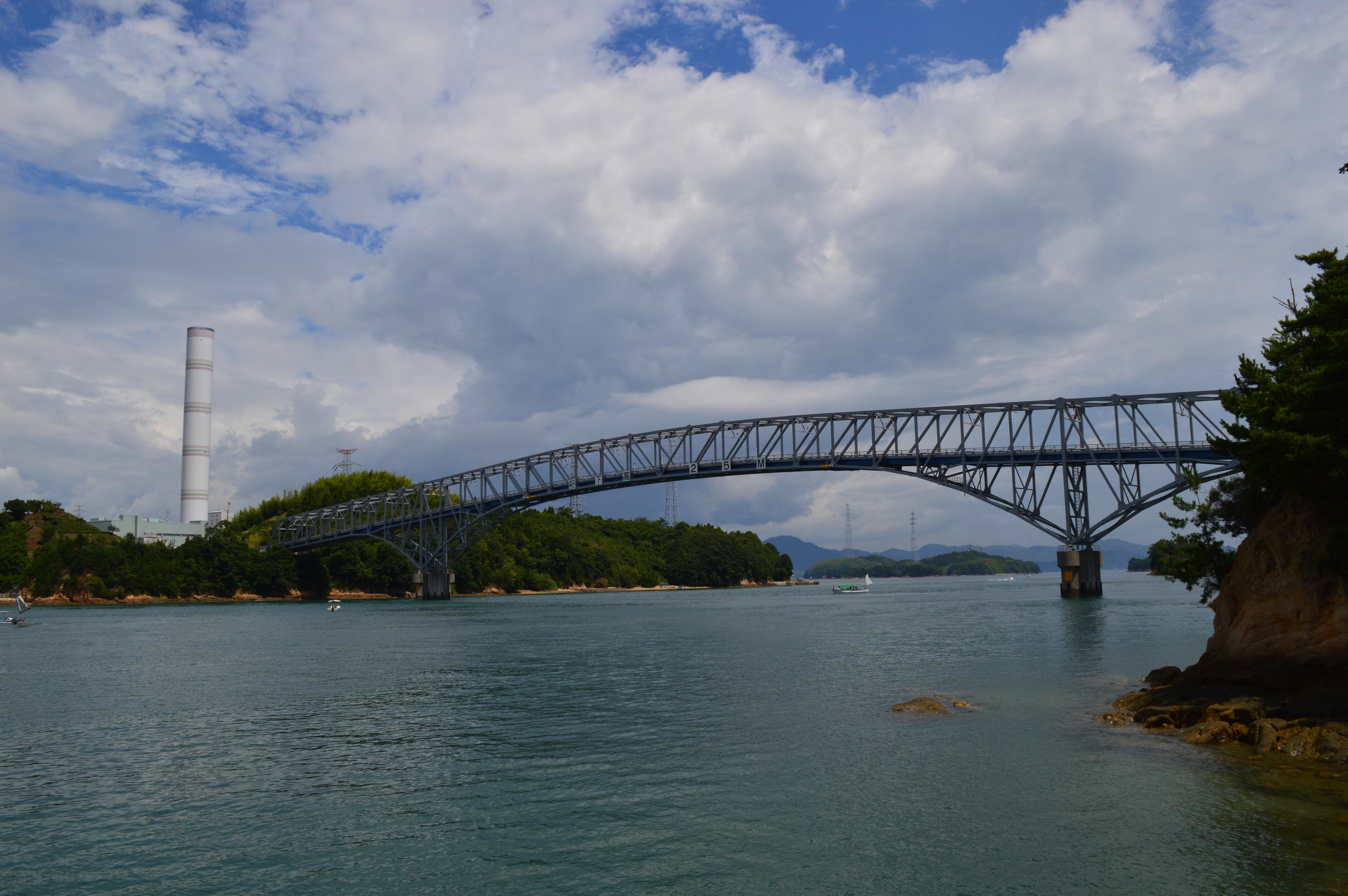
Nagashima Bridge

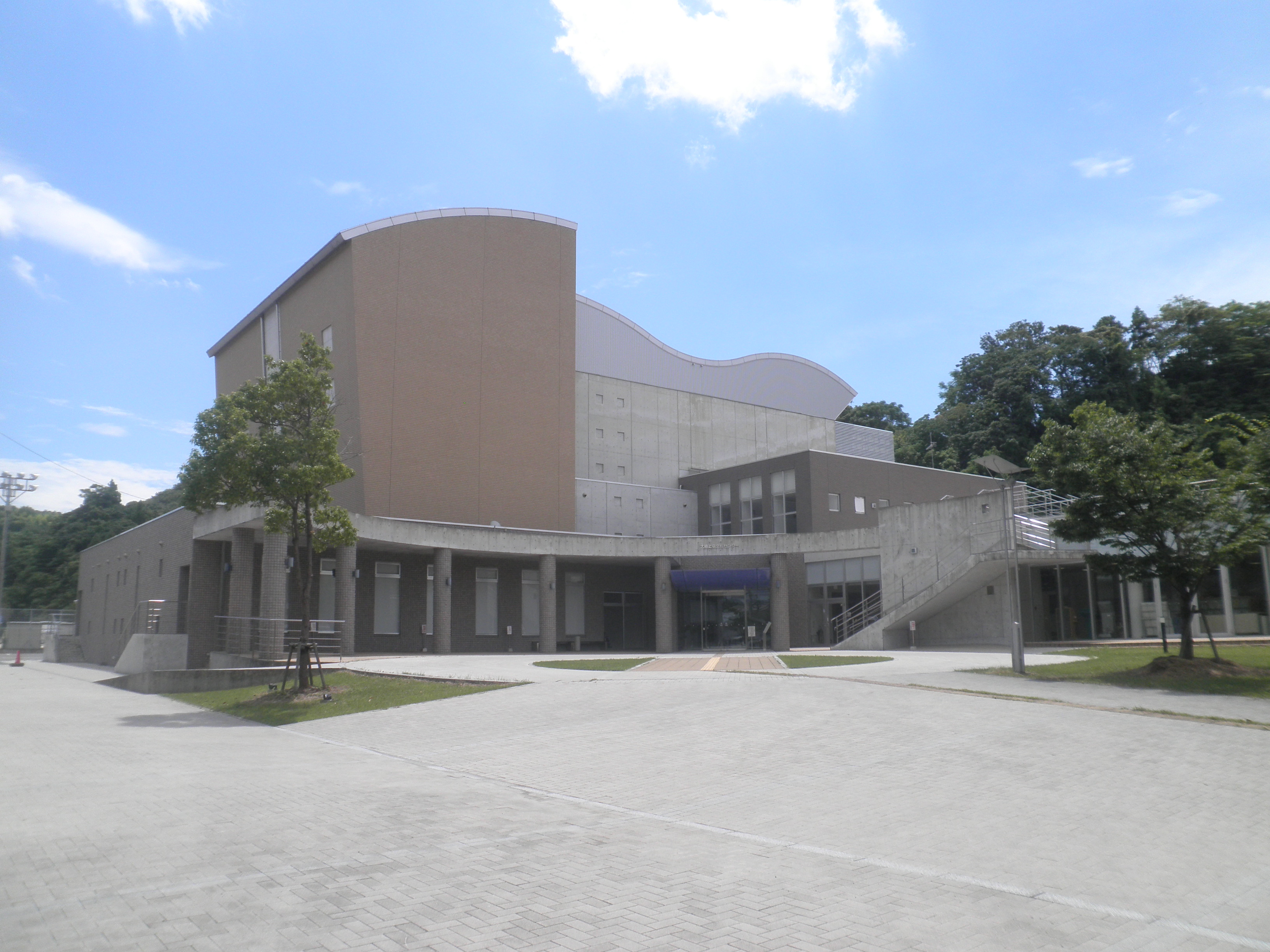
Ōsakikamijima Cultural Center

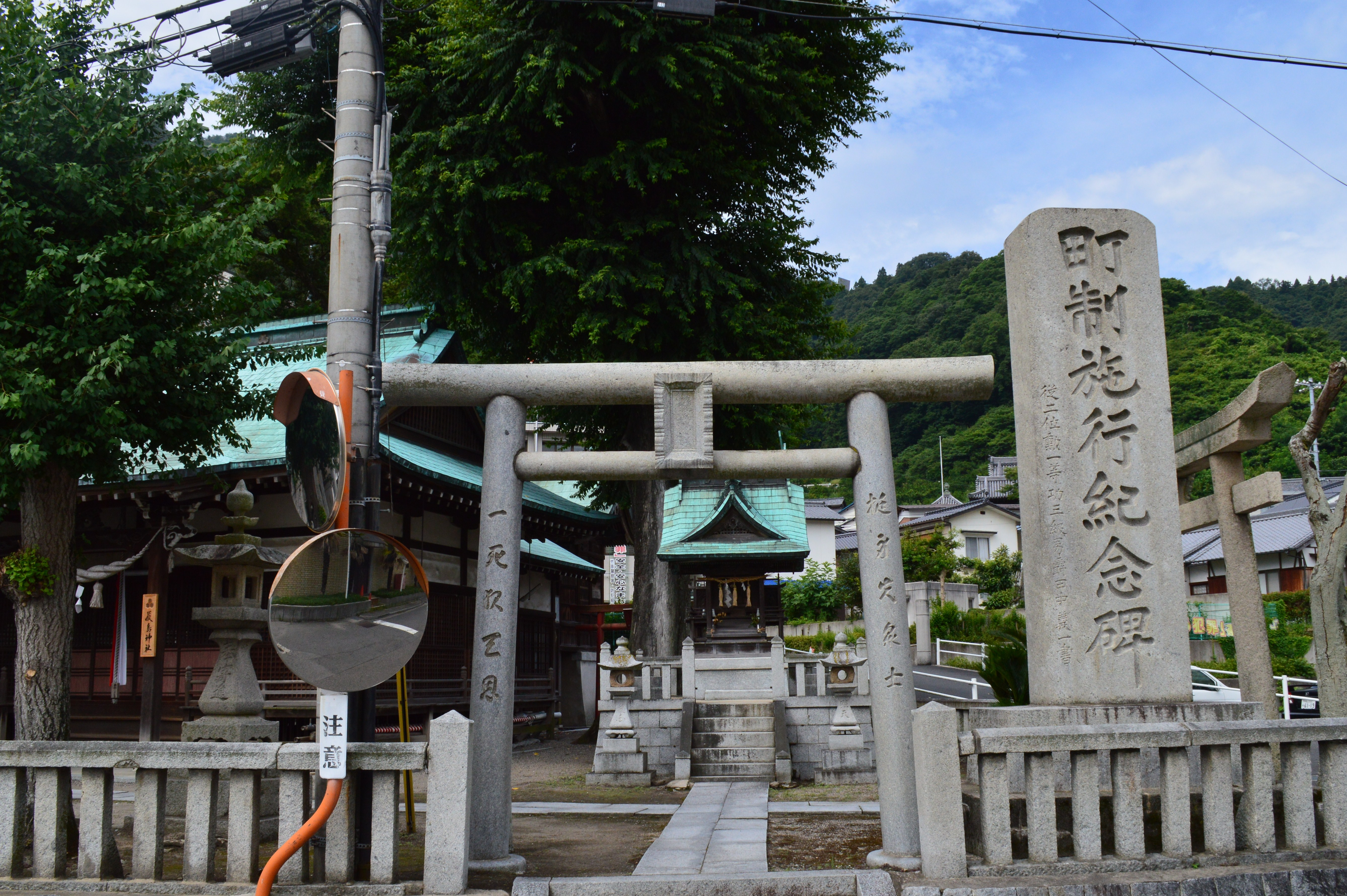
Kinoe Itsukushima Shrine
