= Shozo Fujita =

Historian and political scientist

Shozo Fujita (藤田 省三, Fujita Shōzō) (1927–2003) was a Japanese political scientist and intellectual historian, a "leading intellectual of 'postwar Japan'" and a follower of Masao Maruyama.
