= Okamura Island =

Small island in the Seto Inland Sea

Coordinates: 34°11′16″N 132°52′41″E

Native name: 岡村島
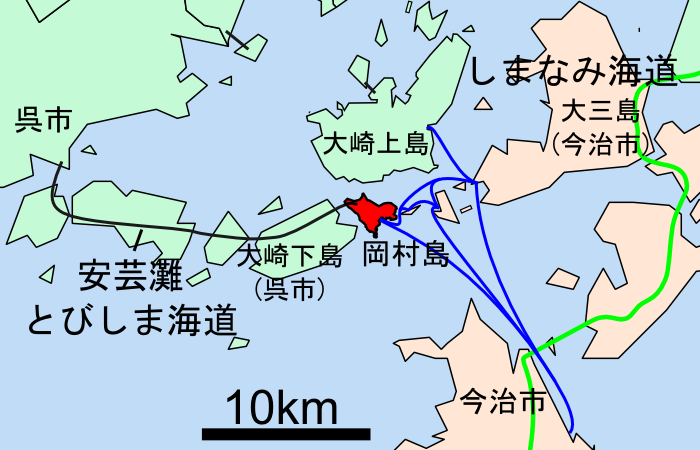
- Interactive map of Okamura Island

Geography
- Location: Sekizen islands (Seto Inland Sea)
- Total islands: 1
- Area: 3.10 km^{2} (1.20 sq mi)
- Coastline: 11.1 km (6.9 mi)

Administration
- Japan

Demographics
- Population: 409 (2012)
- Ethnic groups: Japanese

Additional information
- Official website: \

Okamura Island (岡村島, Okamura-jima) is a small island in the Inland Sea of Japan. Administratively, it is part of the city of Imabari, Ehime Prefecture. The island is famous for mikan and butterflies. As of 2006, the population was about 1,000. The area is 3.13 km^{2} and the circumference is 11.1 km. Access is from Imabari by fast or slow ferry boat, or by road from Kure.

== Transportation ==
The island can be accessed by ferry from Imabari or from Ōmishima Island, Ehime. It can also be accessed by road from the city of Kure, Hiroshima Prefecture through the Akinada Islands Connecting Bridges. The last of these bridges, the Okamura Great Bridge, is a 228 metre long arch bridge which connects Okamura Island with Nakano Island.

== Gallery ==
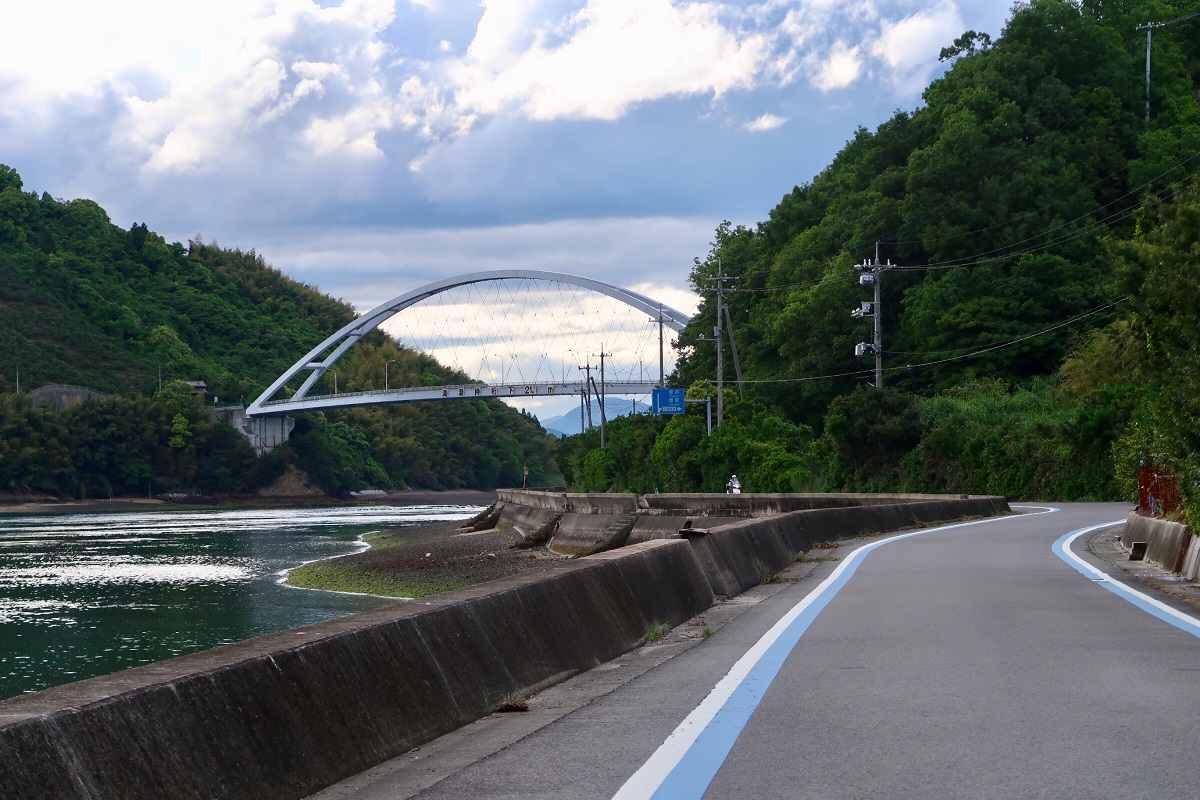
Okamura Great Bridge, May 2016

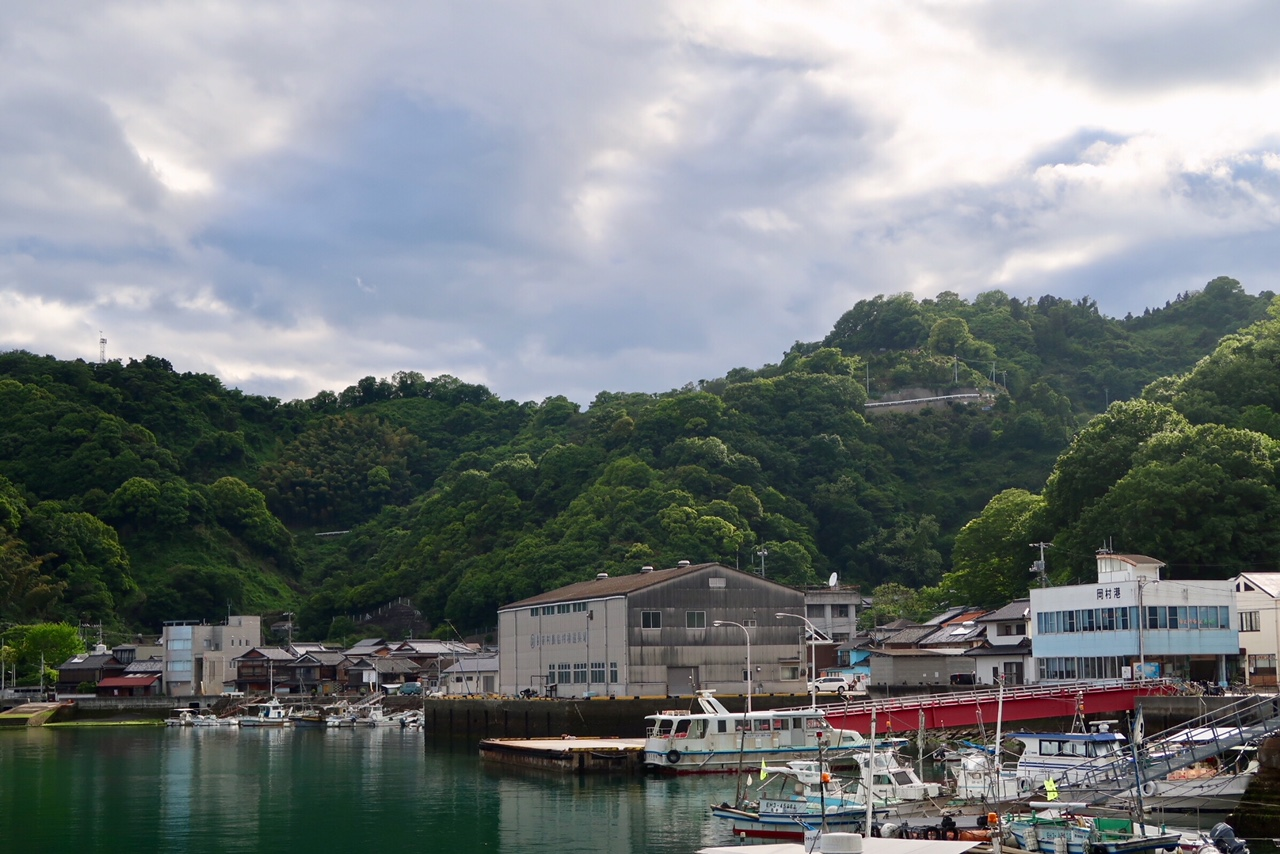
Okamura Island main harbour, May 2016
