= Innoshima, Hiroshima =

Innoshima 因島市
- City
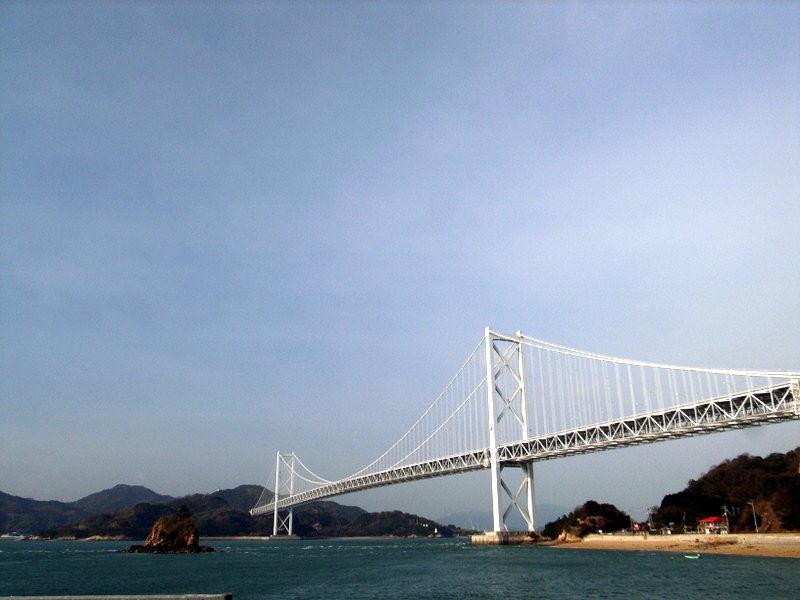
- The Innoshima Bridge connects Mukaishima with Innoshima in Hiroshima Prefecture in Japan

- Flag Emblem
- Interactive map of Innoshima
- Country: Japan
- Prefecture: Hiroshima
- Established: May 1, 1953

Area
  - Total: 39.76 km^{2} (15.35 sq mi)

Population (2003)
  - Total: 27,465
  - Density: 690.8/km^{2} (1,789/sq mi)

Innoshima (因島, Innoshima) was a city in Hiroshima Prefecture, Japan. The city was located within the Innoshima, Geiyo Islands of the Seto Inland Sea. The city was founded on May 1, 1953.

As of 2003, the city had an estimated population of 27,465 and a population density of 690.77 persons per km^{2}. The total area was 39.76 km^{2}.

On January 10, 2006, Innoshima, along with the town of Setoda (from Toyota District), was merged into the expanded city of Onomichi.

== History ==
During World War II, Innoshima island was the site of a prisoner-of-war camp, Hiroshima Camp No. 2.

== Tourist site ==
- Mount Shirataki
- Innoshima Park

== Transportation ==
- There is a ferry which comes/goes from/to Onomichi Station Onomichi, Hiroshima and Setoda, Hiroshima, Sagi, Hiroshima from/to Shigei-higashi Port on this island.
- There is a ferry which comes/goes from/to Mihara Station Mihara, Hiroshima from/to, Ikina, Hiroshima, from/to Shigei-nishi Port, Innoshima Mall and Habu Port on this island.
- There is a ferry which comes/goes from/to Imabari Station Imabari, Ehime from/to, Nagae, Hiroshima, from/to Habu Port on this island.
