= Murakami clan =

Japanese pirate and samurai clan

Murakami 村上
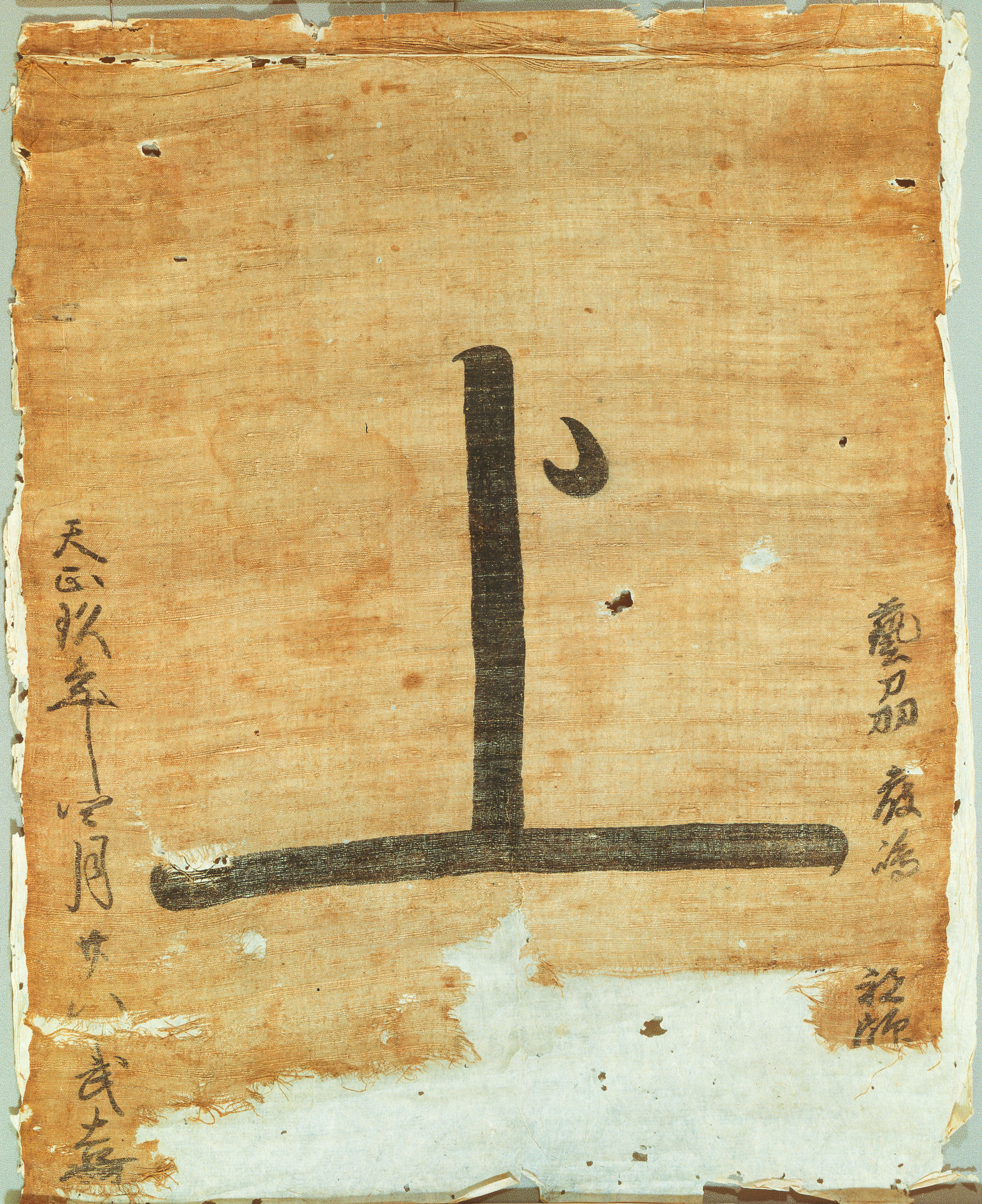
- Noshima Murakami clan's ship flag, (1581), property of Yamaguchi Prefectural Archives
- Home province: Murakami Domain, Echigo Province; Seto Inland Sea, Ehime prefecture
- Parent house: Minamoto clan
- Final ruler: Noshima branch: Murakami Kagehiro; Innoshima branch: Murakami Naosue; Kurushima branch: Kuroshima Nagachika
- Ruled until: 1600. absorbed by the Mōri clan after the battle of Sekigahara

The Murakami clan (村上氏, Murakami-shi) was a pirate and samurai clan active in the waters around the Geiyo Islands in Hiroshima Prefecture during medieval Japan period. It consisted of three sub clans based on the islands of the Geiyo Islands: the Innoshima Murakami clan (因島村上氏), the Kurushima Murakami clan (来島村上氏), and the Noshima Murakami clan (能島村上氏). These three clans were known collectively as the Mishima Murakami clan (三島村上氏; lit. "Murakami of the Three Islands").

They were known for their activity as pirates and a naval force, hence they were nicknamed the Murakami navy (村上水軍, Murakami suigun).

== Origin ==
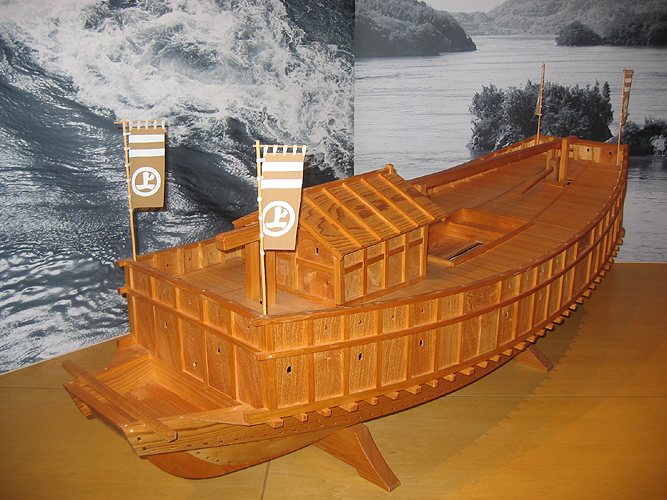
Murakami Navy's Atakebune ship model

The Murakami clan trace their lineage to Minamoto no Yorikiyo, a samurai and official of mid-Heian Period who also the second son of Minamoto no Yorinobu.

The Murakami clan was known for their activities were transport, disrupting alliances between rival lords by plundering ships and destroying diplomatic letters. On the other side, they also guarding passage to those who paid their service tolls through the straits of the Geiyo Islands, which they treated as checkpoints (札浦, sappo). In peacetime, they also engaged in fishing.

== Innoshima Murakami ==
The Innoshima Murakami clan was a clan based in Mukaijima and Innoshima. In the mid-15th century, they cooperated with the Kono clan (河野氏), the guardian of Iyo Province, in an attack on Sarei Castle (佐礼城; in present-day Tamagawa, Ehime) . They were also ordered by Yamana Tokihiro, the shugo of Bingo Province, to guard ships sent to Ming China. Later, they strengthened their ties with the Yamana clan, the Ouchi clan, and then the Mori clan.

== Kurushima Murakami ==
The Kurushima Murakami clan was a clan based on Kurushima Island. The first mention of the clan in historical records dates back to 1404, when they were contracted to manage the Yugeshima shōen (present-day Kamijima, Ehime).

During the Sengoku period, Murakami Michiyasu served under the Kono clan, but his son, Kurushima Michifusa defected from the Kono clan after being persuaded by Toyotomi Hideyoshi. Later, Michifusa served on the seas as a daimyo, taking part in battles such as the siege of Odawara and the Imjin War, but was killed in the battle of Myeongnyang.

== Noshima Murakami ==
The Noshima Murakami clan was based in Noshima and its surrounding areas. The first mention of the clan in historical records dates back to 1349, when they served as guards for an envoy from Toji Temple in Kyoto, who was also the lord of the shōen on Yugeshima in Iyo Province.

In the 1520s, the Hosokawa clan recognized Noshima control over Shiwaku, where they developed it into a way station for travellers and sailors.

The Noshima Murakami clan did not become a navy under the control of a specific feudal lord, instead maintaining autonomy through their control over the seas by guaranteeing the safety of navigation in exchange for collecting traffic toll.

(Murakami Takeyoshi) is the greatest pirate in all of Japan. He lives in a grand fortress and possesses many retainers, holdings, and ships that continually fly across the waves. His name is the Noshima Lord.

' Luis Frois

In 1576, the Noshima helped break the Oda clan blockade and deliver provisions to the Ikkō-ikki citadel of Ishiyama Hongan-ji. They proceeded to capture a castle near Utazu, which allowed them to control the harbour. From 1579 until 1582, they worked for the Mori clan to block the Inland Sea from any of Oda Nobunaga's ships.

In the two successive Battles of Kizugawaguchi that resulted from the blockade, the Murakami pirates supported Mōri Terumoto. Murakami Takeyoshi led the Mori navy in the second battle against the Oda clan. However, they later entered into negotiations with the Oda, sending Nobunaga a baby hawk, which was a symbol of loyal service.

In 1586, Portuguese missionary Luís Fróis expressed his fear of travelling through the Inland Sea without flying the Noshima flag. The Noshima leader at the time was Murakami Takeyoshi, and flying their flag was often seen as the only way to ensure safety at sea.

== Sengoku period to Edo period ==
In 1453, a figure with Murakami surname and court title of Bitchu-no-Kami, who believed to be of the titular leader of Innoshima Murakami clan, was rewarded by Hosokawa Katsumoto of the Muromachi shogunate for his loyalty and facilitating the return of the Shugo clan to Iyo Province. Later, as the influence of the shogunate weakened, the Innoshima Murakami clan came under the control of a Sengoku daimyo. At the time of the Ōnin War, it is possible that they were already operating under the command of the Ōuchi clan, whose influence was expanding in the waters around the Seto Inland Sea, and as "lords of the sea", they supported the Ouchi clan's military power at sea. The Murakami clan pirates then influenced maritime logistics, resulting in the mid-16th century piracy in Japan.

The Murakami clans became very dominant in Geiyo Islands chain in 15th-16th century.

After Michifusa's death in the Imjin War, Nagachika (later Yasuchika) succeeded him as head of the Kurushima Murakami clan, but because he sided with the Western Army in the battle of Sekigahara, he was transferred to Mori Domain (Bungo) by the new regime. Michiharu changed his surname to "Kurushima". The Kurushima clan managed to maintain its connection to the sea through the Kurushima family's territories in present-day Beppu and parts of Hiji in Oita Prefecture.

The Innoshima Murakami and Noshima Murakami clans also sided with the Western Army at the Battle of Sekigahara and were subsequently incorporated into the Mōri clan. The two clans were organized into the Hagi domain 's ship-guarding unit, tasked with guarding the domain lord's royal ships, towing Korean envoys, and dealing with drifting ships. The Noshima Murakami clan in particular served as the head of the ship-guarding unit for approximately 250 years during the Edo period.

== Modern day ==
Japanese politician Seiichiro Murakami, claims to be the 18th generation of the Murakami clan.

Murakami Kaizoku Museum on the island of Ōshima in Imabari, Ehime Prefecture, Japan, dedicated to the Murakami Kaizoku, the Murakami Clan "pirates" or "feudal navies" (suigun).

On March 13, 2015 , the maritime pass issued by Murakami Takeyoshi to Mukai Dan'emon-no-jo of the Saiga clan in 1581, entitled "Kasho Senki (Flag of a Passing Ship) March 28, was designated an Important Cultural Property of Japan.

In 2024, A large number of kawarake (unglazed, low-fired earthenware sake cup or dish that used in Shinto rituals) artifacts which believed to be Murakami's was found in Noshima castle.
