= Murakami Kaizoku Museum =

- 今治市村上海賊ミュージアム
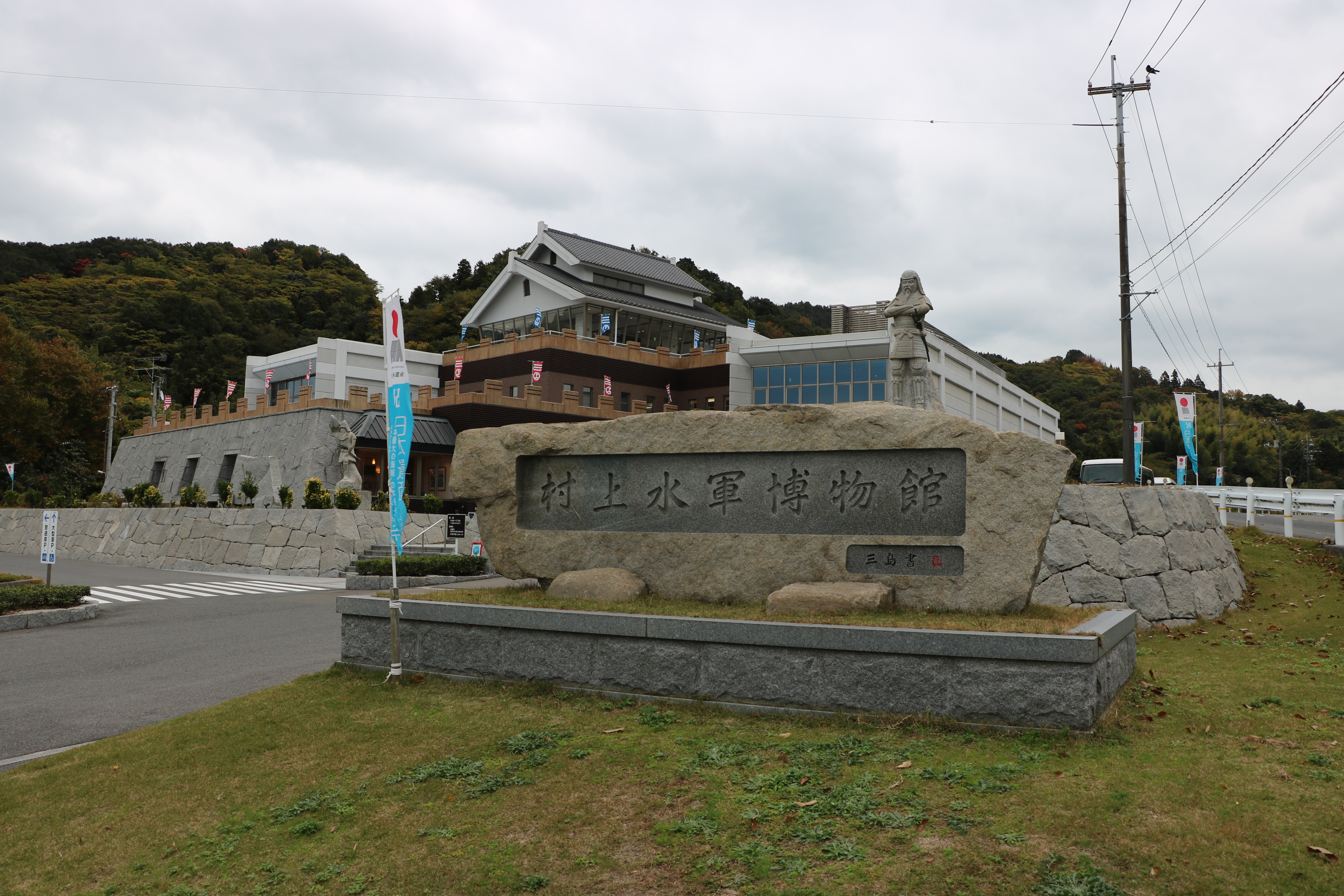

General information
- Location: 1285 Miyakubo, Miyakubo-chō, Imabari, Ehime Prefecture, Japan
- Coordinates: 34°10′08″N 133°05′16″E
- Opened: October 2004

Website
- Official website (ja)

The Murakami Kaizoku Museum (今治市村上海賊ミュージアム, Imabari-shi Murakami Kaizoku Myūjiamu) is a museum on the island of Ōshima in Imabari, Ehime Prefecture, Japan, dedicated to the Murakami Kaizoku, the Murakami Clan "pirates" or "feudal navies" (suigun). The museum opened as the Imabari City Murakami Suigun Museum (今治市村上水軍博物館) in 2004, replacing the nearby Museum of Noshima Murakami Suigun (能島村上水軍資料館), and changed to its current name on 1 April 2020. The collection and displays include arms and armour, historic documents, and scale model boats.

== See also ==
- Noshima Murakami
- Japan Heritage #036
- Noshima
- Kurushima
- Innoshima
