= Noshima Castle =

Castle ruins in Imabari, Japan

- 能島城
- Imabari, Ehime, Ehime Prefecture, Japan
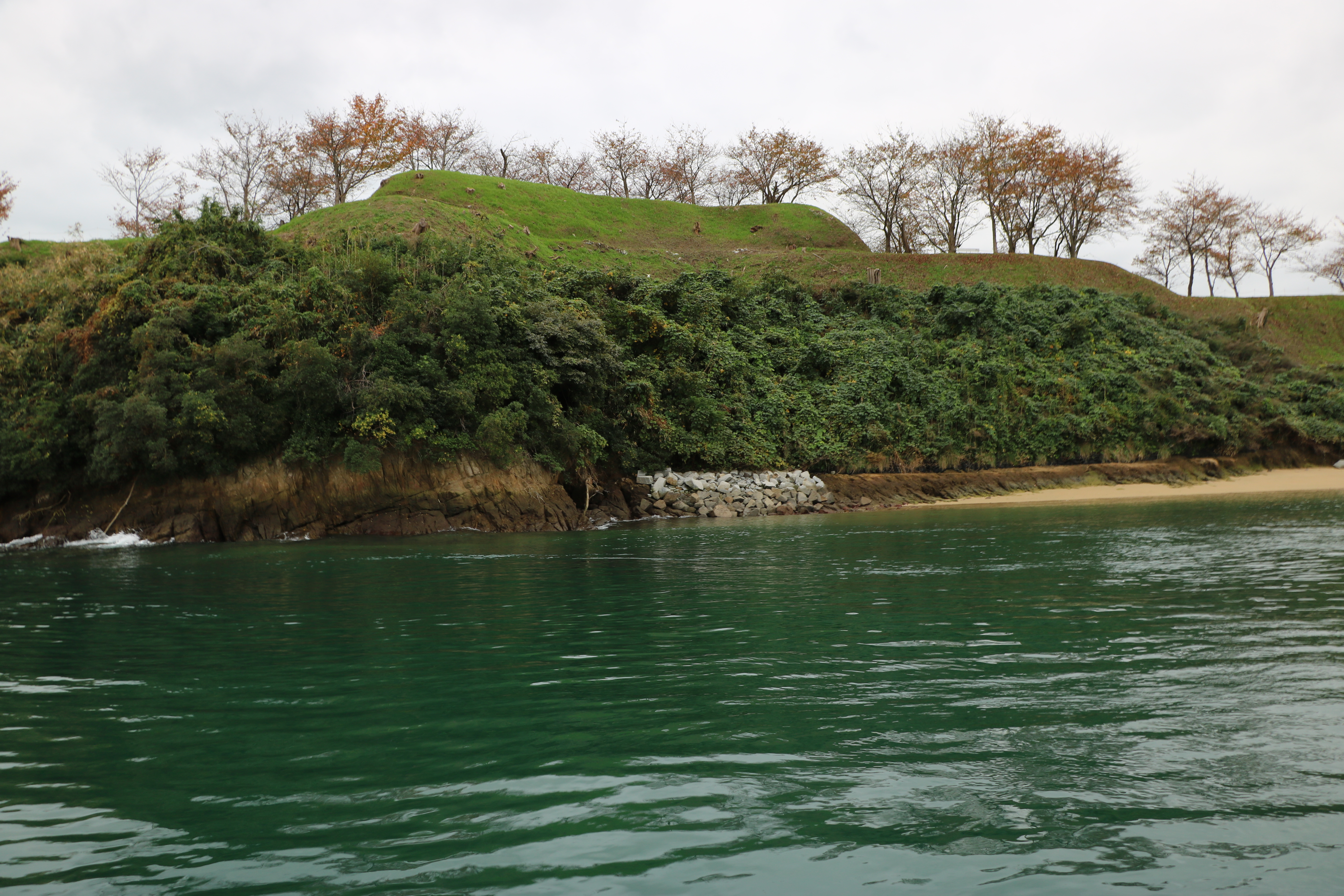
- Noshima Castle

Site information
- Type: Japanese castle
- Owner: Noshima Murakami clan
- Condition: ruins

Location
- Noshima Castle
- Location within Ehime Prefecture Location within Japan
- Coordinates: 34.183°N 133.081°E
- Height: 北緯34度10分58秒 東経133度4分51秒

Site history
- Built: 14C?
- Built by: Murakami Yoshihiro
- Demolished: 1588

Garrison information
- Past commanders: Murakami Takeyoshi

Noshima Castle (能島城, Noshima-jō) was a Sengoku period Japanese castle in Ehime Prefecture, Japan, located on an island in the Seto Inland Sea. It was the stronghold of the Noshima Murakami, a maritime clan of sailors and sometimes pirates or mercenaries. The ruins of Noshima Castle were designated as a National Historic Site in 1953.

== History ==
Noshima Castle extends over all of Noshima island, which dominates the narrow straight between Hakatajima and Ujima, just at the south of the major sea route in the Geiyo Islands. These small islands were used as a crossing between Shikoku and Honshu since ancient times and provided safe anchorage for ships to pass typhoons or storms; on the other hand, the narrow channels between the islands were hazardous due to undersea rocks and shoals and unpredictable currents, so the islands also formed a natural restriction on traffic on the Seto Inland Sea. Because of these reasons, the maritime peoples of the islands prospered from marine transportation and commerce, and also acted as navigators of passing ships with tolls, supplementing their income with occasional piracy. Due times of war, they served as a mercenary naval force. During the Muromachi period, one of the major clans dominating the islands was the Murakami clan. The Murakami were divided into three houses, with the Kurushima Murakami clan which was the closest to Shikoku, and who owed fealty to the Kōno clan, who had been appointed as shugo of Iyo Province from the Kamakura period, the Innoshima Murakami clan owed fealty to the Mōri clan which held Onomichi area in Honshu, and the Noshima Murakami clan, who kept a neutral position and who cultivated relations directly with the Muromachi shogunate.

In 1499, Shogun Ashikaga Yoshitane was expelled from Kyoto due to an attempted coup by the Hosokawa clan and found refuge at Noshima Castle en route to rally allied forces from the Ouchi clan in Suo Province. In his counter-attack against the Hosokawa, Murakami Masafusa (1413–1515) provided naval support and reconstructed Noshima Castle as a base of operations. The surface of the island was flattened into three terraces and the three ridges of the island extending from the center were enclosed with stone walls to form enclosures. An anchorage was developed on the north shore of the island, which was more sheltered against the strong currents. The main residence of the Noshima Murakami was on the neighboring island of Hakatajima, and shipyards and warehouses were constructed on Ujima. Watchtowers were erected on several smaller surrounding islands. Noshima Castle was used primarily as an inner bailey in times of war.

In the Sengoku period, the Noshima Murakami provided invaluable support to the Mōri clan at the 1555 Battle of Miyajima. In the 1576 Battles of Kizugawaguchi, the Murakami defeated the Kuki navy which was allied to Oda Nobunaga, however, in the subsequent 1578 battle, they were defeated when Nobunaga produced six ships protected by armored plates. Toyotomi Hideyoshi was dispatched to conquer the Mōri, and initially attempted to bring the Murakami to his side. The Kurushima Murakami defected to Hideyoshi, but the Noshima Murakami remained loyal to the Mōri. After Hideyoshi's victory, he deprived the Noshima Murakami of Noshima Castle and forced them to depart to Mōri territory in 1588. Noshima Castle was abandoned and the island uninhabited since.

The island can be reached only by sightseeing boat from Miyaura port. The exterior of the island can be seen from the daily sightseeing ship, but landing on the island is only permitted by a guided tour which needs prior booking.

The castle ruins were listed as one of the Continued Top 100 Japanese Castles in 2017.

== See also ==
- List of Historic Sites of Japan (Ehime)

== Literature ==
- De Lange, William (2021). An Encyclopedia of Japanese Castles. Groningen: Toyo Press. pp. 600 pages. ISBN 978-9492722300.
- Schmorleitz, Morton S. (1974). Castles in Japan. Tokyo: Charles E. Tuttle Co. pp. 144–145. ISBN 0-8048-1102-4.
- Motoo, Hinago (1986). Japanese Castles. Tokyo: Kodansha. p. 200 pages. ISBN 0-87011-766-1.
- Mitchelhill, Jennifer (2004). Castles of the Samurai: Power and Beauty. Tokyo: Kodansha. p. 112 pages. ISBN 4-7700-2954-3.
- Turnbull, Stephen (2003). Japanese Castles 1540-1640. Osprey Publishing. p. 64 pages. ISBN 1-84176-429-9.
