= Noshima =

Japanese island

Native name: 能島
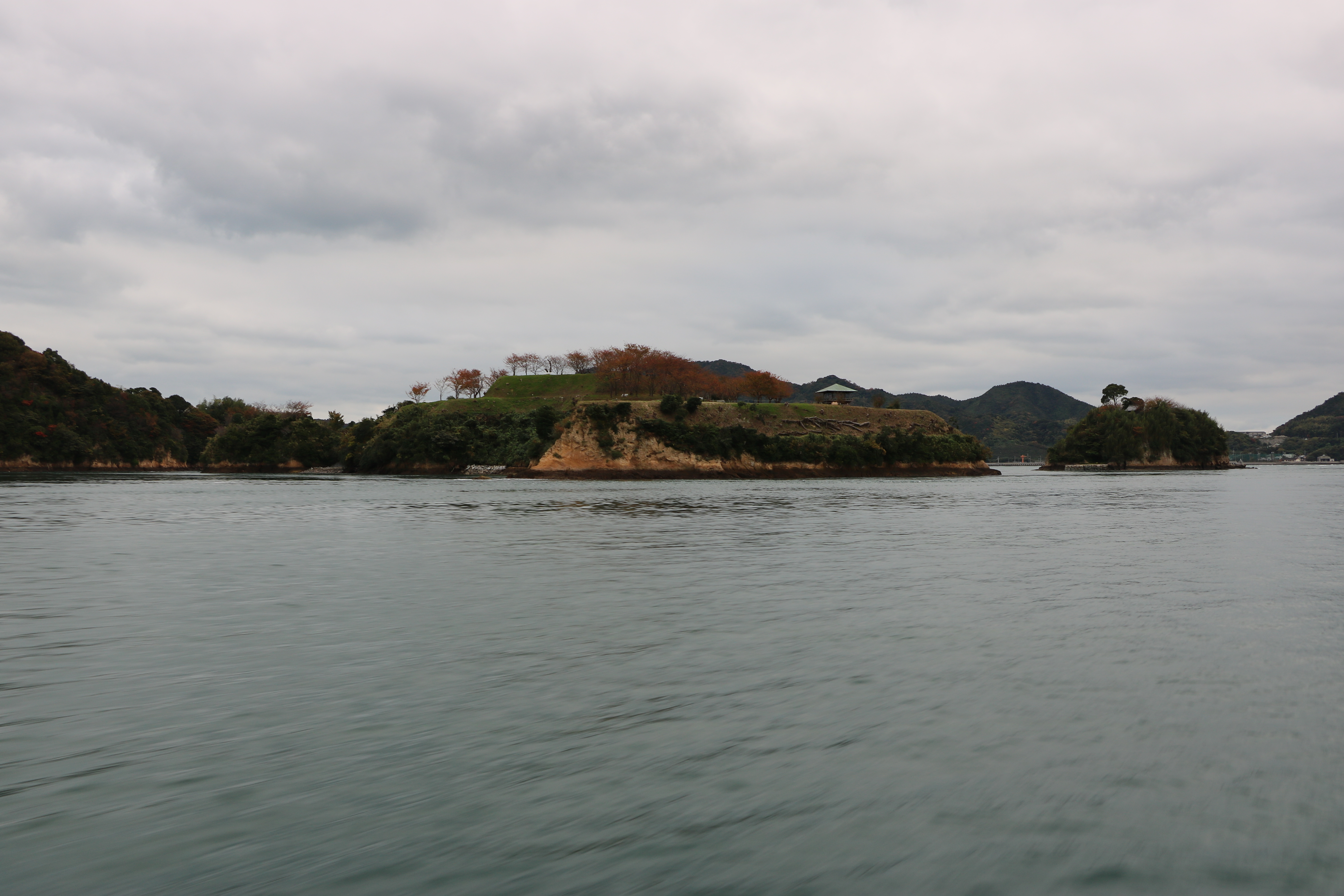
- Noshima viewed form the northwest

- Location within Ehime Prefecture Location within Japan

Geography
- Location: Seto Inland Sea, Japan
- Coordinates: 34°10′58″N 133°04′51″E
- Archipelago: Japanese archipelago
- Area: 0.015 km^{2} (0.0058 sq mi)
- Coastline: 0.85 km (0.528 mi)

Administration
- Japan
- Prefecture: Ehime Prefecture
- City: Imabari

Demographics
- Population: uninhabited (2019)

Noshima (能島) is a small, uninhabited island within the Geiyo Islands of the Japanese Inland Sea. Administratively, it forms part of the city of Imabari, Ehime Prefecture. In the late mediaeval period, the island was occupied by Noshima Castle and, together with the surrounding area, was the base of the Noshima Murakami, one of the three main houses of the Murakami kaizoku. In his Historia de Iapam, Luís Fróis described Noximadono (i.e., the lord of Noshima) as o mayor corsario de todo Japaõ, "the greatest corsair in all Japan". The island castle, together with tiny Taizakijima immediately to the south, has been designated a National Historic Site, and is an element of Japan Heritage "Story" #036, while Noshima is also afforded protection as a Class I Special Zone within Setonaikai National Park. There is no scheduled service to the island, which may be approached by a vessel chartered from Miyakubo Port (宮窪港) on nearby Ōshima.

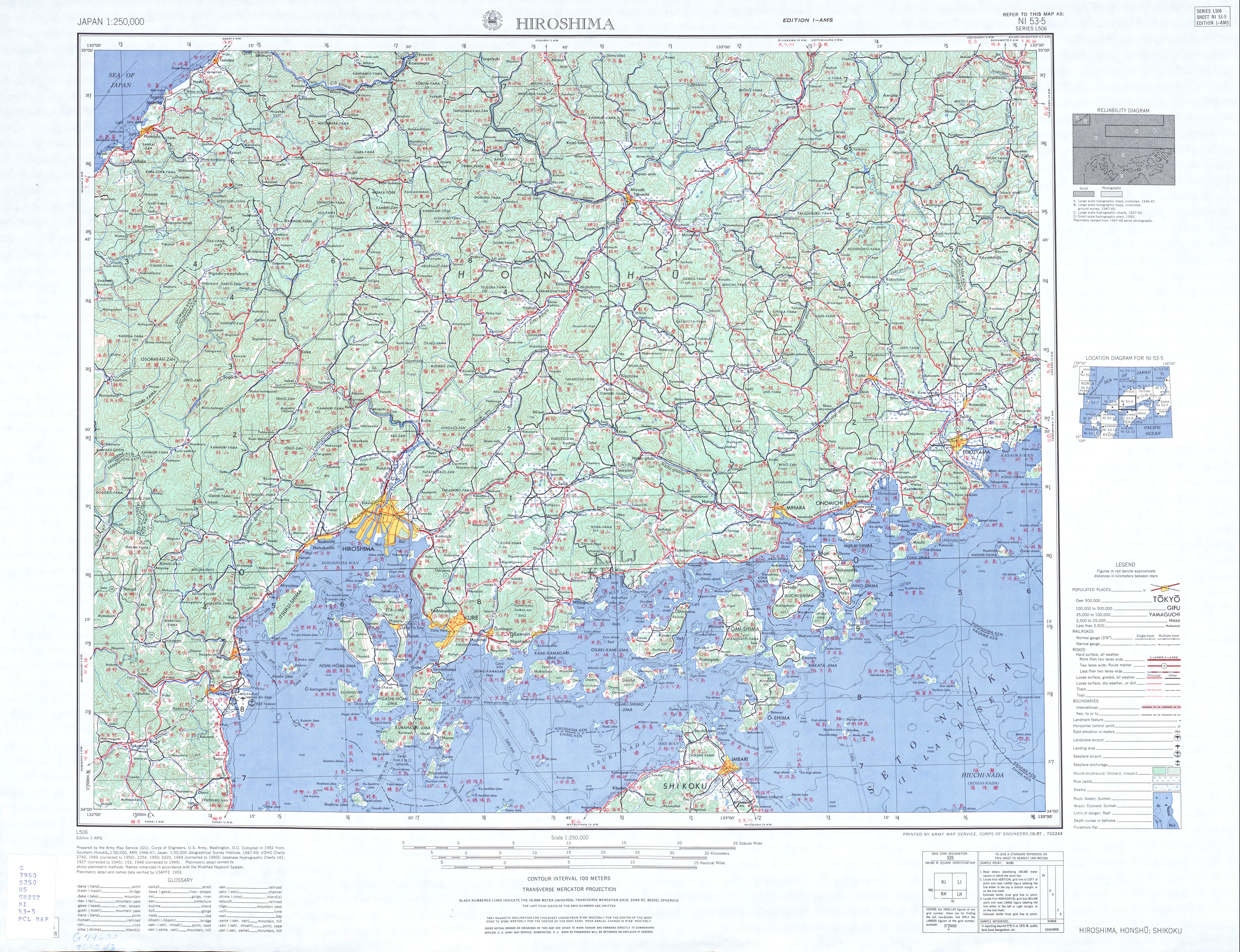
1953 US AMS map showing Hiroshima Prefecture and, across the sea to the south, Imabari in Ehime Prefecture; Noshima is the small unmarked island towards the bottom right, between "Ō-shima" and "U-shima"

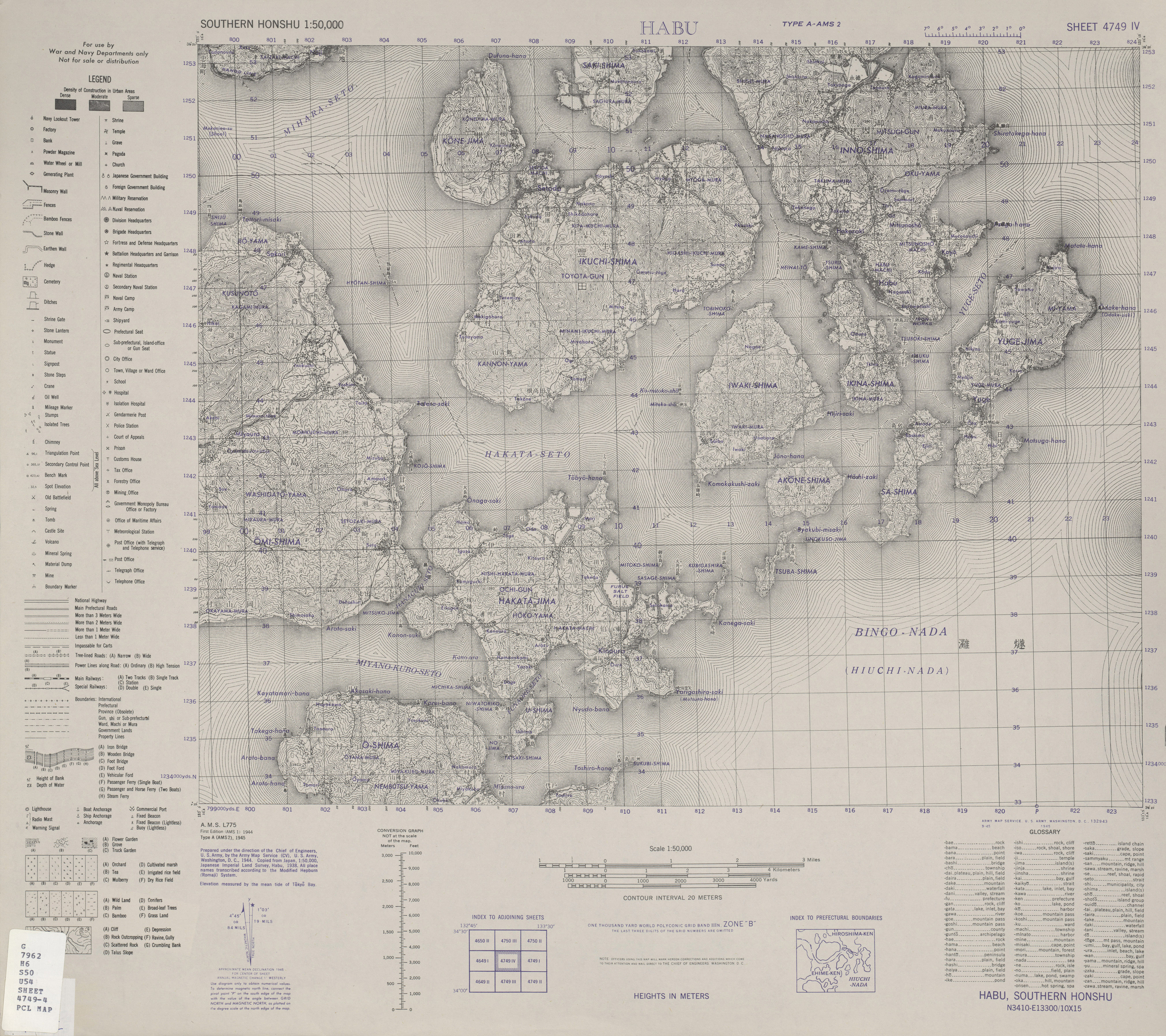
1945 US AMS map showing, near the bottom, "No Jima", between "Ō-shima" and "U-shima", and "Taisaki-Shima", immediately to the south

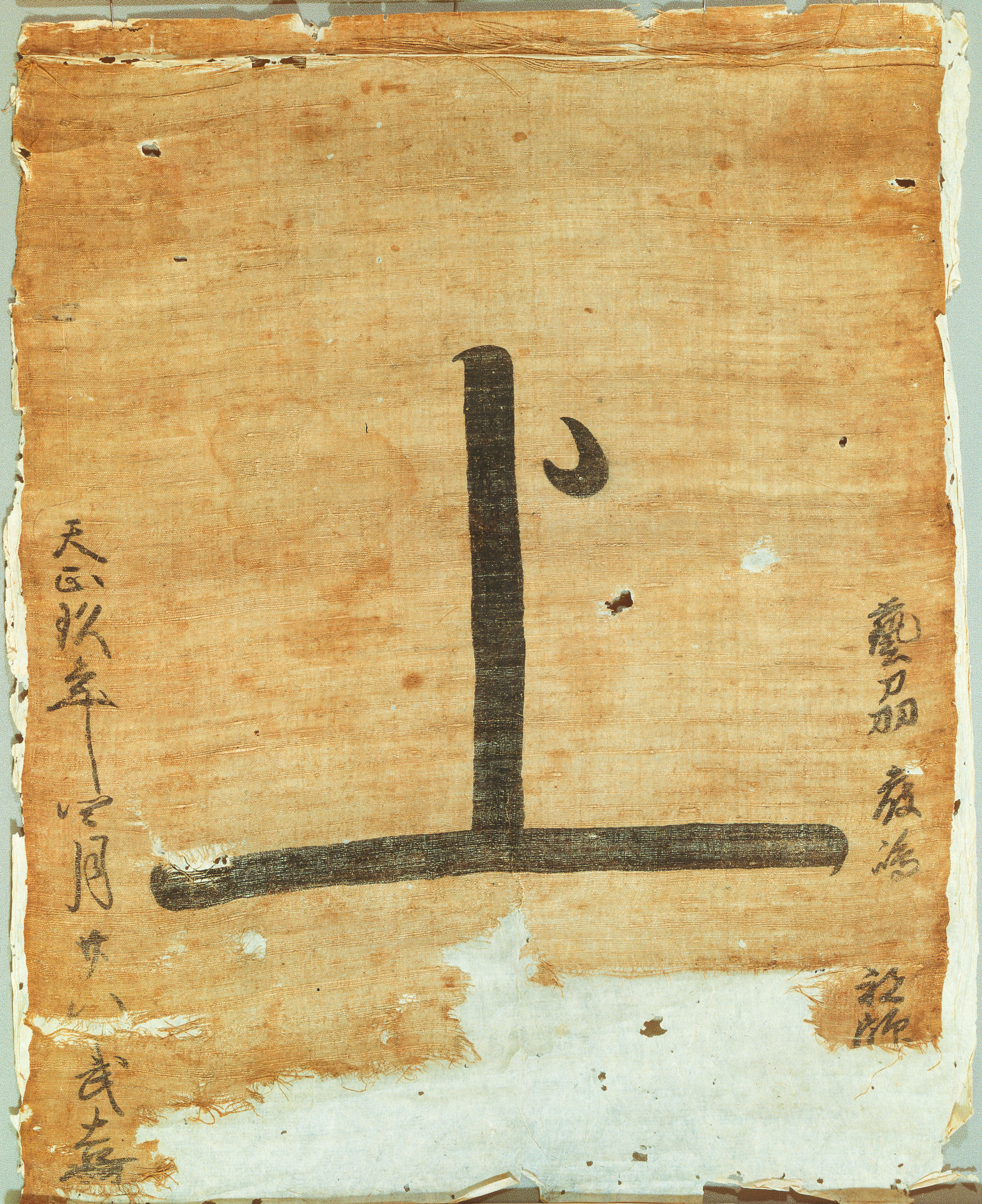
Noshima Murakami "flag pass", issued to a priest at Itsukushima in Aki Province and dated to Tenshō 9.4.28 (1581), followed by the signature Takeyoshi (Yamaguchi Prefectural Archives)

== See also ==
- Setonaikai National Park
- List of Historic Sites of Japan (Ehime)
- Kurushima
- Innoshima
