= Nebria lewisi =

Scientific classification
- Domain: Eukaryota
- Kingdom: Animalia
- Phylum: Arthropoda
- Class: Insecta
- Order: Coleoptera
- Suborder: Adephaga
- Family: Carabidae
- Genus: Nebria
- Species: N. lewisi

Binomial name
- Nebria lewisi Bates, 1874

Species of beetle

Nebria lewisi is a species of ground beetle in the Nebriinae subfamily that is endemic to Kikuma, Ehime of Japan. The species is orange coloured with black pronotum, and is 12 millimetres (0.47 in) in length.
