= Nagahama Castle (Izu) =

- 長浜城
- Numazu, Shizuoka, Japan
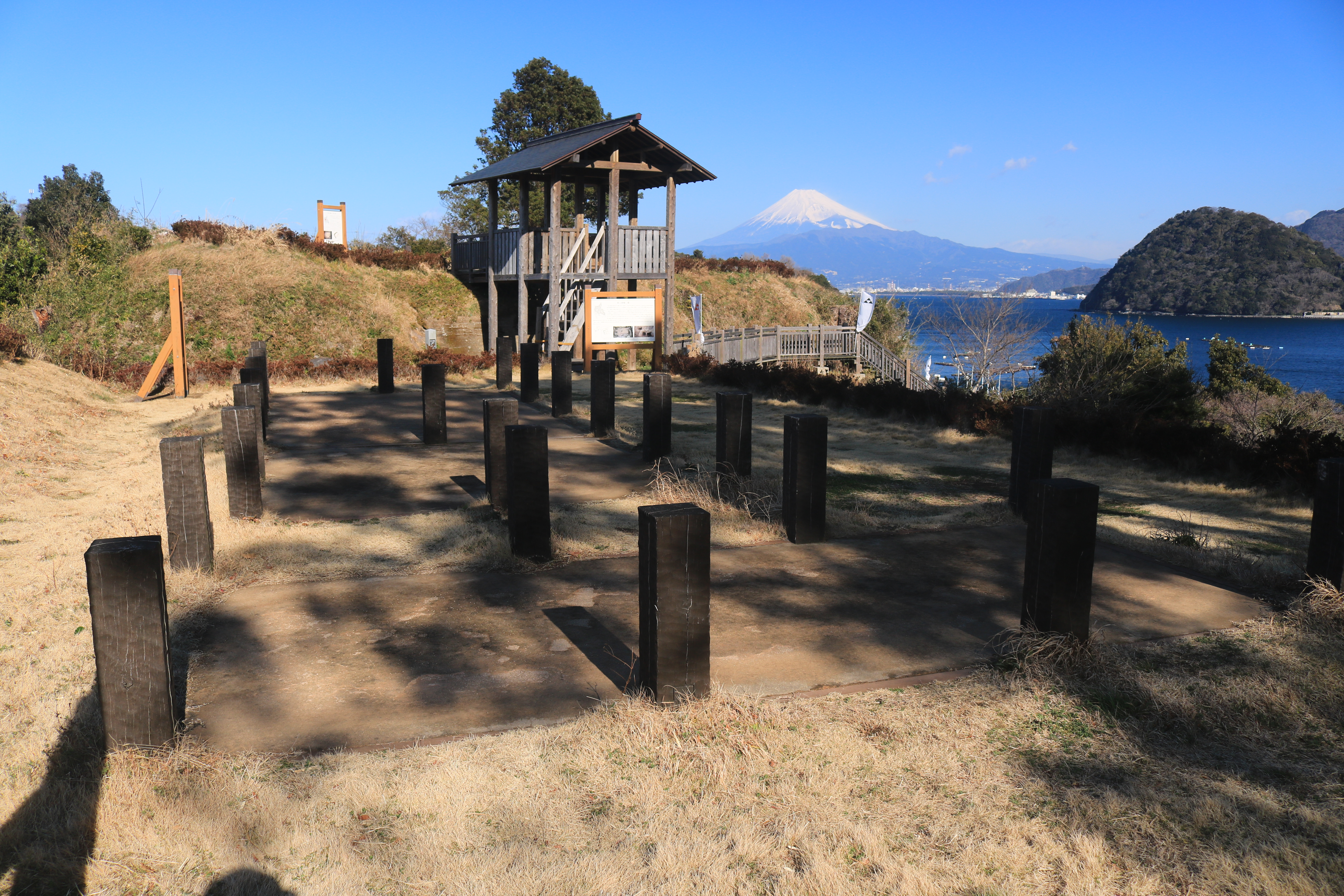
- Nagahama Castle (2nd Kuruwa) and Mount Fuji.jpg

Site information
- Type: Japanese castle
- Controlled by: late Hōjō clan
- Condition: Ruins

Location
- Coordinates: 35°01′05″N 138°53′18″E

Site history
- In use: 1590

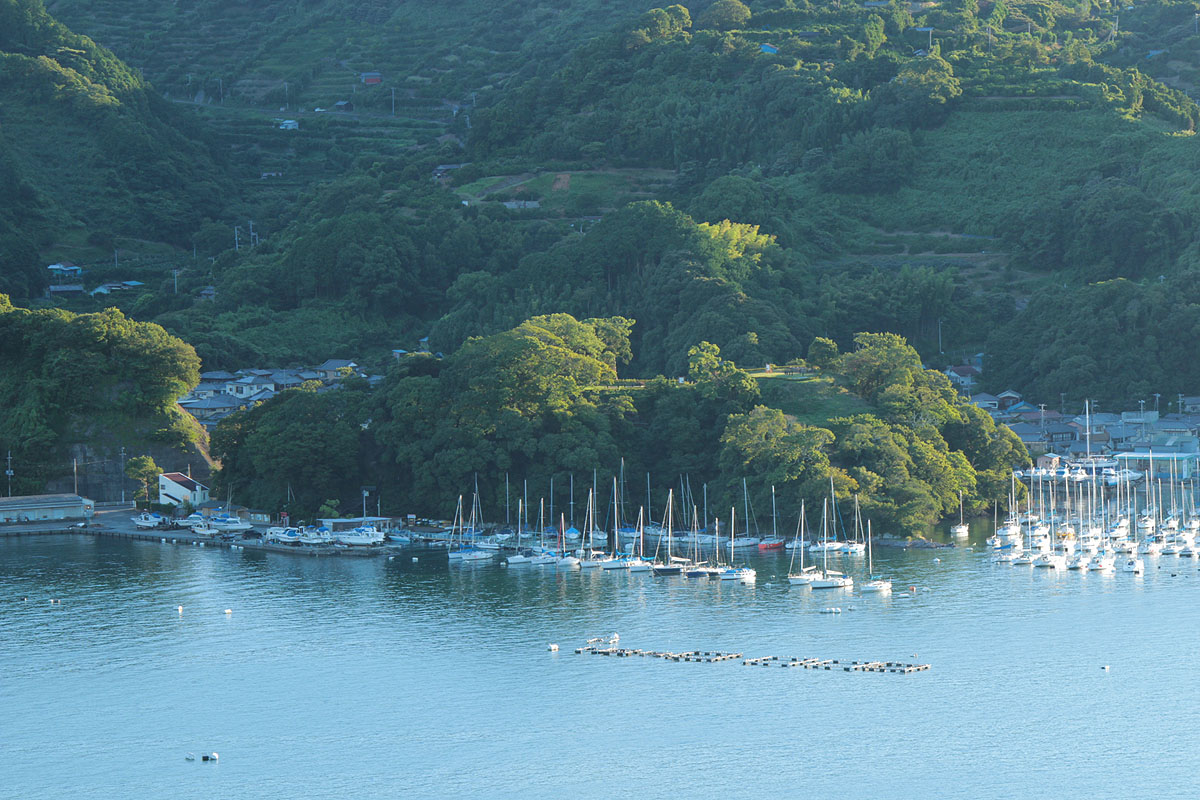
Nagahama Castle form the sea

Nagahama Castle (長浜城, Nagahama-jō) was a Sengoku period flatland-style Japanese castle located in what is now part of the city of Numazu, Shizuoka prefecture. The ruins have been protected as a National Historic Site since 1988, with the area under protection extended in 2002.

== Overview ==
Nagahama Castle is located on a small hill with an elevation of 30 meters on Suruga Bay south of downtown Numazu. The castle is very small, with a length of only 100 meters. and consists of terraces built along the contour of the hill, protected by clay walls and dry moats. Vulnerable portions of the ramparts were faced with cut stone. The route to the inner bailey zigzagged through the second and third bailey, with gates in between. The top of the castle overlooks the anchorage of Uchiura, which was strategic for the Late Hōjō clan and later the Takeda clan.

== History ==
In the 1570s, the Late Hōjō clan based at Odawara Castle in Sagami province and the Takeda clan from Kai Province went to war over the disputed territories of the former Imagawa clan in Suruga Province. The Takeda clan occupied most of Suruga from 1569 and had inherited the Imagawa navy; however the Hōjō clan also had a powerful navy, with which it controlled Sagami Bay and waged war against the Satomi clan of Awa Province. In the 1570s, the Takeda reached an agreement with the Satomi, which allowed them to shift their fleet to Suruga Province, and constructed Nagahama Castle, on the border of Izu and Suruga as a base of operations. Although the Hōjō clan was unable to destroy the Takeda navy, their fleet was able to keep the Takeda fleet largely bound to port.

After the fall of the Takeda clan in 1582, the Hōjō clan came into conflict with Oda Nobunaga and his successor, Toyotomi Hideyoshi. Hideyoshi's forces included the Kuki clan based in Shima Province and the Murakami clan based in the Seto Inland Sea, the two strongest naval powers in Sengoku Japan. During the 1590 Siege of Odawara, the Hōjō navy faced overwhelming odds and surrendered at Nagahama Castle and at Shimoda. Nagahama Castle was abandoned soon afterwards.

The site is a five-minute walk from the "jōkabashi" bus stop on the Izuhakone Bus from Numazu Station.

== Gallery ==
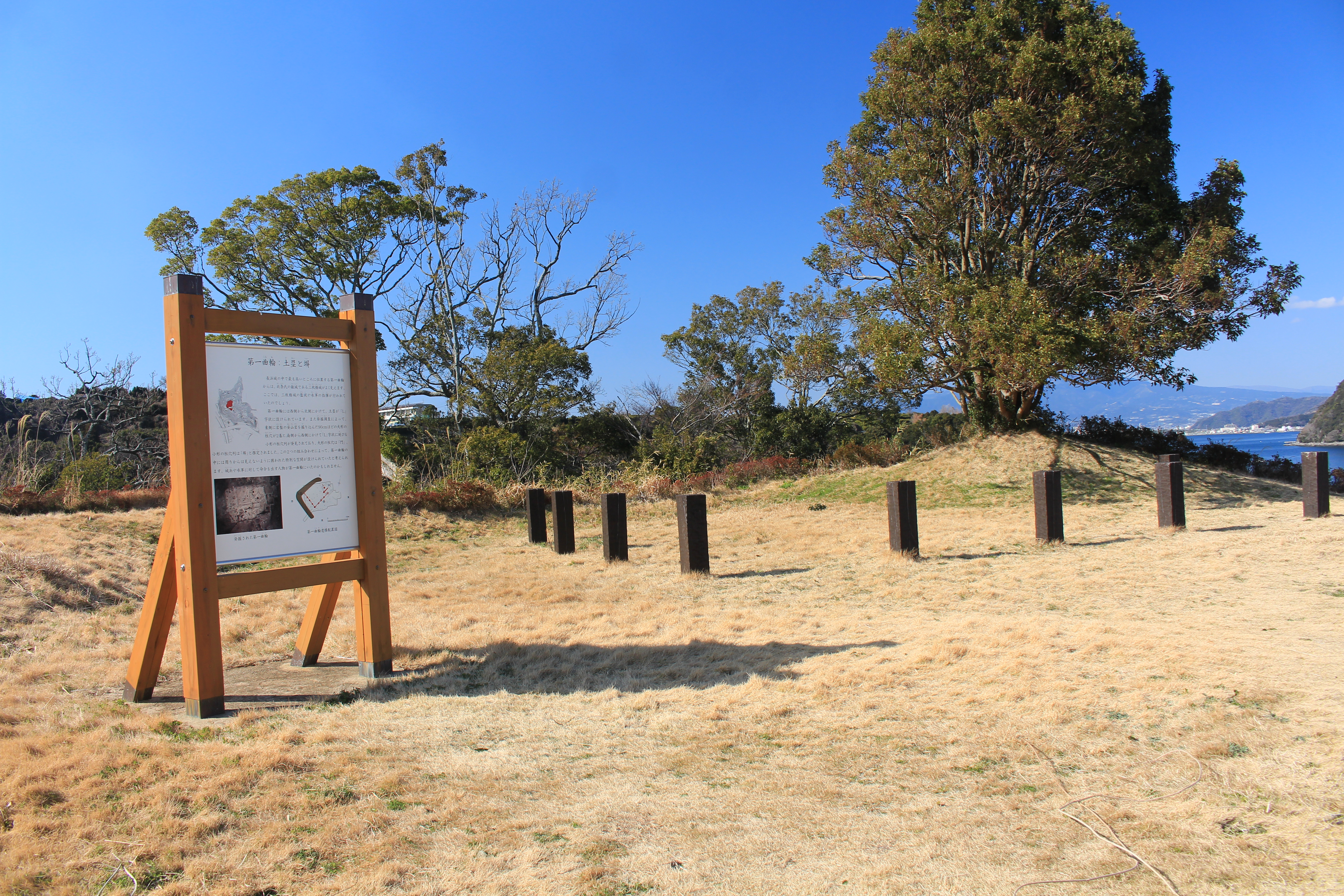
1st Kuruwa

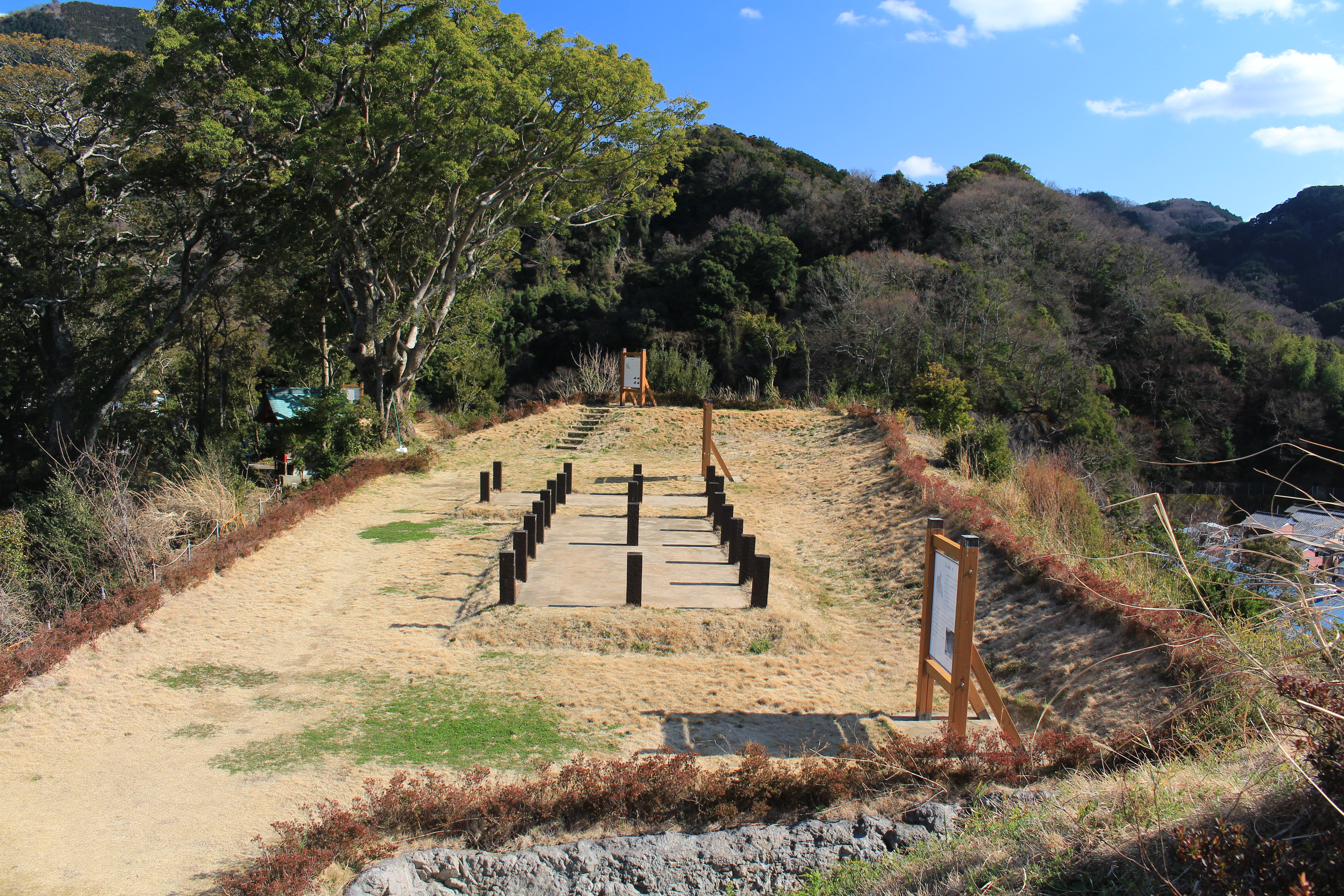
2nd Kuruwa

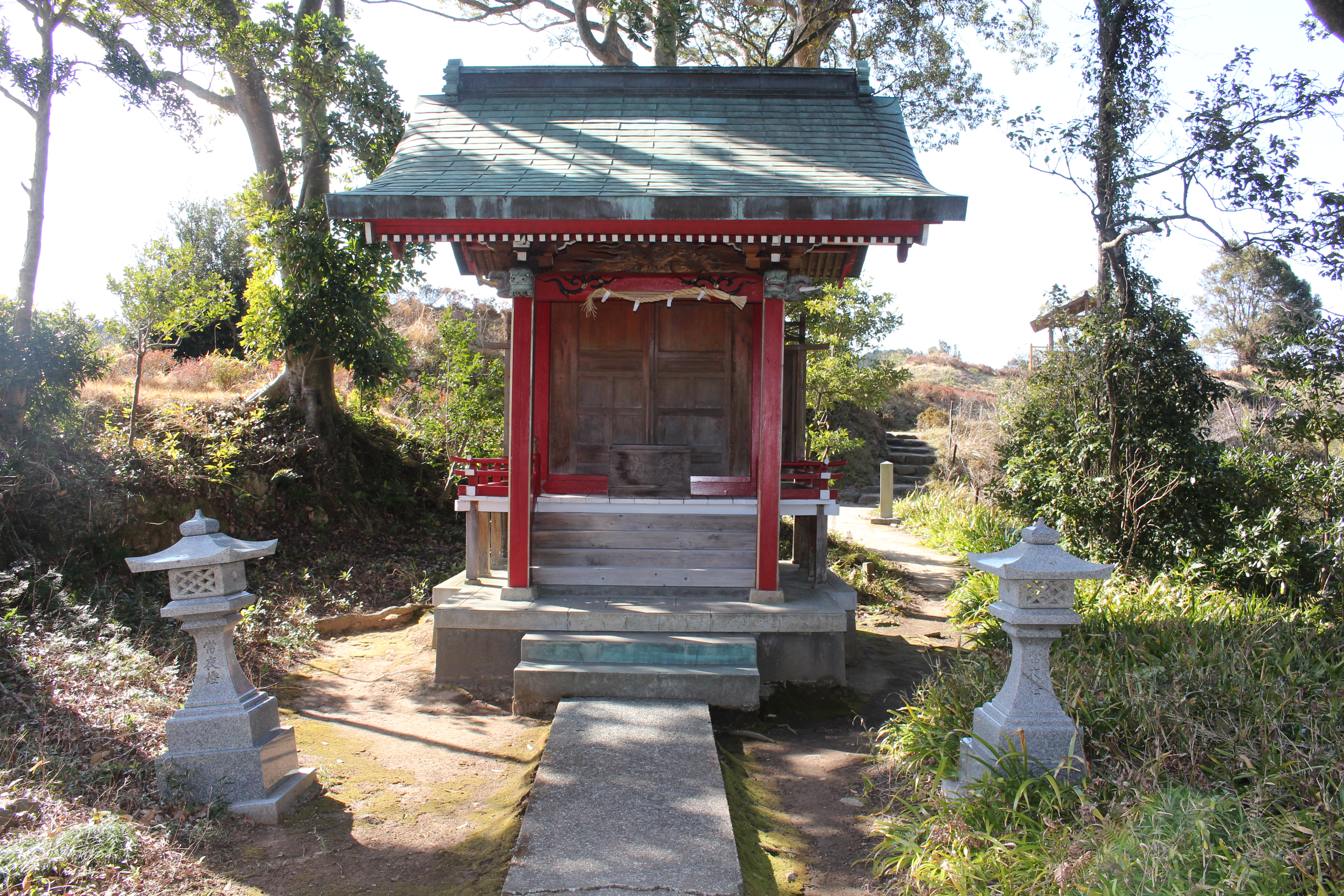
3rd Kuruwa with Shinto shrine

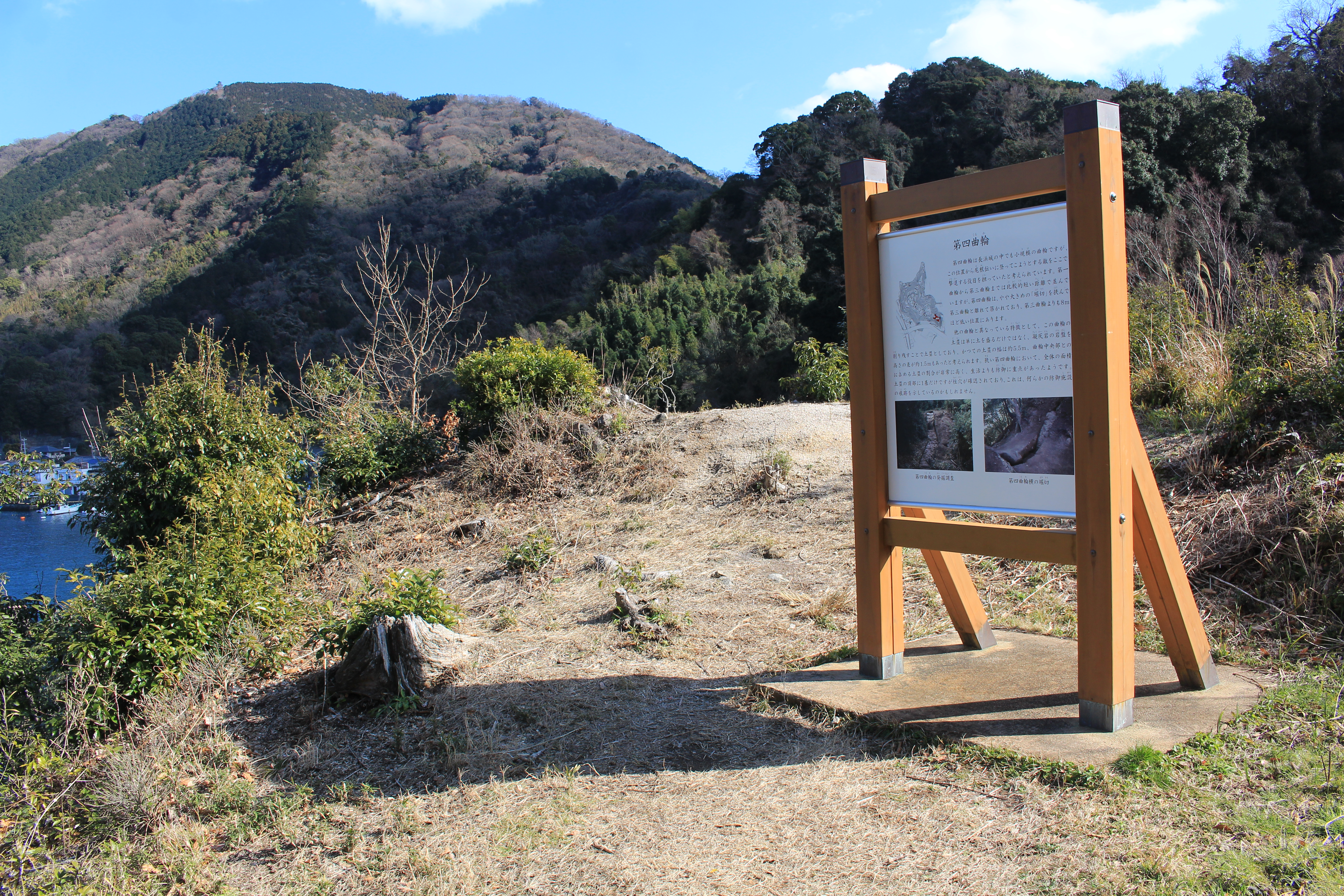
4th Kuruwa

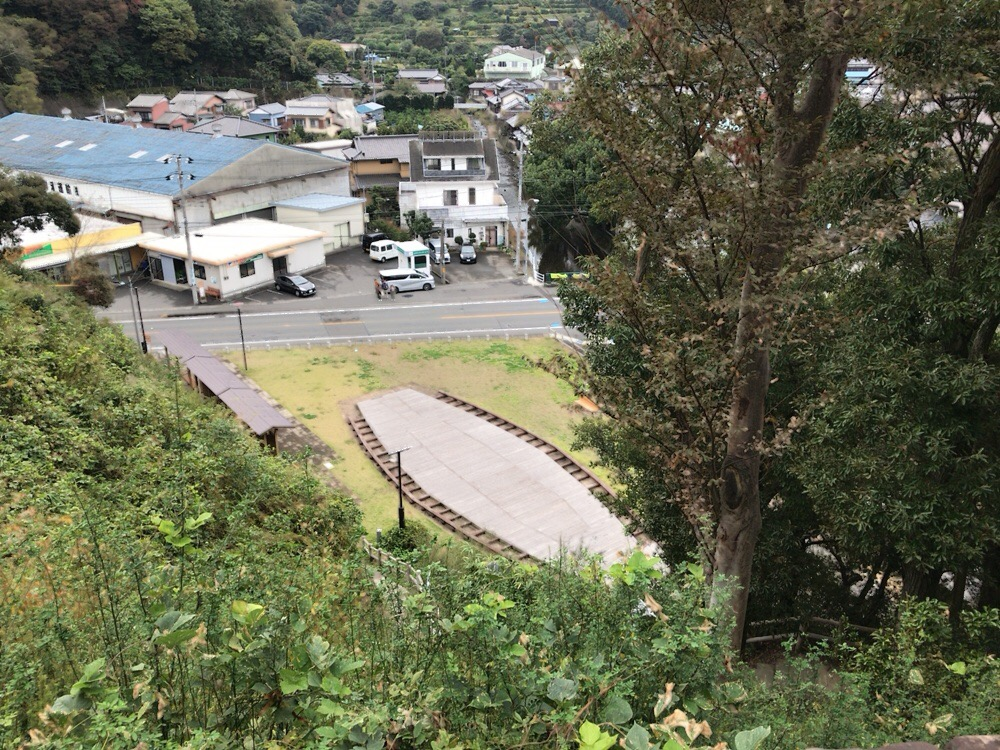
Full-scale model of Atakebune

== See also ==
- List of Historic Sites of Japan (Shizuoka)

== Bibliography ==
- Schmorleitz, Morton S. (1974). Castles in Japan. Tokyo: Charles E. Tuttle Co. pp. 144–145. ISBN 0-8048-1102-4.
- Motoo, Hinago (1986). Japanese Castles. Tokyo: Kodansha. p. 200 pages. ISBN 0-87011-766-1.
- Turnbull, Stephen (2003). Japanese Castles 1540-1640. Osprey Publishing. p. 64 pages. ISBN 1-84176-429-9.
