= Ōnishi, Ehime =

Dissolved municipality in Ehime prefecture, Japan

Ōnishi (大西町, Ōnishi-chō) was a town located in Ochi District, Ehime Prefecture, Japan.

As of 2003, the town had an estimated population of 8,640 and a density of 459.33 persons per km^{2}. The total area was 18.81 km^{2}.

On January 16, 2005, Ōnishi, along with the towns of Hakata, Kamiura, Kikuma, Miyakubo, Namikata, Ōmishima, Tamagawa and Yoshiumi, and the villages of Asakura and Sekizen (all from Ochi District), was merged into the expanded city of Imabari and no longer exists as an independent municipality.

Between 1990 and 1994, a kofun, Myokensan, was excavated. The kofun is a Yayoi period (1000 BC - 300 AD) stone burial mound, and it and its information centre is located within Fujiyama Citizen Park, close to Ōnishi Station.
