= Namikata, Ehime =

Dissolved municipality in Ehime prefecture, Japan

Namikata (波方町, Namikata-chō) was a town located in Ochi District, Ehime Prefecture, Japan.

As of 2003, the town had an estimated population of 9,794 and a density of 625.02 persons per km^{2}. The total area was 15.67 km^{2}.

On January 16, 2005, Namikata, along with the towns of Hakata, Kamiura, Kikuma, Miyakubo, Ōmishima, Ōnishi, Tamagawa and Yoshiumi, and the villages of Asakura and Sekizen (all from Ochi District), was merged into the expanded city of Imabari and no longer exists as an independent municipality.
