= Imabari Meitoku Junior College =

Private junior college in Imabari, Ehime, Japan

Coordinates: 34°03′37″N 132°58′10″E

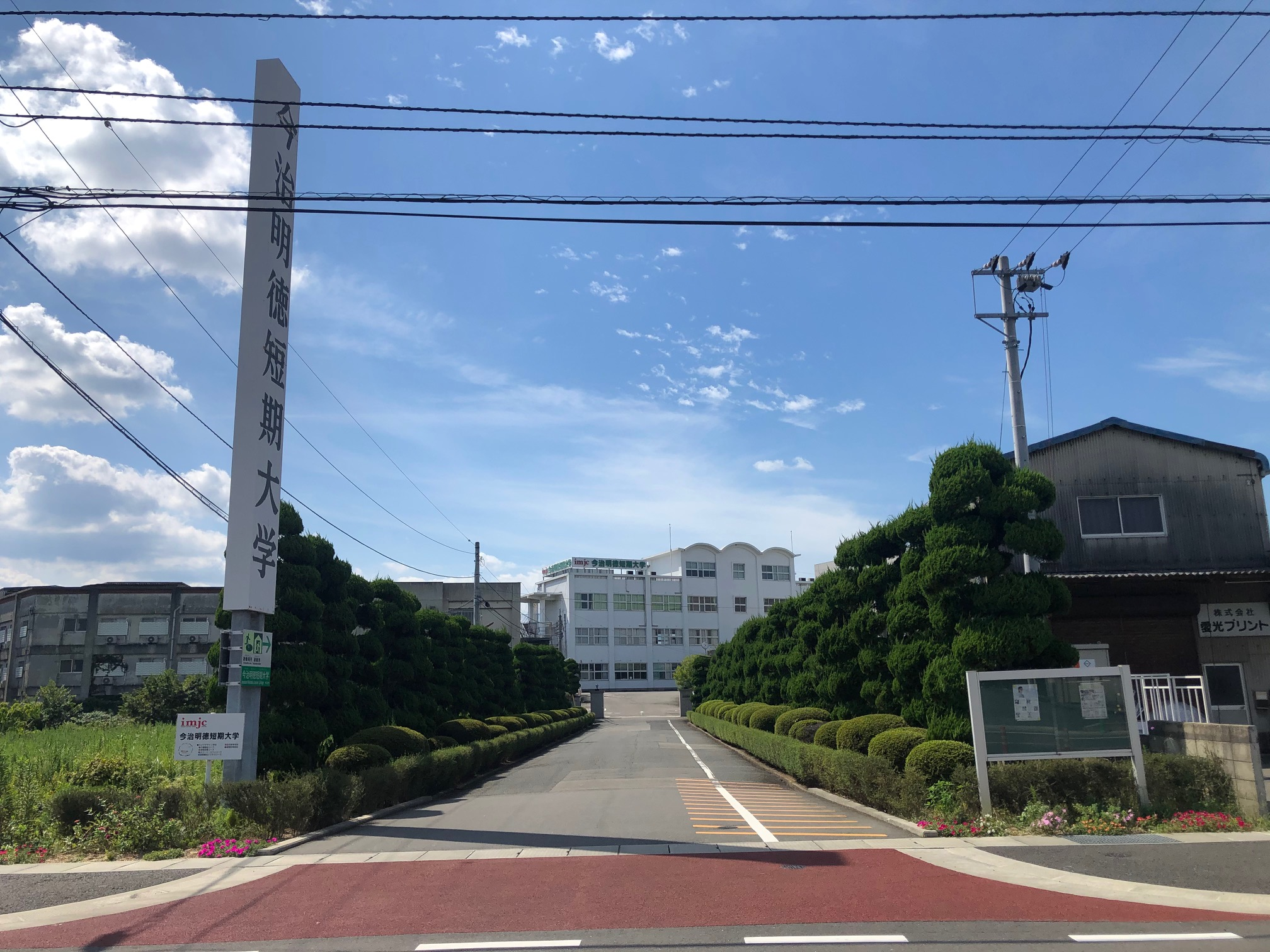

Imabari Meitoku Junior College (今治明徳短期大学, Imabari meitoku tanki daigaku) is a private junior college in Imabari, Ehime, Japan. The predecessor of the school, founded in 1906, was chartered as a women's junior college in 1966. In 1987 it became coeducational.
