= Kamiura, Ehime =

Dissolved municipality in Ehime prefecture, Japan

Kamiura (上浦町, Kamiura-chō) was a town located in Ochi District, Ehime Prefecture, Japan.

As of 2003, the town had an estimated population of 3,517 and a density of 157.64 persons per km^{2}. The total area was 22.31 km^{2}.

On January 16, 2005, Kamiura, along with the towns of Hakata, Kikuma, Miyakubo, Namikata, Ōmishima, Ōnishi, Tamagawa and Yoshiumi, and the villages of Asakura and Sekizen (all from Ochi District), was merged into the expanded city of Imabari and no longer exists as an independent municipality.
