= Sekizen, Ehime =

Dissolved municipality in Ehime prefecture, Japan

Sekizen (関前村, Sekizen-mura) was a village located in Ochi District, Ehime Prefecture, Japan.

As of 2003, the village had an estimated population of 763 and a density of 138.22 persons per km^{2}. The total area was 5.52 km^{2}.

On January 16, 2005, Sekizen, along with the towns of Hakata, Kamiura, Kikuma, Miyakubo, Namikata, Ōmishima, Ōnishi, Tamagawa and Yoshiumi, and the village of Asakura (all from Ochi District), was merged into the expanded city of Imabari and no longer exists as an independent municipality.
