= Ōmishima, Ehime =

Ōmishima 大三島町
- Town
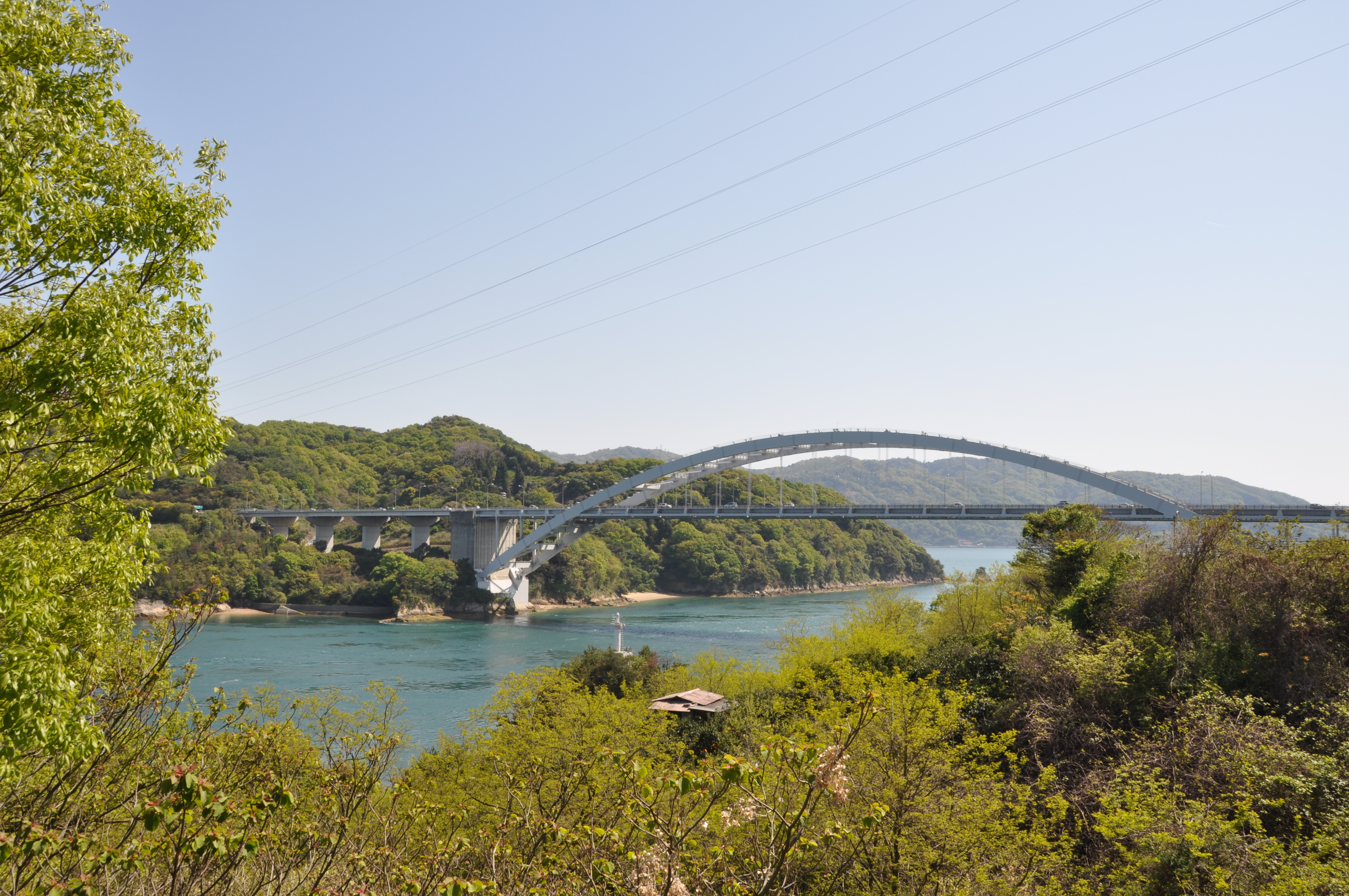
- Ōmishima Bridge, leading to Hakata
- Interactive map of Ōmishima
- Country: Japan
- Prefecture: Ehime
- District: Ochi
- Merged: January 16, 2005 (now part of Imabari)

Area
  - Total: 43.33 km^{2} (16.73 sq mi)

Population (2003)
  - Total: 4,006
  - Density: 92.45/km^{2} (239.4/sq mi)
- Time zone: UTC+09:00 (JST)
- Climate: Cfa

Ōmishima (大三島町, Ōmishima-chō) was a town located in Ōmishima Island, Ochi District, Ehime Prefecture, Japan.

As of 2003, the town had an estimated population of 4,006 and a density of 92.45 persons per km^{2}. The total area was 43.33 km^{2}.

On January 16, 2005, Ōmishima, along with the towns of Hakata, Kamiura, Kikuma, Miyakubo, Namikata, Ōnishi, Tamagawa and Yoshiumi, and the villages of Asakura and Sekizen (all from Ochi District), was merged into the expanded city of Imabari and no longer exists as an independent municipality.

The island is the home of Ōyamazumi Shrine.

== Climate ==
Climate data for Ōmishima (1991−2020 normals, extremes 1978−present)
Month	Jan	Feb	Mar	Apr	May	Jun	Jul	Aug	Sep	Oct	Nov	Dec	Year
Record high °C (°F)	16.0 (60.8)	20.2 (68.4)	25.4 (77.7)	27.9 (82.2)	30.4 (86.7)	33.7 (92.7)	38.0 (100.4)	37.4 (99.3)	36.1 (97.0)	31.9 (89.4)	24.1 (75.4)	20.4 (68.7)	38.0 (100.4)
Mean daily maximum °C (°F)	9.6 (49.3)	10.2 (50.4)	13.4 (56.1)	18.6 (65.5)	23.2 (73.8)	26.1 (79.0)	30.0 (86.0)	32.0 (89.6)	28.3 (82.9)	22.8 (73.0)	17.2 (63.0)	12.0 (53.6)	20.3 (68.5)
Daily mean °C (°F)	5.5 (41.9)	5.6 (42.1)	8.4 (47.1)	13.1 (55.6)	17.6 (63.7)	21.3 (70.3)	25.3 (77.5)	26.8 (80.2)	23.4 (74.1)	18.0 (64.4)	12.5 (54.5)	7.7 (45.9)	15.4 (59.8)
Mean daily minimum °C (°F)	1.3 (34.3)	1.1 (34.0)	3.4 (38.1)	8.0 (46.4)	12.7 (54.9)	17.6 (63.7)	22.0 (71.6)	23.2 (73.8)	19.7 (67.5)	13.8 (56.8)	8.2 (46.8)	3.4 (38.1)	11.2 (52.2)
Record low °C (°F)	−5.9 (21.4)	−6.2 (20.8)	−4.4 (24.1)	−1.5 (29.3)	3.6 (38.5)	9.6 (49.3)	15.5 (59.9)	15.6 (60.1)	11.1 (52.0)	5.5 (41.9)	−1.3 (29.7)	−3.5 (25.7)	−6.2 (20.8)
Average precipitation mm (inches)	40.8 (1.61)	54.0 (2.13)	89.5 (3.52)	98.0 (3.86)	116.2 (4.57)	186.3 (7.33)	194.6 (7.66)	93.5 (3.68)	133.4 (5.25)	96.3 (3.79)	66.0 (2.60)	50.1 (1.97)	1,218.6 (47.98)
Average precipitation days (≥ 1.0 mm)	5.3	6.7	9.0	8.9	8.7	11.1	9.4	6.7	8.8	7.3	6.4	6.0	94.3
Mean monthly sunshine hours	146.1	151.2	182.0	200.2	214.7	157.1	201.2	233.9	171.2	180.4	159.2	144.3	2,141.6
Source: JMA
