= Miyakubo, Ehime =

Dissolved municipality in Ehime prefecture, Japan

Miyakubo (宮窪町, Miyakubo-chō) was a town located in Ochi District, Ehime Prefecture, Japan.

As of 2003, the town had an estimated population of 3,522 and a density of 191.52 persons per km^{2}. The total area was 18.39 km^{2}.

On January 16, 2005, Miyakubo, along with the towns of Hakata, Kamiura, Kikuma, Namikata, Ōmishima, Ōnishi, Tamagawa and Yoshiumi, and the villages of Asakura and Sekizen (all from Ochi District), was merged into the expanded city of Imabari and no longer exists as an independent municipality.
