= Asakura, Ehime =

Dissolved municipality in Ehime prefecture, Japan

Asakura (朝倉村, Asakura-mura) was a village located in Ochi District, Ehime Prefecture, Japan.

As of 2003, the village had an estimated population of 4,994 and a density of 159.71 persons per km^{2}. The total area was 31.27 km^{2}.

On January 16, 2005, Asakura, along with the towns of Hakata, Kamiura, Kikuma, Miyakubo, Namikata, Ōmishima, Ōnishi, Tamagawa and Yoshiumi, and the village of Sekizen (all from Ochi District), was merged into the expanded city of Imabari and no longer exists as an independent municipality.
