= Yoshiumi, Ehime =

Dissolved municipality in Ehime prefecture, Japan

Yoshiumi (吉海町, Yoshiumi-chō) was a town located in Ochi District, Ehime Prefecture, Japan.

As of 2003, the town had an estimated population of 4,558 and a density of 164.43 persons per km^{2}. The total area was 27.72 km^{2}.

On January 16, 2005, Yoshiumi, along with the towns of Hakata, Kamiura, Kikuma, Miyakubo, Namikata, Ōmishima, Ōnishi and Tamagawa, and the villages of Asakura and Sekizen (all from Ochi District), was merged into the expanded city of Imabari and no longer exists as an independent municipality.
