= Hakata, Ehime =

Dissolved municipality in Ochi district, Ehime prefecture, Japan

Hakata (伯方町, Hakata-chō) was a town located in Ochi District, Ehime Prefecture, Japan.

As of 2003, the town had an estimated population of 7,683 and a density of 368.31 persons per km^{2}. The total area was 20.86 km^{2}.

On January 16, 2005, Hakata, along with the towns of Kamiura, Kikuma, Miyakubo, Namikata, Ōmishima, Ōnishi, Tamagawa and Yoshiumi, and the villages of Asakura and Sekizen (all from Ochi District), was merged into the expanded city of Imabari and no longer exists as an independent municipality.

== Location ==
Hakata was located on one of the islands of the Geiyo archipelago in the Seto Inland Sea, northeast of Imabari. 34°12′16″N 133°6′42″E
