= Kurushima =

Japanese island

Native name: 来島
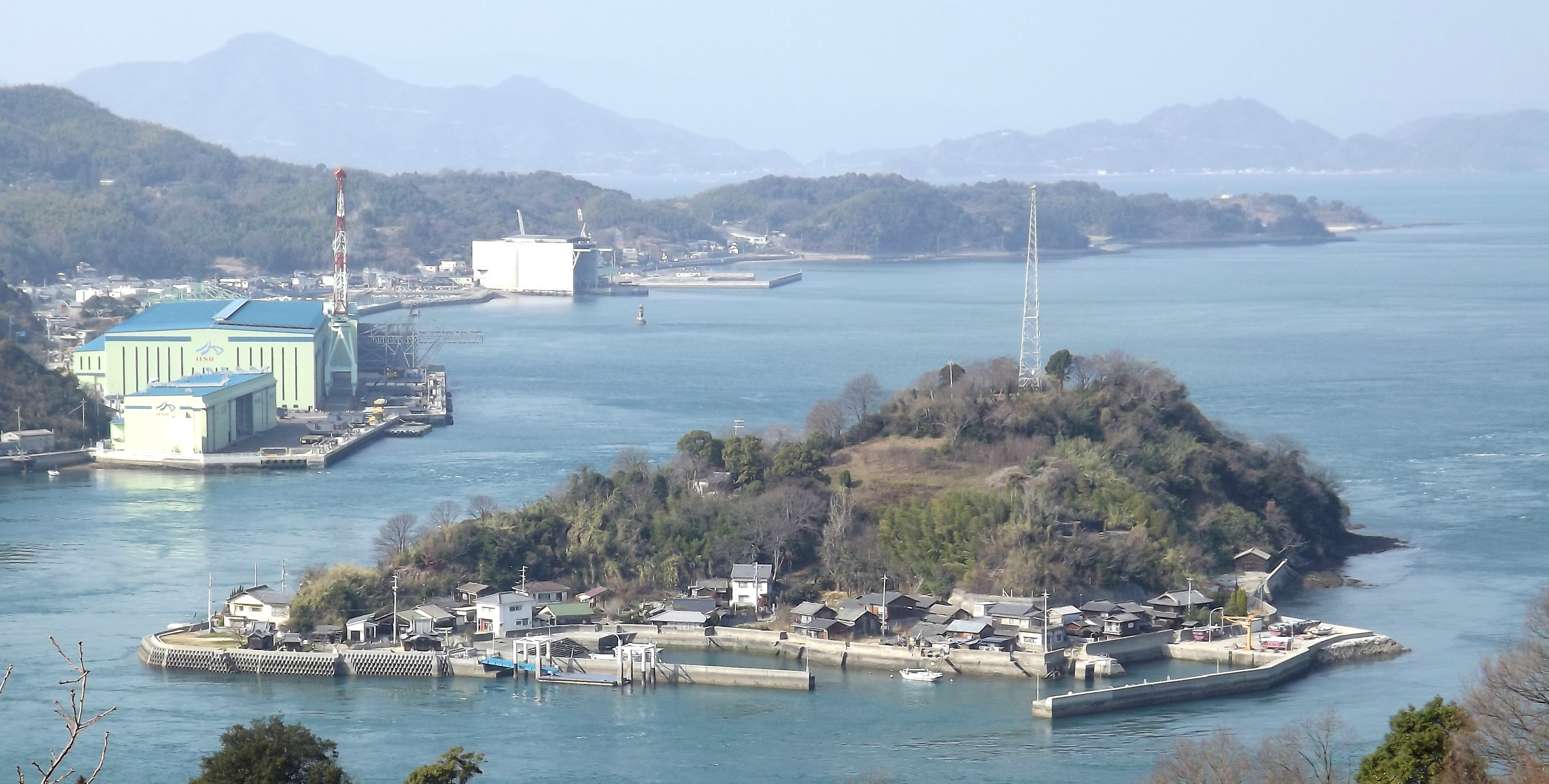

- Location within Ehime Prefecture Location within Japan

Geography
- Location: Seto Inland Sea, Japan
- Coordinates: 34°07′04″N 132°58′10″E
- Archipelago: Japanese archipelago
- Area: 0.04 km^{2} (0.015 sq mi)
- Coastline: 1 km (0.6 mi)
- Highest elevation: 45 m (148 ft)

Administration
- Japan
- Prefecture: Ehime Prefecture
- City: Imabari

Demographics
- Population: 32 (2009)

Kurushima (来島) is a Japanese island in the Inland Sea. Administratively, it forms part of the city of Imabari, Ehime Prefecture.

== Geography ==
Kurushima is situated some 240 metres (790 ft) off the coast of Shikoku's Takanawa Peninsula at the entrance to Hashihama Port (波止浜港) in Imabari. The island has a coastline of approximately 1 kilometre (0.62 mi) and a surface area of 0.44 square kilometres (0.17 sq mi). It is a natural fortress with cliffs to the north shaped by the fast currents (some 8 knots (15 km/h; 9.2 mph) to 10 knots (19 km/h; 12 mph)) and rocks below; there is a settlement on the flatter land to the south, around a small bay. To the east, the Kurushima Straits (来島海峡) are spanned by the Kurushima Kaikyō Bridge, while the island is protected as part of Setonaikai National Park.

== History ==
During the Sengoku period, the island was the base of the Kurushima Murakami, one of the three main houses of the Murakami kaizoku (the others the Noshima Murakami and Innoshima Murakami). There are still remains of the walls of Kurushima Castle (来島城), an element of Japan Heritage "Story" #036, as well as traces of residences and wells. In the Edo period, together with nearby Oshima (小島), the island was part of Kurushima Village (来島村) in Matsuyama Domain, with an assessment of twenty-six koku, three to, and nine shō. Around the end of the Kyōhō era in the early eighteenth century there were some seventy-eight households, fifty-three of them of fishermen. By Shōwa 53 (1978) this number had dropped to thirty-nine households, primarily making a living by commuting to the local shipyards and line fishing. As of 2009, Kurushima had thirty-two residents.

== Related maps ==
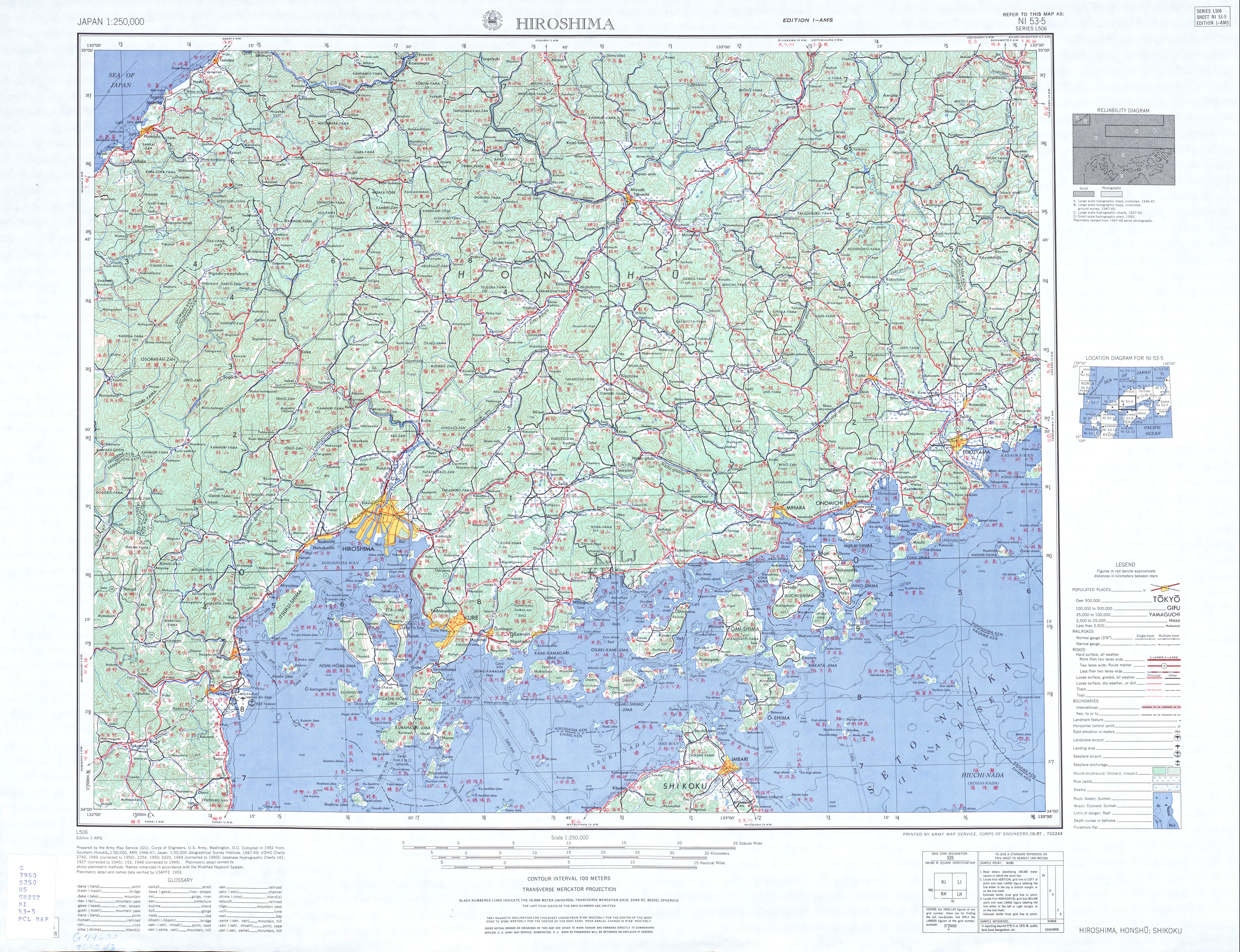
1953 US AMS map showing Hiroshima Prefecture and, across the sea to the south, Imabari in Ehime Prefecture; Kurushima is the small unmarked island near the bottom, to the right of the tip of what is marked Shikoku, just above Hashihama and to the southwest of "O-shima" ("Ko-jima" on the next map)

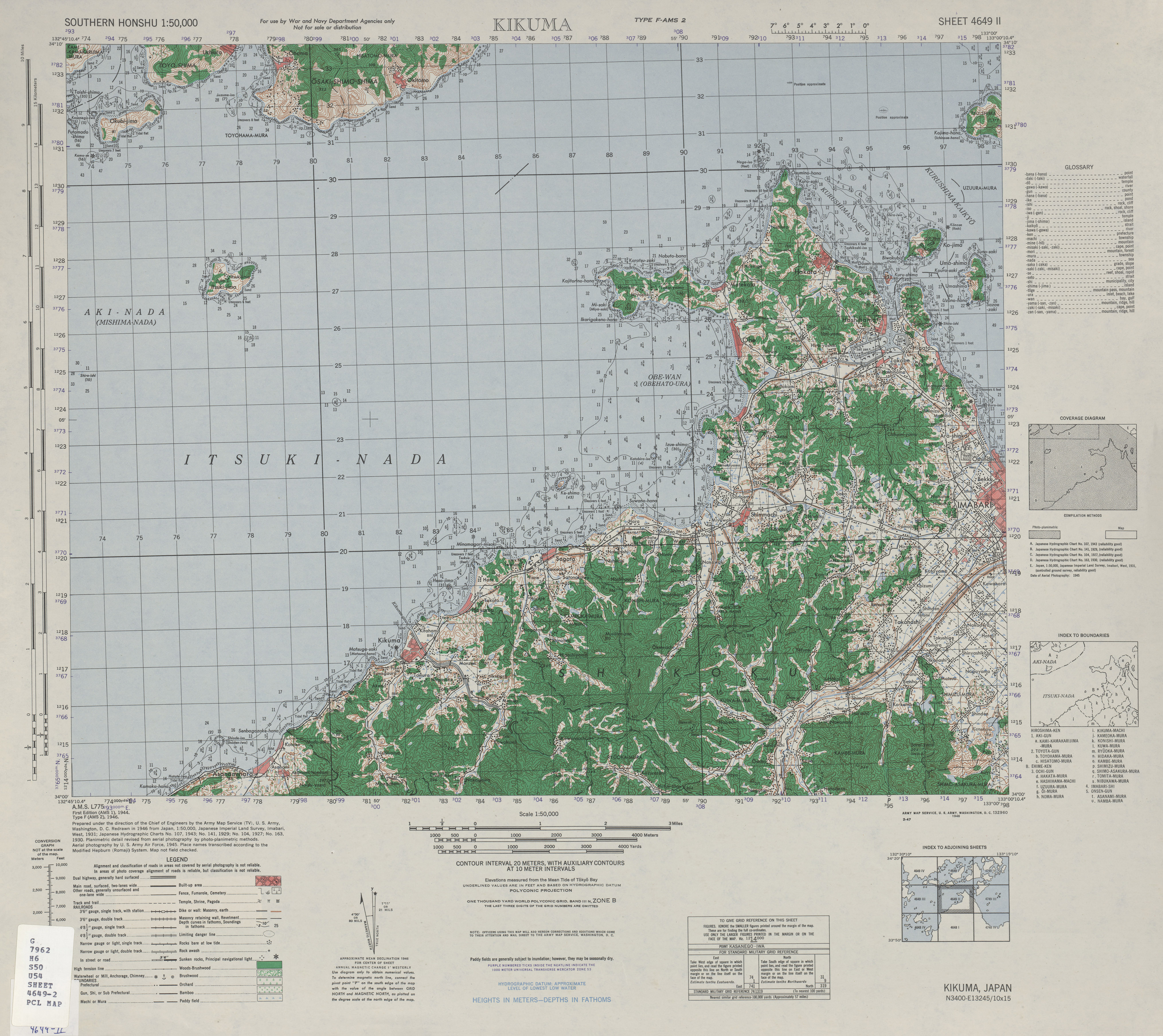
1946 US AMS map showing "Kuru-shima", to the southwest of "Ko-jima" ("O-shima" on the previous map)

== See also ==
- Setonaikai National Park
- Noshima
- Innoshima
