= Kikuma, Ehime =

Town in Ochi, Ehime, Japan

Kikuma (菊間町, Kikuma-chō) was a town located in Ochi District, Ehime Prefecture, Japan.

As of 2003, the town had an estimated population of 7,342 and a density of 198.59 per km^{2}. The total area was 36.97 km^{2}.

On January 16, 2005, Kikuma, along with the towns of Hakata, Kamiura, Miyakubo, Namikata, Ōmishima, Ōnishi, Tamagawa and Yoshiumi, and the villages of Asakura and Sekizen (all from Ochi District), was merged into the expanded city of Imabari and no longer exists as an independent municipality.
