= Tamagawa, Ehime =

Dissolved municipality in Ehime prefecture, Japan

Tamagawa (玉川町, Tamagawa-chō) was a town located in Ochi District, Ehime Prefecture, Japan.

As of 2003, the town had an estimated population of 5,994 and a density of 57.69 persons per km^{2}. The total area was 103.90 km^{2}.

On January 16, 2005, Sekizen, along with the towns of Hakata, Kamiura, Kikuma, Miyakubo, Namikata, Ōmishima, Ōnishi and Yoshiumi, and the villages of Asakura and Sekizen (all from Ochi District), was merged into the expanded city of Imabari and no longer exists as an independent municipality.
