= Murakami Takeyoshi =

Japanese samurai (1533–1604)

- 村上 武吉
- Born: 1533; Noshima Castle?
- Died: September 15, 1604 (aged 70–71); Ōshima District, Yamaguchi
- Military career
- Allegiance: Mōri clan
- Rank: Fleet Commander
- Commands: Murakami clan
- Conflicts: Battle of Miyajima (1555); Siege of Moji (1561); Battles of Kizugawaguchi (1578)

Murakami Takeyoshi (村上武吉; 1533 – 1604) was a Japanese samurai, pirate leader and naval commander of the Mōri clan in the Sengoku period. He was the head of the Noshima Murakami pirates.

In 1555, the Noshima Murakami aided the Mōri clan and played an important role during the Battle of Miyajima.

In 1561, Takeyoshi fought at the Siege of Moji against the combined navy of the Ōtomo clan and Portuguese traders under Ōtomo Sōrin.

In 1576, during the Ishiyama Hongan-ji War, Takeyoshi's eldest son, Motoyoshi, led the Murakami navy to defeat Oda Nobunaga`s navy led by Kuki Yoshitaka in the first battle of Kizugawaguchi.

In 1578, Takeyoshi was defeated by the Oda clan's navy led by Kuki in the second battle of Kizugawaguchi, due to Kuki's use of Tekkōsen, newly developed warships with iron cladding to repel arrows and bullets.

== See also ==
- Kuki Yoshitaka
- Ohama Kagetaka
