= Ōshima (Ehime) =

Island in Ehime, Japan

Native name: 大島
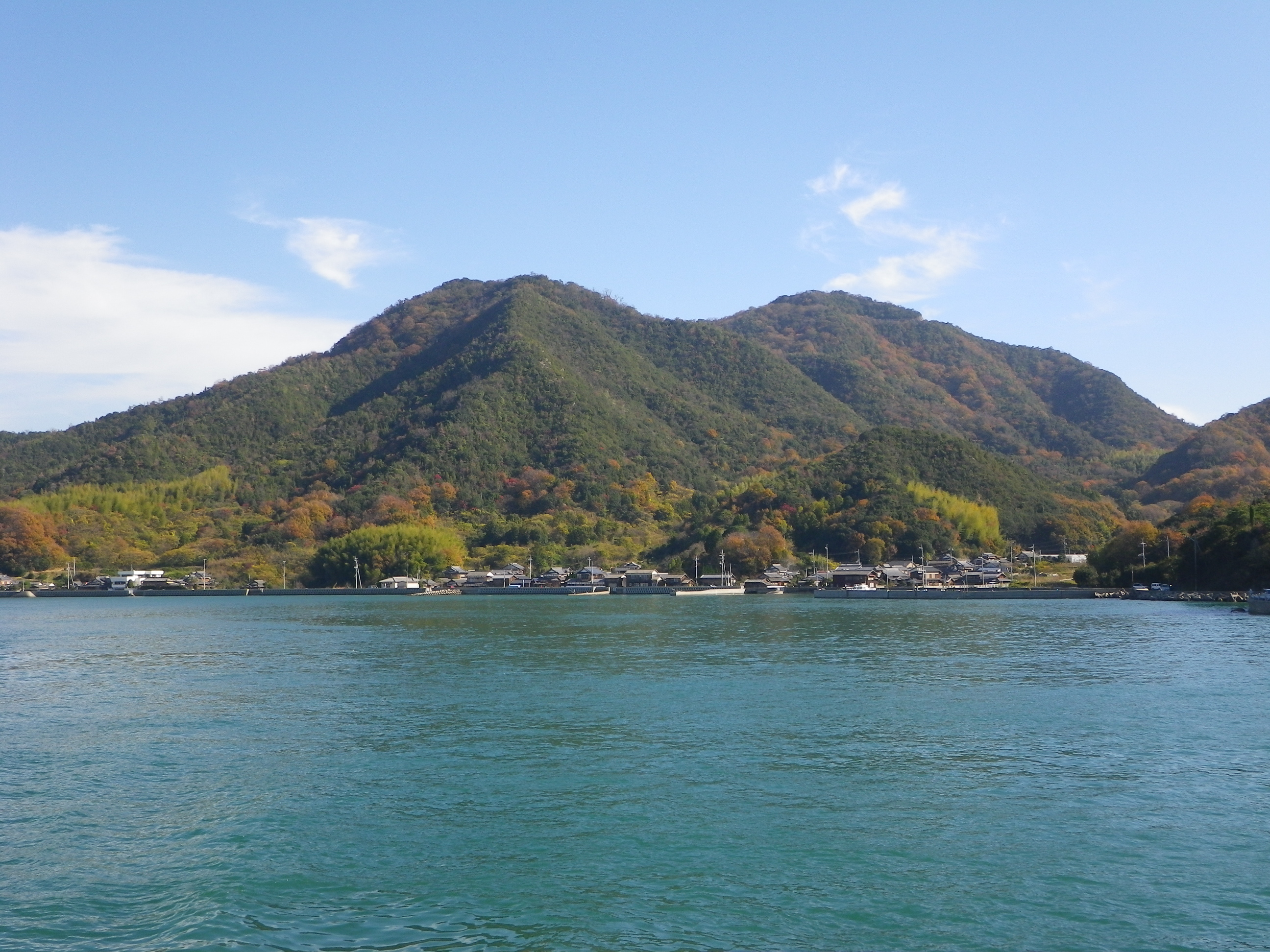
- Mount Kirō on Ōshima

- Location within Ehime Prefecture Location within Japan

Geography
- Location: Seto Inland Sea
- Coordinates: 34°9′10″N 133°3′30″E
- Archipelago: Geiyo Islands
- Area: 41.90 km^{2} (16.18 sq mi)
- Highest elevation: 381.9 m (1253 ft)
- Highest point: Mount Kirō

Administration
- Japan
- Prefecture: Ehime
- City: Imabari

Demographics
- Population: 6031 (2015)

Additional information

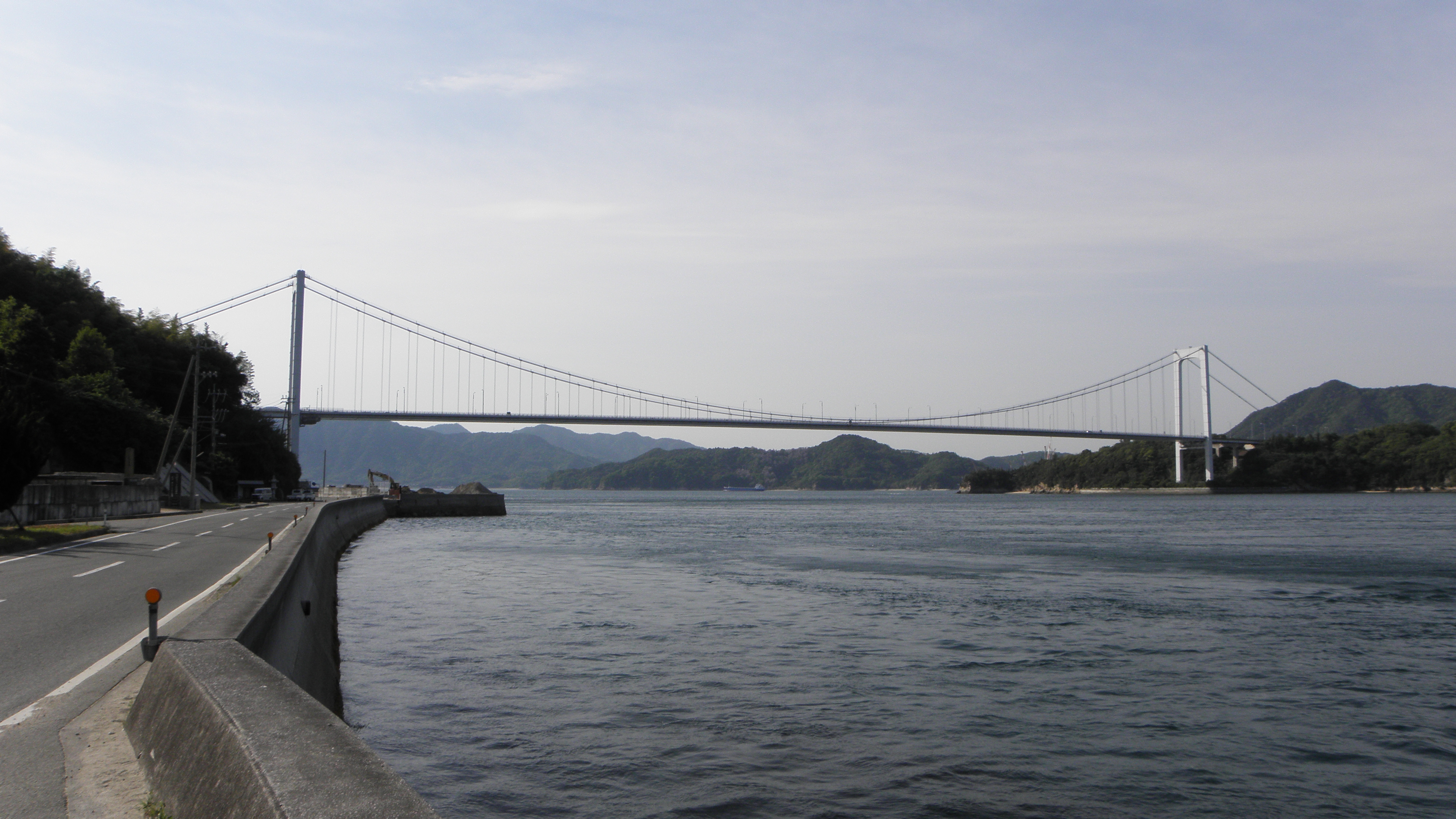
Hakata-Oshima Suspension Bridge taken from Oshima.

Ōshima (大島) is an inhabited island in the Geiyo Islands in the Seto Inland Sea of Japan, lying between the larger islands of Honshū and Shikoku.

== Overview ==
Ōshima is located in the north of Ehime prefecture, and has an area of 41.89 square kilometres (16.17 sq mi). Administratively, it was formerly divided between the towns of Yoshiumi and Miyakubo of Ochi District, Ehime; however, in January 16, 2005 both towns were absorbed into the city of Imabari. The highest elevation on the island is Mount Kirō, at 381.9 metres (1,253 ft). Compared to other islands in the Geiyo Archipelago, the island has many flat areas, which has permitted the development of rice paddy fields. Other economic activities have traditionally included the cultivation of citrus fruits, mainly mikan, a small shipyard and stone quarries. The island is on the Shimanami Kaidō, an expressway between Honshū and Shikoku, and is linked to Hatakajima by the Hakata-Ōshima Bridge and Kurushima by the Kurushima-Kaikyō Bridge. The expressway has placed the island within commuting distance of Imabari.
