= Battles of Kizugawaguchi =

1576 and 1578 Japanese naval battles

The two Battles of Kizugawaguchi (木津川口の戦い, Kizugawaguchi no Tatakai) were fought during Oda Nobunaga's attempted sieges of the Ishiyama Hongan-ji in Osaka. The Hongan-ji was the primary fortress of the Ikkō-ikki, mobs of warrior monks, priests, and farmers who opposed Oda's rule. He ordered one of his admirals, Kuki Yoshitaka, to organize a blockade against the fleets of the Ikki's allies, who sought to supply the fortress and break the siege. Many of the ruling families of the neighboring provinces opposed Oda, chief among them Mōri Terumoto of the Mōri clan.

== First battle (1576) ==
First Battle of Kizugawaguchi
- Part of the Sengoku period
Date	August 1576
Location	Kizugawaguchi, off the coast of Osaka 34°37′52″N 135°25′44″E
Result	Mōri victory

Belligerents
Forces of Oda Nobunaga	Forces of Mōri Terumoto

Commanders and leaders
Kuki Yoshitaka	Murakami Motoyoshi

Strength
~300 vessels	~700 vessels
- Location within Japan

In the first battle, in 1576, the Mōri navy led by Motoyoshi, son of Murakami Takeyoshi, defeated Kuki Yoshitaka's fleet, breaking the blockade and supplying the fortress.

The Mōri navy departed Iwaya on Awaji Island on July 12, crossed over to Kaizuka in Senshu, and, after agreeing with the Saiga sect of Kishu, proceeded from Sakaitsu to the mouth of the Kizu River on the 13th. There, they encountered the Oda navy, consisting of several large ships with built-up wells and over 200 guard ships, and a battle ensued. The battle took place from the 13th to the early morning of the 14th, and the Mōri navy defeated the Oda forces, burning down all of the large ships. On July 15 (according to the Shinchō Koki), when the Mōri navy attempted to deliver military supplies to Ishiyama Hongan-ji Temple, the Oda navy attempted to intercept them at the mouth of the Kizu River, but their ships were set on fire with Bō-hiya incendiary weapons.

Since their entrance to Kyoto in 1568, the army of Oda Nobunaga had always been successful when besieging an enemy's defensive position. This battle was a rare instance in which a large enemy force managed to break through the Oda forces' blockade from the outside.

== Second battle (1578) ==
Second Battle of Kizugawaguchi
- Part of the Sengoku period
Date	1578
Location	Kizugawaguchi, off the coast of Osaka
Result	Disputed; Oda navy failed to blockade the supply line for the Hongan-ji forces

Belligerents
Forces of Oda Nobunaga	Forces of Mōri Terumoto

Commanders and leaders
Kuki Yoshitaka; Takigawa Kazumasu	Murakami Takeyoshi

Strength
6 atakebune	600 vessels

In 1578 around June, Kuki Yoshitaka built six Atakebune ships equipped with large guns and three cannons at the bay of Ise. (Note: As per Shinchō Kōki. 21st century Japanese historians suggests Atakebune was an early form of Ironclad warship.) The Ishiyama Hongan-ji was still under siege, and Oda's fleet with Takigawa Kazumasu commanded a white ship to accompany the six Atakebune ships.

Several Mōri vessels under Murakami Takeyoshi were burned and sunk, and Oda's fleet ultimately achieved victory. According to the Shinchō Kōki, the supply lines were broken, and the Hongan-Ji fell soon afterward. However, the Mōri discovered an existing flaw in the Tekkōsen design during this battle. As Mōri samurai rushed to board the large ship, all the defending warriors ran to that side of the deck to defend themselves, and the vessel capsized as its center of gravity shifted.

However, primary sources from the Mōri clan record stated that the ships of the Mōri naval forces managed to reach Kizuura and, after consulting with Shimotsuma Yorikane, prepared for a protracted battle with the addition of Araki Murashige, who had just defected from the Oda. Historian Ogawa Yu observed the letters sent by the Hongan-ji to the Mōri, the establishment of a base for the Mōri navy in Kizu, and that Kuki Yoshitaka was short of provisions and received temporary supplies from Sakai. This suggests that the Kuki clan's transport from their base was being hindered by anti-Nobunaga forces such as the Saiga clan and Horiuchi Ujiyoshi, and that maritime supplies to Hongan-ji continued, preventing a complete blockade. Thus, the Oda forces had actually failed in their primary objective to cut off supplies to Hongan-ji.

Ogawa Yu stated that this battle was not decisive. It was only in the following year that the supply for the anti-Nobunaga alliance could be stopped, due to Ukita Naoie's defection to the Oda clan, and the anti-Nobunaga forces such as Bessho Nagaharu and Araki Murashige were driven out. This made the transportation work of the navy difficult, placing a great burden on them. Furthermore, Kodama Narihide, who was stationed on Awaji Island, retreated without permission due to the risk of being isolated from his base.
