= Noshima Murakami =

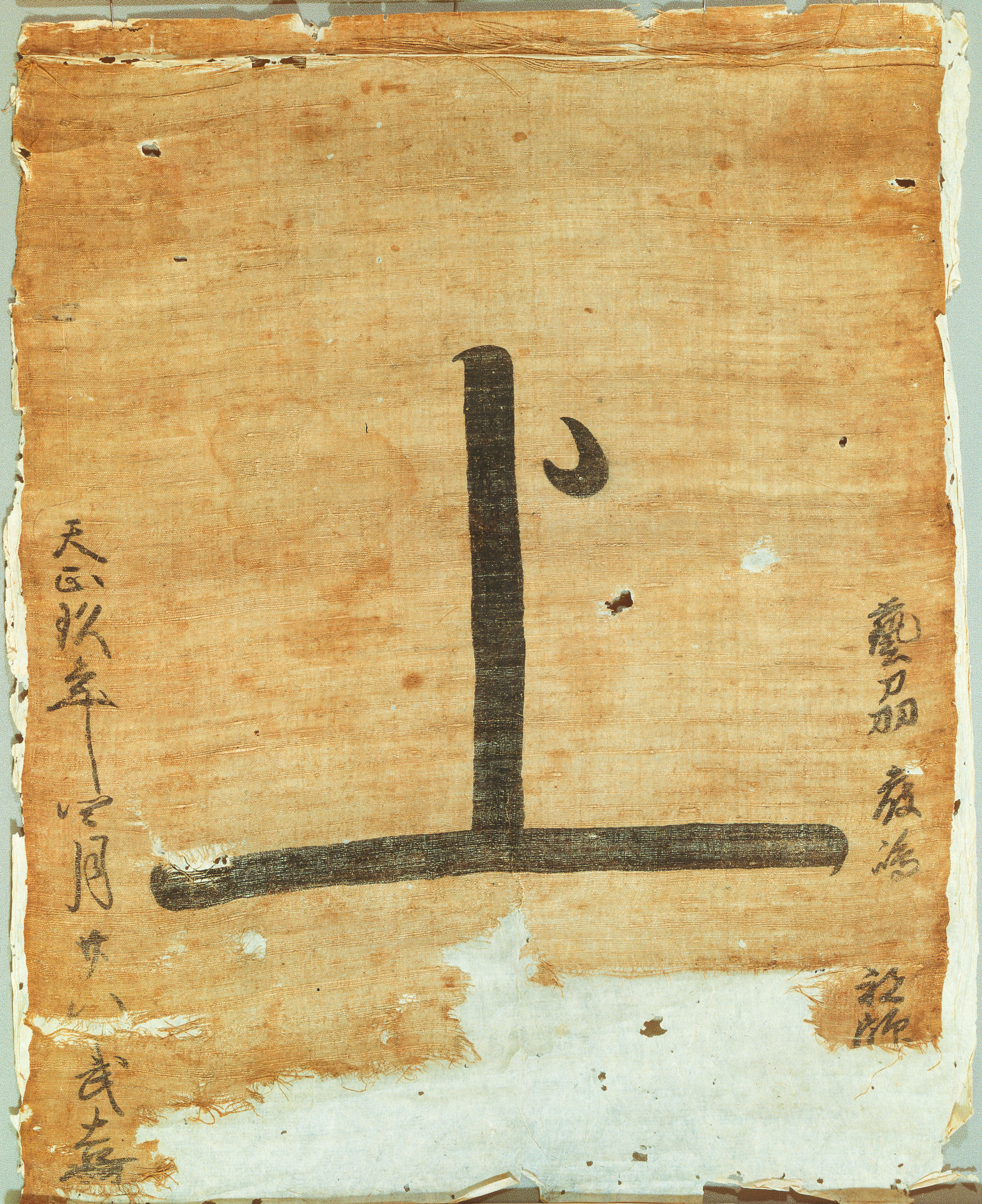

The Noshima Murakami were a Japanese family, involved in seafaring and piracy during the 16th century. The family was based on Noshima, a small island off the coast of Shikoku in the Seto Inland Sea.

== Ōuchi clan ==
In 1532, the Noshima began working for the Ōtomo clan and the Kōno family, who were fighting against Ōuchi Yoshitaka. They attacked Ōuchi sea lords in the Kamagari Islands. In the summer of 1541, Ōuchi's Shirai sea lords led an attack against the Noshima, Kurushima, and Innoshima, reaching a standstill in the winter months. The next year, the Noshima began to conduct cargo inspections at Itsukushima under a contract with Ōuchi Yoshitaka. This led the Kōno family to stop their patronage. Merchants from Sakai brought a suit against them alleging an infringement of their rights to levy duties. A countersuit was brought by the Noshima, and the merchants acknowledged their toll rights on all ships apart from those coming from south Kyushu.

In the 1540s, a minor branch of the family based on the nearby Nakatoshima island launched a challenge over house leadership. Ōuchi sponsorship and assistance from the Shirai allowed the main branch to subdue them easily.

== Oda clan ==
In 1576, the Noshima helped break the Oda clan blockade and deliver provisions to Osaka's Ikkō-ikki citadel. They proceeded to capture a castle near Utazu, which allowed them to control the harbour. From 1579 until 1582, they worked for the Mori clan to block the Inland Sea from any of Oda Nobunaga's ships. However, they later entered into negotiations with the Oda, sending Nobunaga a baby hawk, which was a symbol of loyal service.

== Traveler assistance ==
In the 1520s, the Hosokawa recognized Noshima control over Shiwaku, where they developed it into a way station for travellers and sailors. The Nosima were generous in the travel passes that they gave, bestowing them to Matsura lords from Hirado Domain, harbour officials from Akamagaseki, shipping organizations from Kii Province, and traveling Jesuits. In 1586, Portuguese missionary Luís Fróis, expressed his fear of travelling through the Inland Sea without flying the Noshima flag. The Noshima leader at the time was Murakami Takeyoshi, and flying their flag was often seen as the only way to ensure safety at sea.

The Noshima created a maritime toll road using ships: the protection against interlopers and rival companies possibly persuaded merchants to remain within the boundaries.
