= Imabari =

Imabari 今治市
- City
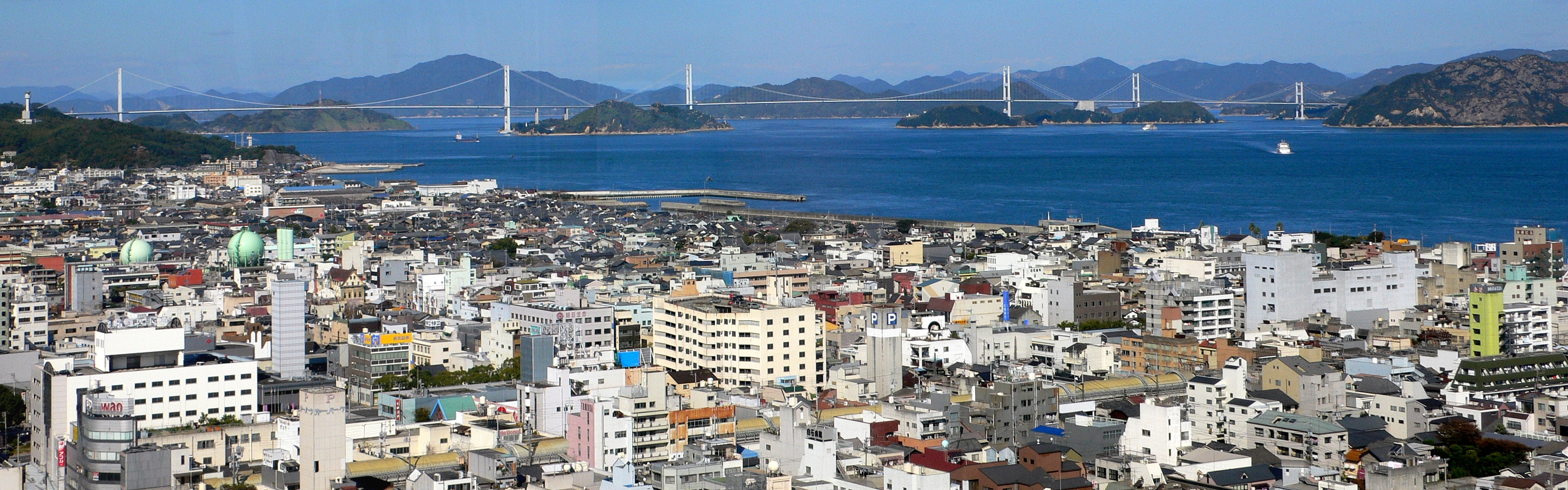
- View of Seto Inner Sea and downtown Imabari

- Flag Emblem
- Interactive map of Imabari
- Location in Japan
- Coordinates: 34°4′N 133°0′E
- Country: Japan
- Region: Shikoku
- Prefecture: Ehime Prefecture

Government
  - Mayor: Shigeki Tokunaga (since February 2021)

Area
  - Total: 419.14 km^{2} (161.83 sq mi)

Population (August 31, 2012)
  - Total: 152,111
  - Density: 362.91/km^{2} (939.94/sq mi)
- Time zone: UTC+09:00 (JST)
- City hall address: 1-4-1 Bekku-chō, Imabari-shi, Ehime-ken 794-8511
- Climate: Cfa
- Website: Official website
- Symbols
- Flower: Azalea
- Tree: Camphor laurel

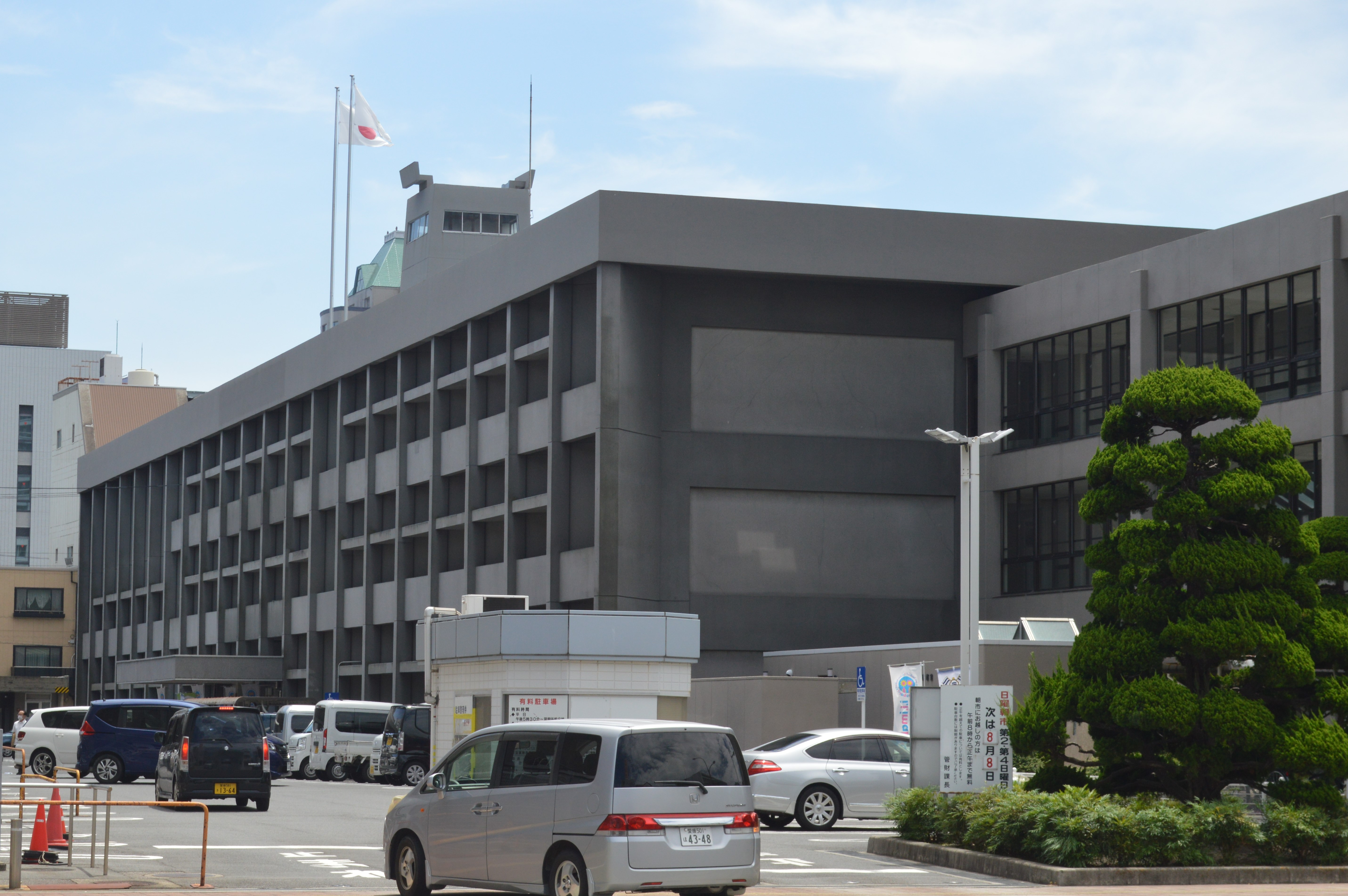
Imabari City Hall

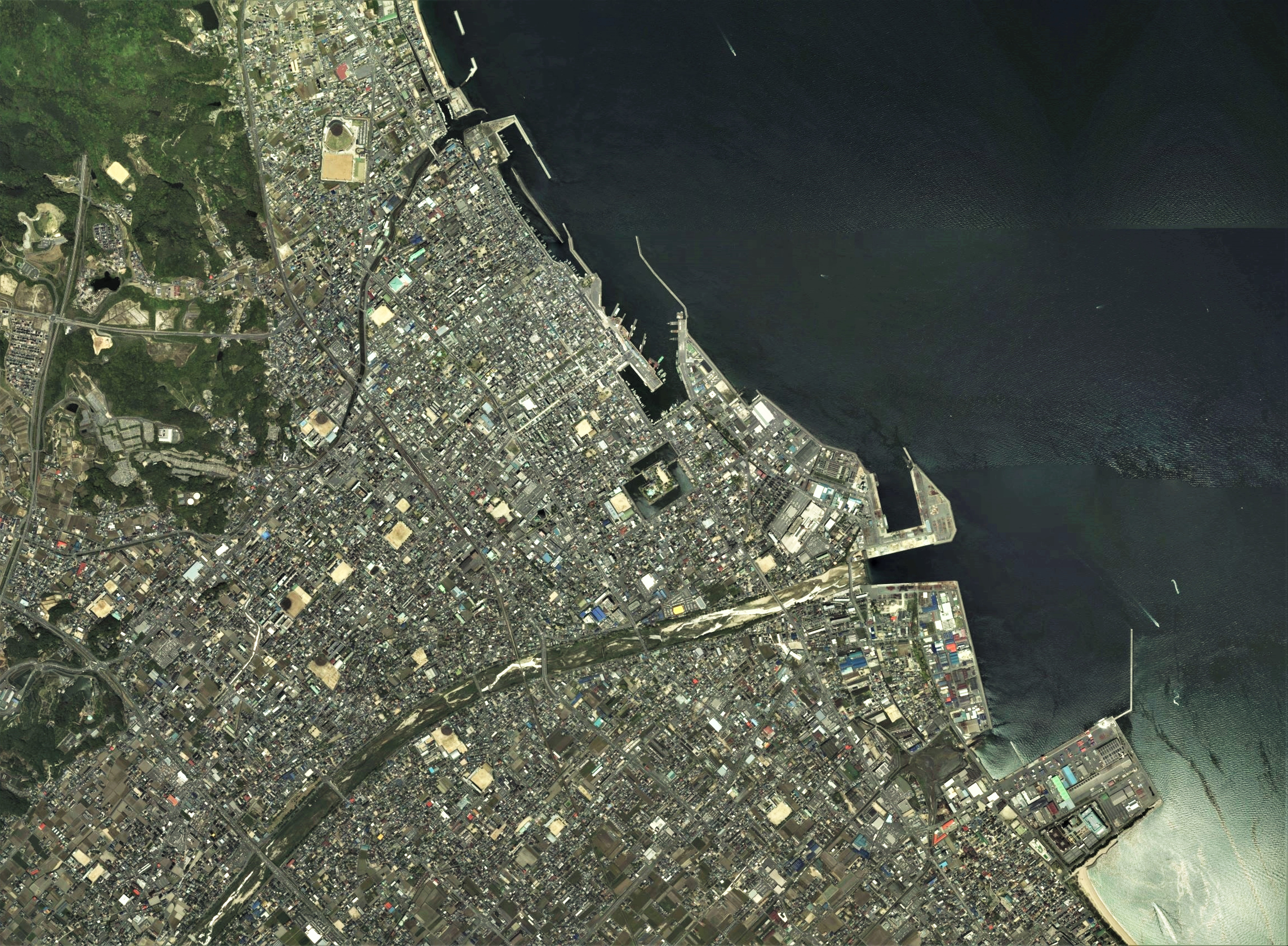
Aerial view of Imabari city center

Imabari (今治市, Imabari-shi; Japanese pronunciation: [ì.mä́.bä̀.ɾʲì, -bä́.ɾʲí.ɕì]) is a city in Ehime Prefecture, Japan. It is the second largest city in the prefecture. As of 31 August 2022, the city had an estimated population of 152,111 in 75,947 households and a population density of 360 persons per km². The total area of the city is 468.19 square kilometres (180.77 sq mi). The population is the second largest in Ehime Prefecture after Matsuyama City.

== Geography ==
Imabari is located in central Ehime Prefecture, facing the Seto Inland Sea to the east and northwest, and including a portion of the Geiyo Islands in between Shikoku and Honshu, including Ōmishima, Ōshima and Hakatajima. The land portion occupies the northeastern part of the Takanawa Peninsula. The highest elevation in the city is Mound Kirō on Ōshima Island at 307.8 meters.

=== Neighbouring municipalities ===
Ehime Prefecture

- Kamijima
- Matsuyama
- Saijō
- Tōon

=== Climate ===
Imabari has a humid subtropical climate (Köppen Cfa) characterized by warm summers and cool winters with light snowfall. The average annual temperature in Imabari is 15.4 °C. The average annual rainfall is 1740 mm with September as the wettest month. The temperatures are highest on average in August, at around 27.4 °C, and lowest in January, at around 5.9 °C.

Climate data for Imabari (1991−2020 normals, extremes 1976−present)
Month	Jan	Feb	Mar	Apr	May	Jun	Jul	Aug	Sep	Oct	Nov	Dec	Year
Record high °C (°F)	18.0 (64.4)	21.7 (71.1)	28.1 (82.6)	30.0 (86.0)	33.6 (92.5)	35.8 (96.4)	37.7 (99.9)	38.3 (100.9)	36.3 (97.3)	33.1 (91.6)	24.8 (76.6)	23.3 (73.9)	38.3 (100.9)
Mean daily maximum °C (°F)	9.8 (49.6)	10.3 (50.5)	13.6 (56.5)	18.8 (65.8)	23.6 (74.5)	26.4 (79.5)	30.7 (87.3)	32.2 (90.0)	28.2 (82.8)	22.9 (73.2)	17.3 (63.1)	12.2 (54.0)	20.5 (68.9)
Daily mean °C (°F)	5.9 (42.6)	6.1 (43.0)	9.0 (48.2)	13.7 (56.7)	18.4 (65.1)	22.0 (71.6)	26.2 (79.2)	27.4 (81.3)	24.0 (75.2)	18.6 (65.5)	13.0 (55.4)	8.1 (46.6)	16.0 (60.9)
Mean daily minimum °C (°F)	1.8 (35.2)	1.7 (35.1)	4.3 (39.7)	8.8 (47.8)	13.7 (56.7)	18.4 (65.1)	22.7 (72.9)	23.9 (75.0)	20.4 (68.7)	14.6 (58.3)	8.9 (48.0)	4.1 (39.4)	11.9 (53.5)
Record low °C (°F)	−3.8 (25.2)	−6.5 (20.3)	−3.7 (25.3)	−0.7 (30.7)	5.2 (41.4)	10.9 (51.6)	16.0 (60.8)	17.7 (63.9)	12.8 (55.0)	4.7 (40.5)	0.5 (32.9)	−3.2 (26.2)	−6.5 (20.3)
Average precipitation mm (inches)	49.6 (1.95)	59.8 (2.35)	96.6 (3.80)	97.0 (3.82)	111.8 (4.40)	196.2 (7.72)	191.8 (7.55)	93.8 (3.69)	165.2 (6.50)	122.2 (4.81)	69.6 (2.74)	59.4 (2.34)	1,325.5 (52.19)
Average precipitation days (≥ 1.0 mm)	6.7	7.2	9.7	9.3	8.6	11.0	9.3	6.7	9.5	7.5	7.1	7.2	99.8
Mean monthly sunshine hours	139.6	146.0	184.7	198.8	215.0	163.4	202.4	229.7	161.6	165.3	136.8	129.7	2,072.9
Source: JMA

== Demographics ==
Per Japanese census data, the population of Imabari has been declining since the 1980s.

Historical population
Year	Pop.	±%
1920	143,218	—
1930	155,568	+8.6%
1940	156,810	+0.8%
1950	198,109	+26.3%
1960	193,816	−2.2%
1970	189,918	−2.0%
1980	197,818	+4.2%
1990	191,504	−3.2%
2000	180,627	−5.7%
2010	166,532	−7.8%
2020	151,672	−8.9%

== History ==
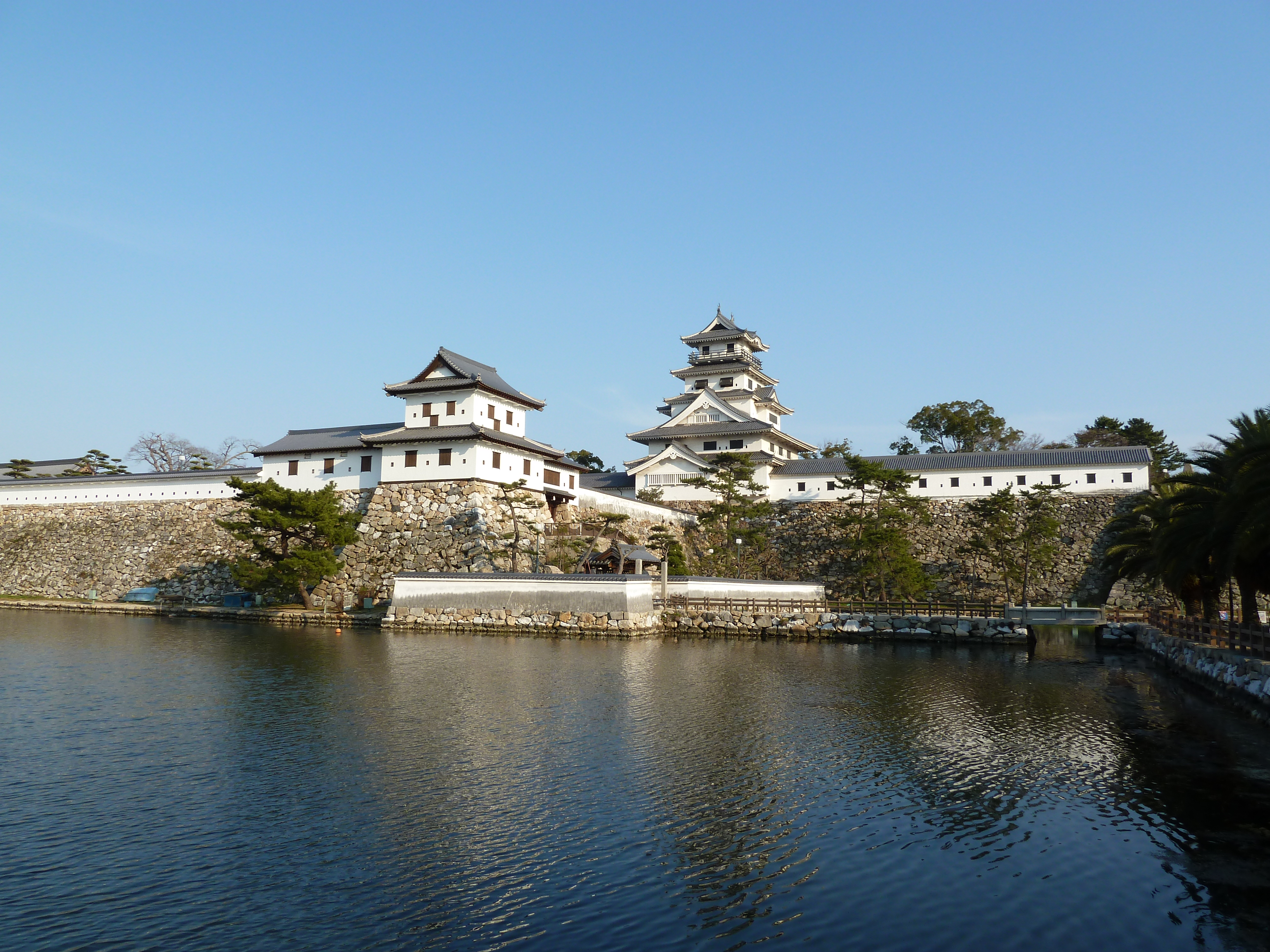
Imabari Castle

The area in which Imabari is situated is part of ancient Iyo Province and had long been a strategic point for the control of the Seto Inland Sea. In the Sengoku period it was dominated by the Murakami clan, a maritime clan who engaged in shipping or as pilots for vessels through the complex channels and rocky straits in between Shikoku and Honshu, but who also occasionally acted as pirates or as the mercenary naval force for a powerful warlord. After the Battle of Sekigahara, Tokugawa Ieyasu installed his general Tōdō Takatora as daimyō of the 200,000 koku Imabari Domain. Tōdō Takatora constructed Imabari Castle and the castle town which forms the core of the modern city. The domain was subsequently ruled by a cadet branch of the Hisamatsu-Matsudaira clan until the end of the Edo period. The town of Imabari was established on December 15, 1889, with the creation of the modern municipalities system. The town merged with the village of Hiyoshi on February 11, 1920, to become the city of Imabari. Industrialization progressed rapidly in the early 20th century, centered around the textile and shipbuilding industries. The city was bombed three times in the final months of World War II, with the first air raid on April 24, 1945, killing 68 civilians, the second on May 8 killing 29 (mostly students of Imabari Girls' High School) and the third and largest on August 5, during which 454 people died and 80% of the city center was destroyed. The city reconstructed rapidly in the post-war era.

On January 16, 2005, the towns of Hakata, Kamiura, Kikuma, Miyakubo, Namikata, Ōmishima, Ōnishi, Tamagawa, and Yoshiumi, and the villages of Asakura and Sekizen (all from Ochi District) were merged into Imabari. As a result, there are no more villages within Ehime Prefecture.

== Government ==
Imabari has a mayor-council form of government with a directly elected mayor and a unicameral city council of 28 members. Imabari, together with Kamijima, contributes six members to the Ehime Prefectural Assembly.

In terms of national politics, Imabari is part of Ehime 2nd district of the lower house of the Diet of Japan. Prior to 2022, the city was part of Ehime 3rd district.

== Economy ==
Imabari is home to a large number of shipbuilding and maritime servicing facilities along the northern and eastern coastlines of the city. Facilities include a small container port and maintenance and construction shipyards belonging to Imabari Shipbuilding, Japan's largest ship builder.

The port has also long been a trading center within Shikoku. The city is home to a large cotton processing industry, with particular emphasis on towels. The city produces around 60% of the towels made in Japan. As of 1998, there were over 200 towel production plants in the city. The city also specializes in the dyeing industry.

== Education ==
Imabari has 26 public elementary schools and 15 public middle schools operated by the city government and one private combined elementary/middle school. The city has six public high schools operated by the Ehime Prefectural Board of Education and five private high schools. The prefecture also operates one special education school for the handicapped. The Imabari Meitoku Junior College is located in the city, as is the Okayama University of Science Faculty of Veterinary Medicine.

== Transportation ==
=== Railways ===
Shikoku Railway Company - Yosan Line

- Iyo-Sakurai - Iyo-Tomita - Imabari - Hashihama - Namikata - Ōnishi - Iyo-Kameoka - Kikuma

=== Highways ===
The Kurushima-Kaikyō Bridge, a toll road suspension bridge and integrated expressway, connects Imabari and Shikoku across a series of islands in the Seto Inland Sea to Hiroshima Prefecture. Opened in 1999, the bridge is part of the Shimanami Kaidō, and features an expressway for road vehicles as well as dedicated pedestrian and cycle lanes.

- Imabari-Komatsu Expressway
- Nishiseto Expressway
- National Route 196
- National Route 317

=== Ports ===
- Port of Imabari

== Sister cities ==
Imabari is twinned with:

- Lakeland, Florida, United States, since July 6, 1995
- Panama City, Panama, since March 2, 1977

== Local attractions ==
- Imabari Castle, built in 1604. The castle is unusual in that seawater is used in its moat.
- Shikoku Pilgrimage temples #54 to #59: Emmei-ji, Nankō-bō, Taisan-ji, Eifuku-ji, Sen’yū-ji, and Iyo-Kokubun-ji.
- Toyo Ito Museum of Architecture, opened in 2011.

== Sports ==
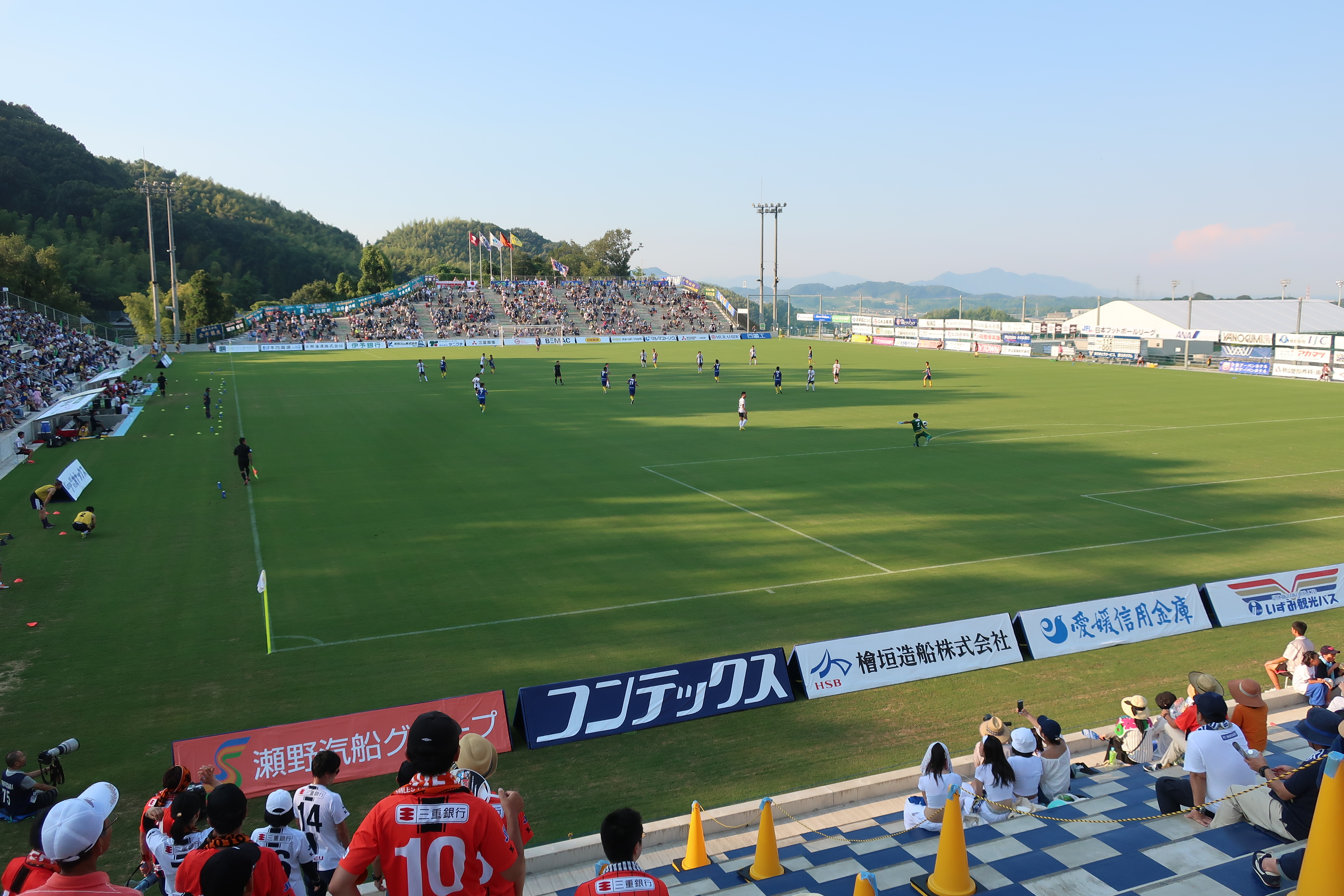
A view of Thanks Dream Stadium (Arigatou Yume Stadium), where home stadium of FC Imabari until 2022 and FC Imabari Lady's

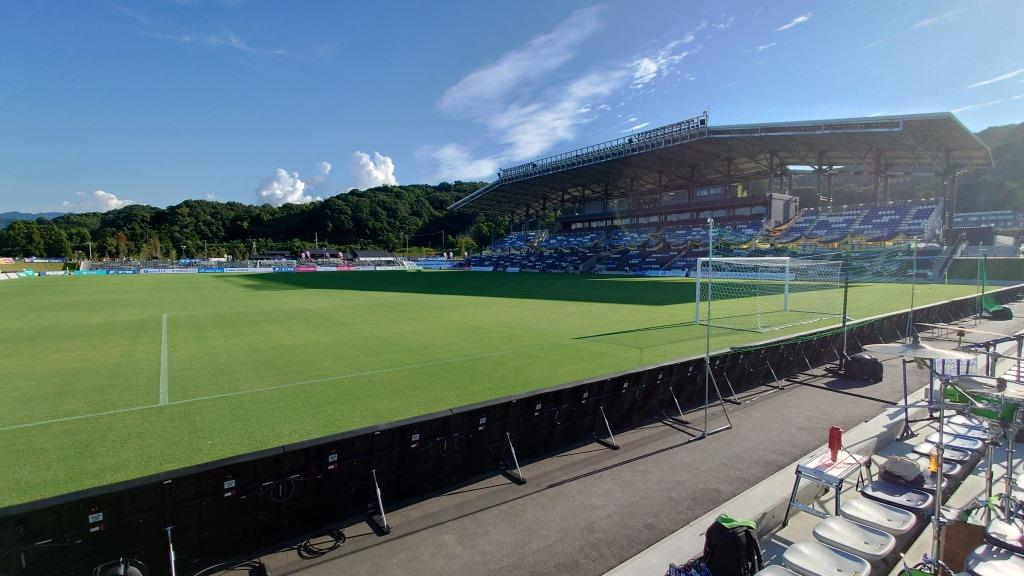
A view of ASICS Satoyama Stadium, where new home stadium of FC Imabari since 2023

FC Imabari, current men's association football league, J2 League, current home stadium at ASICS Satoyama Stadium.

FC Imabari Ladies, women's association football league, Nadeshiko League, home stadium at Thanks Dream Stadium. (Arigatou Yume Stadium)

== Notable people ==
- Noburu Katagami, literary critic.
- Kenji Nagai, grew up and went to high school in Imabari, he was a freelance journalist that was murdered in 2007 while he was filming during the Saffron Revolution, a popular uprising in Myanmar against the military dictatorship regime, his last film and camera was eventually recovered and given to his sister.
- Shikuichi Shigemi (1865–1928), novelist and academic, was born in Imabari. A teacher at Gakushuin and practiced as a medical physician in Tokyo. Wrote and published A Japanese Boy by Himself in 1889, while studying at Yale University.
- Kenzo Tange (1913–2005), noted modernist architect, born in Osaka, but spent much of his early school years in Imabari. Returned to design Imabari City Hall in 1958.
- Yuya Uemura (1994 - ), professional wrestler and former collegiate wrestler. New Japan Pro-Wrestling young lion.
