= Sanda Domain =

Japanese feudal domain located in Settsu Province

Sanda Domain 三田藩
- under the Tokugawa shogunate
- 1600–1871
- Capital: Sanda Castle
- Area
  - Coordinates: 34°53′12.781″N 135°13′16.104″E
- Government
  - Type: Daimyō
- Historical era: Edo period
  - Established: 1600
  - Disestablished: 1871
- Today part of: part of Hyōgo Prefecture

Location of Sanda Castle
Sanda Domain (Japan)

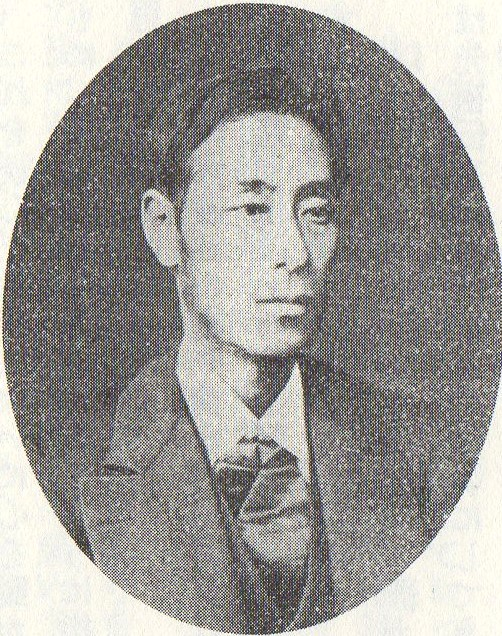
Kuki Michitaka, last daimyō of Sanda

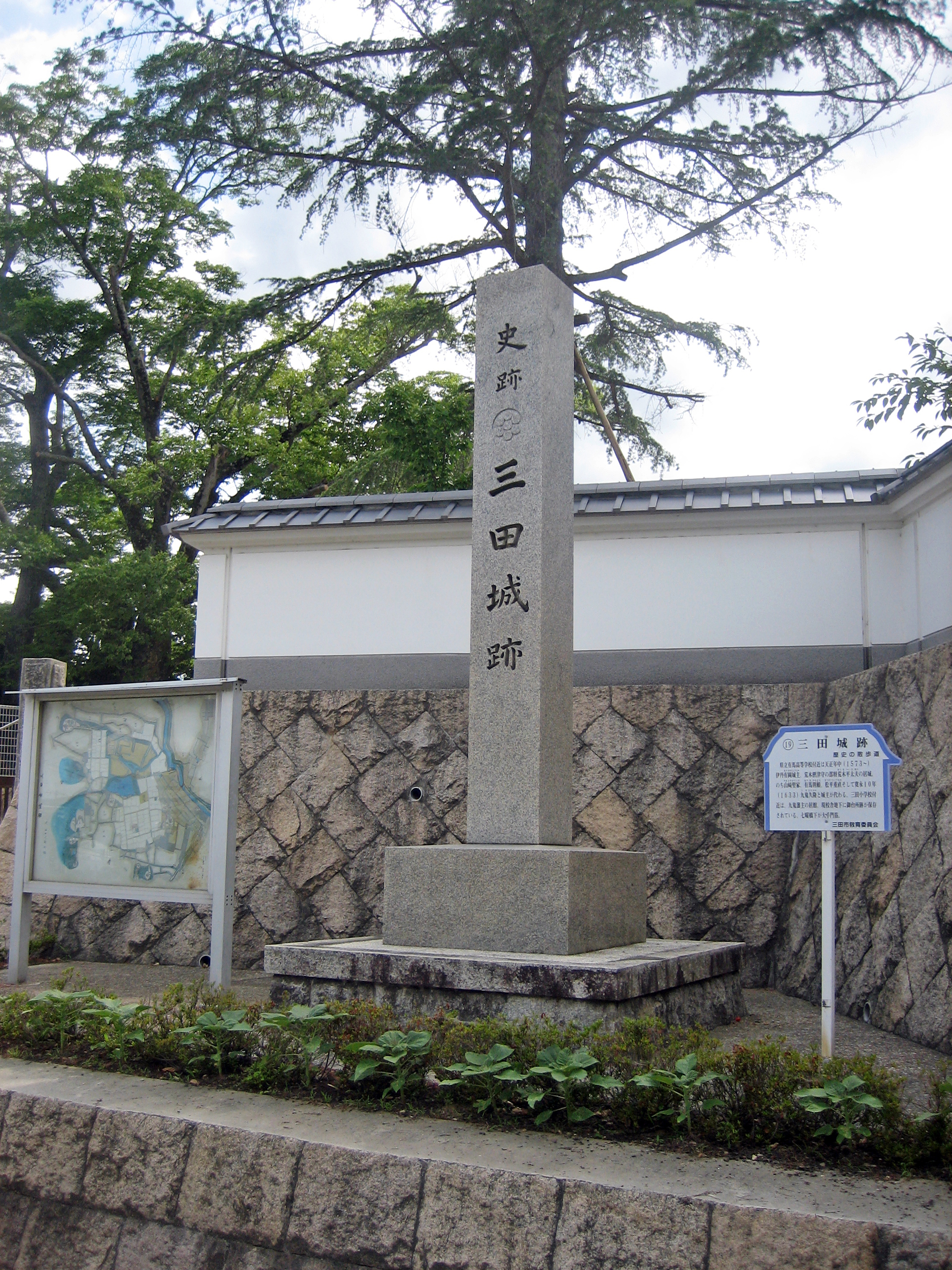
Site of Sanda Castle

Sanda Domain (三田藩, Sanda-han) was a feudal domain under the Tokugawa shogunate of Edo period Japan, located in Settsu Province in what is now the southeastern portion of modern-day Hyōgo Prefecture. It had its administrative headquarters at Sanda jin'ya (later styled "Sanda Castle"), located in what is now the city of Sanda, Hyōgo Prefecture. It was controlled by the tozama daimyō Kuki clan throughout most of its history.

== History ==
Araki Murashige conquered Settsu Province for Oda Nobunaga and rebuilt an ancient fortification which had been erected by the Akamatsu clan as Sanda Castle in 1575. After he was killed in his revolt against Nobunaga in 1582, the castle was assigned to Nobunaga's general, Yamazaki Katase as part of a 23,000 koku domain. His son, Yamazaki Iemori, although serving in the losing Western Army in the Battle of Sekigahara, was transferred to Wakasa Domain in Inaba Province with an increase to 30,000 koku by Tokugawa Ieyasu. He was replaced by Arima Noriyori, a general in the Eastern Army. On his death, the domain was merged by his heir Arima Toyōji, with Fukuchiyama Domain in Tamba Province and Sanda Castle was destroyed. Due to his exploits in the Battle of Osaka in 1620, he was promoted to 200,000 koku and transferred to Kurume Domain in Chikugo Province. In 1626, Matsudaira Shigenao, formerly of Kaminoyama Domain in Dewa Province was assigned a kokudaka of 30,000 koku, and Sanda Domain was reestablished. He was later transferred to Bungo Province. In 1633, Kuki Hisakata was transferred to Sanda from Toba Domain in Shima Province. The Kuki clan had a fleet of armored ships and controlled maritime traffic around Ise Bay, fighting on both sides during the Battle of Sekigahara, with Kuki Yoshitaka siding with the western forces loyal to Toyotomi Hideyori, and his son Kuki Moritaka, joining the eastern armies of Tokugawa Ieyasu. With the establishment of the Tokugawa shogunate, Kuki Moritaka was confirmed as daimyō of Toba, initially with a kokudaka of 35,000 koku, growing to 55,000 koku under his son Kuki Hisataka. However, on Kuki Hisakata's death, there was a succession dispute, and the shogunate punished both parties by reassigning Kuki Hirakata to inland Sanda with 36,000 koku and his brother Kuki Takase to inland Ayabe Domain in Tanba Province with 20,000 koku.

The Kuki ruled Sanda for 240 years until the Meiji restoration. However, due to their large number of retainers and reduced circumstances, the clan was always in financial difficulties. In 1742, the 7th daimyō, Kuki Takayoshi, opened a domain school, Kokkokan. In 1780, when the 8th daimyō, Kuki Takamura, raised taxes, a peasant uprising broke out, and several merchant houses in the castle town were destroyed. Kuki Takakuni, the 10th daimyō reformed the han school 'Kokkoukan' as 'Zoshikan.' He also showed an interest in Western studies, and opened the modernization of the Sanda Domain. He was also raised in status to that of a "castle-holding daimyō", although no castle was actually built. The 13th (and final) daimyō, Kuki Takayoshi, reformed domain administration and reformed the domain army along Western lines. In 1867, he led his modernized forces on the imperial side in the Battle of Toba-Fushimi to overthrow the shogunate. Upon learning that would be developed as a foreign trade port, he helped establish 'Shima San Shokai,' Kobe's first import trading company. This was successful, and he embarked on the real estate and financial businesses, and had a great influence on the urban development of Kobe. In 1871, Sanda Domain became "Sanda Prefecture" with the abolition of the han system. Later it was incorporated into Hyōgo Prefecture. In 1884, Kuki Takayoshi became a viscount (shishaku) in the new kazoku peerage.

Sanda jin'ya was located on the site of the current Arima High School, and the daimyō residence was located on the site of the current Mita Elementary School. At present, all that remains is a portion of a water moat.

== Holdings at the end of the Edo period ==
As with most domains in the han system, Sanda Domain consisted of several discontinuous territories calculated to provide the assigned kokudaka, based on periodic cadastral surveys and projected agricultural yields.

- Settsu Province
  - 53 villages in Arima District
- Tanba Province
  - 10 villages in Hikami District

== List of daimyō ==
#	Name	Tenure	Courtesy title	Court Rank	kokudaka
Yamazaki clan, 1591-1601 (Tozama)
1	Yamazaki Iemori (山崎家盛)	1591 - 1601	Sama-no-jo (左馬允)	Junior 5th Rank, Lower Grade (従五位下)	23,000 koku
Arima clan, 1601-1620 (Tozama)
1	Arima Noriyori (有馬則頼)	1601 - 1602	Nakatsukasa-no-shoyu (中務少輔)	Junior 5th Rank, Lower Grade (従五位下)	20,000 koku
under Fukuchiyama Domain 1602-1620
tenryō 1620 -1626
Nomi-Matsudaira clan, 1626-1632 (Fudai)
1	Matsudaira Shigenao (松平重直)	1626 - 1632	Tango-no-kami (丹後守)	Junior 5th Rank, Lower Grade (従五位下)	30,000 koku
Kuki clan, 1632 - 1871 (Tozama)
1	Kuki Hisataka (九鬼久隆)	1632 - 1649	Yamato-no-kami (大和守)	Junior 5th Rank, Lower Grade (従五位下)	36,000 koku
2	Kuki Takamasa (九鬼隆昌)	1639 - 1669	Nagato-no-kami (長門守)	Junior 5th Rank, Lower Grade (従五位下)	36,000 koku
3	Kuki Takanori (九鬼隆律)	1669 - 1686	Izumi-no-kami (和泉守)	Junior 5th Rank, Lower Grade (従五位下)	36,000 koku
4	Kuki Suetaka (九鬼副隆)	1686 - 1697	Nagato-no-kami (長門守)	Junior 5th Rank, Lower Grade (従五位下)	36,000 koku
5	Kuki Takahisa (九鬼隆久)	1697 - 1717	Yamato-no-kami (大和守)	Junior 5th Rank, Lower Grade (従五位下)	36,000 koku
6	Kuki Takayasu (九鬼隆抵)	1717 - 1733	Tango-no-kami (丹後守)	Junior 5th Rank, Lower Grade (従五位下)	36,000 koku
7	Kuki Takayori (九鬼隆由)	1733 - 1743	Ise-no-kami (伊勢守)	Junior 5th Rank, Lower Grade (従五位下)	36,000 koku
8	Kuki Takamura (九鬼隆邑)	1743 - 1785	Yamato-no-kami (大和守)	Junior 5th Rank, Lower Grade (従五位下)	36,000 koku
9	Kuki Takaharu (九鬼隆張)	1785 - 1798	Nagato-no-kami (長門守)	Junior 5th Rank, Lower Grade (従五位下)	36,000 koku
10	Kuki Takakuni (九鬼隆国)	1798 - 1843	Izumi-no-kami (和泉守)	Junior 5th Rank, Lower Grade (従五位下)	36,000 koku
11	Kuki Takanori (九鬼隆徳)	1843 - 1854	Nagato-no-kami (長門守)	Junior 5th Rank, Lower Grade (従五位下)	36,000 koku
12	Kuki Kiyotaka (九鬼精隆)	1854 - 1859	Nagato-no-kami (長門守)	Junior 5th Rank, Lower Grade (従五位下)	36,000 koku
13	Kuki Takayoshi (九鬼隆義)	1859 - 1871	Nagato-no-kami (長門守)	Junior 5th Rank, Lower Grade (従五位下)	36,000 koku

== See also ==
- List of Han
- Abolition of the han system
