= Ayabe Domain =

Japanese feudal domain located in Tanba Province

Ayabe Domain 綾部藩
- under Tokugawa shogunate Japan
- 1633–1871
- Capital: Ayabe jin'ya
- Area
  - Coordinates: 35°32′27.9″N 134°49′18.9″E
  - Type: Daimyō
- Historical era: Edo period
  - Established: 1633
  - Disestablished: 1871
- Today part of: part of Kyoto Prefecture

Location of Ayabe jin'ya
Ayabe Domain (Japan)

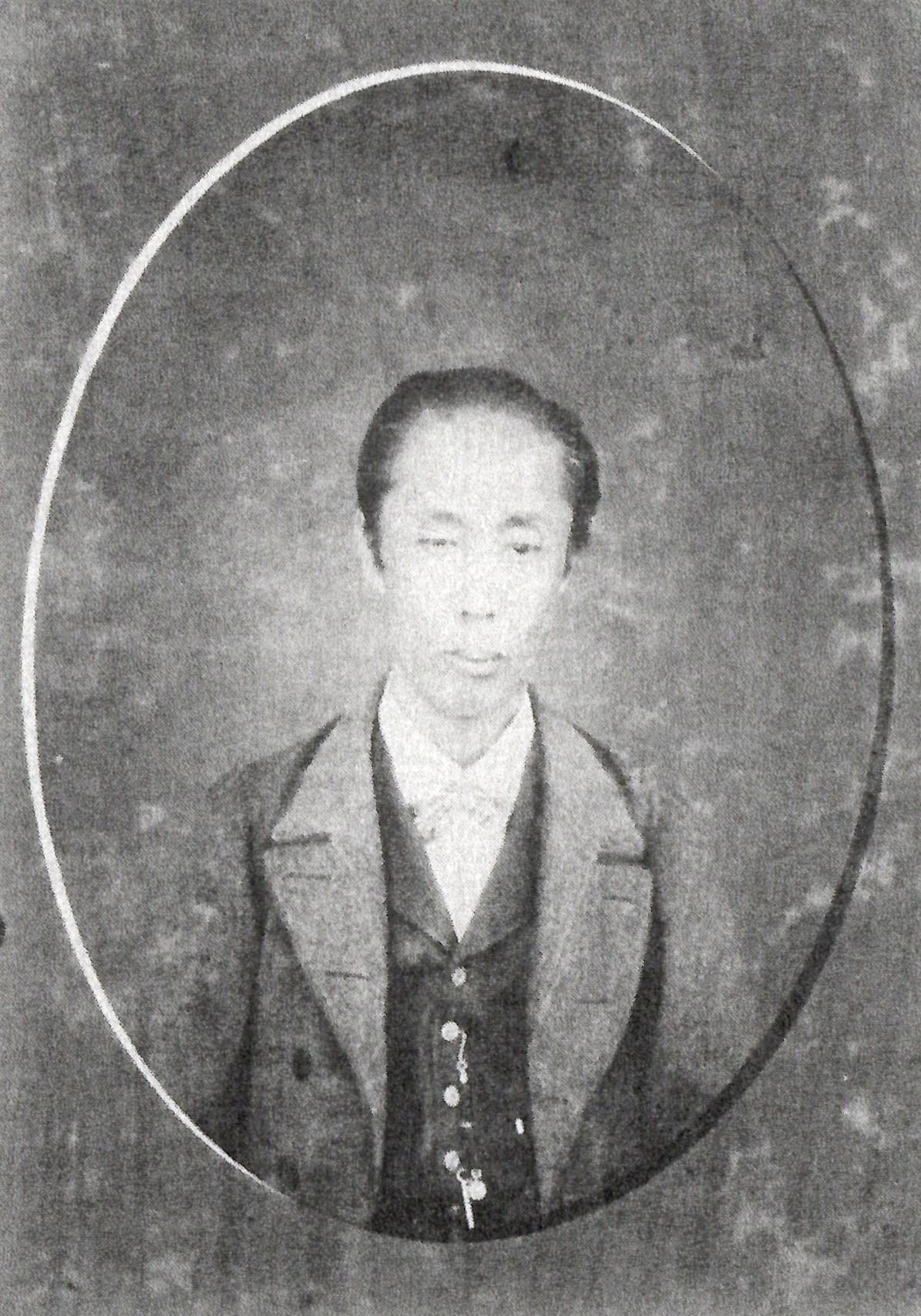
Kuki Takatomo

Ayabe Domain (綾部藩, Ayabe-han) was a feudal domain under the Tokugawa shogunate of Edo period Japan, located in Tanba Province in what is now the central portion of modern-day Kyoto Prefecture. It was centered around Ayabe jin'ya, which were located in what is now the city of Ayabe, Kyoto.

== History ==
Kuki Moritaka, the son of the Sengoku period admiral, Kuki Yoshitaka had been awarded the 35,000 koku Toba Domain. On his death in 1632, a succession dispute arose. Yoshitaka had appointed his 5th son, Kuki Hisataka as his heir, but his third son, Kuki Takasue, argued that he had the stronger clam due to primogenitor and asked for the Tokugawa shogunate for arbitration. The shogunate ruled in favor of Hisataka, but also assigned a kokudaka of 20,000 koku to Moritaka to form a new domain. This was the start of Ayabe Domain. In 1661, Takasue assigned 500 koku of this estate to his younger brother Takashige. The Kuki clan continued to rule Ayabe until the Meiji restoration.

However, during the tenure of the second daimyō, a great flood and a storm caused 3729 deaths, and the domain's finances began to decline. Repeated floods and famines occurred, and despite attempts to reform the financial system, peasant revolts frequently occurred. A han school, the "Shintokukan", was established during the tenure of Kuki Takanao. The eighth daimyō, Kuki Takahiro, brought in outside advisors (including Satō Nobuhiro) to reform agricultural and military policies. A clan monopoly system on cotton from 1847 helped restore the domain's finances. The final daimyō, Kuki Takatomo had served Emperor Kōmei as a guard during the Kinmon incident and at the start of the Boshin War was one of the first supporters of the Meiji government. Following the Meiji restoration he was made viscount (shishaku) in the kazoku peerage. In 1871, with the abolition of the han system, Ayabe Domain became "Ayabe Prefecture" and subsequently became part of Kyoto Prefecture. The site of the Ayabe jin'ya is now the Kyoto Prefectural Ayabe Senior High School.

== Holdings at the end of the Edo period ==
Most domains in the han system, which consisted of several discontinuous territories calculated to provide the assigned kokudaka, based on periodic cadastral surveys and projected agricultural yields.

- Tanba Province
  - 5 villages in Funai District
  - 32 villages in Ikaruga District
  - 25 villages in Amata District

== List of daimyō ==
#	Name	Tenure	Courtesy title	Court Rank	kokudaka
Kuki clan, 1633-1871 (Tozama)
1	Kuki Takasue (九鬼隆季)	1633 - 1674	Shikibu-shōyū (式部少輔)	Junior 5th Rank, Lower Grade (従五位下)	20,000 -> 19,500 koku
2	Kuki Takatsune (九鬼隆常)	1674 - 1698	Ōsumi-no-kami (大隅守)	Junior 5th Rank, Lower Grade (従五位下)	19,500 koku
3	Kuki Takanao (九鬼隆直)	1698 - 1713	Nagato-no-kami (長門守)	Junior 5th Rank, Lower Grade (従五位下)	19,500 koku
4	Kuki Takanobu (九鬼隆寛)	1713 - 1766	Bingo-no-kami (備後守)	Junior 5th Rank, Lower Grade (従五位下)	19,500 koku
5	Kuki Takasada (九鬼隆貞)	1766 - 1780	Shikibu-shōyū (式部少輔)	Junior 5th Rank, Lower Grade (従五位下)	19,500 koku
6	Kuki Takayoshi (九鬼隆棋)	1780 - 1787	Ōsumi-no-kami (大隅守)	Junior 5th Rank, Lower Grade (従五位下)	19,500 koku
7	Kuki Takasato (九鬼隆郷)	1787 - 1808	Shikibu-shōyū (式部少輔)	Junior 5th Rank, Lower Grade (従五位下)	19,500 koku
8	Kuki Takanori (九鬼隆度)	1808 - 1822	Izumo-no-kami (出雲守)	Junior 5th Rank, Lower Grade (従五位下)	19,500 koku
9	Kuki Takahiro (九鬼隆都)	1808 - 1861	Shikibu-shōyū (式部少輔)	Junior 5th Rank, Lower Grade (従五位下)	19,500 koku
10	Kuki Takamoto (九鬼隆備)	1861 - 1871	Ōsumi-no-kami (大隅守)	Junior 5th Rank, Upper Grade (従五位上)	19,500 koku

== See also ==
- List of Han
- Abolition of the han system
