= Toba Domain =

Japanese domain of the Edo period

Toba Domain 鳥羽藩
- Domain of Japan
- 1597-1871
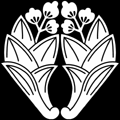
- Mon of the Inagaki clan

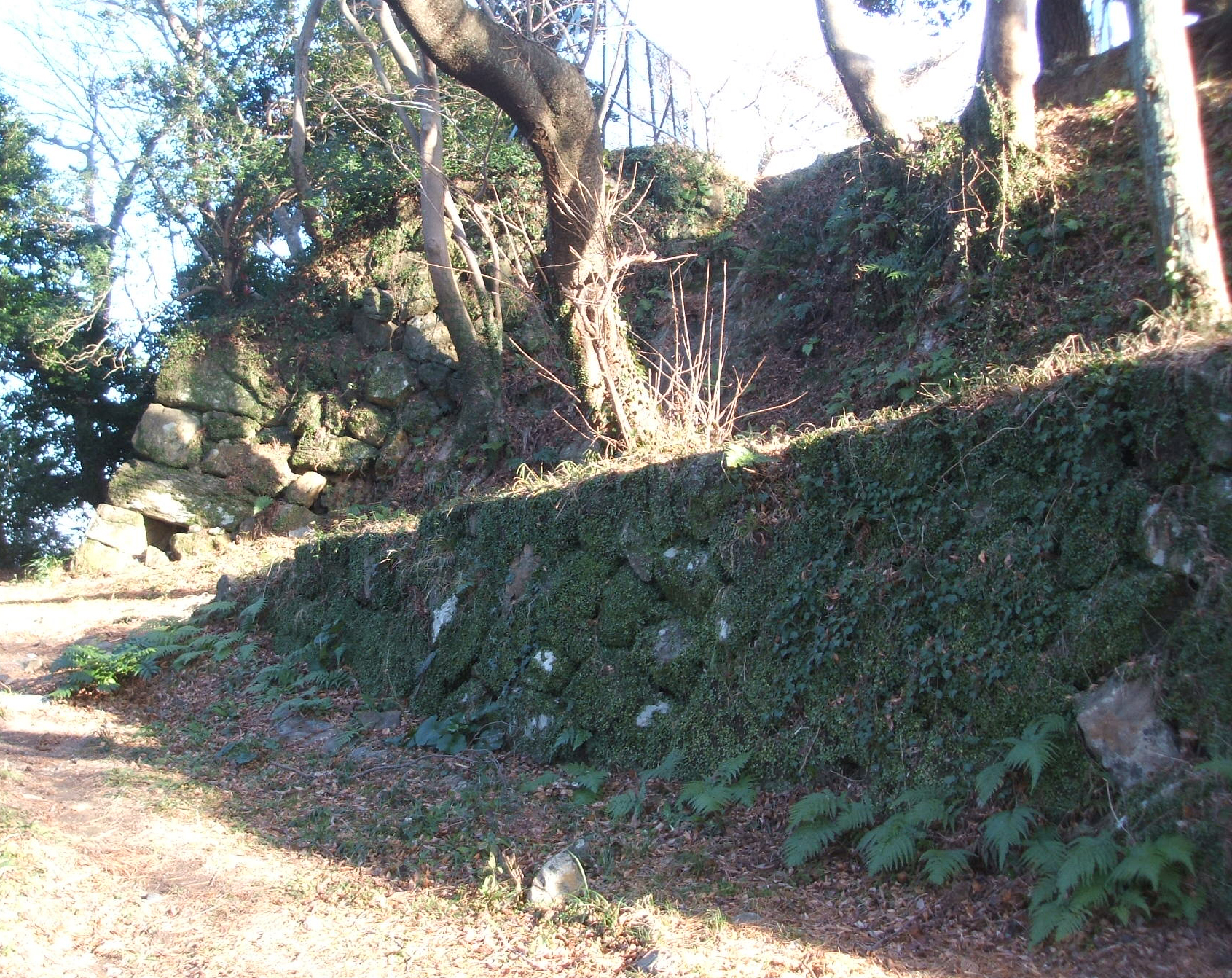
- Ruins of Toba Castle
- Capital: Toba Castle
- Government
  - Type: Daimyō
- Daimyō
  - 1597-1632: Kuki Moritaka (first)
  - 1868-1871: Inagaki Nagahiro (last)
- Historical era: Edo period
  - Established: 1597
  - Disestablished: 1871
- Today part of: Mie Prefecture

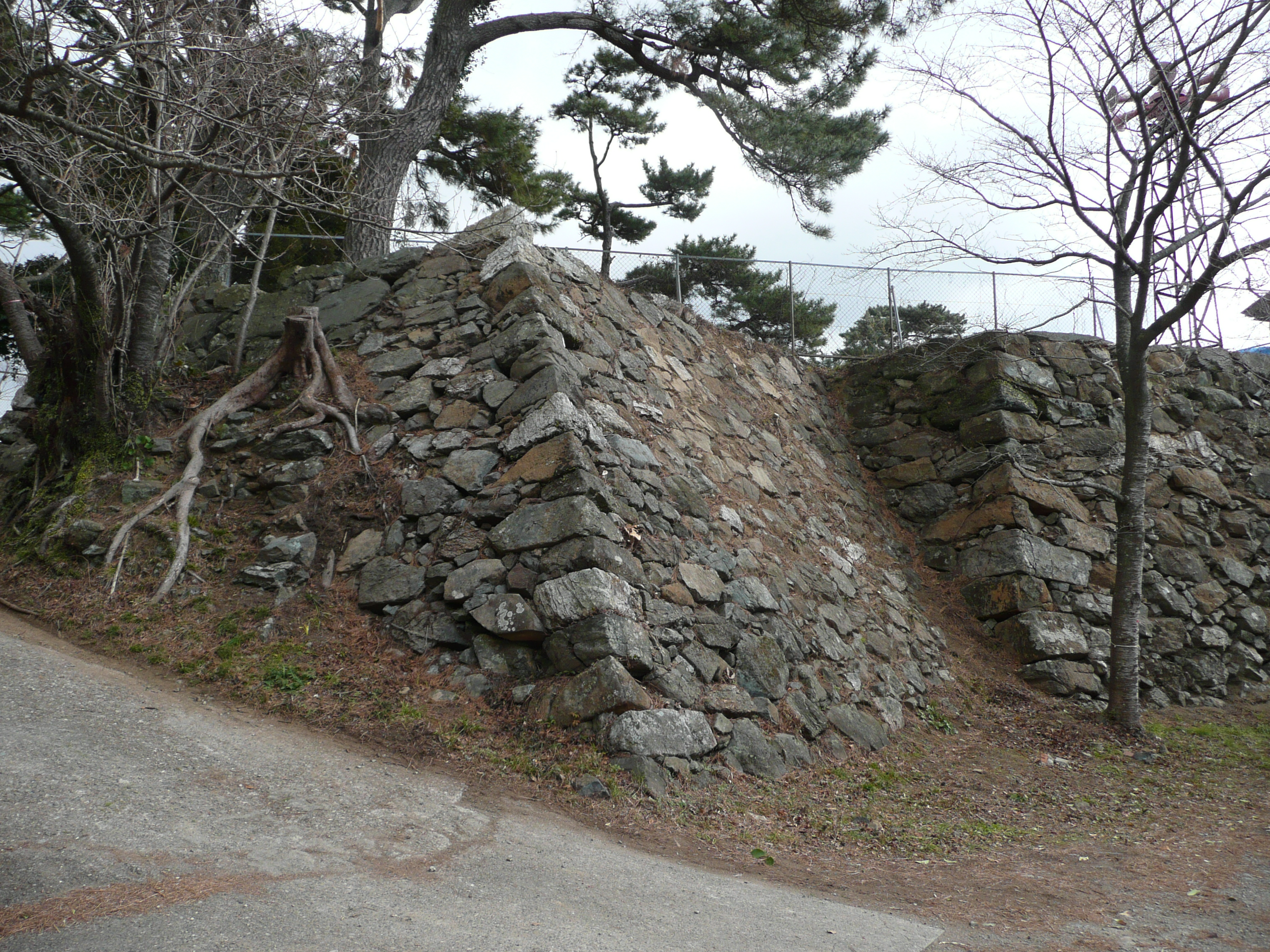
Remnants of the walls of Toba Castle

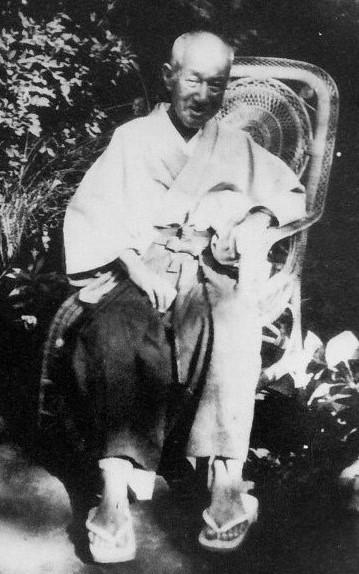
Inagaki Nagahiro, final daimyo of Toba Domain

Toba Domain (鳥羽藩, Toba-han) was a Japanese domain of the Edo period, located in Shima Province (part of modern-day Mie Prefecture), Japan. It was centered on Toba Castle in what is now the city of Toba.

== History ==
During the Sengoku period, most of Shima Province came under the control of Kuki Yoshitaka, a retainer of Oda Nobunaga, who had a fleet of armored ships and controlled maritime traffic around Ise Bay. The Kuki clan fought on both sides during the Battle of Sekigahara, with Kuki Yoshitaka siding with the western forces loyal to Toyotomi Hideyori, and his son Kuki Moritaka, joining the eastern armies of Tokugawa Ieyasu. With the establishment of the Tokugawa shogunate, Kuki Moritaka was confirmed as daimyō of Toba, initially with a kokudaka of 35,000 koku, growing to 55,000 koku under his son Kuki Hisataka, who was transferred to Sanda Domain in Settsu Province in 1632.

The Kuki were replaced by a cadet branch of the Naitō clan, which ruled Toba until Naito Tadakatsu was forced to commit seppuku after killing fellow daimyō Nagai Naonaga in 1680. The domain then reverted to tenryō status under the direct control of the shogunate several months before it was reassigned to the Doi clan (1681–1691), Ogyu-Matsudaira clan (1691–1710), Itakura clan (1710–1717), and Toda-Matsudaira clan (1717–1725) before finally coming under the Inagaki clan (1725–1871), where it remained until the Meiji Restoration.

During the Boshin War, the domain remained loyal to the Shogunate and its forces fought in the Tokugawa army during the Battle of Toba-Fushimi. However, daimyō Inagaki Nagayuki was underage, and remained in Edo during the battle. After the Tokugawa defeat, the domain defected to the Imperial side, and as a result was fined heavily by the Meiji government. Inagaki Nagayuki was forced into retirement. His son, Inagaki Nagahiro became domain governor, and after the abolition of the han system in July 1871, Toba Domain became "Toba Prefecture", which merged with the short-lived "Watarai Prefecture" in November 1871, which later became part of Mie Prefecture.

== Bakumatsu period holdings ==
As with most domains in the han system, Toba Domain consisted of several discontinuous territories calculated to provide the assigned kokudaka, based on periodic cadastral surveys and projected agricultural yields.

- Shima Province
  - 37 villages in Tōshi District
  - 19 villages in Ago District
- Ise Province
  - 8 villages in Iino District
  - 4 villages in Taki District
  - 5 villages in Watarai District

== List of daimyō ==
#	Name	Tenure	Courtesy title	Court Rank	kokudaka	
Kuki clan (fudai) 1597–1632
1	Kuki Moritaka (九鬼守隆)	1597–1632	Nagato-no-kami (長門守)	Junior 5th Rank, Lower Grade (従五位下) 35,000 koku		
2	Kuki Hisataka (九鬼久隆)	1632–1632	Yamato-no-kami (大和守)	Junior 5th Rank, Lower Grade (従五位下)	35,000 → 56,000 koku	
Naitō clan (fudai) 1633–1680
1	Naitō Tadashige (内藤忠重)	1633–1653	Shima-no-kami (志摩守)	Junior 5th Rank, Lower Grade (従五位下)	35,000 koku	
2	Naitō Tadamasa (内藤忠政)	1653–1673	Hida-no-kami (飛騨守)	Junior 5th Rank, Lower Grade (従五位下)	35,000 koku	
3	Naitō Tadakatsu (内藤忠勝)	1673–1680	Izumi-no-kami (和泉守)	Junior 5th Rank, Lower Grade (従五位下)	35,000 koku	
Doi clan (fudai) 1681–1691
1	Doi Toshimasu (土井利益)	1681–1691	Suwo-no-kami (周防守)	Junior 5th Rank, Lower Grade (従五位下)	70,000 koku	
Ogyū-Matsudaira clan (fudai) 1691–1710
1	Matsudaira Norisato (松平乗邑)	1691–1710	Izumi-no-kami (和泉守)	Junior 5th Rank, Lower Grade (従五位下)	60,000 koku	
Itakura clan (fudai) 1710–1717
1	Itakura Shigeharu (板倉重治)	1710–1717	Omi-no-kami (近江守)	Junior 5th Rank, Lower Grade (従五位下)		50,000 koku
Toda-Matsudaira clan (fudai) 1717–1725
1	Matsudaira Mitsuchika (松平光慈)	1717–1725	Tamba-no-kami (丹波守)	Junior 5th Rank, Lower Grade (従五位下)		70,000 koku
Inagaki clan (fudai) 1725–1871
1	Inagaki Terukata (稲垣昭賢)	1725–1752	Shinano-no-kami (信濃守)	Junior 5th Rank, Lower Grade (従五位下)	30,000 koku	
2	Inagaki Terunaga (稲垣昭央)	1752–1773	Tsushima-no-kami (対馬守)	Junior 5th Rank, Lower Grade (従五位下)	30,000 koku	
3	Inagaki Nagamochi (稲垣長以)	1773–1794	Settsu-no-kami (摂津守)	Junior 5th Rank, Lower Grade (従五位下)	30,000 koku	
4	Inagaki Nagatsugu (稲垣長続)	1794–1818	Tsushima-no-kami (対馬守)	Junior 5th Rank, Lower Grade (従五位下)	30,000 koku	
5	Inagaki Nagakata (稲垣長剛)	1818–1842	Tsushima-no-kami (対馬守)	Junior 5th Rank, Lower Grade (従五位下)	30,000 koku	
6	Inagaki Nagaaki (稲垣長明)	1842–1866	Settsu-no-kami (摂津守)	Junior 5th Rank, Lower Grade (従五位下)	30,000 koku	
7	Inagaki Nagayuki (稲垣長行)	1866–1868	Settsu-no-kami (摂津守)	Junior 5th Rank, Lower Grade (従五位下)	30,000 koku	
8	Inagaki Nagahiro (稲垣長敬)	1868–1871	Tsushima-no-kami (対馬守)	Junior 5th Rank, Lower Grade (従五位下)	30,000 koku	

== See also ==
- List of han
- Abolition of the han system
