= Mitsugi Ohno =

Japanese-American artist and glass engineer (1926–1999)

- Ohno in 1999
- Born: June 28, 1926; Bato, Tochigi Prefecture, Japan
- Died: October 22, 1999 (aged 73); Manhattan, Kansas, U.S.
- Occupation: Glassblower

Mitsugi Ohno (大野 貢, Ōno Mitsugi; June 28, 1926 – October 22, 1999) was a Japanese glassblower who worked at the University of Tokyo (1947–1960) and Kansas State University (1961–1996). He was known for blowing a glass Klein bottle and glass models of historic buildings and ships. He told people "Anything that can be made with glass I can make it."

== Early life ==
Mitsugi Ohno was born June 28, 1926, in Bato-machi, Tochigi-ken, Japan. His parents were Shigeo Ohno and Tsuya Ohgane Ohno, heads of the family rice farm in Bato-machi. He was the third son of seven children (Tsukasa, Hitoshi, Mitsugi, Kazuko, Rinko, Midori, and Mutsuko). He graduated from Kitamukata Elementary School in 1939. Because of his rebellious nature, after graduating from 6th grade, his parents sent him to be an apprentice with his uncle, who owned the Takagi Scientific Glass Instrument Company in Tokyo.

== Glassblowing in Japan ==
Ohno served as an apprentice from 1939 to 1945. During the war, he also worked as a glassblower in the research department of the Naval Medical Supply Division, reporting to Lieutenant Commander Yanagida. His apprenticeship ended on March 10, 1945, when the factory was burned down and his uncle was killed during the Bombing of Tokyo in World War II. At the age of 19, he returned to the family farm after World War II for two years.

In 1946, Professor Yanagida, who had returned to the Department of Chemistry University of Tokyo, invited him to work as the departmental glassblower, a position he held from 1947 to 1960. He became close friends with graduate students, who told him that his temperament was more suited to America. He emigrated to the U.S. on February 5, 1961, at the age of 35 with his wife Kimiyo (29), son Tsutomu (5), and daughter Hiroko (5 months). His second daughter, Julie, was born in Manhattan, Kansas in 1971.

== Glassblowing in Kansas ==
Professor Alvin B. Cardwell at Kansas State University offered him a position as a scientific glassblower for the University and he made scientific glassware used by physics and chemistry researchers at the university from 1961 until he retired from the position in 1996.

=== Klein bottle ===
Mitsugi Ohno with the glass model of the United States Capitol (1975)

In 1961, Professor Cardwell asked Mitsugi Ohno to construct a true glass Klein bottle, a one-sided figure formally described as “an enclosure continuous with its outer surface constructed by twisting a tube through an opening in the side of the tube and joining it to the other end". Klein bottles had previously been made by other glassblowers, but their versions were sealed and did not have an open hole where the tube went through the side of the bottle. After several days of failing to make such a Klein bottle with an opening, he declared it impossible. However, the solution to the problem was revealed in a dream and he rushed to his office to make it. It was the most difficult glass piece that he made in his long career, and the accomplishment of which he was most proud. His first successful version of a Klein bottle is on permanent display at Kansas State University's Student Union.

== Historic ships and buildings ==
Ohno became known for producing glass scale-sculptures of historic buildings and ships, which he donated to local, national and international institutions.

His first piece of work was a model of the USS Constitution, presented to First Lady Mamie Eisenhower at the Eisenhower Presidential Center in 1972. His biggest project was the glass model of the United States Capitol, created for Bicentennial celebrations and still prominently displayed at the Smithsonian Institution. He completed 24 glass sculptures.

One of his lifetime highlights was a meeting with Emperor Akihito and Empress Michiko of Japan in 1992, which was attended by President and Mrs. Jon Wefald of Kansas State University, and Ohno's lifelong friend Professor Clifton Meloan and his wife. The University presented the Emperor and Empress with a glass model of the Himeji Castle, which now resides in the Imperial Palace in Tokyo.

== Selected historic glass models ==
Year	Title	Current residence of model
1972	USS Constitution	Eisenhower Presidential Museum
1972	U.S. Independence Hall	The National Archives
1973	Alvin B. Cardwell Hall, KSU	Kansas State University
1975	James A McCain Hall, KSU	Kansas State University
1976	U.S. Capitol Building	Smithsonian National Museum of American History
1977	Anderson Hall, KSU	Kansas State University
1980	White House	Reagan Presidential Museum
1984	Chemistry Hall, University of Tokyo	University of Tokyo
1987	A ceremonial carriage and harp	Imperial Palace, Tokyo, Japan
1988	Nikkō Tōshō-gū	Tochigi Prefectural Public Hall, Utsunomiya, Tochigi-ken, Japan
1991	Three festival floats	Bato-cho Province Historical Hall, Bato-cho, Tochigi-ken, Japan
1992	Himeji Castle	Hyogo Historical Museum, Himeji-shi, Hyōgo-ken, Japan
1992	The sailing vessel Mayflower	Kansas State University
1992	Columbus' Three Ships: Niña, Pinta, and Santa María	Kansas State University
1992	USS Nimitz	Kansas State University
1994	The sailing vessel Nihon Maru	The Imperial Palace, Tokyo, Japan
1995	USS Missouri	Kansas State University
1996	USS Constitution	Kansas State University
1997	The sailing vessel Kanrin-maru	Japanese Consulate General, Kansas City
1998	HMS Victoria	Kansas State University
1998	Two-story home of Dwight Eisenhower	Dwight D. Eisenhower Presidential Museum

== End of career ==
Mitsugi Ohno was diagnosed with gastric cancer in January 1999. He ended his 60-year glassblowing career on October 4, 1999, with a two-hour work session on the unfinished Japanese ship Kanrin-maru. Ohno died peacefully in his sleep on October 22, 1999. The unfinished ship and the tools he used during his career are on display in the Department of Chemistry, Kansas State University. He was survived by his widow, Nao Ohno, three children and four grandchildren.

== Sources ==
- A Japanese in Kansas: A Man Captivated by Glass. Mitsugi Ohno. Published in Japan by Kodansha: Tokyo, Japan 1990. ISBN 4-06-204233-9
- Tokens and Treasures: Gifts to Twelve Presidents. Lisa B. Auel, Editor. National Archives and Records Administration and the White House Historical Association, 1996. ISBN 1-880875-10-1
