= Battle of Angolpo =

1592 Japan–Korea naval battle

- Part of the Imjin War
Date	August 16, 1592 (Gregorian Calendar); July 10, 1592 (Lunar calendar)
Location	Angolpo, South Sea, Korea
Result	Korean victory

Belligerents
Fleet of Toyotomi Hideyoshi	Joseon navy

Commanders and leaders
Kuki Yoshitaka; Kato Yoshiaki	Yi Sun-sin; Yi Ŏkki; Wŏn Kyun

Strength
42 ships	56 warships

Casualties and losses
20 ships	19 dead 114 wounded

- Battle of Angolpo
- Hangul: 안골포 해전
- Hanja: 安骨浦海戰
- RR: Angolpo haejeon
- MR: An'golp'o haejŏn

The Battle of Angolpo took on 16 August 1592 two days after the Battle of Hansando. In two naval encounters, Korean Admiral Yi Sun-sin's fleet managed to destroy roughly 100 Japanese ships and halted Japanese naval operations along the southern coast.

== Overview ==
News of the Japanese defeat at the Battle of Hansando reached Busan within hours and two Japanese commanders, Kuki Yoshitaka and Kato Yoshiaki, immediately set sail with 42 ships for the port of Angolpo, where they hoped to face the Korean fleet close to shore.

Yi Sun-sin received news of their movements on 16 August and he advanced towards Angolpo to confront them. This time the Japanese were unwilling to follow the Koreans into open water and stayed onshore. They would not take the bait. In response, the Korean fleet moved forwards and bombarded the anchored Japanese fleet for hours until they retreated inland. Later, the Japanese returned and escaped on the surviving 22 vessels, including their heavily damaged flagship Nihon Maru. Both Kuki Yoshitaka and Kato Yoshiaki survived the battle.

== Aftermath ==
Wŏn Kyun was left behind to mop up Japanese soldiers marooned on a small isle, but fled after receiving a false report of a large Japanese fleet approaching. The Japanese managed to drift to shore using rafts made from the wreckage of their ships.

On 23 August, Hideyoshi Toyotomi ordered naval commander Todo Takatora to reinforce operations in Korea and halted naval operations at Busan.

The battles of Hansan Island and Angolpo forced Hideyoshi to give a direct order to his naval commanders to cease all unnecessary naval operations and limit activity to the immediate area around Pusan Harbor. He told his commanders that he would come to Korea personally to lead the naval forces himself, but Hideyoshi was never able to carry through on this as his health was deteriorating rapidly. This meant that all the fighting would be in Korea, not China, and that Pyongyang would be the furthest northwestern advance of the Japanese armies (to be sure, Katō Kiyomasa's second contingent's brief march into Manchuria was Japan's northernmost advance, however, Manchuria was not a part of Imperial China in the 16th century). While Hideyoshi was unlikely to be able to invade China and conquer a large part of it, the battles of Hansan Island and Angolpo checked his supply routes and hindered his movements in Korea. Hideyoshi's larger war plans, supported in much written documentation, was nearly identical to Imperial Japan's blueprint for conquest in the 20th century.

== Bibliography ==
- Hawley, Samuel (2005). The Imjin War: Japan's Sixteenth-Century Invasion of Korea and Attempt to Conquer China. Republic of Korea and U.S.A.: The Royal Asiatic Society/The Institute of East Asian Studies.
- Turnbull, Stephen (2002). Samurai Invasion: Japan's Korean War. Great Britain: Cassell & Co.
- Sohn, Pow Key, ed. (1977). Nanjung Ilgi: War Diary of Admiral Yi Sun-Shin. Republic of Korea: Yonsei University Press.
- Kim, Yuhan (2025). Hansando and Busan 1592: Admiral Yi Sun-sin's First Victories against Japan. London: Osprey Publishing. ISBN 978-1472868862.

== See also ==
- The Four Campaigns of Admiral Yi during the Imjin Year (1592)
- Siege of Jinju (1592)
- Battle of Haengju
- Battle of Myeongnyang
- Battle of Hansando
