= Shima Province =

Former province of Japan

Map of Japanese provinces (1868) with Shima Province highlighted

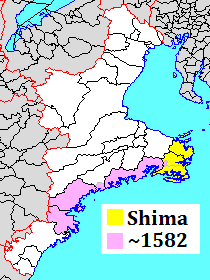
Shima Province map

Shima Province (志摩国, Shima no Kuni; Japanese pronunciation: [ɕí.mä̀ (nò̞ kɯ̈̀.ɲ̟ì)]) was a province of Japan which consisted of a peninsula in the southeastern part of modern Mie Prefecture. Its abbreviated name was Shishū (志州). Shima bordered on Ise Province to the west, and on Ise Bay on the north, east and south. It roughly coincides with the modern municipalities of Shima and Toba.

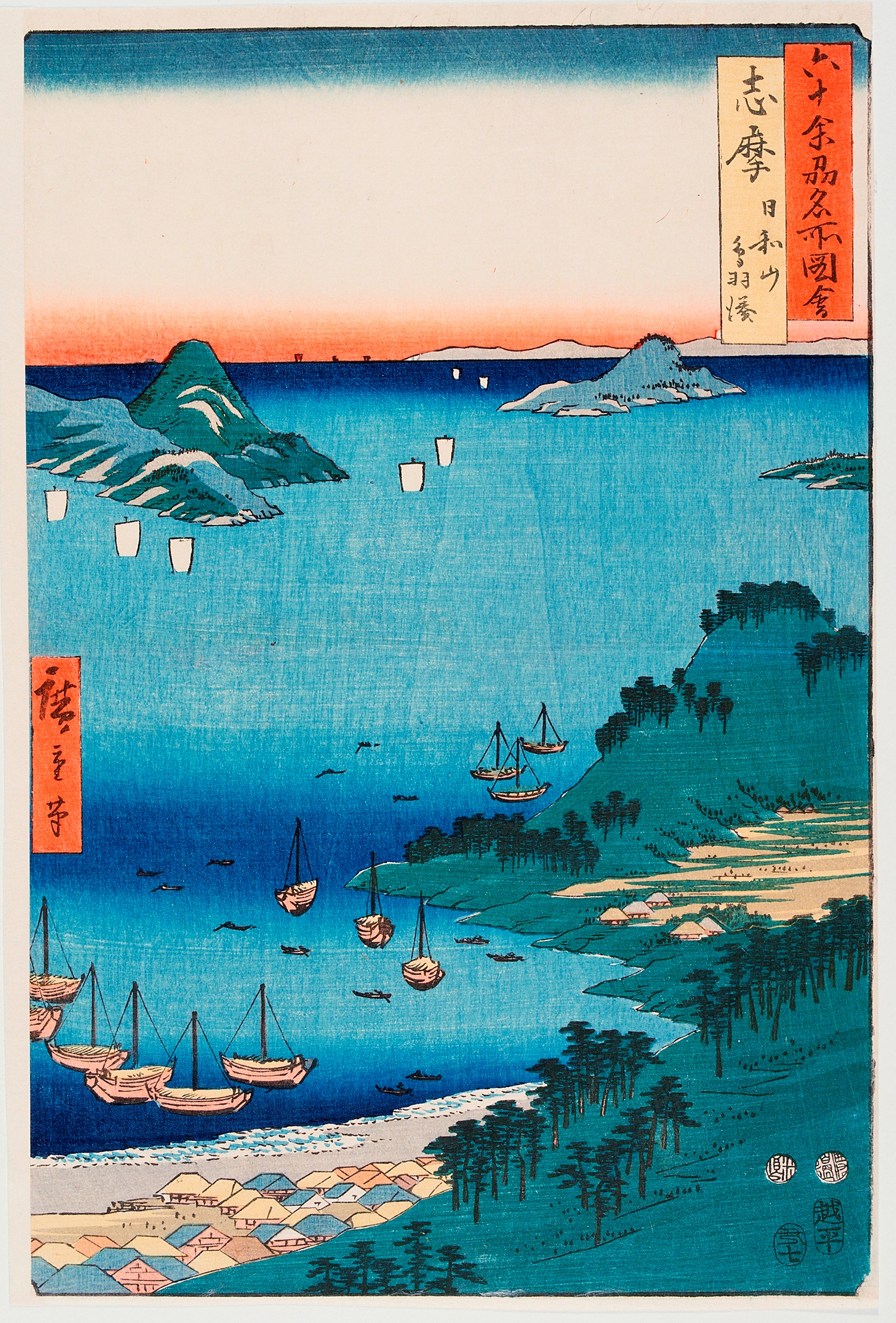
Ukiyo-e print by Hiroshige "Shima" in The Famous Scenes of the Sixty States (六十余州名所図会), depicting Hiyoriyama and Toba Bay

Shima is classified as one of the provinces of the Tōkaidō, and was the smallest of all provinces. Under the Engishiki classification system, Shima was ranked as an "inferior country" (下国) and a "near country" (近国), in terms of its distance from the capital.

== History ==
Shima was an autonomous district of Ise Province, noted as a prosperous fishing region, and during the Nara period governors of the district were responsible for providing annual gifts of fish and abalone to the Emperor. It was separated from Ise Province during the late 7th or early 8th centuries. During the Asuka period and Nara period it was dominated by the Takahashi clan. As the arable land area of Shima Province was very small, portions of the rice lands of Ise Province, as well as Mikawa Province and Owari Province were considered as part of the taxable revenues of Shima Province for the purpose of upkeep of its provincial capital, shrines and temples.

The exact location of the provincial capital is not known, but is traditionally believed to have been in Ago, currently part of the city of Shima where the ruins of the Kokubun-ji of Shima Province have been discovered. The Ichinomiya of the province is the Izawa-no-miya (伊雑宮), one of the subsidiary shrines within the Ise Grand Shrine complex.

During the Kamakura period Shima came under the control of Hōjō clan, followed by the Kitabatake clan for much of the Muromachi period, although the Kuki clan, originally pirates in Ise Bay based at Toba Castle dominated much of the coastal areas by the end of the Sengoku period. Ohama Kagetaka was also a pirate operating in the Ise Bay area of Shima Province during the 16th century.

With the establishment of the Tokugawa shogunate, Kuki Moritaka was confirmed as daimyō of Toba, initially with revenues of 35,000 koku, growing to 55,000 koku under his son Kuki Hisataka, who was transferred to Sanda Domain in Settsu Province.

The Kuki were replaced by the tozama Naitō clan, which ruled Toba to 1680. The domain then reverted to tenryō status under the direct control of the Shogunate for one year. It then came under the control of the Doi clan (1681–1691), Ogyu-Matsudaira clan (1691–1710), Itakura clan (1710–1717), and Toda-Matsudaira clan (1717–1725) before finally coming under the Inagaki clan (1725–1871), where it remained until the Meiji Restoration.

During the Boshin War, Inagaki Nagayuki remained loyal to the Shogunate, and as a result was fined heavily by the Meiji government and forced into retirement. His son, Inagaki Nagahiro became domain governor, and after the abolition of the han system in July 1871, Toba Domain became "Toba Prefecture", which merged with the short lived "Watarai Prefecture" of former Ise Province in November 1871, which later became part of Mie Prefecture.

== Historical districts ==
- Mie Prefecture
  - Ago District (英虞郡) - merged with Tōshi District to become Shima District (志摩郡) on March 29, 1896
  - Tōshi District (答志郡) - merged with Ago District to become Shima District on March 29, 1896

== Bakumatsu period domains ==
Name	type	daimyō	kokudaka
Toba Domain	fudai	Inagaki	30,000 koku
