= Ankokuji Ekei =

Military monk and diplomat of the Mōri clan (1539–1600)

- 安国寺 恵瓊
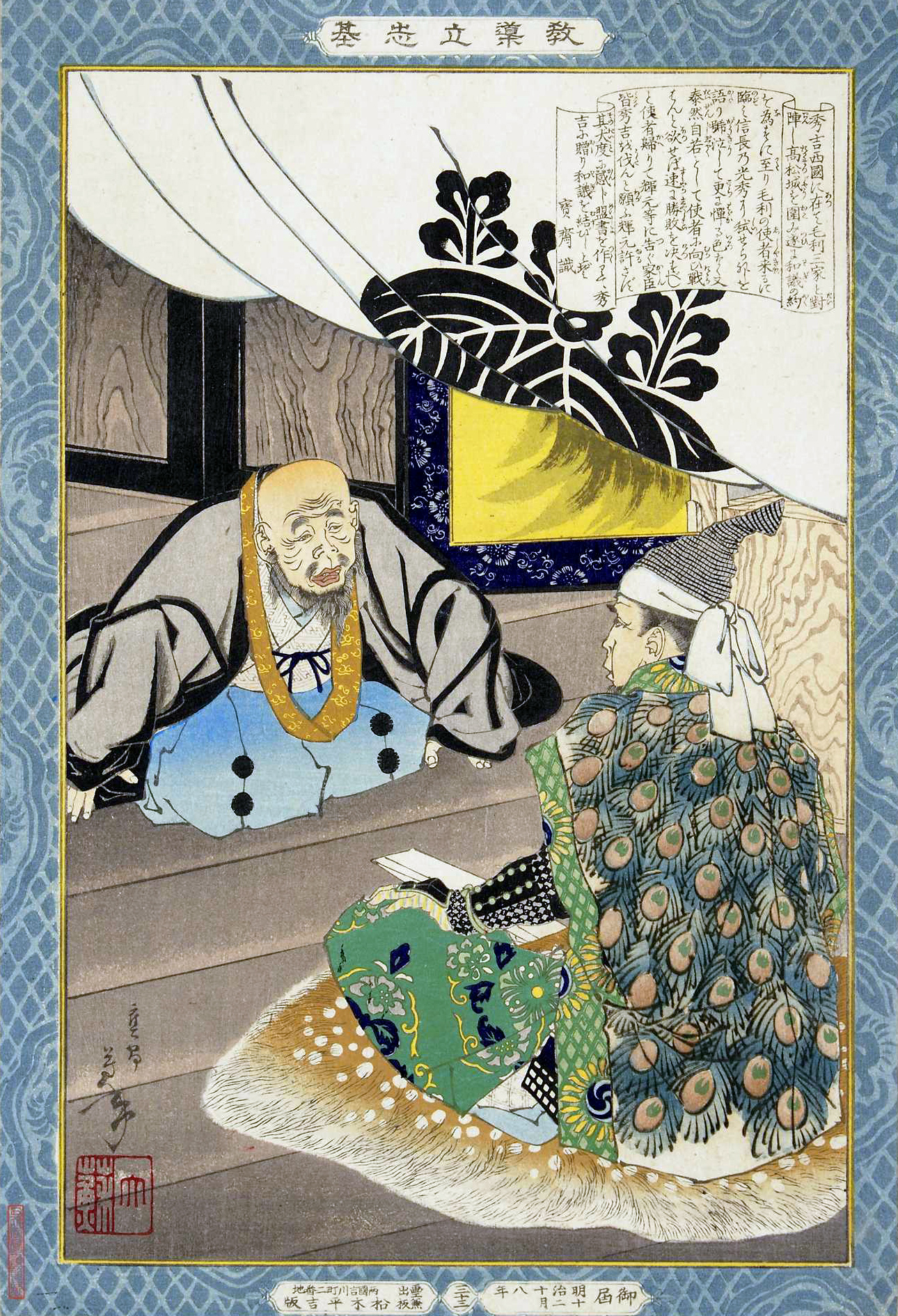
- Ankokuji Ekei and Toyotomi Hideyoshi
- Born: 1539; Aki Province
- Died: November 6, 1600 (aged 60–61); Kyoto
- Military career
- Allegiance: Mori clan Toyotomi clan Western Army
- Conflicts: Siege of Takamatsu; Invasion of Shikoku; Kyushu Campaign; Siege of Shimoda; Korean Campaign; Battle of Sekigahara

Yōho Ekei (瑶甫 恵瓊; 1539 – November 6, 1600), commonly known as Ankokuji Ekei (安国寺 恵瓊), was a military monk and a descendant of the Takeda clan of Aki Province. He served the Mōri clan and later the Toyotomi clan.

"Ankokuji" is not a surname, but rather an alternative name derived from Ankoku-ji Temple (安国寺) in Aki Province, where he served as head priest.

== Biography ==
Traditionally, he was believed to be descended from the Aki branch of Takeda clan. Although it is certain that he was from the Aki Takeda clan, there are various theories about his birth year and father, and the former is said to have been in 1537 or 1539. There are two theories about the father: one says that Takeda Nobushige († 1541) was his father, and the other says that Takeda Shigekiyo († 1541), the father of Nobushige, was his father. In 1541, when the Aki Takeda were destroyed by Mori Motonari, he was taken away by faithful vassals and put in a safe place in Ankokuji Temple in Aki Province. He became a Rinzai Buddhist monk, and a diplomat of Mōri clan.

In 1582, during the Siege of Takamatsu, Mori sent Ekei to Kuroda Kanbei, offering peace negotiations with Hideyoshi.

In 1585, he was praised by Toyotomi Hideyoshi for his negotiation when the Mori clan formally served Hideyoshi, and become a close adviser of Hideyoshi. He was given a fiefdom of 23,000 koku in Iyo Province as a reward after the invasion of Shikoku (1585).

In 1587, after he took part of the Kyushu Campaign, his holdings were expanded to 60,000 koku.

In 1590, he participated in the Odawara Campaign at siege of Shimoda.

In 1592, he participated in the Imjin War, and lost the Battle of Uiryong to Gwak Jae-u.

In 1600, at the Battle of Sekigahara, he fought against Tokugawa Ieyasu. He was later taken prisoner and condemned to death in Kyoto, along with Ishida Mitsunari and Konishi Yukinaga.

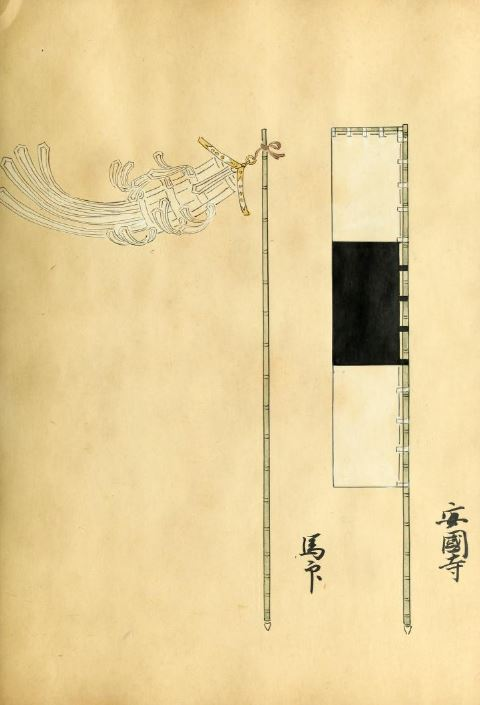
Ankokuji Ekei Banner and Battle Standard

== See also ==
- Buddhism in Japan
- List of Rinzai Buddhists
