= Atakebune =

Japanese warships in the sixteenth and seventeenth century

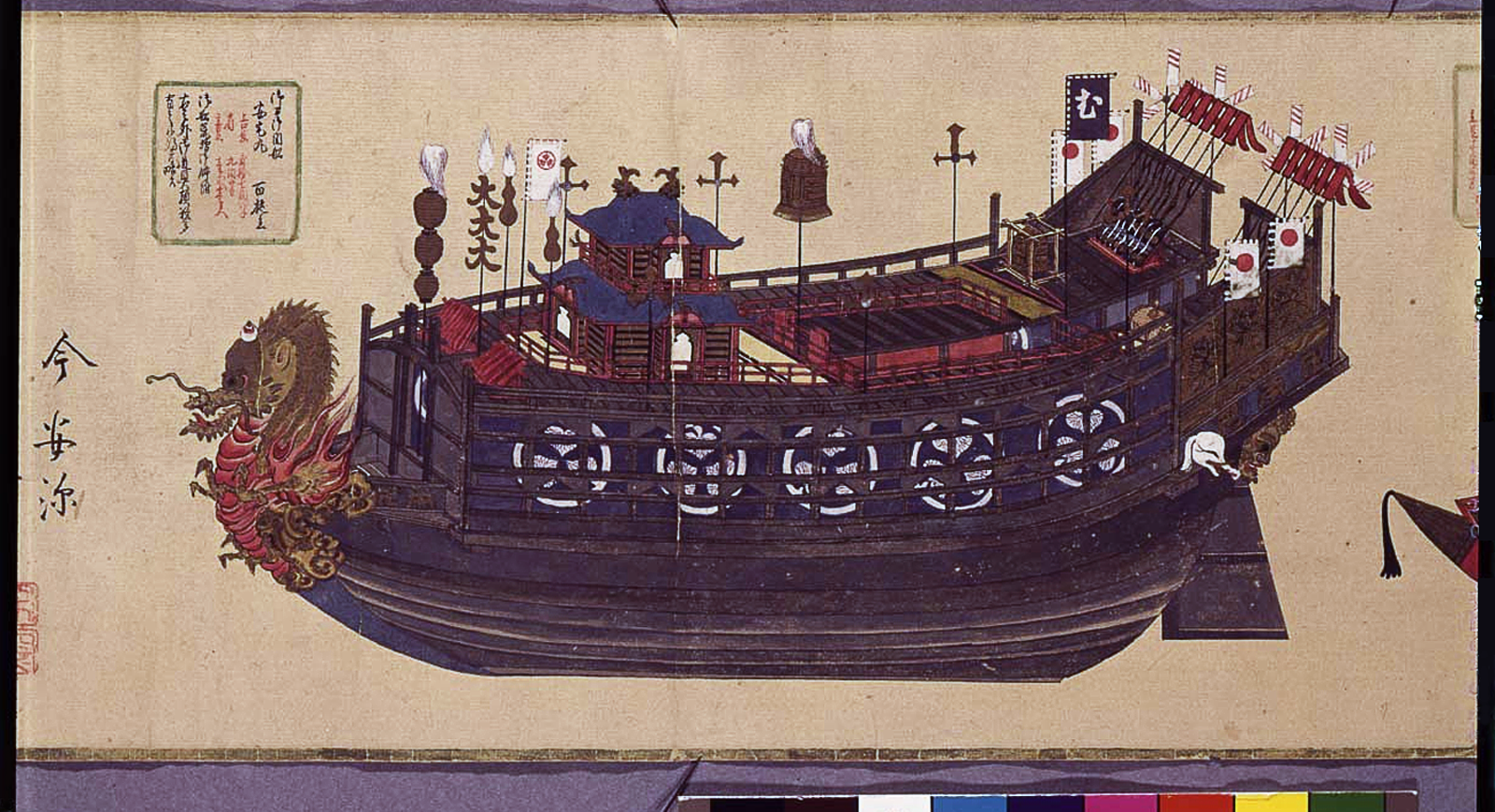
A 16th-century Japanese "Atakebune" coastal naval war vessel, bearing the symbol of the Tokugawa Clan.

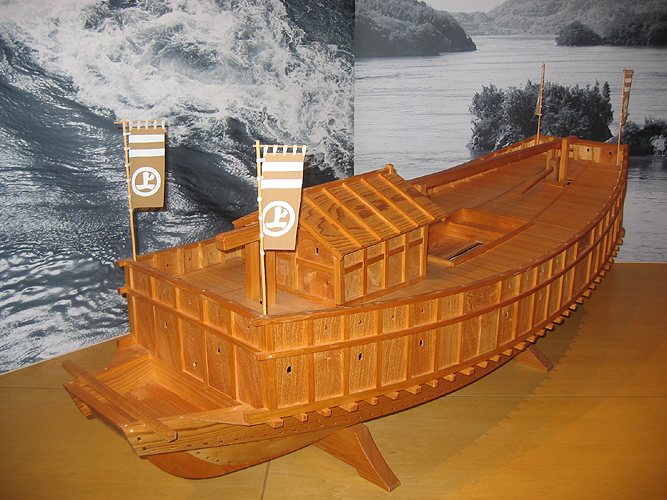
Murakami Navy's Atakebune model

Atakebune (安宅船) were Japanese warships of the 16th and 17th century used during the internecine Japanese wars for political control and unity of all Japan.

== History ==
Japan undertook major naval building efforts in the mid to late 16th century, during the Sengoku period, when feudal rulers vying for supremacy built vast coastal navies of several hundreds of ships. The largest (and generally most dangerous) of these ships were called atakebune. These vessels may be regarded as floating fortresses rather than true warships, and were only used in coastal actions. They used oars for propulsion, as their full iron cladding, if it existed, as well as their bulk (i.e. the armament and people they were carrying) likely impeded wind propulsion via sails.

Around that time, the Japanese daimyō Oda Nobunaga had made, according to the diary of the Abbot of the Tamon-I, six large iron-covered atakebune in 1578. These ships were called "Tekkōsen" (鉄甲船), literally meaning "iron ships", which is not to imply they were of iron, but that their superstructure may have been reinforced with iron plates against cannon and fire arrows. No iron covering was mentioned in the account of the Jesuit missionary Luís Fróis, who had also seen and described the ships.

However, in the letter from João Rodrigues to Luís Fróis in 1593, full iron-covered atakebune built by Toyotomi Hideyoshi were mentioned. Hideyoshi made those ships to invade Korea and their superstructure was fully covered by iron plates.

Kanpaku (Hideyoshi) commanded them to build several huge ships.Their structure above the surface is fully covered by iron, and there is tower on the deck. Bridges are covered by iron, and no wood is exposed. And whole parts are gilded very beautifully. These were worth admiring, I sometimes entered in the ships. I measured the length of one there, it was 19 jou (36.3 meter) long. These ships astonished several Portuguese who looked inside. However, these ships were frangible due to defective ribs. So some of them cleaved and sank.

The atakebune were armed with four at most (six if there were two smaller breech-loading swivel guns) cannons and numerous large-caliber arquebuses because it lacked the strength to withstand the recoil of cannon. The Oda defeated the Mori's navy with them at the mouth of the Kizu River, Osaka in 1578 in a successful naval blockade. These ships, the best of the atakebune, were used somewhat in contrast to Japanese naval tactics of the time, which viewed naval combat as a battle between the crews of ships, rather than between the ships themselves (which contributed to the primary Japanese naval tactic of drawing near and boarding opposing ships, as the Japanese crews excelled at hand-to-hand combat).

In the Japanese invasion of Korea the shortcomings of these ships became pronounced, as they proved to be no match for the superior build and firepower of the Korean navy's Panokseon ships, which could accommodate a far greater number of cannons due to their sturdier structure. The Koreans used this advantage to great effect, engaging the Japanese ships at long range with their numerous guns, thereby rendering ineffective the grappling tactics of the atakebune-based Japanese navy. Unlike smaller atakebune, however, the o-atakebune (giant atakebune) and flagship Nihon Maru demonstrated a surprising ability to withstand Korean fire during the Battle of Angolpo of August 1592, remaining in action and seaworthy despite heavy damage. Later atakebune of the Imjin War were thus designed similar to the Nihon War in an attempt to improve their effectiveness against the Korean warships.

"Atakemaru" (安宅丸), the large atakebune made by Mukai Shōgen Tadakatsu for Tokugawa Hidetada and Tokugawa Iemitsu was fully covered by copper plates.

== See also ==
- Ohama Kagetaka
- Turtle ship
- Djong
