= Battle of Omosu =

Japanese naval battle of 1580

Date	March 1580
Location	Suruga Bay, Izu Province 35°01′12″N 138°53′17″E
Result	Hōjō victory

Belligerents
Hōjō forces	Takeda forces

Commanders and leaders
Hōjō Ujimasa; Fūma Kotarō	Takeda Katsuyori; Ohama Kagetaka
- Location within Shizuoka Prefecture Battle of Omosu (Japan)

The 1580 battle of Omosu (重須の戦い, Omosu no Tatakai) was one of many battles fought between the Hōjō and Takeda clans during Japan's Sengoku period. It is distinguished, however, as one of the very few naval battles to be fought in pre-modern Japan.

The battle took place off the coast of the Izu Peninsula between the navies of Hōjō Ujimasa, the head of the Hōjō, and those of Takeda Katsuyori, the head of the Takeda.

The Fūma ninja led by Fūma Kotarō covertly infiltrated and attacked a camp of the Takeda clan forces at night, succeeding in causing severe chaos in the camp, which resulted in massive casualties among the disoriented enemies as they attacked each other.

Later, while the navies faced off, the land armies of each family advanced towards one another. In the end, the Hōjō were victorious.
