= Toba Castle =

- 鳥羽城
- Toba, Mie Prefecture, Japan
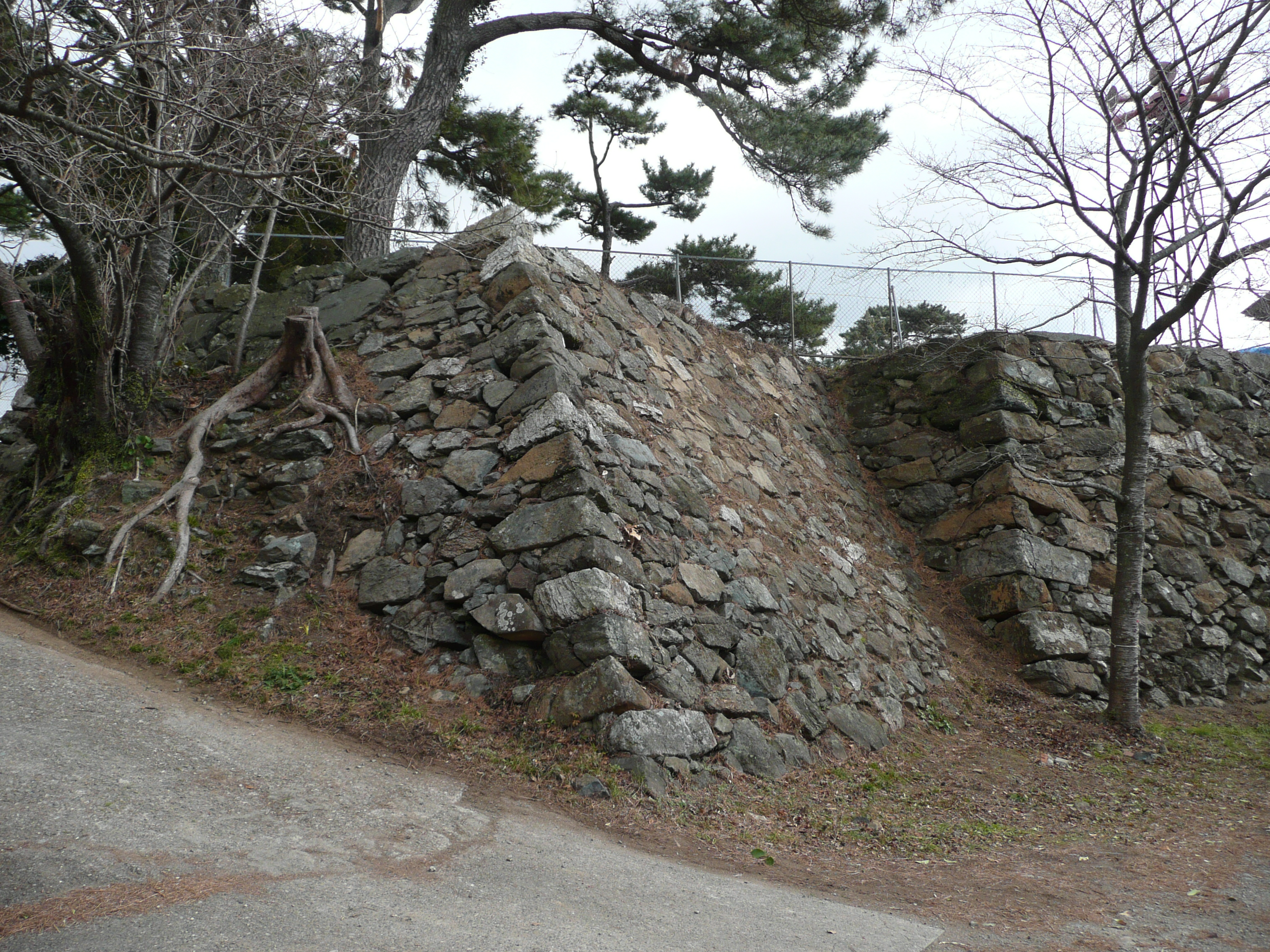
- Portion of the foundations of the Main Keep of Toba Castle

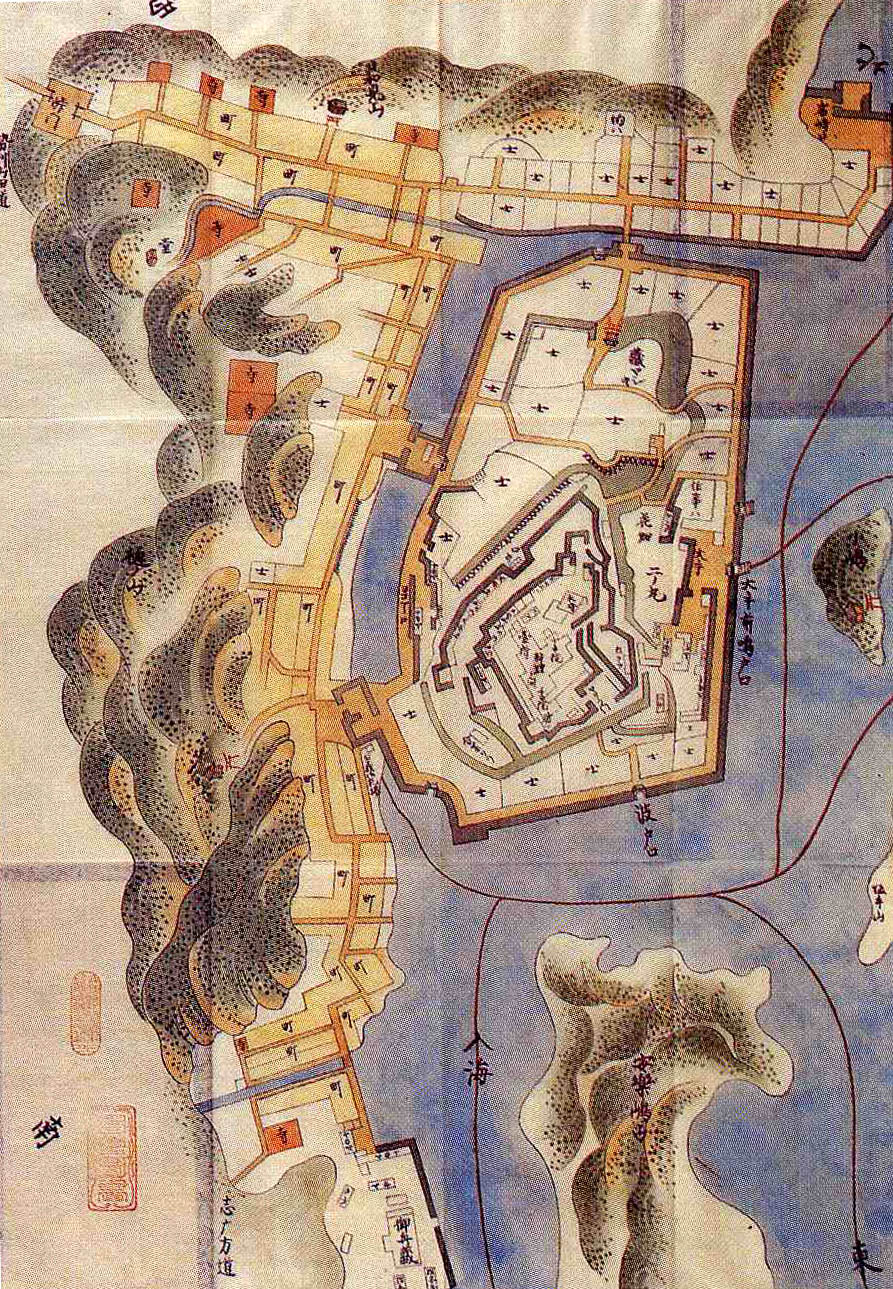
- Map of Toba Castle

Site information
- Type: flatland-style Japanese castle
- Open to the public: yes
- Condition: ruins

Location
- Coordinates: 34°28′50.98″N 136°50′40.38″E

Site history
- Built: 1594
- Built by: Kuki Yoshitaka
- In use: Edo period
- Demolished: 1871

Toba Castle (鳥羽城, Toba-jō) was a Japanese castle (now in ruins) located in the city of Toba, Mie Prefecture, Japan. Throughout the Edo period, Toba Castle was the administrative center for Toba Domain, a feudal domain of Shima Province under the Tokugawa shogunate. Toba Castle was also known as the Floating Castle of Toba (鳥羽の浮城, Toba-no-uki-jō) or the Two-color Castle (二色城, Nishoku-jō) (from the fact that its seaward side was painted black, and landward side painted white). The castle site received protection as a Mie Prefectural Historic Site in 1965.

== Location ==
Toba Castle is located on a hill on the coast of Ise Bay, near the center of modern Toba City, with its main gate facing the ocean. The castle occupied an area roughly 400 meters by 200 meters, with stone walls in the central area and a three-story tenshu built in 1633. A water moat completely separated the castle area from the mainland.

== History ==
The castle was constructed in 1594 by Kuki Yoshitaka, who commanded a force of Japanese pirates, who dominated the Ise Bay area in the Sengoku period. Kuki Yoshitaka was enlisted into the service of Oda Nobunaga in 1575 to assist him in crushing the Ikkō-ikki movement based at Nagashima. In return, Nobunaga allowed him to seize Shima Province, forcing out other maritime clans, such the Mukai clan, who went to Suruga Province to support Takeda Shingen and later Tokugawa Ieyasu. As Oda Nobunaga expanded westward, he came into conflict with the Mori clan of western Japan, and their maritime allies, the Murakami clan. The Kuki and Murakami navies fought in several engagements in Osaka Bay, eventually emerging victorious through their use of armored ships. Following the death of Nobunaga, the Kuki gave their fealty to Toyotomi Hideyoshi. However, after Hideyoshi's death, Kuki Yoshitaka continued to support the Toyotomi, whereas his son, Kuki Moritaka gave his fealty to Tokugawa Ieyasu. During Ieyasu's expedition against the Uesugi clan in Aizu, Kuki Yoshitaka seized the castle from his son with Toyotomi assistance. After the Battle of Sekigahara, he fled the castle and eventually committed seppuku. The Kuki clan continued to rule Toba until 1633, but by this time the shogunate no longer required a naval force, and they were replaced by a succession of fudai daimyō. Under Naito Tadashige the grounds were expanded by adding a second and third Bailey. The castle came into the possession of the Inagaki clan in 1725. The Inagaki ruled the 30,000 koku Toba Domain for eight generations until the Meiji restoration.

The castle suffered severe damage due to typhoons in 1792, 1800 and 1838. The tenshu was destroyed in 1854 during one of the Ansei great earthquakes and was not rebuilt. Following the Meiji restoration, the remaining structures of the castle were destroyed in 1871 by orders of the new Meiji government. The Ni-no-maru and San-no-maru enclosures were sold to private hands in 1875, leaving only the entral Honmaru, most of which is now occupied by the modern Toba City Hall, Toba City Elementary School, Shiroyama Park, and Toba Aquarium. The castle site is a 15-minute walk from the JR Central or Kintetsu Railway Toba Station.
