= Fūma Kotarō =

Ninja leader

Fūma Kotarō (Fifth) 風魔 小太郎
- Born: Sagami Province
- Died: 1603 Edo
- Allegiance: Hōjō clan
- Commands: Kanagawa Prefecture
- Battles / wars: Battle of Omosu (1580); Siege of Odawara (1590)

Fūma Kotarō (風魔 小太郎) was the name adopted by the leader of the ninja Fūma clan (風魔一党, Fūma-ittō) during the Sengoku era of feudal Japan. He was a retainer of the Later Hōjō clan. According to some records, his name was originally Kazama Kotarō (風間 小太郎).

== The Fūma clan and Fūma Kotarō ==
The clan was based in Kanagawa Prefecture, specializing in horseback guerrilla warfare and naval espionage. According to some sources, the family has roots in the 10th century when they served Taira no Masakado in his revolt against the Kyoto government. The use of the name started with the first leader (jonin) of the clan: originally surnamed "風間" (Fūma), with a different kanji, it was later changed to homophone 風魔. Each subsequent leader of the school adopted the same name as its founder, making it difficult to identify them individually. This school was in the service of the Hōjō clan of Odawara.

Fūma Kotarō was the fifth and the best known of the Fūma clan leaders. Born in Sagami Province (modern Kanagawa Prefecture) on an unknown date, he became notorious as the leader of a band of 200 Rappa "battle disrupters", divided into four groups: brigands, pirates, burglars and thieves. Kotarō served under Hōjō Ujimasa and Hōjō Ujinao. His biggest achievement came in 1580 at Battle of Omosu, when the Fūma ninja covertly infiltrated and attacked a camp of the Takeda clan forces under Takeda Katsuyori at night, succeeding in causing severe chaos in the camp, which resulted in massive casualties among the disoriented enemies as they attacked each other. Later in 1590, at Siege of Odawara, when Toyotomi Hideyoshi laid siege to Odawara Castle, which eventually fell, the Hōjō clan was forced to surrender.

When the Tokugawa shogunate came to power, the remnants of Fūma-ryū were reduced to a band of brigands operating in and around Edo. A popular but fictional story says that in 1596, Kotarō was responsible for the death of Hattori Hanzō, a famous ninja in the service of Tokugawa Ieyasu, who had tracked him down in the Inland Sea, but Kotarō has succeeded in luring him into a small channel, where a tide trapped the Tokugawa gunboats and his men then set fire to the channel with oil.

Kotarō was eventually caught by the Tokugawa shogunate's special law-enforcement force, guided by his rival and a former Takeda ninja Kōsaka Jinnai (高坂甚内), and executed through beheading by an order of Ieyasu in 1603.

== In folklore and popular culture ==
In a folk legend, he is often an inhuman figure: a supposedly part-oni monstrous giant (over 2 meters tall) with inverted eyes. In fiction portrayals, Fūma Kotarō is often depicted as Hattori Hanzō's arch-rival. As the name Fūma literally means "wind demon", Fūma Kotarō's depiction is frequently more flamboyant, fantastical, and sometimes even demonic. In contrast, Hanzō is usually rendered with a relatively subdued appearance.

Kotarō is a player character in the video game Onimusha 2: Samurai's Destiny.

His 18th-century descendant Fūma Kotarō Kaneyoshi is the hero's nemesis through most of the TV series The Samurai.

A fictional weapon called the Fūma shuriken is a large collapsible shuriken with four blades.

== See also ==
- Ishikawa Goemon
- Hattori Hanzo
