= Kuki Yoshitaka =

Japanese naval commander (1542–1600)

- 九鬼 嘉隆
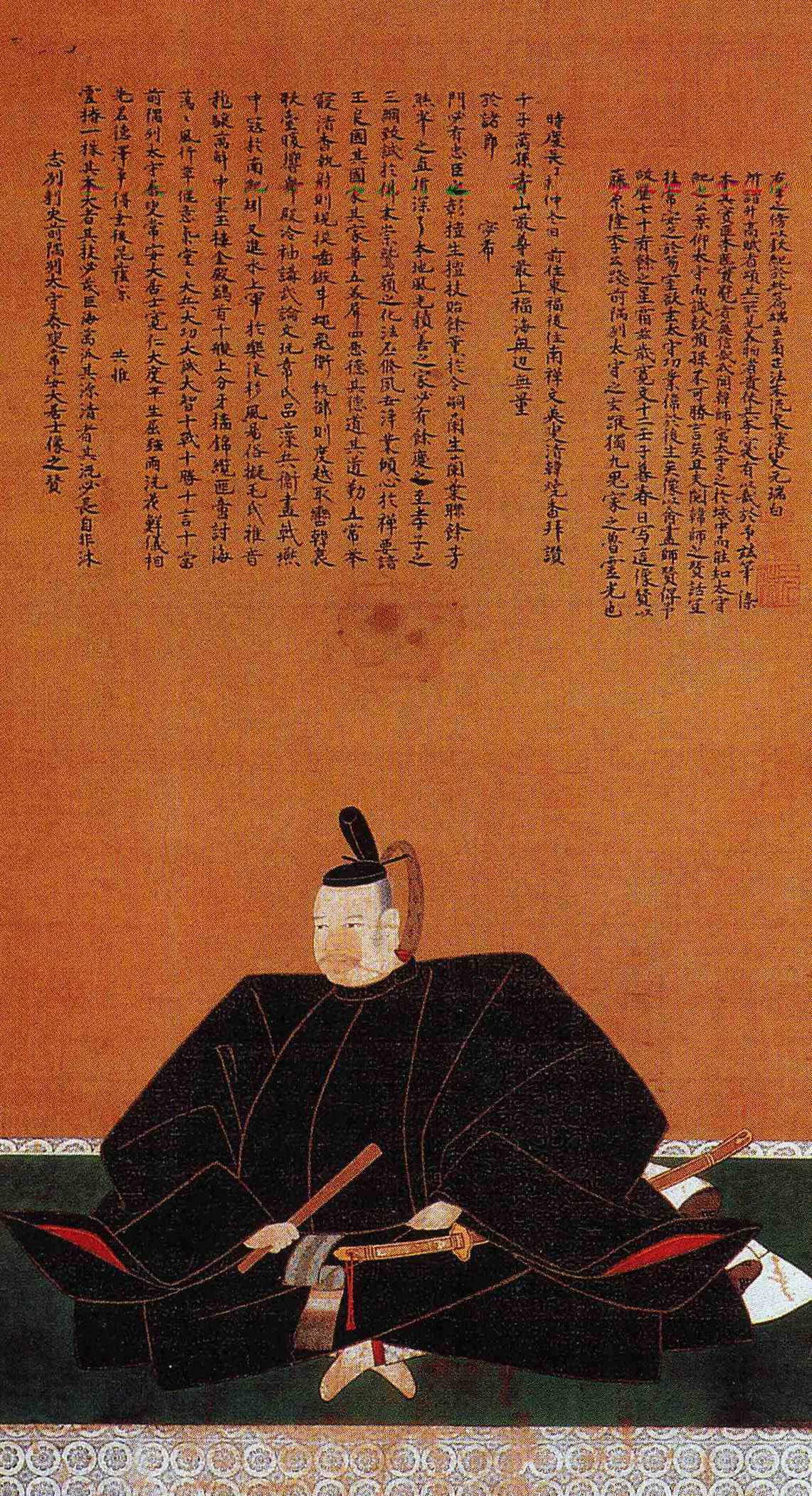

Lord of Toba Castle
- In office 1594–1600
- Preceded by: Kuki Moritaka

Personal details
- Born: 1542
- Died: November 17, 1600 (aged 57–58)
- Children: Kuki Moritaka

Military service
- Allegiance: Oda clan Toyotomi clan Western Army
- Rank: Fleet Commander
- Commands: Toba Castle
- Battles/wars: Siege of Nagashima; Shima Campaign; Battles of Kizugawaguchi; Siege of Kanie; Kyushu Campaign; Siege of Shimoda; Korean Campaign; Battle of Sekigahara

Kuki Yoshitaka (九鬼 嘉隆; 1542 – November 17, 1600) was a naval commander during Japan's Sengoku period, under Oda Nobunaga, and later, Toyotomi Hideyoshi. He was also the ninth headmaster of the Kuki family's school of martial arts, Kukishin-ryū.

In 1575, Kuki seized Shima Province, and served in the navy of Oda Nobunaga and Toyotomi Hideyoshi, earning a stipend of 35,000 koku. He was called a pirate daimyo by the military records of the Edo period. Later, he fought for the Western Army in the Battle of Sekigahara and committed suicide on the island of Tajima after being defeated.

== Military life ==
In the 1570s, Kuki allied himself with Oda Nobunaga, and commanded his fleet, supporting land-based attacks on the Ikkō-ikki at Ise Bay.

In 1574, his aid ensured a victory for Nobunaga in his third attempt to attack the Nagashima fortress.

In 1575, Nobunaga allowed Yoshitaka to seize Shima Province, forcing out other maritime clans, such the Mukai clan.

In 1576, he was defeated at Kizugawaguchi by the Mōri clan fleet, but in 1578, he won in the second Battle of Kizugawaguchi, in which Kuki used iron-armored ships, tekkōsen, to repel the arrows and musket balls of the opposing Mōri clan's ships.

In 1584, Yoshitaka along with Takigawa Kazumasu besieged Kanie castle, in Toyotomi Hideyoshi's campaign to consolidate his power over the lands held by the Oda clan in Owari province.

In 1587, he led Toyotomi Hideyoshi's fleet in a campaign in Kyūshū, alongside Konishi Yukinaga, Wakizaka Yasuharu and Katō Yoshiaki.

In 1590, along with Wakizaka Yasuharu and Kato Yoshiaki, he went on to lead the Siege of Shimoda in the Odawara campaign.

He continued in his role as commander of Hideyoshi's fleet, launching an invasion of Korea in 1592 from his flagship Nihon Maru, but he was severely defeated in the Battle of Myeongryang in 1597.

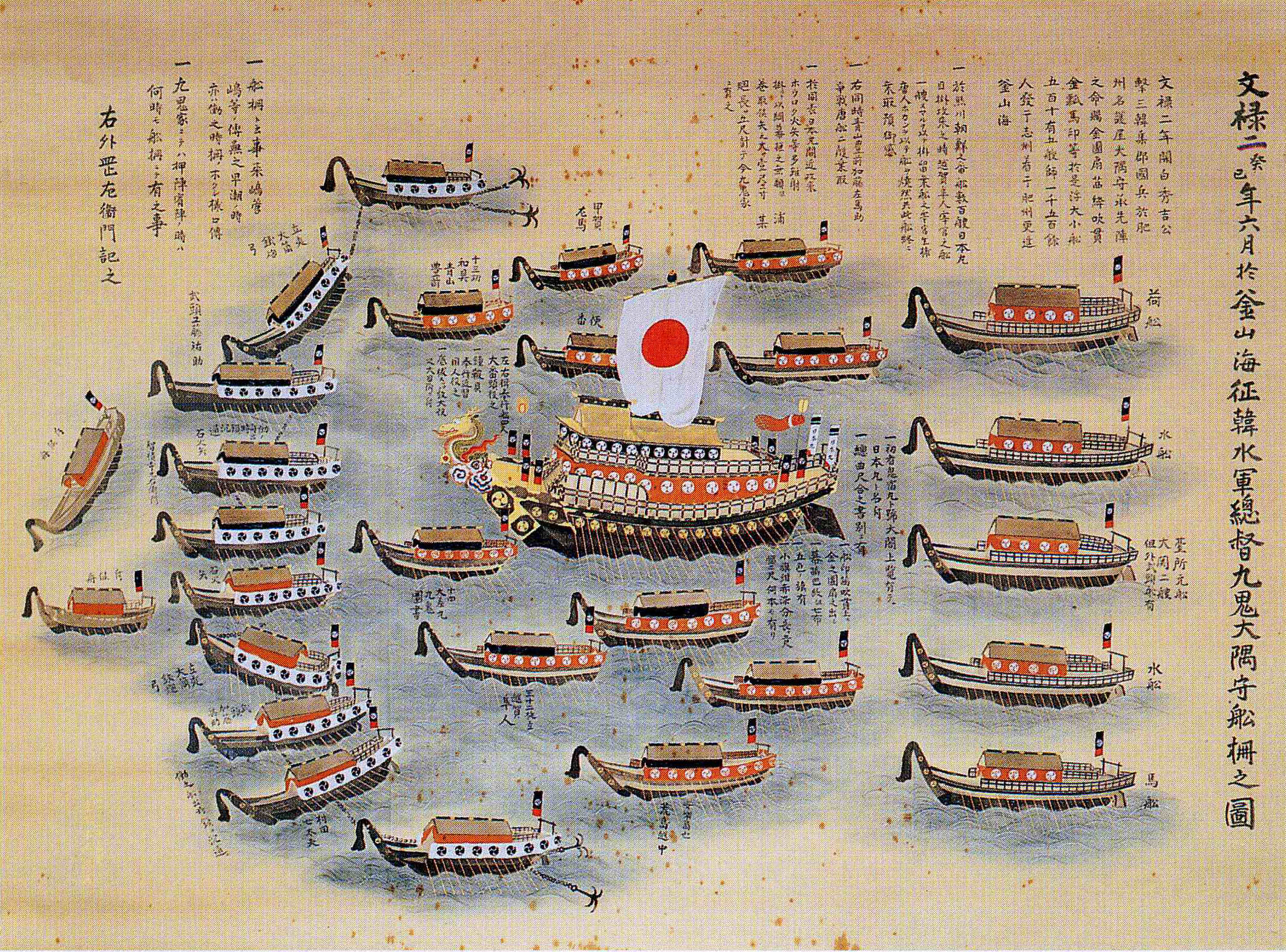
The fleet of Kuki Yoshitaka in 1593.

== Death ==
In 1600, during the Sekigahara campaign, in the Battle of Tsu Castle at October 1, the largest prelude to the Battle of Sekigahara in Ise Province, he served as a commander of the Western Army naval force. He blockaded the sea and prevented reinforcements from the Eastern Army, contributing to the fall of Tsu Castle. Yoshitaka also received reinforcement from the lord of Shingu Castle in Kii Province who also a son-in-law, Ujiyoshi Horiuchi. Together, they seized Toba Castle, which had been left behind by his son, Kuki Moritaka, who sided with the Eastern Army.

However, after the Battle of Sekigahara ended with a victory for the Eastern Army, Yoshitaka fled to Toshima Island and, at the urging of his vassal Toyoda Goroemon, committed suicide on November 17.

== See also ==
- Murakami Takeyoshi
- Ohama Kagetaka
