= Siege of Shimoda =

1590 siege in Shimoda, Shizuoka

- Part of the Sengoku period
Date	May – August 1590
Location	Shimoda fortress, Izu Province, Japan
Result	Siege succeeds; Toyotomi victory

Belligerents
forces of Toyotomi Hideyoshi	Hōjō clan forces

Commanders and leaders
Chōsokabe Motochika; Katō Yoshiaki; Kuki Yoshitaka; Ankokuji Ekei	Shimizu Yasuhide

Strength
14,000 men	600 men

Casualties and losses
Unknown	Unknown

The siege of Shimoda was a naval siege conducted against a coastal Hōjō fortress in Izu Province, part of Odawara Campaign.

This was concurrent with the larger Siege of Odawara (1590), and though the commanders of the besieging force were among Hideyoshi's greatest generals, they were held off by a mere 600 defenders for four months.
