= Ohama Kagetaka =

16th-century Japanese pirate

Ohama Kagetaka 小浜 景隆
- Born: c. 1540; Shima Province
- Died: 1597 (aged 56–57)
- Children: Ohama Mitsutaka
- Military career
- Allegiance: Kitabatake clan Takeda clan Tokugawa clan
- Rank: Fleet Commander
- Commands: Miura District, Kanagawa
- Conflicts: Battle of Omosu (1580); Battle of Komaki-Nagakute (1584)

Ohama Kagetaka (小浜景隆; c. 1540–1597) was a Japanese pirate during the latter part of the Sengoku period and the Azuchi–Momoyama period of Japan. He operated in the Shima Province area (now part of Mie Prefecture), and later commanded naval forces for both Takeda Shingen and Tokugawa Ieyasu before his death in 1597 at the age of 57.

== History ==
Ohama operated as a pirate chief in the area that is present-day Ohama-cho in Toba, Mie Prefecture. He held great power in the Ise Bay area as well as being very influential over the Kitabatake clan, which held the governorship of the Ise Province.

Ohama controlled the Kitabatake family's pirates and owned an atakebune, but was defeated by Kuki Yoshitaka, who had allied with Oda Nobunaga in his bid to unify Shima Province. Subsequently, Ise Bay was overrun.

In 1571, Kagetaka received an invitation from Tsuchiya Sadatsuna, a retainer of Takeda Shingen, to build a navy for the Takeda clan, He became an admiral with a fleet composed of one 'atakebune' and fifteen smaller vessels. After the demise of Shingen, Kagetaka served under Takeda Katsuyori in the Battle of Omosu against the Hojo clan.

In 1582, after the collapse of the Takeda clan, Kagetaka then served as an admiral for Tokugawa Ieyasu and was awarded a fief of 1,500 koku in Suruga Province. Thereafter, together with Mukai Masatsuna and Mamiya Takanori, he served under the command of Honda Shigetsugu in sea and land operations.

In 1584, at the Komaki-Nagakute campaign, he caused trouble at sea for the forces of Hashiba Hideyoshi.

In 1590, after the transfer of Ieyasu to the Kantō, Kagetaka was further awarded 3,000 koku in Sagami and Kazusa provinces. He was stationed in the village of Misaki in the Miura District, Kanagawa of Sagami Province at the entrance to Edo Bay.

Kagetaka became the chief of "the Misaki Group of Four", The Ohama clan, along with Mukai, Mamiya, and Chika clans. The residence of Kagetaka in Misaki was located on the remains of the residence of Nanjō Masaharu, the former lord of Misaki Castle and a retainer of Hōjō Ujichika.

Kagetaka died in 1597 at the age of fifty-eight. In the ninth month of 1600, his son, Mitsutaka, participated in the Battle of Sekigahara.

== See also ==
- Kuki Yoshitaka
- Murakami Takeyoshi
