= Arima Noriyori =

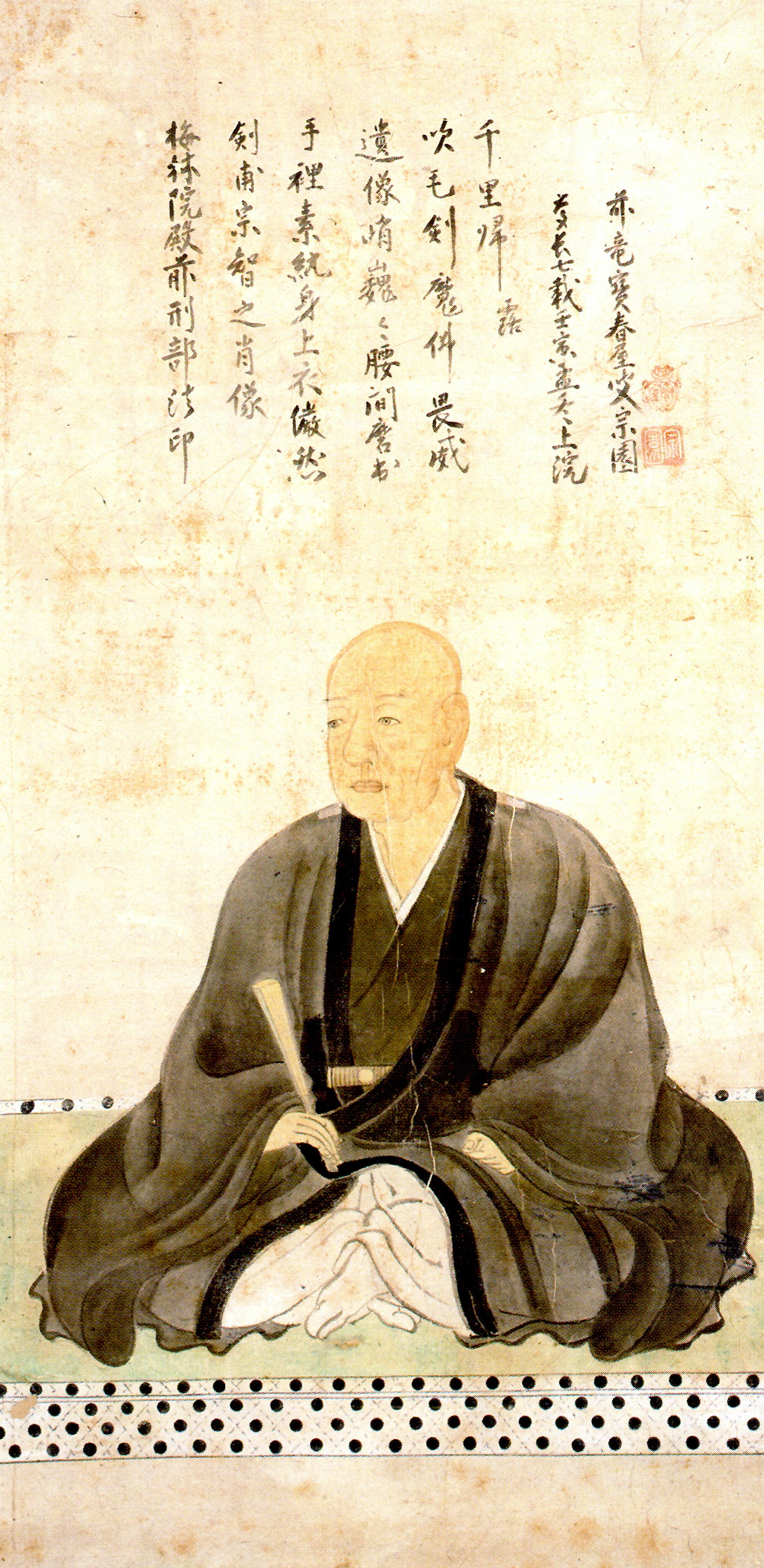
Arima Noriyori

Arima Noriyori (有馬則頼, 1533–1603) was a Japanese samurai lord who was the daimyo of Sanda Domain in Settsu Province. He served Toyotomi Hideyoshi, later Tokugawa Ieyasu and was a famous tea master.

== Biography ==
In 1580, at the behest of Oda Nobunaga, Hideyoshi attacked the Mōri clan who controlled the Chūgoku (central) region of Japan. Noriyori served Hideyoshi as a squadron leader in a successful campaign and was subsequently given a fief of 3,200 koku by Hideyoshi in Harima Province.

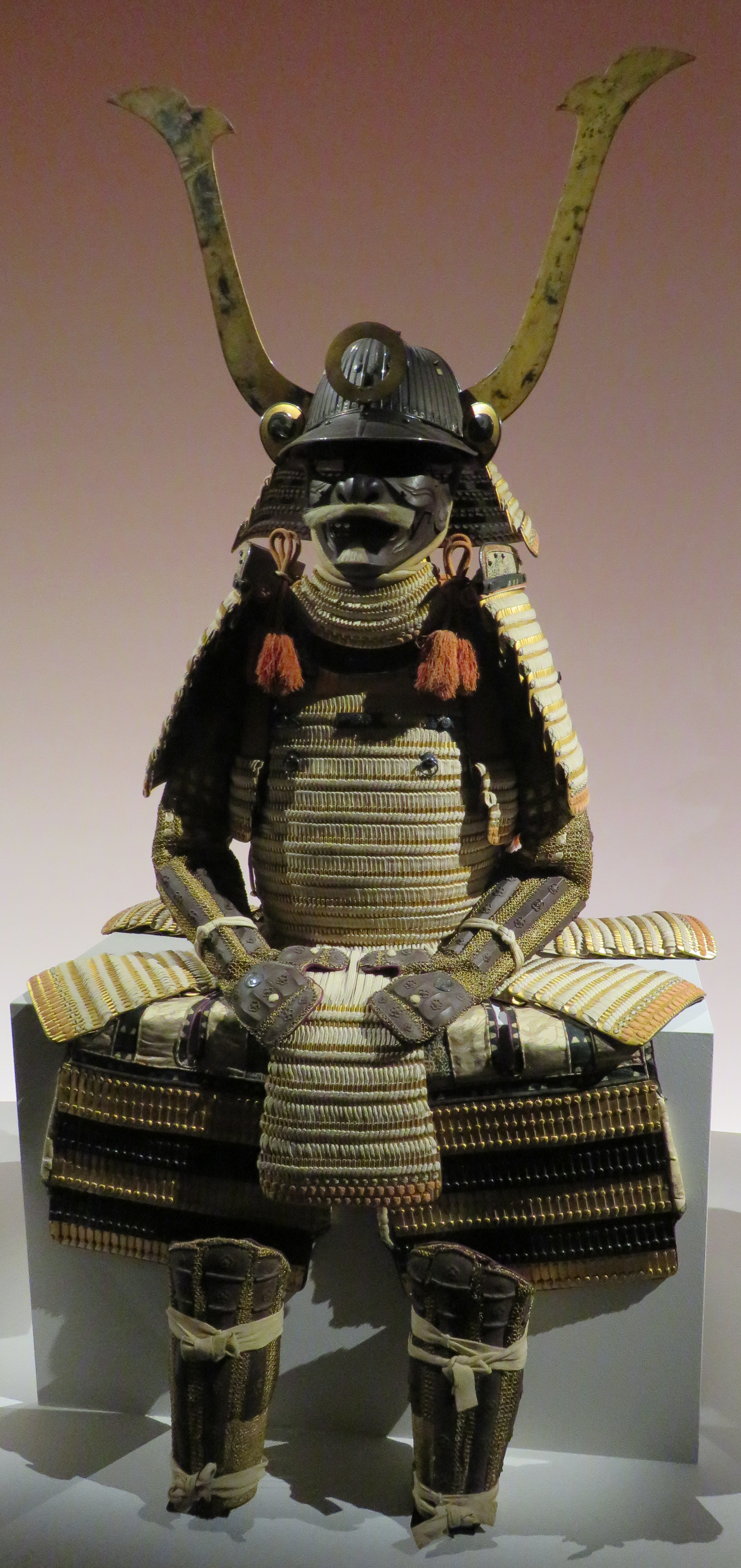
Armour Arima Noriyori - full

Noriyori served Hideyoshi in the Kyūshū Campaign of 1587 and again as guard of Hizen Nagoya Castle during the Korean Invasion of 1592 (Hizen Province controlled trade between Portugal and Japan). He was one of Hideyoshi’s Ohanashi-shū (advisers) and accompanied Hideyoshi and Sen Rikyū to Arima Onsen where he attended Rikyū’s tea gathering.

Noriyori was a well-regarded tea master in his own right and he appears in records of Rikyū’s tea gatherings. Hideyoshi frequented Noriyori’s tea gatherings and gave him famous teas wares (meibutsu) such as the Tsukumo Nasu chaire (tea caddy). The chaire was badly damaged in the Honnō-ji Incident but repaired and presented to Hideyoshi. Hideyoshi lost interest in the piece as its once brilliant glaze was charred in the fire. Hideyoshi decided to give Tsukumo to Noriyori. This is still a significant gesture as the chaire was formerly an esteemed piece in the Ashikaga Shōgun’s collection.

Noriyori sided with the East Army in the Battle of Sekigahara for his military exploits during the battle, Tokugawa Ieyasu awarded Noriyori the Sanda fief in Settsu Province along with the Beniya Katatsuki chaire (tea caddy).

Noriyori died at the age of 70 in Sanda on July 28, 1603 and was buried at Tensho-ji Temple, Ogo.
