= Nihon Maru =

Japanese navy's flagship

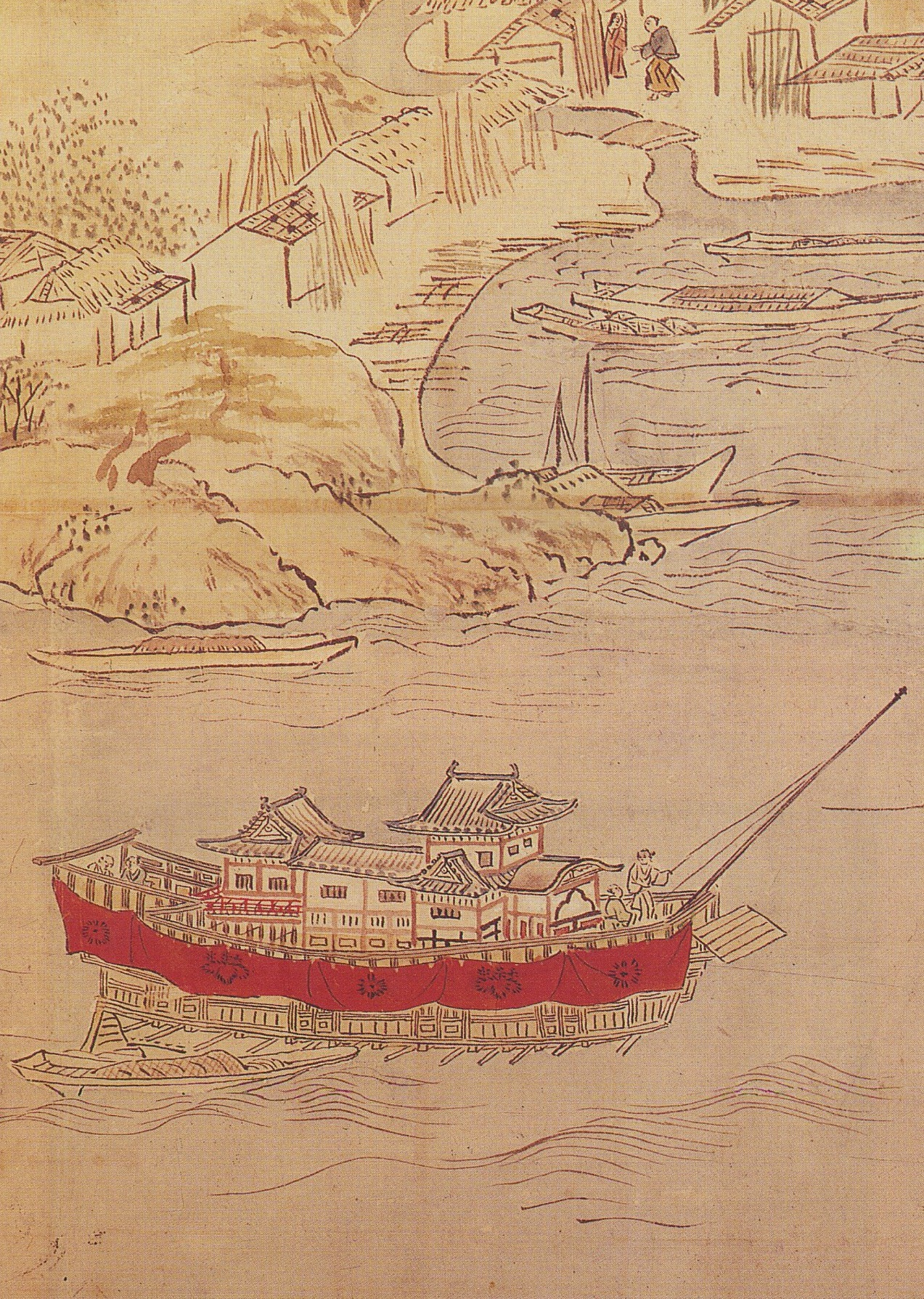
- Painting of an atakebune held at Saga Prefectural Nagoya Castle Museum. According to historian Yuhan Kim, this painting is speculated to depict the Nihon Maru, though another ship on the painting (not shown here) may also show the vessel.

History

Japan
- Name: Nihon Maru
- Namesake: Japan
- Owner: Toyotomi Hideyoshi
- Operator: Fleet of Toyotomi Hideyoshi
- Ordered: 1591
- Builder: Kuki Yoshitaka
- Laid down: 1591
- In service: 1591–1856
- Renamed: Tairyu Maru (after 1598)
- Fate: Broken up in 1856

General characteristics
- Class & type: O-atakebune
- Propulsion: Row- and sailboat

Nihon Maru, less commonly transliterated Nippon Maru and later renamed Tairyu Maru, was the personal ship of Toyotomi Hideyoshi and served as the Japanese navy's flagship during the Imjin War (1592–1598).

== History ==
The Nihon Maru was built by Kuki Yoshitaka in 1591 specifically to serve as the personal flagship of Japanese regent (Kampaku) Toyotomi Hideyoshi. According to historian Stephen Turnbull, the ship's name was designed to reflect Toyotomi's ambition for "Japan to rule the world" and showcased a kind of individuality which other Japanese ships of the time lacked. It was one of the largest Japanese vessels built during this period, belonging to the o-atakebune (giant atakebune) class. Possibly, it was originally intended to serve as Toyotomi's goza bune (entertainment ship) or his private yacht, as the ship was lavishly decorated and used by Toyotomi to impress visitors.

Like many other ships, both miliary and civilian ones, the Nihon Maru was drafted into the Japanese navy for Toyotomi's invasion of Joseon Korea –the Imjin War– in 1592. In August 1592, Kuki Yoshitaka used the Nihon Maru as his flagship during the Battle of Angolpo. At Angolpo, the Nihon Maru and a large Japanese fleet were cornered by a better-armed Joseon Navy fleet under Admiral Yi Sun-sin. As a result of its size, the ship was heavily engaged by the Koreans, being bombarded with fire arrows as well as cannon. It suffered considerable damage, but the Nihon Maru's protective brocade proved to be fairly effective. The ship's crew constantly soaked the protective curtains and bags at the ship's sides, thereby preventing an outbreak of fire, while carrying out ad-hoc repairs during the entire battle. When the Koreans finally retreated at the onset of the night, Kuki discovered to his "astonishment" that the Nihon Maru remained seaworthy due to its crew's efforts. The flagship and 21 other Japanese ships subsequently used the darkness to escape the Joseon encirclement, with Kuki successfully leading the survivors back to Japanese-occupied Busan.

After Battle of Angolpo, Kuki personally delivered a report of the clash to Toyotomi Hideyoshi who expressed happiness at the Nihon Maru's survival. (Note: Kuki also took a "souvenir" from Angolpo to Japan, namely a Korean daejanggunjeon (large rocket-shaped arrow) which had been recovered from the Nihon Maru after the battle. This daejanggunjeon remains in the possession of the Kuki family to the present day, being the only surviving example of its kind from the Imjin War.) As a result of its good performance at Angolpo, the Nihon Maru served as template for Japanese ship designs during the Imjin War's next years.

The Nihon Maru survived the entire Imjin War and was brought to Toba for improvements and refitting. Renamed Tairyu Maru, the ship reportedly remained in Toba until 1856, when it was broken up due to the advanced state of its decay.

== Design ==
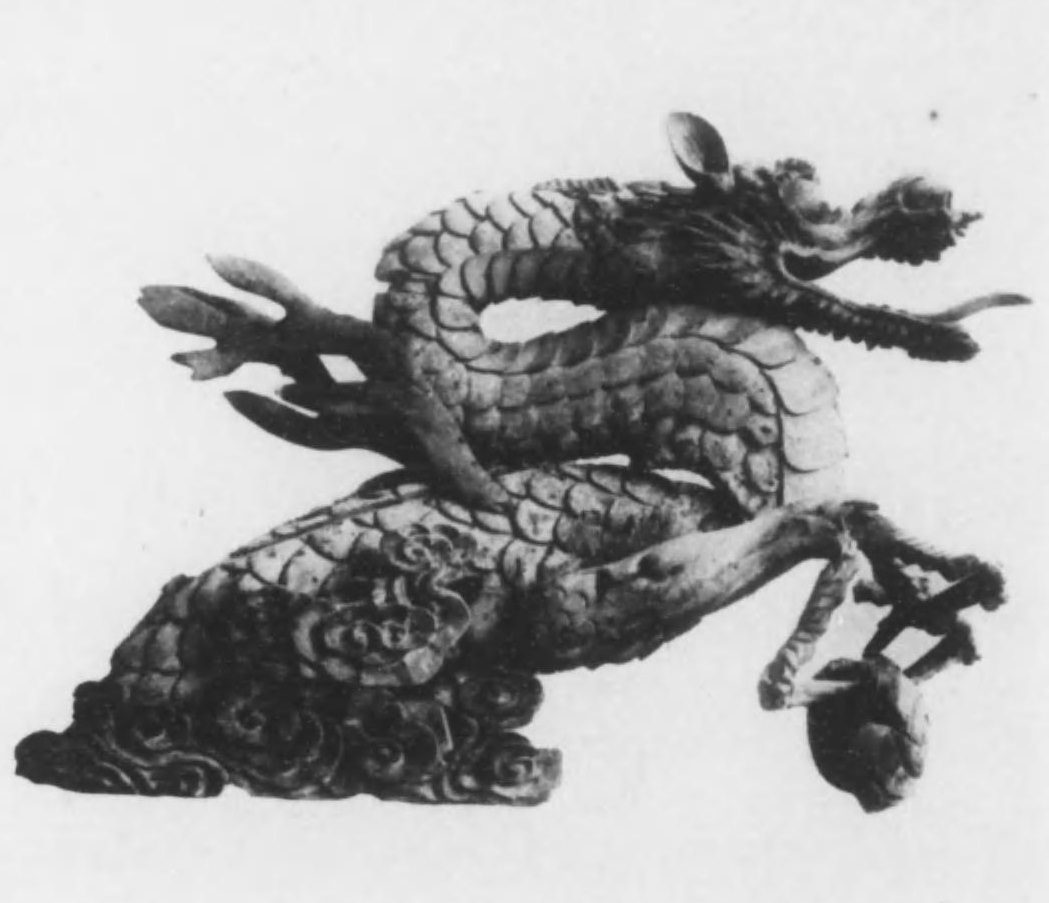
Photo of the Nihon Maru dragon figurehead in 1941.

The Nihon Maru was an o-atakebune or giant atakebune. It possessed a three-story superstructure resembling a Japanese castle, consisting of three 18-mat rooms with white-washed walls under a curved roof. At Angolpo, the Nihon Maru was decorated with a Mount Horai Shinto religious symbol and a brocade curtain; these were decorative but also helped to protect the vessel from Joseon projectiles. Furthermore, the crew outfitted the ship with wet bags of straw and blankets to bolster the protection against fire attacks.

The Nihon Maru had a carved dragon figurehead which was initially preserved after the ship's scrapping. The figurehead was destroyed during a United States air raid in 1945.
