= Katō Yoshiaki =

Japanese daimyo

Junior Third Rank Katō Yoshiaki
- 加藤 嘉明
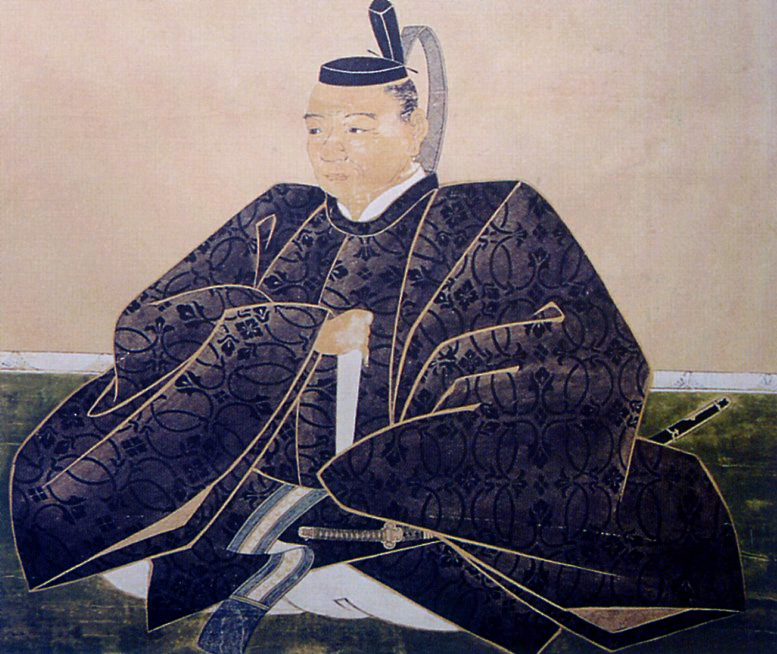

Lord of Aizu
- In office 1627–1631
- Preceded by: Gamō Tadasato
- Succeeded by: Katō Akinari

Personal details
- Born: 1563
- Died: October 7, 1631 (aged 67–68) Edo, Japan

Military service
- Allegiance: Toyotomi clan Eastern Army; Tokugawa shogunate
- Unit: Katō clan
- Battles/wars: Battle of Shizugatake (1583); Siege of Shimoda (1590); Korean Campaign (1592-1598); Battle of Sekigahara (1600)

Katō Yoshiaki(ra) (加藤 嘉明; Japanese pronunciation: [kaꜜ.toː | jo.ɕi.aꜜ.kʲi.ɾa], 1563 – October 7, 1631) was a Japanese daimyō of the late Sengoku period to early Edo period; he served as lord of the Aizu Domain.

As a retainer of Toyotomi Hideyoshi, Katō fought in the battle of Shizugatake in 1583 and soon became known as one of the shichi-hon-yari (七本槍), or Seven Spears of Shizugatake. He was also one of Hideyoshi's seven most trusted and experienced generals. He was additionally involved in the naval battles at Siege of Shimoda in the Odawara Campaign (1590) and fought along the coast of southern Korean peninsula during the first and second Korean Campaigns.

== Conflict with Ishida Mitsunari ==
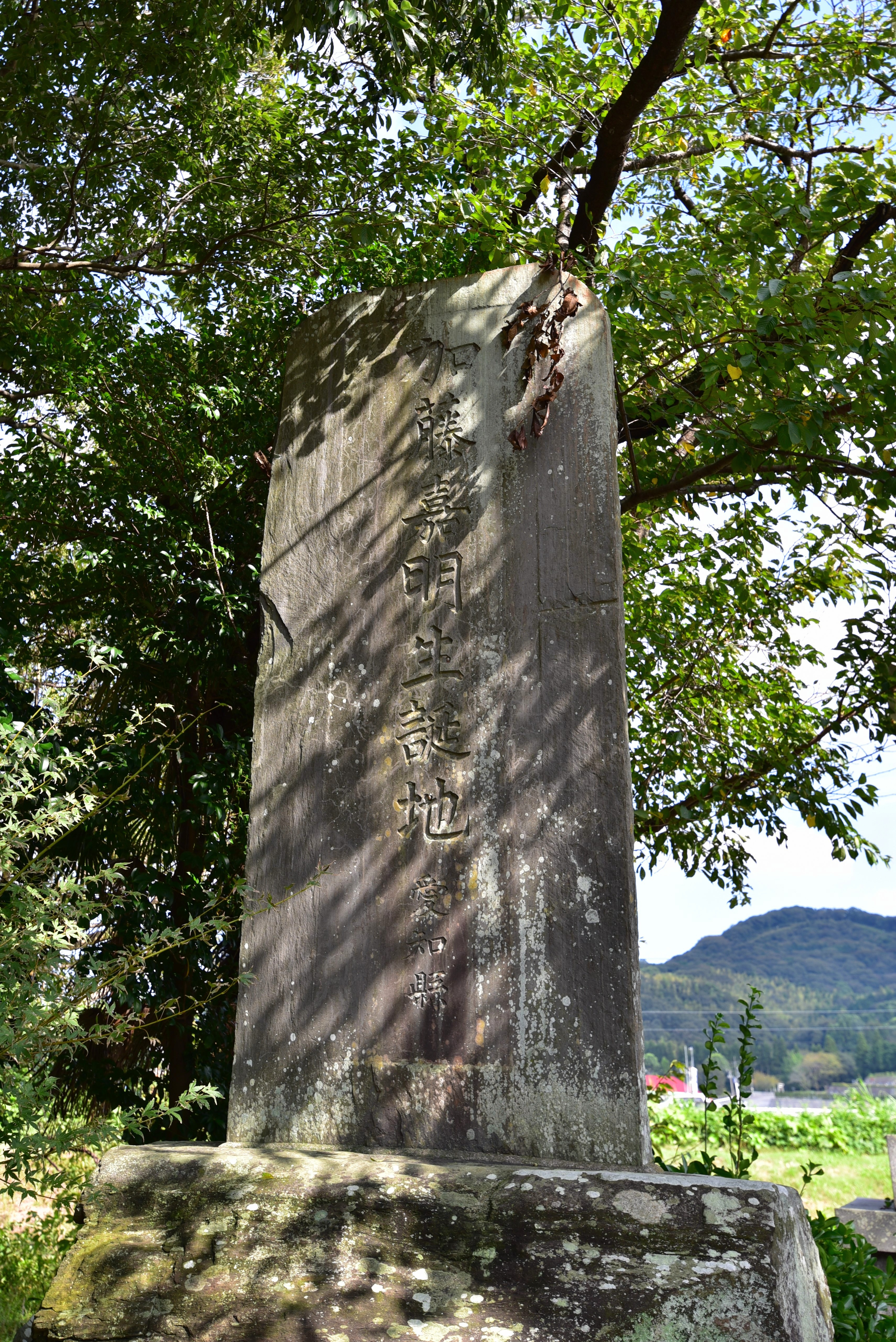
Katō Yoshiaki's birthplace monument (Nishio, Aichi Prefecture)

A popular theory asserts that after the death of Toyotomi Hideyoshi in 1598, the government of Japan had an accident when seven military generals—Fukushima Masanori, Katō Kiyomasa, Ikeda Terumasa, Hosokawa Tadaoki, Asano Yoshinaga, Kuroda Nagamasa, and Katō Yoshiaki—planned a conspiracy to kill Ishida Mitsunari. Some have claimed that the reason for the conspiracy was dissatisfaction toward Ishida Mitsunari for writing bad assessments and underreporting the achievements of the seven generals during the Imjin War.

The seven generals gathered at Katō Kiyomasa's mansion in Osaka Castle; from there they moved into Ishida Mitsunari's mansion. However, Ishida Mitsunari learned of this through a report from Toyotomi Hideyori's servant Jiemon Kuwajima, after which he fled to Satake Yoshinobu's mansion with Shima Sakon and others to hide. When the seven generals found out that Ishida Mitsunari wasn't in his mansion, they searched the mansions of various feudal lords in Osaka Castle; eventually, Katō Yoshiaki approached Satake Yoshinobu's residence, during which Ishida Mitsunari and his party escaped from the Satake residence and barricaded themselves at Fushimi Castle.

The next day, the seven generals surrounded Fushimi Castle with their soldiers, as they knew of Ishida Mitsunari's whereabouts. Tokugawa Ieyasu, who was in charge of political affairs in Fushimi Castle, tried to arbitrate the situation. The seven generals demanded that Tokugawa Ieyasu hand over Ishida Mitsunari, but he refused. Tokugawa Ieyasu then negotiated that Ishida Mitsunari review the assessment of the Battle of Ulsan Castle in Korea (which had been a major source of this incident); Tokugawa Ieyasu also had his second son, Yūki Hideyasu, escort Ishida Mitsunari to Sawayama Castle.

Historian Watanabe Daimon stated that the incident was more of legal conflict between the seven generals and Ishida Mitsunari rather than conspiracy to murder him, in which case Tokugawa Ieyasu's role was not physical protection but rather mediation of complaints. Nevertheless, other historians saw the incident as an extension of the political rivalries of greater scope between the Tokugawa faction and the anti-Tokugawa faction led by Ishida Mitsunari. After the incident, the seven generals would go on to support Tokugawa Ieyasu during his conflict with the Western army led by Ishida Mitsunari, known later as the 1600 Battle of Sekigahara. (In that battle, Katō fought alongside Tokugawa Ieyasu, after which Katō Yoshiaki's fief was doubled from 100,000 koku to 200,000. For a time, he served lord of Aizu.) Muramatsu Shunkichi argued that the reason of Ishida Mitsunari's failure in his war against Tokugawa Ieyasu was due to his unpopularity among the major political figures of that time.

In 1917, he was posthumously granted the courtesy title of junior third rank (ju san-mi, 従三位) by Emperor Taishō.

== See also ==
- Katō Kiyomasa
- Siege of Shimoda

== Popular culture ==
- Portrayed by Kim Kang-il in the 2014 film, The Admiral: Roaring Currents.
- Portrayed by Kim Sung-kyun in the 2022 film, Hansan: Rising Dragon.
