= Kuki Moritaka =

Kuki Moritaka (九鬼 守隆; 1573 - October 28, 1632) was a general and admiral in the service of Tokugawa Ieyasu, and the son of Kuki Yoshitaka, one of Toyotomi Hideyoshi's top generals.

In the last years of the 16th century, Kuki Moritaka supported Tokugawa Ieyasu in his bid for power, while his father fought for the opposing side, supporting Ishida Mitsunari. After Tokugawa's victory, Moritaka was confirmed in lordship of his family's han (fief), which was raised from 26,000 koku to 46,000 in wealth and power. Afterwards, Moritaka remained a loyal general to the Tokugawa, commanding a fleet in the siege of Osaka in 1614–1615.
