= Kobe earthquake =

Earthquake in Japan on January 17, 1995

Great Hanshin earthquake
- 兵庫県南部地震, Hyōgo-ken nanbu jishin 阪神・淡路大震災, Hanshin-Awaji daishinsai
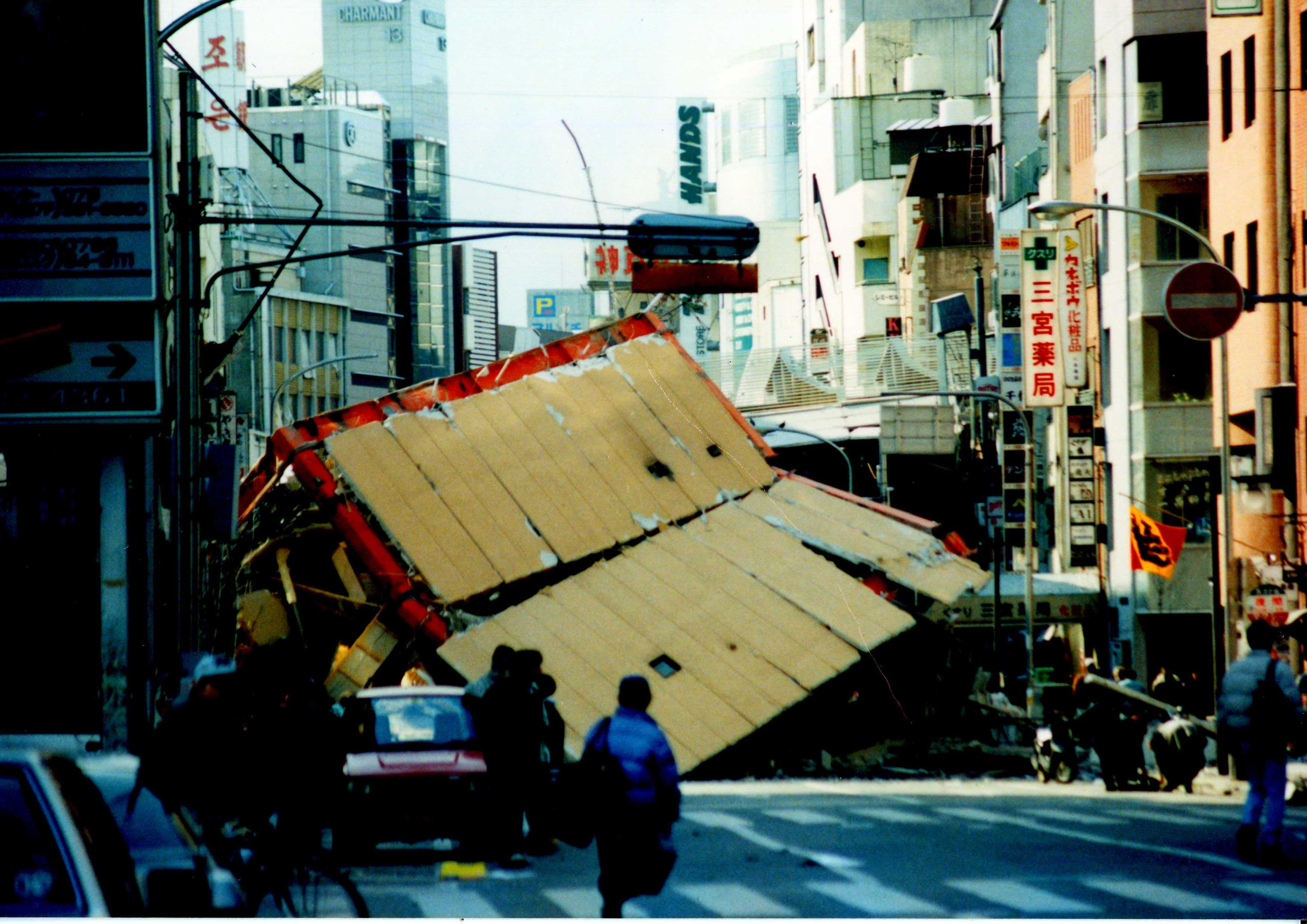
- Damage in Sannomiya

- UTC time: 1995-01-16 20:46:53
- ISC event: 124708
- USGS-ANSS: ComCat
- Local date: January 17, 1995
- Local time: 05:46:53 JST
- Duration: ~20 seconds
- Magnitude: 7.3 M_{JMA} 6.9 M_{w}
- Depth: 17.6 km (10.9 mi)
- Epicenter: 34.59°N 135.07°E
- Fault: Nojima
- Type: Strike-slip
- Areas affected: Japan
- Total damage: US$200 billion (equivalent to $422.6 billion in 2025)
- Max. intensity: JMA 7 (MMI XI)
- Peak acceleration: 0.91 g 891 gal
- Peak velocity: ~175 cm/s
- Casualties: 5,502–6,434 dead 36,896–43,792 injured 251,301–310,000 displaced

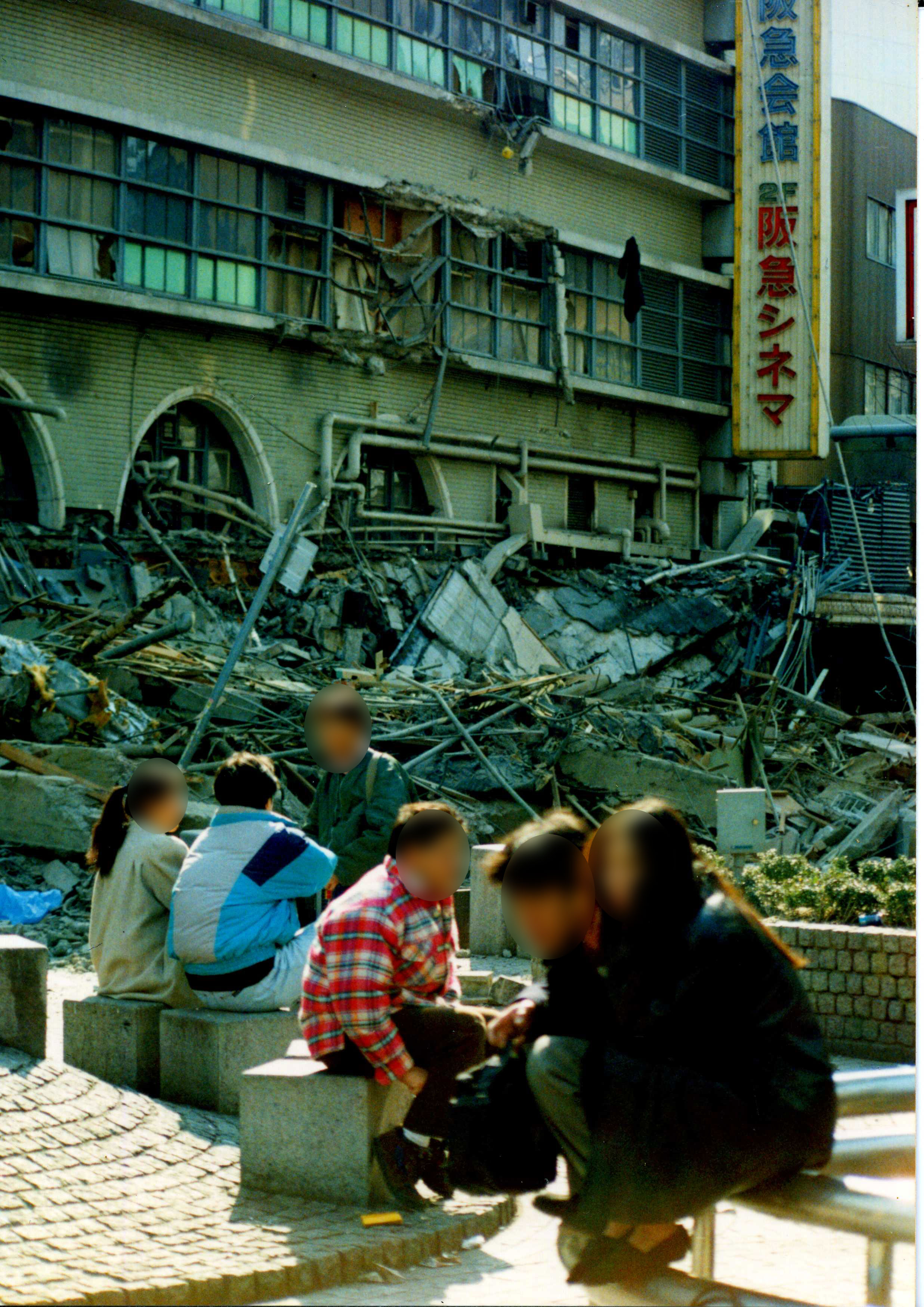
The North Exit of Hankyu Sannomiya Station and the Disaster Victims

The Kobe earthquake, also known as the Great Hanshin Earthquake (Japanese: 阪神淡路大震災, Hepburn: Hanshin-Awaji daishinsai), occurred on January 17, 1995, at 05:46:53 JST in the southern part of Hyōgo Prefecture, Japan, including the region of Hanshin. It measured 6.9 on the moment magnitude scale and had a maximum intensity of 7 on the JMA Seismic Intensity Scale (XI on the Modified Mercalli intensity scale). The tremors lasted for approximately 20 seconds. The hypocenter of the earthquake was located 17 km beneath its epicenter, on the northern end of Awaji Island, 20 km away from the center of the city of Kobe.

At least 5,000 people died, around 4,600 of them from Kobe. Kobe, with its population of 1.5 million, was the closest major city to the epicenter and hit by the strongest tremors. It was Japan's second deadliest earthquake in the 20th century after the 1923 Great Kantō earthquake, in which more than 105,000 people died.

== Earthquake ==
Red lines marked the highest Level 7 on the intensity scale. Area shaded purple is Kobe.

Most of the largest earthquakes in Japan are caused by subduction of the Philippine Sea plate or Pacific plate, with mechanisms that involve either energy released within the subducting plate or the accumulation and sudden release of stress in the overlying plate. Earthquakes of these types are especially frequent in the coastal regions of northeastern Japan.

The Great Hanshin earthquake belonged to a third type, called an "inland shallow earthquake". Earthquakes of this type occur along active faults. Even at lower magnitudes, they can be very destructive because they often occur near populated areas and because their hypocenters are located less than 20 km below the surface. The Great Hanshin earthquake began north of the island of Awaji, which lies just south of Kobe. It spread toward the southwest along the Nojima Fault on Awaji and toward the northeast along the Suma and Suwayama faults, which run through the center of Kobe. Observations of deformations in these faults suggest that the area was subjected to east–west compression, which is consistent with previously known crustal movements. Like other earthquakes recorded in western Japan between 1891 and 1948, the 1995 earthquake had a strike-slip mechanism that accommodated east–west shortening of the Eurasian plate due to its collision with the Philippine Sea plate in central Honshu.

The Mj 7.3 earthquake struck at 05:46:53 JST on the morning of January 17, 1995. It lasted for 20 seconds. During this time the south side of the Nojima Fault moved 1.5 meters to the right and 1.2 meters downwards. There were four foreshocks, beginning with the largest (Mj 3.7) at 18:28 on the previous day.

=== Intensity ===
It was the first time that an earthquake in Japan was officially measured at a seismic intensity (shindo in Japanese) of the highest Level 7 on the scale of Japan Meteorological Agency (JMA). After the earthquake, seismic intensity observation in Japan was fully mechanized (from April 1996) and JMA seismic intensity Levels 5 and 6 were each divided into 2 levels (from October 1996).

An on-the spot investigation by JMA concluded that tremors by this earthquake were at seismic intensity of Level 7 in particular areas in northern Awaji Island (now Awaji City) and in the cities of Kobe, Ashiya, Nishinomiya and Takarazuka.

Tremors were valued at seismic intensity of Levels 4 to 6 at observation points in Kansai, Chūgoku, Shikoku and Chūbu regions:

Seismic intensity at the seismic intensity observation point of the Japan Meteorological Agency
Intensity	Location
JMA 6	the cities of Sumoto (in Awaji Island) and Kobe (both in Hyōgo Prefecture)
JMA 5	the cities of Toyooka (in Hyōgo Prefecture), Hikone (in Shiga Prefecture) and Kyoto
JMA 4	the prefectures of Hyōgo, Shiga, Kyoto, Fukui, Gifu, Mie, Osaka, Nara, Wakayama, Tottori, Okayama, Hiroshima, Tokushima, Kagawa and Kōchi

Seismic intensity determined by field survey
Intensity	Prefecture	Location	Map
JMA 7	Hyōgo	Kobe (Higashinada, Nada, Chuo, Hyogo, Nagata, Suma), Nishinomiya, Ashiya, Takarazuka, Tsuna, Hokudan, Ichinomiya	Area of seismic intensity 7 (震度7)
JMA 6	Osaka	Osaka (Nishiyodogawa), Toyonaka, Ikeda	Area of seismic intensity 7 (震度7)
JMA 6	Hyōgo	Kobe (Tarumi, Kita, Nishi), Amagasaki, Akashi, Itami, Kawanishi, Awaji, Higashiura, Goshiki	Area of seismic intensity 7 (震度7)

=== Damage ===
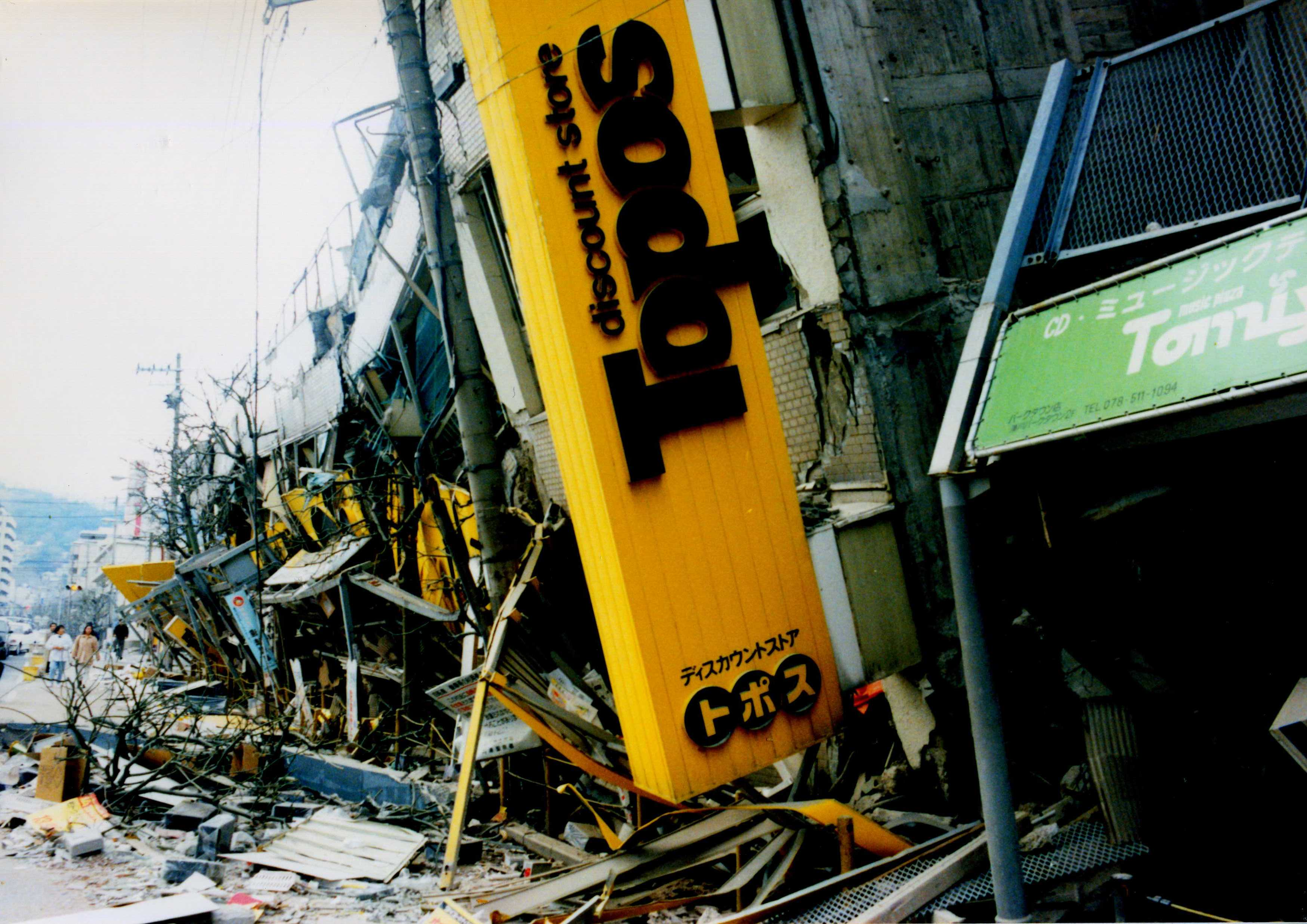
Damage at Minatogawa, Kobe

Damage was widespread and severe. Structures irreparably damaged by the earthquake included nearly 400,000 buildings, numerous elevated road and rail bridges, and 120 of the 150 quays in the port of Kobe. The quake triggered approximately 300 fires, which raged over large portions of the city. Disruptions of water, electricity and gas supplies were common. Residents feared returning home because of aftershocks that lasted several days (74 of which were strong enough to be felt).

The majority of deaths (over 4,000) occurred in cities and suburbs in Hyōgo Prefecture. A total of 68 children under the age of 18 were orphaned, while 332 children lost one parent.

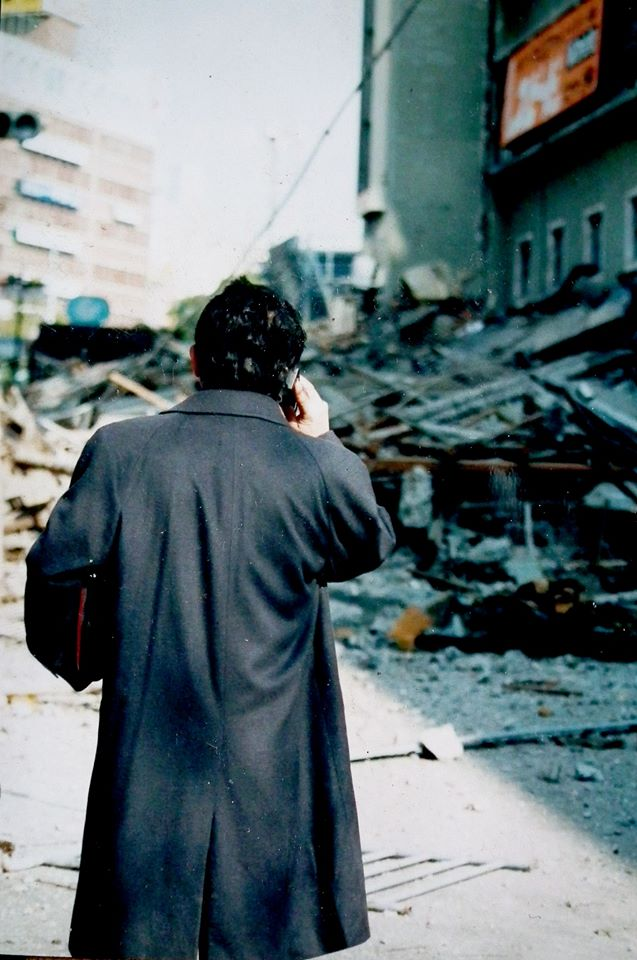
A man uses his mobile phone to report the disaster situation north of Sannomiya Station.

One in five of the buildings in the worst-hit areas were completely destroyed or rendered uninhabitable. About 22% of the offices in Kobe's central business district were rendered unusable, and over half of the houses in that area were deemed unfit for occupancy. Although some were destroyed and others suffered severe damage, high-rise buildings that were built in compliance with the 1981 building code suffered to a lesser extent. Those that were not constructed to these standards suffered serious structural damage, such as traditional houses which had heavy tiled roofs that could weigh as much as two tons, intended to resist the frequent typhoons plaguing Kobe, but were only supported by a light wooden frame. When these wood supports gave way, the roof would crush the unreinforced walls and floors in a pancake collapse. Newer homes have reinforced walls and lighter roofs to avoid this, but are thus more susceptible to typhoons.

The damage to highways and subways was the most graphic image of the earthquake, and images of the collapsed elevated Kobe Route of the Hanshin Expressway appeared on front pages of newspapers worldwide. Most people in Japan believed those structures to be relatively safe from earthquake damage because of the steel-reinforced concrete design. Although the initial belief was that construction had been negligent, it was later shown that most of the collapsed structures were constructed properly according to the building codes in force in the 1960s. The steel-reinforcement specifications in the 1960s regulations had already been discovered to be inadequate and revised several times, the latest revision being in 1981, which proved effective but only applied to new structures.

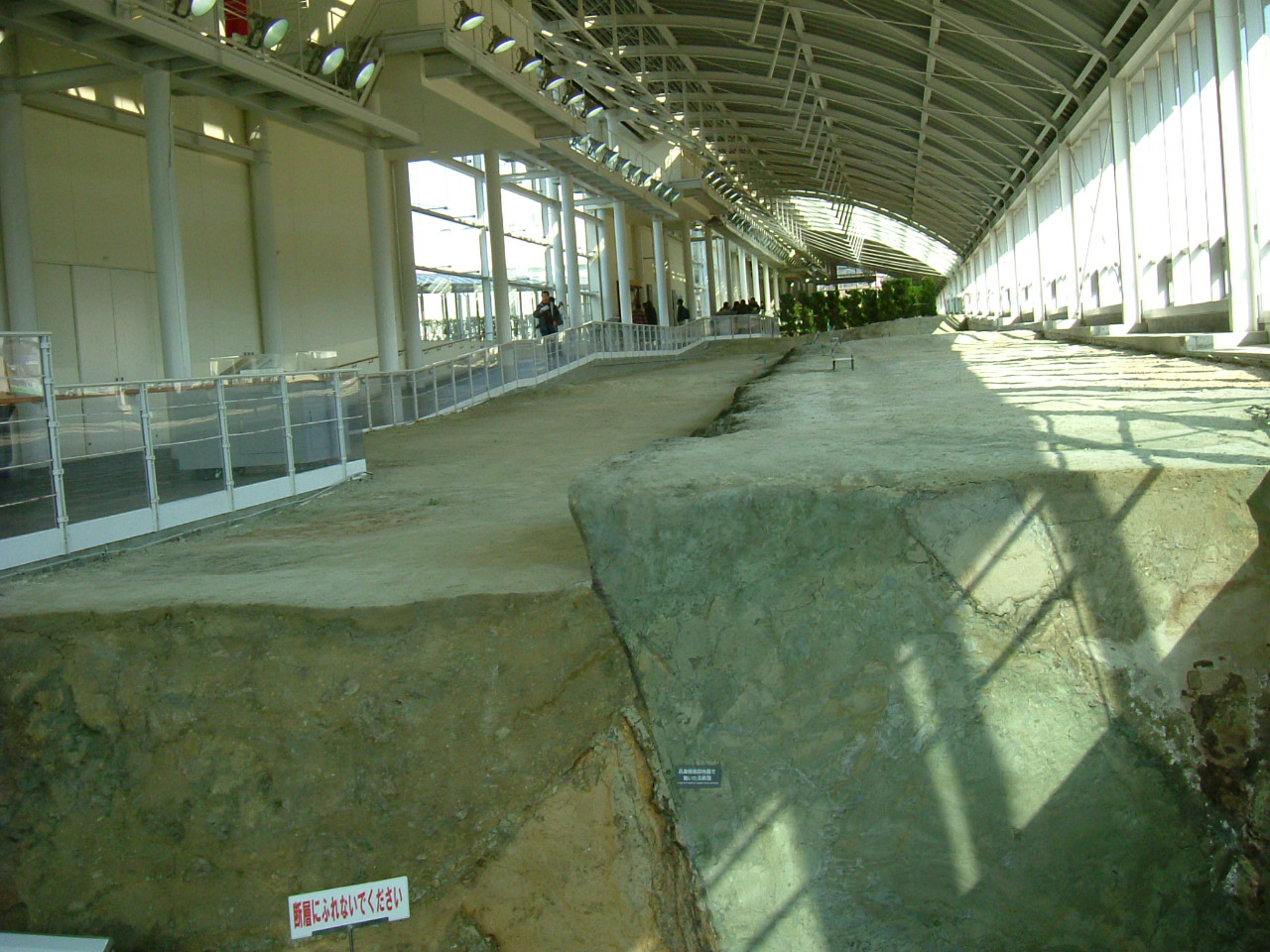
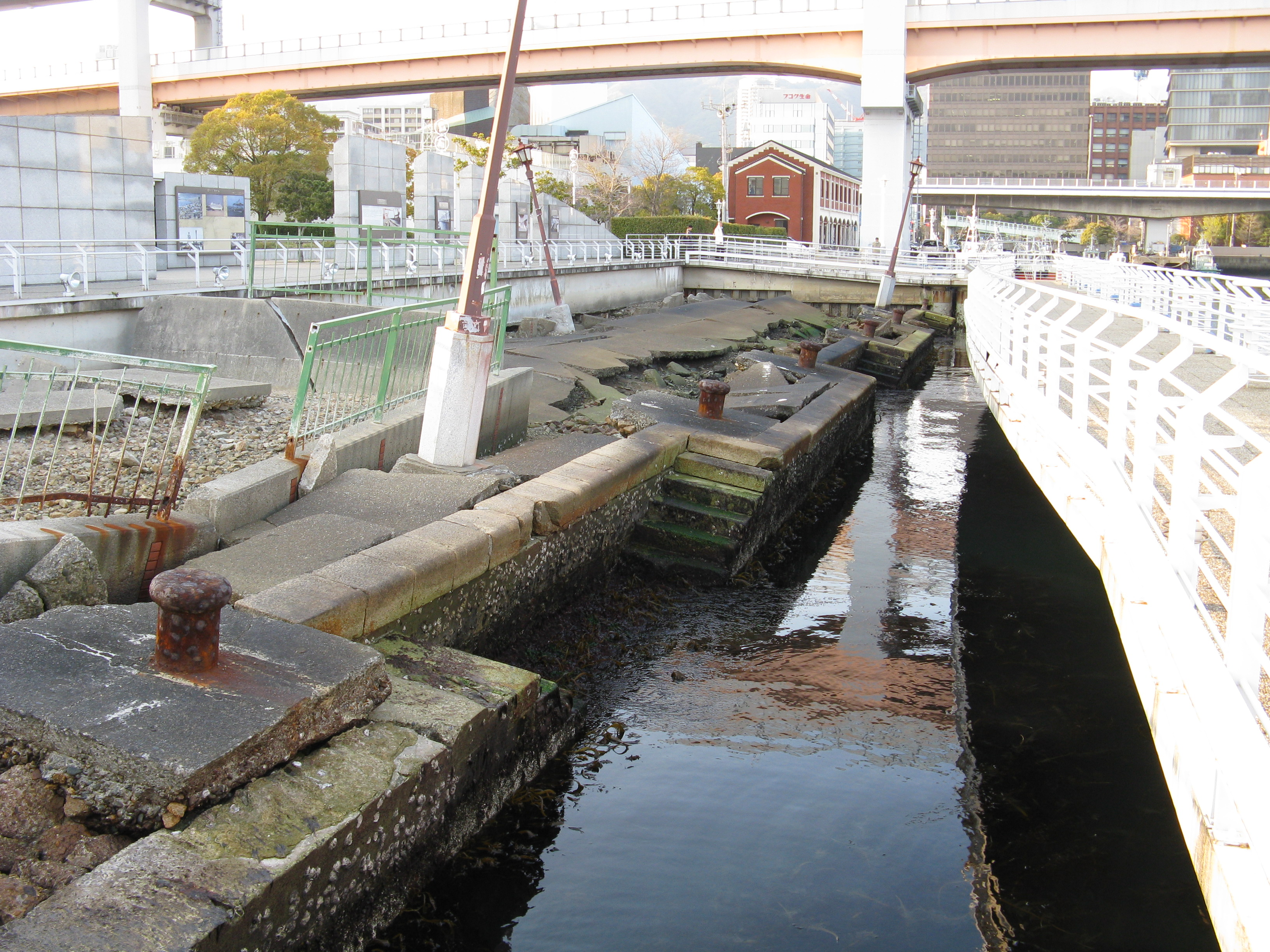
A section of the Nojima Fault (left) and preserved damage at the Earthquake Memorial Park near the port of Kobe (right)

Ten spans of the Kobe Route elevated expressway were knocked over in three locations across Kobe and Nishinomiya, blocking a link that carried 40% of Osaka-Kobe road traffic. Half of the elevated expressway's piers sustained some damage. The entire route was not reopened until September 30, 1996. Three bridges on the less heavily used Route 2 were damaged, but the highway was reopened well ahead of Route 3 and served as one of the main intercity road links for a time. The Meishin Expressway was only lightly damaged, but was closed during the day until February 17, 1995, so that emergency vehicles could easily access the hardest-hit areas to the west. It was not until July 29 that all four lanes were opened to traffic along one section. Many surface highways were clogged for some time due to the collapse of higher-capacity elevated highways.

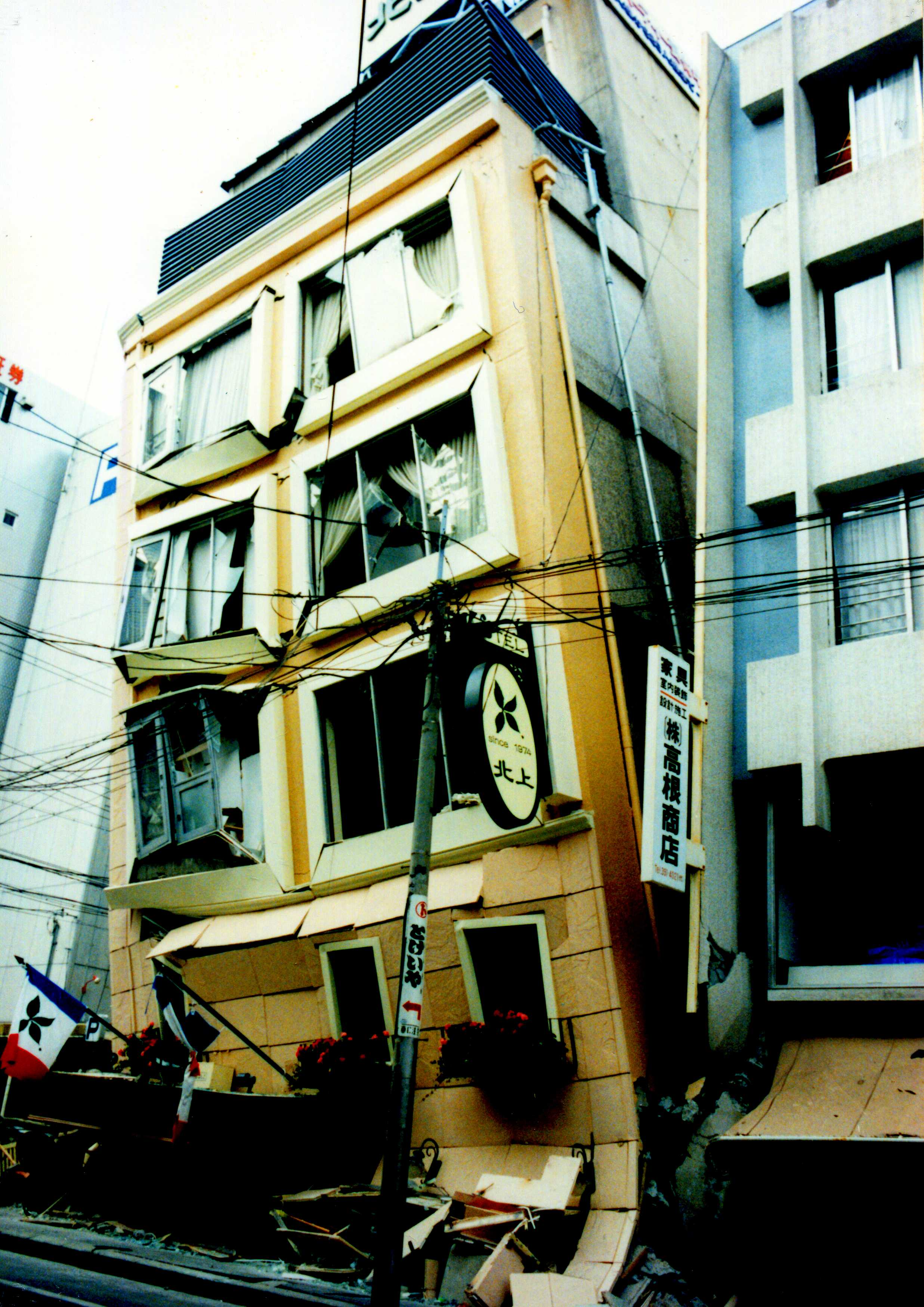
A building with its first floor completely crushed.

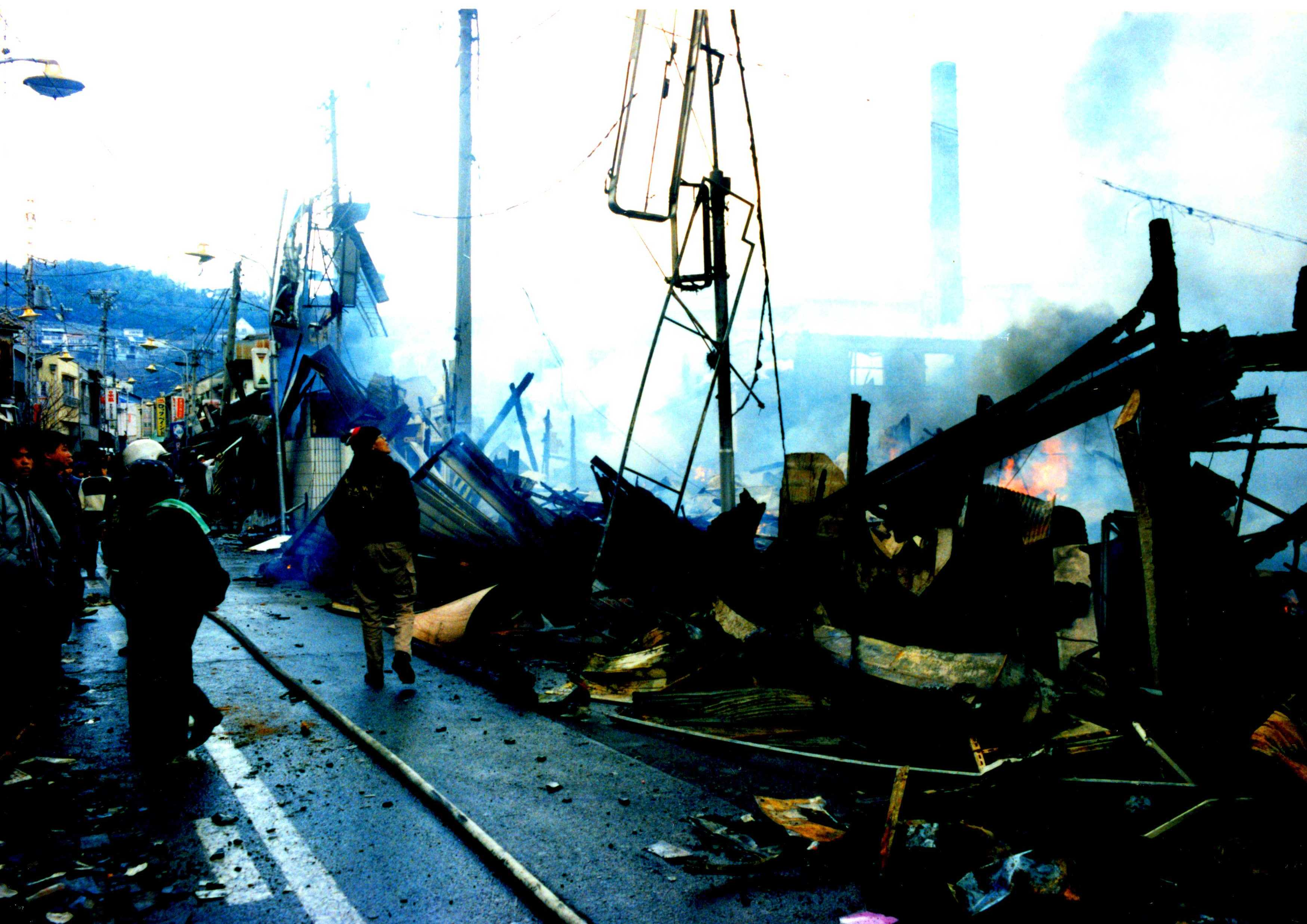
Many towns burned to the ground.

The Kashiwagi Building toppled onto its side, making Flower Road impassable for two weeks.

Most railways in the region were damaged. In the aftermath of the earthquake, only 30% of the Osaka-Kobe railway tracks were operational. Daikai Station on the Kobe Rapid Railway line collapsed, bringing down part of National Route 28 above it. Wooden supports collapsed inside supposedly solid concrete pilings under the tracks of the Sanyo Shinkansen high-speed rail line, causing the entire line to shut down. 58 train cars were at Ishiyagawa Depot of the Hanshin Electric Railway when it collapsed, which rendered 24 of them damaged beyond repair. The railways rebounded quickly after the quake, reaching 80% operability in one month. The Kobe Municipal Subway resumed operation the day after the earthquake with limited service between Seishin-Chuo and Itayado stations (along with the Hokushin Kyuko Electric Railway between Tanigami and Shin-Kobe). Service resumed across the entire line on February 16, 1995, with full service resuming a month later after repairs were completed. Trains continued to operate with speed restrictions until July 21, 1995.

Artificial islands, such as the modern Rokkō Island and especially Port Island in Kobe, suffered severe subsidence due to liquefaction. Water breaking through the surface and flooding those islands was initially believed to have seeped in from the sea, but in fact had been forced out of the soil used to build the islands. The newly completed artificial island supporting Kansai International Airport was not significantly affected, due it being further from the epicenter, and because it was built to the latest standards. The Akashi Kaikyō Bridge, under construction near the earthquake's epicenter, was undamaged but was reportedly lengthened by a full meter due to horizontal displacement along the activated tectonic fault.

=== Nomenclature ===
Outside Japan the earthquake and disaster are commonly referred to as the Kobe earthquake; in Japan, the earthquake and the disaster caused by it is called The Great Hanshin-Awaji Earthquake Disaster (阪神・淡路大震災, Hanshin-Awaji Daishinsai), often shortened to The Great Hanshin Earthquake Disaster (阪神大震災, Hanshin Daishinsai) (Hanshin (阪神) refers to the area encompassing Osaka and Kobe). In the scientific literature the earthquake itself is called the 1995 Southern Hyōgo Prefecture Earthquake (平成7年(1995年)兵庫県南部地震, Heisei 7 nen (1995 nen) Hyōgo-ken Nanbu Jishin), the name given to it by the Japan Meteorological Agency the week after the main shock.

== Other aspects ==
The quake ravaged many of the facilities of what was then the world's sixth-largest container port and the source of nearly 40% of Kobe's industrial output.

The sheer size of the earthquake caused a major decline in Japanese stock markets, with the Nikkei 225 index plunging by 1,025 points on the day following the quake. This financial damage was the immediate cause for the collapse of Barings Bank due to the actions of Nick Leeson, who had speculated vast amounts of money on Japanese and Singaporean derivatives. Discussions of Japan's "Lost Decade" tend towards purely economic analysis, and neglect the impact of the earthquake on the Japanese economy which at the time was already suffering from recession.

Despite this devastation in a big production center, the local economy recovered very quickly. Even though less than half the port facilities had been rebuilt by that stage, within a year import volumes through the port had recovered fully and export volumes were nearly back to where they would have been without the disaster. Less than 15 months after the earthquake, in March 1996, manufacturing activity in greater Kobe was at 98% of its projected pre-quake level.

=== Volunteerism ===
The fact that volunteers from all over Japan converged on Kobe to help victims of the quake was an important event in the history of volunteerism in Japan. The year 1995 is often regarded as a turning point in the emergence of volunteerism as a major form of civic engagement.

In December 1995, the government declared January 17 a national "Disaster Prevention and Volunteerism Day", and the week from January 15 to 21 a national "Disaster Prevention and Volunteerism Week", to be commemorated with lectures, seminars, and other events designed to encourage voluntary disaster preparedness and relief efforts.

=== Disaster planning ===
The earthquake proved to be a major wake-up call for Japanese disaster prevention authorities. Japan installed rubber blocks under bridges to absorb the shock and rebuilt buildings further apart to prevent collateral damage. The national government changed its disaster response policies in the wake of the earthquake, and its response to the 2004 Chūetsu earthquake was significantly faster and more effective. The Ground Self-Defense Forces were given automatic authority to respond to earthquakes over a certain magnitude, which allowed them to deploy to the Niigata region within minutes. Control over fire response was likewise handed over from local fire departments to a central command base in Tokyo and Kyoto.

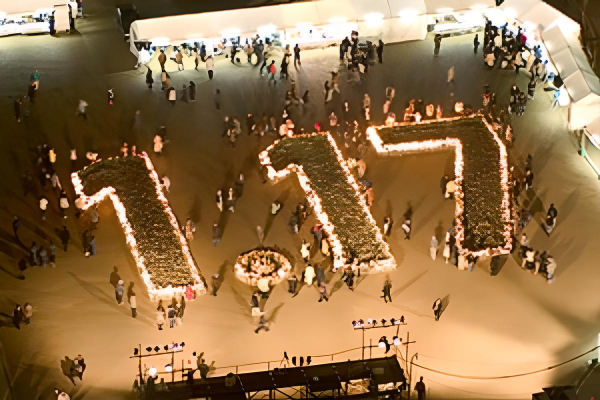
1.17 memorial in Kobe in January 2005, ten years later

In response to the widespread damage to transportation infrastructure, and the resulting effect on emergency response times in the disaster area, the Ministry of Land, Infrastructure and Transport began designating special disaster prevention routes and reinforcing the roads and surrounding buildings so as to keep them as intact as possible in the event of another earthquake. Hyōgo's prefectural government invested millions of yen in the following years to build earthquake-proof shelters and supplies in public parks.

=== Memorials ===
The Kobe Luminarie is an event held for approximately two weeks every December. A street leading from the Daimaru store in Motomachi to Higashi Yuenchi Park (next to Kobe city hall) is decorated with arches of multicoloured lights that were donated by the Italian government. Amongst the commemorative events held on the anniversary of the earthquake, large "1.17" digits are illuminated in Higashi Yuenchi Park in the early hours of January 17 each year.

== Response ==
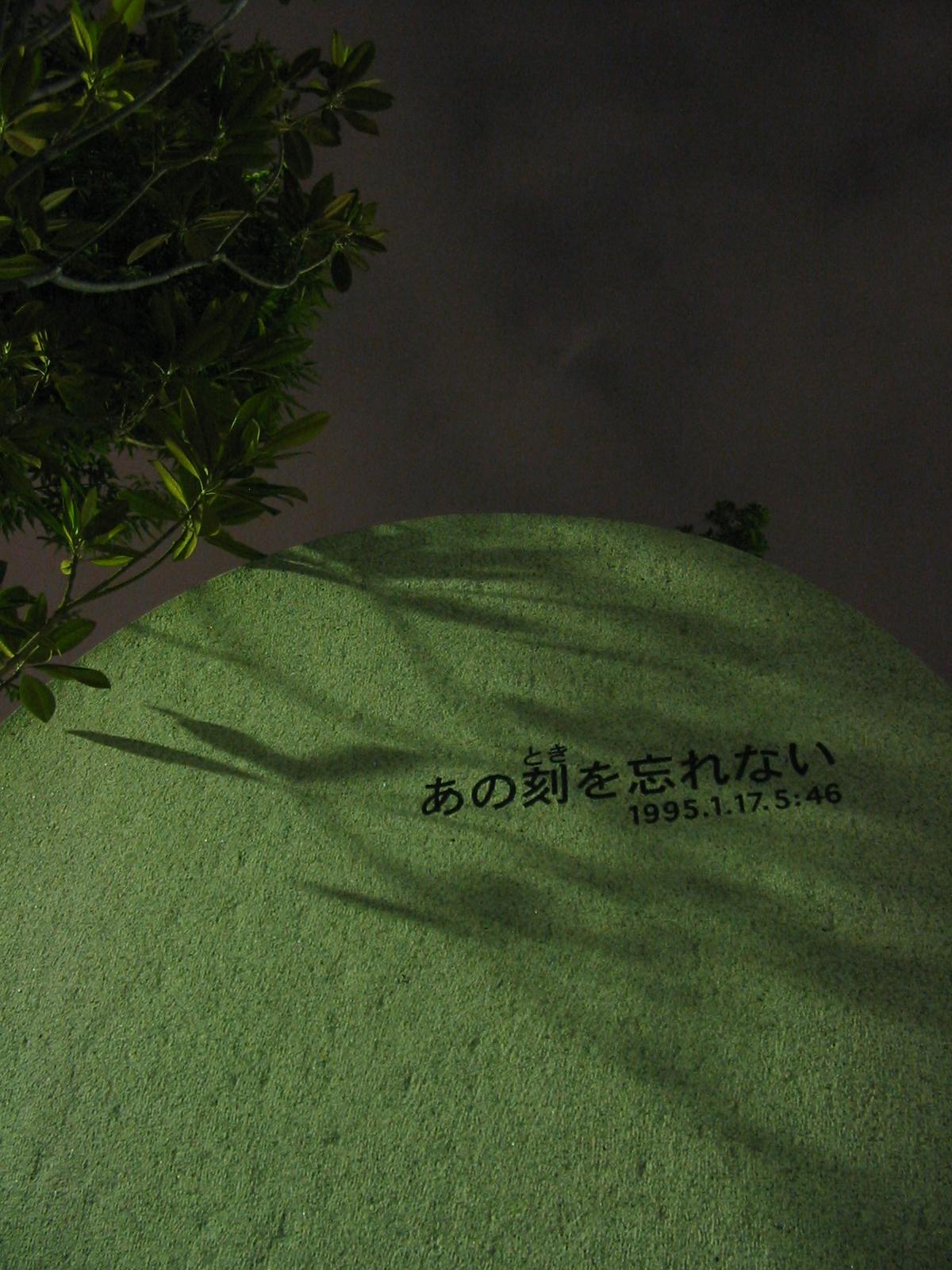
Local memorial in Kobe. "We won't forget that time"

Approximately 1.2 million volunteers, including foreigners, were involved in relief efforts during the first three months following the earthquake. Retailers such as Daiei and 7-Eleven used their existing supply networks to provide necessities in affected areas, while NTT and Motorola provided free telephone service for victims. The organized crime Yamaguchi-gumi yakuza syndicate was actively involved in the relief effort from the beginning, distributing substantial amounts of food and supplies to needy victims. Aid provided by the Yamaguchi-gumi was particularly crucial in the immediate aftermath of the earthquake, due to the failure of the Japanese government to organize effective relief to the area initially.

Local hospitals struggled to keep up with demand for medical treatment, largely due to collapsed or obstructed "lifelines" (roads) that kept supplies and personnel from reaching the affected areas. People were forced to wait in corridors due to the overcrowding and lack of space. Some people had to be operated on in waiting rooms and corridors.

To help speed the recovery effort, the government closed most of the Hanshin Expressway network to private vehicles from 6:00 am to 8:00 pm daily and limited traffic to buses, taxis and other designated vehicles. To keep the light rail system running even though it had quite severely damaged sections, shuttle buses were commissioned to transfer patrons to stations around damaged sections.

== See also ==
- List of disasters in Japan by death toll
- List of earthquakes in 1995
- List of earthquakes in Japan
- Natural disasters in Japan
