= Awaji Yumebutai =

Complex in Awaji, Japan

Coordinates: 34.562628°N 135.010185°E

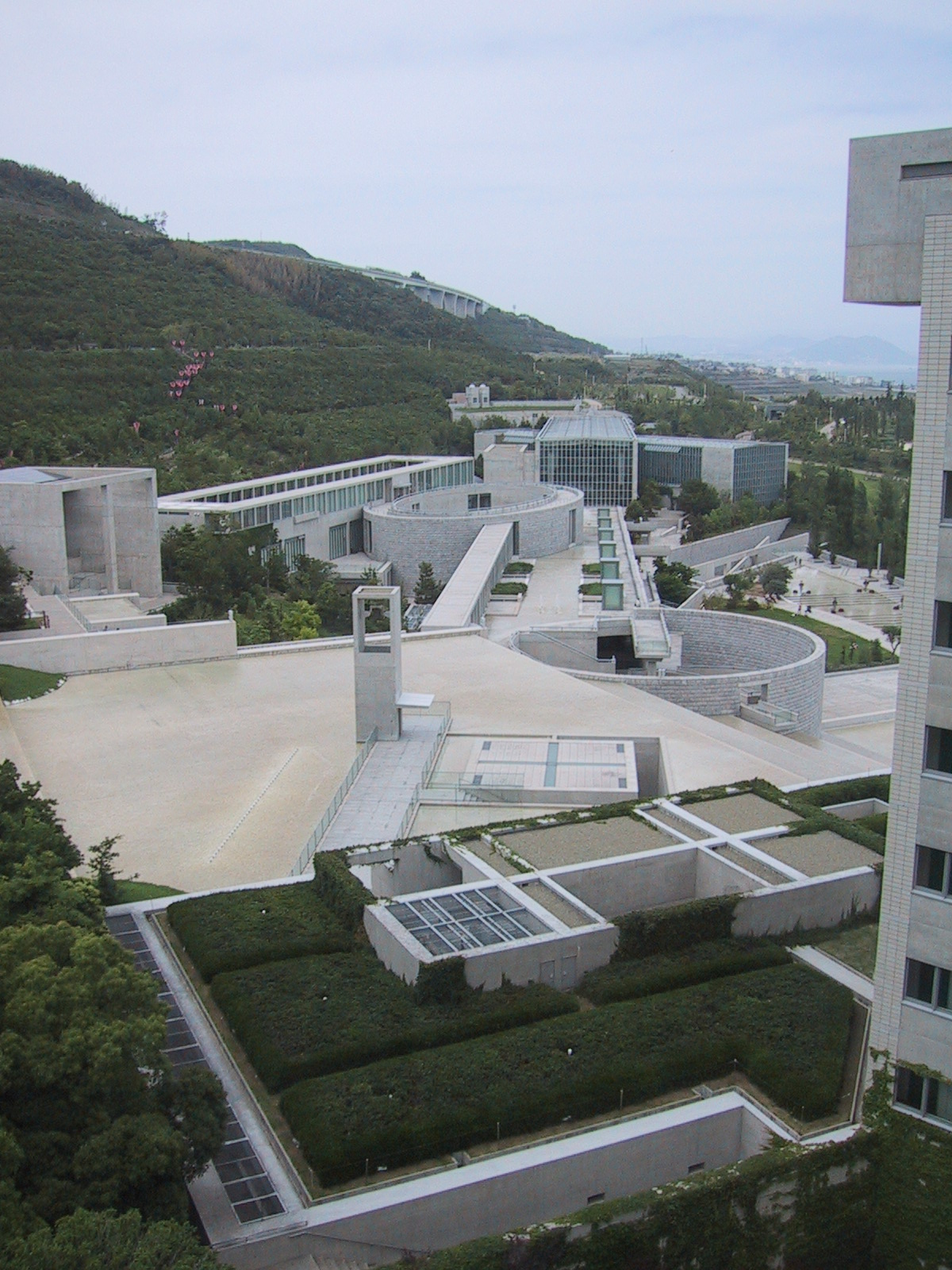

The Awaji Yumebutai (淡路夢舞台) is a complex comprising a conference center, hotel and memorial in Awaji, Hyōgo, Japan, built near the epicenter of the 1995 Great Hanshin Awaji earthquake. It was designed by Tadao Ando, who had begun planning for the project (as a park) prior to the earthquake. The hotel is operated as the Westin Awaji Island Resort.

== Etymology ==
Yumebutai (夢舞台) literally means "Dream Stage", from yume (夢; "dream") and butai (舞台; "performance stage, setting"). Metaphorically "a place in which to dream", the name refers to the aim of restoring the ecology of the island, whose soil had been partly removed for land reclamation in Osaka.

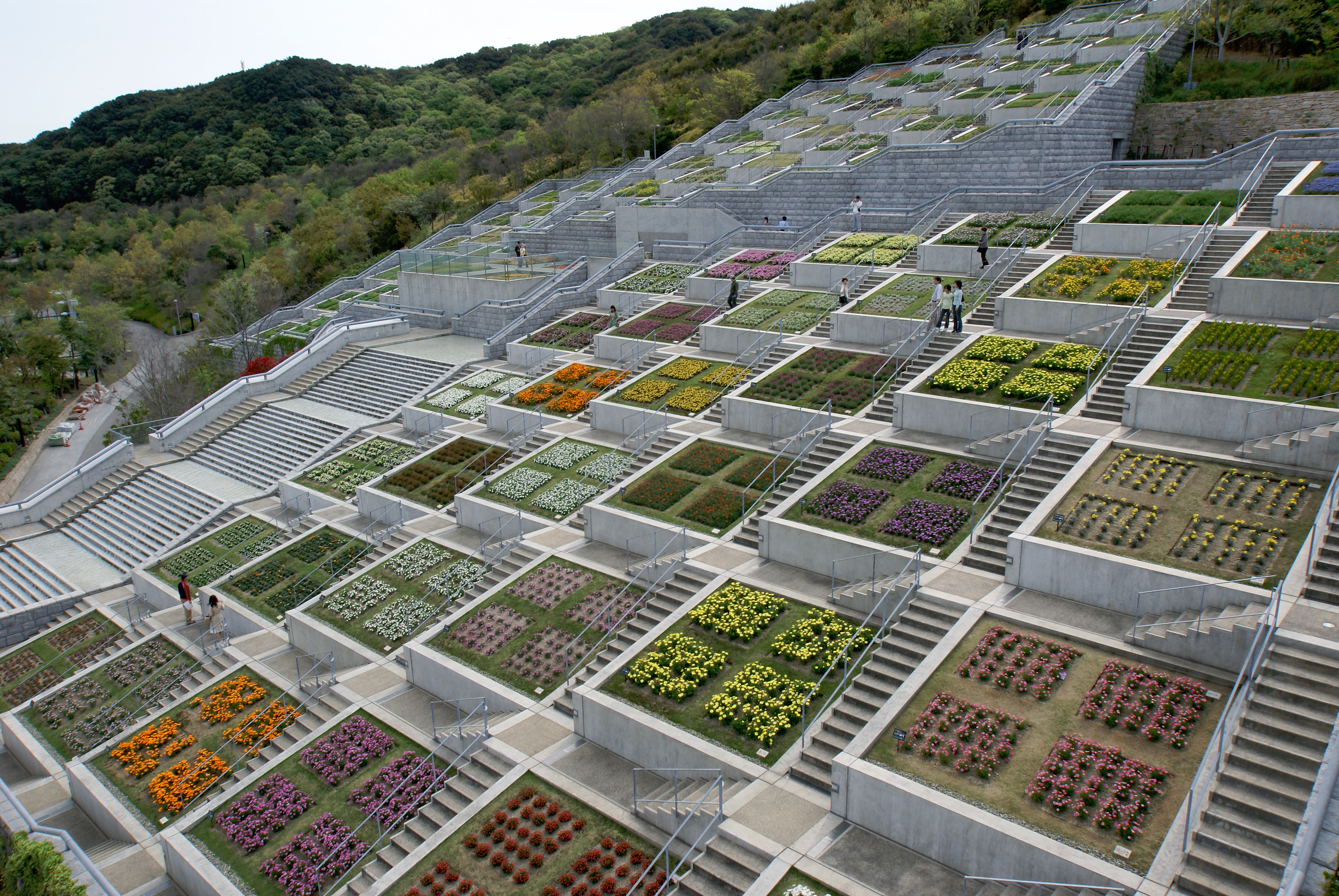
Hyakudanen

== Hyakudanen ==
One of the most distinctive features in the complex is the Hyakudan'en (百段苑; "hundred stepped gardens"), a group of 100 flower beds (small square gardens) on an incline, arranged in grids spread over several levels. The "hundred" refers to the number of mini-gardens and not the steps, as there are 1,575 steps and 235 flights.

== See also ==
- Miracle Planet Museum of Plants, a nearby greenhouse
- The 100 Views of Nature in Kansai
