= Esaki Lighthouse =

Esaki Lighthouse 江埼灯台
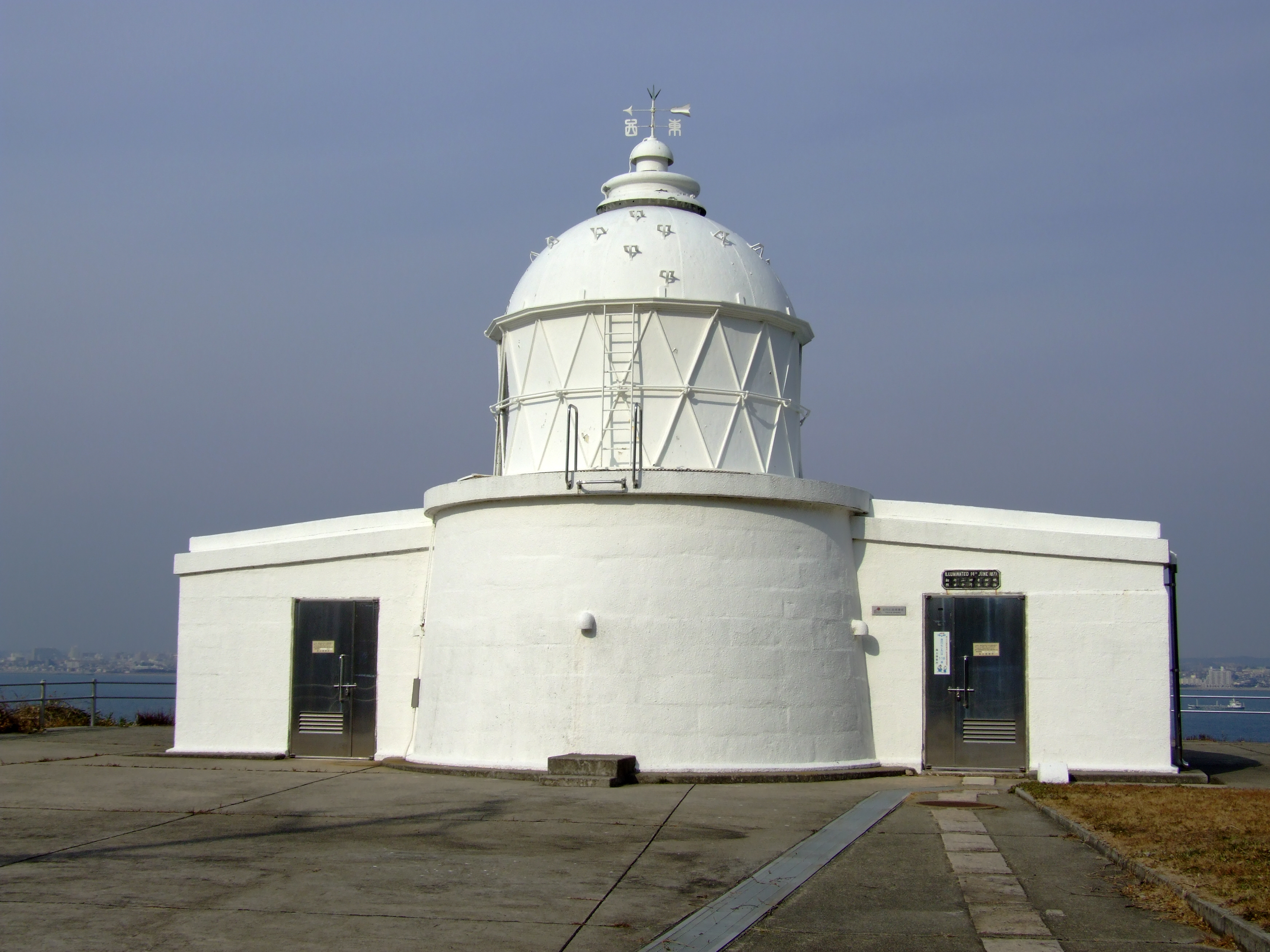
- Esaki Lighthouse
- Location: Awaji Island, Awaji, Japan
- Coordinates: 34°36′23″N 134°59′36″E

Tower
- Constructed: 14 June 1871
- Construction: stone
- Automated: 1981
- Height: 8.27 m (27.1 ft)
- Shape: cylinder
- Markings: White
- Heritage: Important Cultural Property

Light
- First lit: 1871
- Focal height: 48.5 m (159 ft)
- Lens: second order Fresnel lens, third order Fresnel lens
- Intensity: 62,000 candela (white), 24,000 candela (red)
- Range: 18.5 nmi (34.3 km; 21.3 mi) (white), 16 nmi (30 km; 18 mi) (red)
- Characteristic: Al W R 10s
- Japan no.: JCG-3801 [F5796]

Esaki Lighthouse (江埼灯台, esaki tōdai) is a lighthouse located in the city of Awaji, Hyōgo Japan. It is located at the northernmost cape of Awaji Island facing the Akashi Strait opposite the city of Kobe. The lighthouse is located within the borders of the Setonaikai National Park. It is registered with the Japanese government as an “A-grade Lighthouse” for historic preservation and is listed as one of the “50 Lighthouses of Japan” by the Japan Lighthouse Association. It is operated by the Japan Coast Guard.

== History ==
Esaki Lighthouse was one of the 26 lighthouses to be built in Meiji period Japan by British engineer Richard Henry Brunton. It was one of the five lighthouses stipulated specifically by the provisions of the Anglo-Japanese Treaty of Amity and Commerce of 1858, in which the Tokugawa shogunate agreed to open the port of Hyōgo to western commerce and to allow British subjects to reside in Osaka. The treaty continued to be honored by the Meiji government. Work began in May 1870. The lighthouse was completed and lit for the first time on June 14,1871. The tower was built from granite quarried on the island of Ieshima in the Seto Inland Sea, and the original light source was an oil lamp. It was electrified in 1933 and became unattended from 1981. The structure was severely damaged by the January 1995 Great Hanshin earthquake. In 1996, the former staff quarters of the lighthouse was restored and relocated to the Shikoku Mura open-air architectural park in Takamatsu, Kagawa. It was designated a National Registered Tangible Cultural Property in 2000. The Esaki Lighthouse was designated as a National Important Cultural Property in 2022.

== Gallery ==
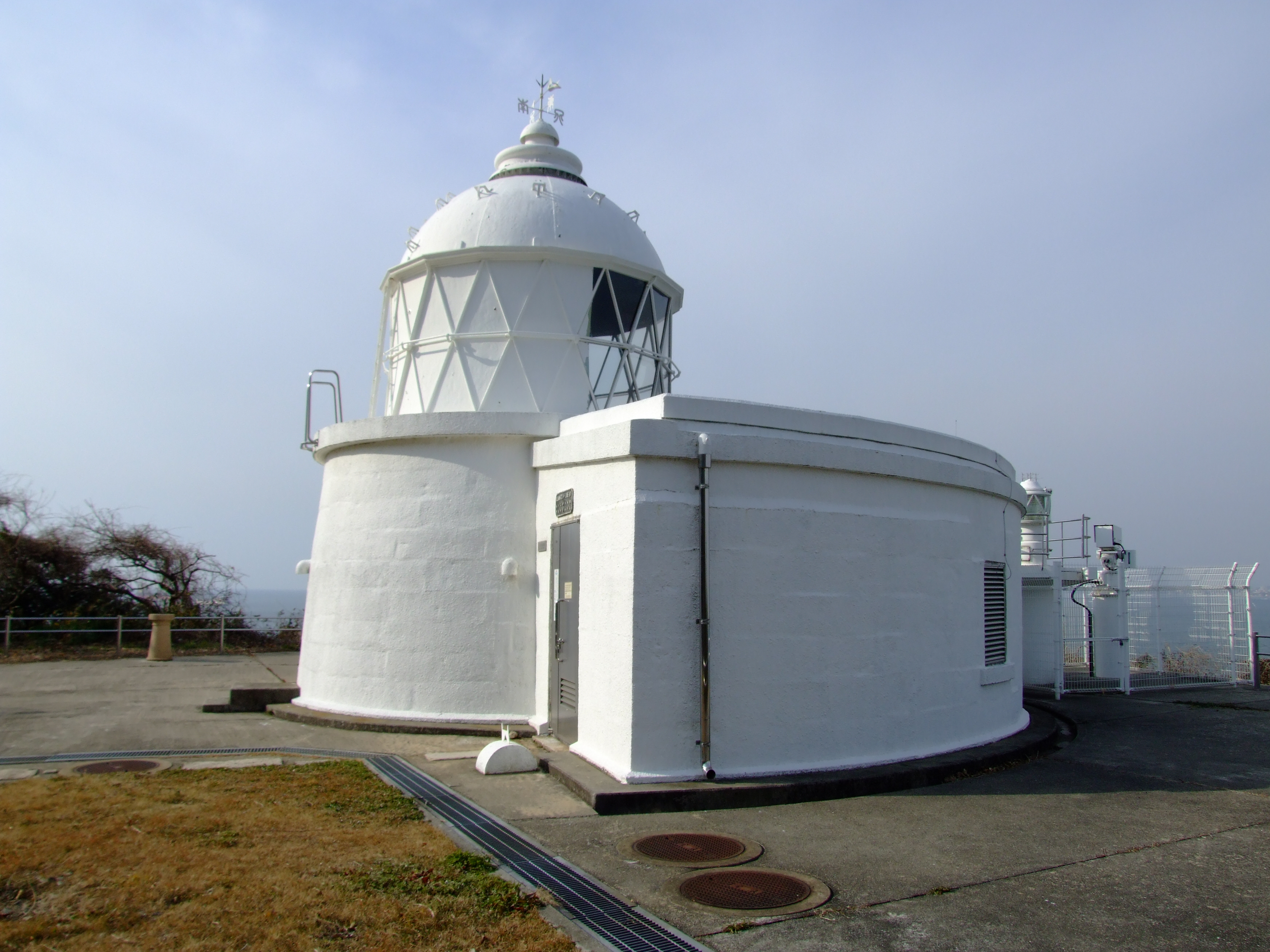
Esaki Lighthouse

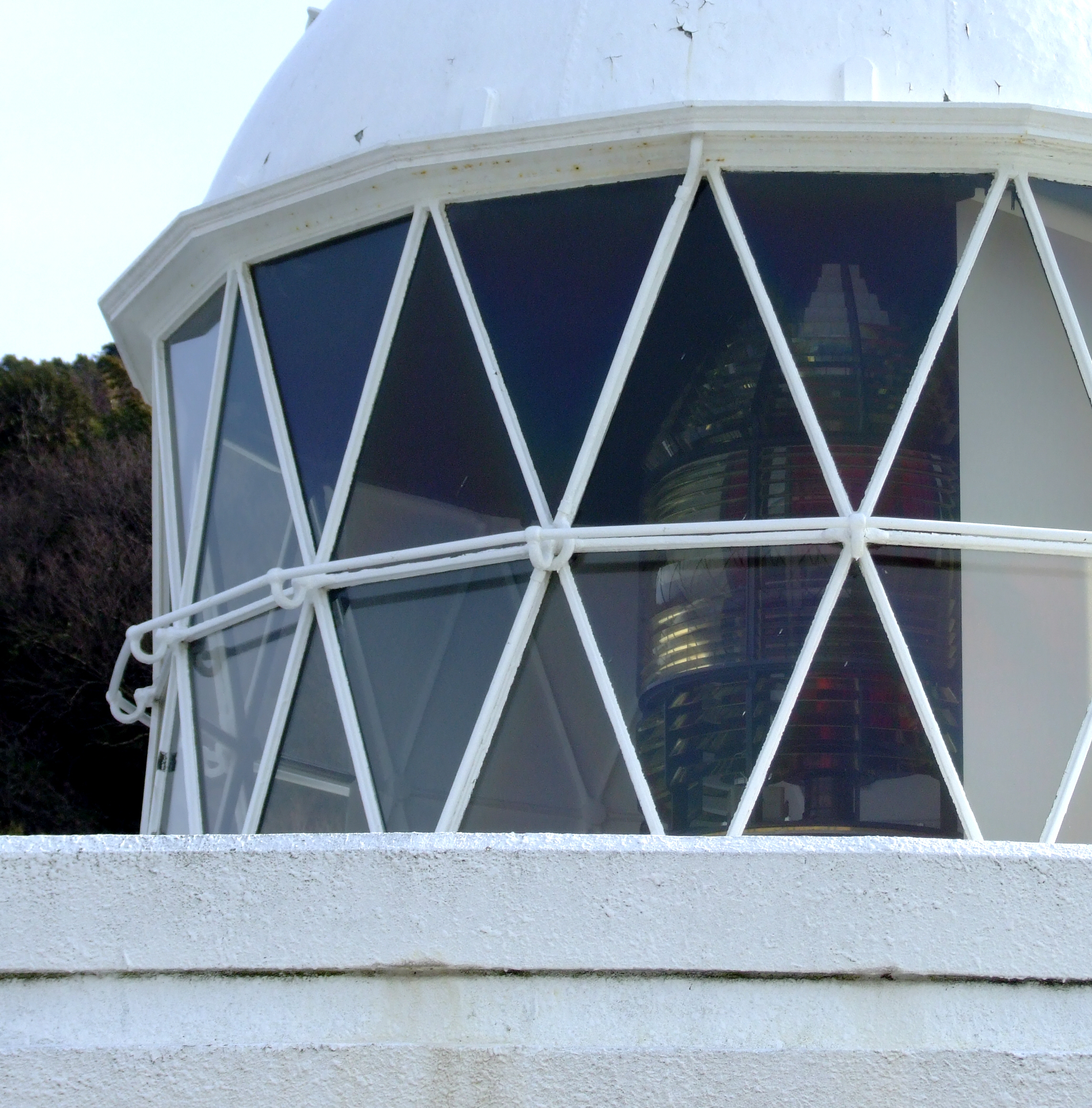
Lens

== See also ==
- List of lighthouses in Japan
- Akashi Kaikyō Bridge
- Awaji Island
