= Goshiki, Hyōgo =

Dissolved municipality in Hyōgo prefecture, Japan

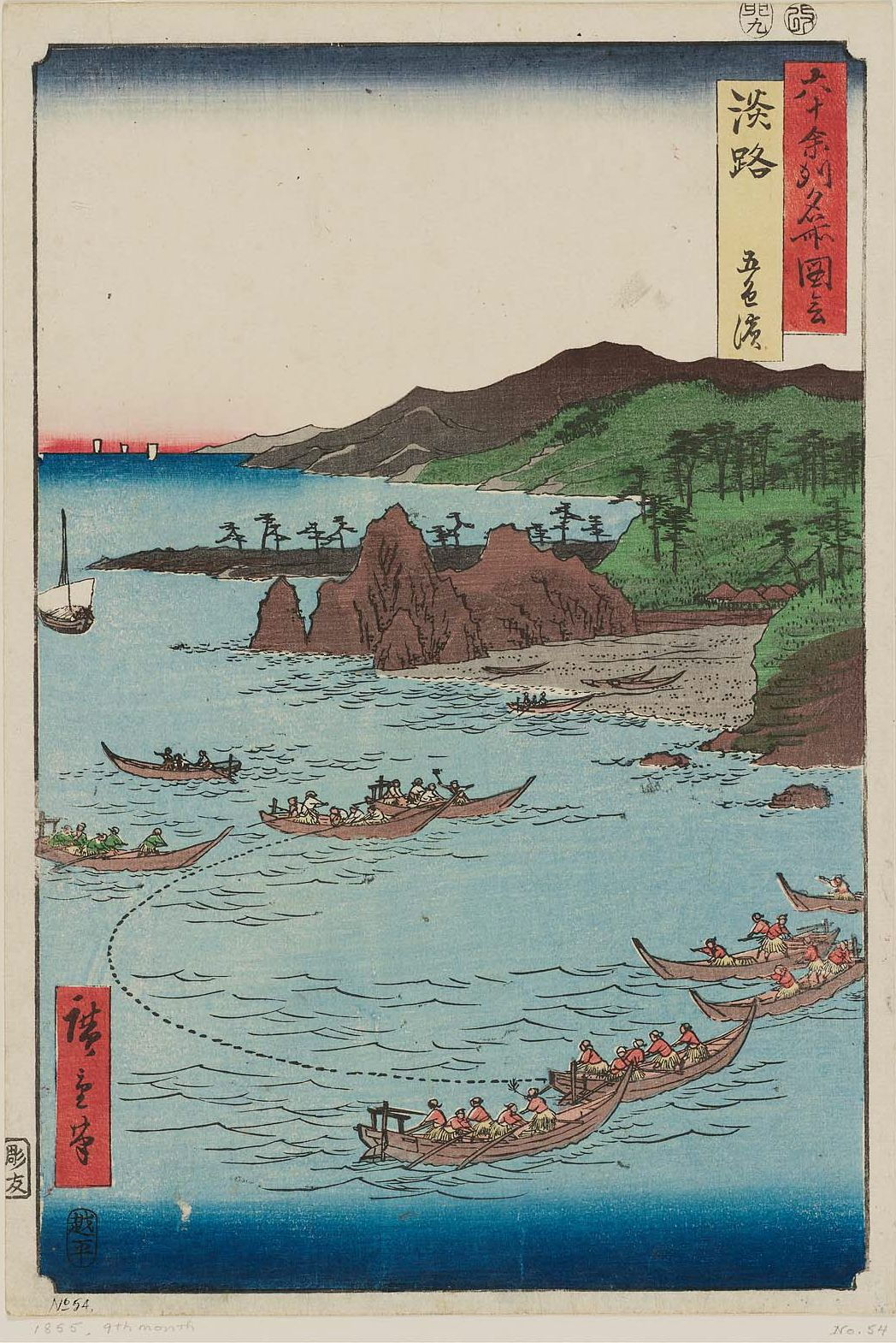
Goshiki Beach by Hiroshige

Goshiki (五色町, Goshiki-chō) was a town in the Tsuna District, Hyōgo Prefecture, Japan, located on the central-western coast of Awaji Island, facing the Seto Inland Sea, in the Kansai region of southern Honshu. In February 2006, it was merged into the city of Sumoto.

== Geography and location ==
Goshiki was a town in the Tsuna District, Hyōgo Prefecture, Japan. Located on the central-western coast of Awaji Island, facing the Seto Inland Sea, in the Kansai region of southern Honshu. On 11 February 2006, Goshiki was merged into the expanded city of Sumoto. Goshiki covered the western third of Sumoto and consists of five village: Tsushi and Torikai on the coast and Aihara, Hiroishi, and Sakai inland. For tourists, Goshiki is notable for its beaches and coastal campgrounds.

== Transport ==
Goshiki's public transportation was relatively limited, particularly outside the coastal village of Tsushi. Tsushi enjoyed direct highway bus connections to and from Kobe, providing a convenient link to the mainland. However, these buses bypassed Goshiki's inland villages, which were instead connected by three infrequent local bus routes. The Tsushi Route linked Sumoto with Aihara and Tsushi, occasionally continuing to Torikai and Minato in neighboring Minamiawaji. The Torikai Route connected Sakai and Torikai with Sumoto and Minato, while the Hiroishi Route served Hiroishi and Aihara with a connection to Tsuna further north. Reaching more remote sites such as the Shirasu Castle Ruins often required a combination of bus travel and hiking.

The town's road network played a more significant role in local transport. Two main north–south routes passed through Goshiki: Route 31, which ran along the coast and was relatively flat, and Route 66, which traversed the hillier inland areas between Tsuna and Minamiawaji. East-west travel was supported by Routes 46 and 472, which linked Tsushi and Torikai with Sumoto, although these roads could be narrow and winding. Despite its rural setting, Goshiki was considered a favorable location for budget-conscious travelers and cyclists exploring Awaji Island.

== Demographics ==
As of the 2020 Japanese census conducted by the Statistics Bureau of Japan, Goshiki had a population of 8,602 people, divided into 4,115 males and 4,487 females.

== International relations ==
Goshiki became a sister city with Van Wert, United States in February 1996. The two cities remained sister cities also after Goshiki merger into Sumoto in 2006. Five years later, Goshiki became a sister city with Kronstadt, Russia in July 2001.
