= Kansai University of Nursing and Health Sciences =

Coordinates: 34°26′09″N 134°54′01″E

- 関西看護医療大学
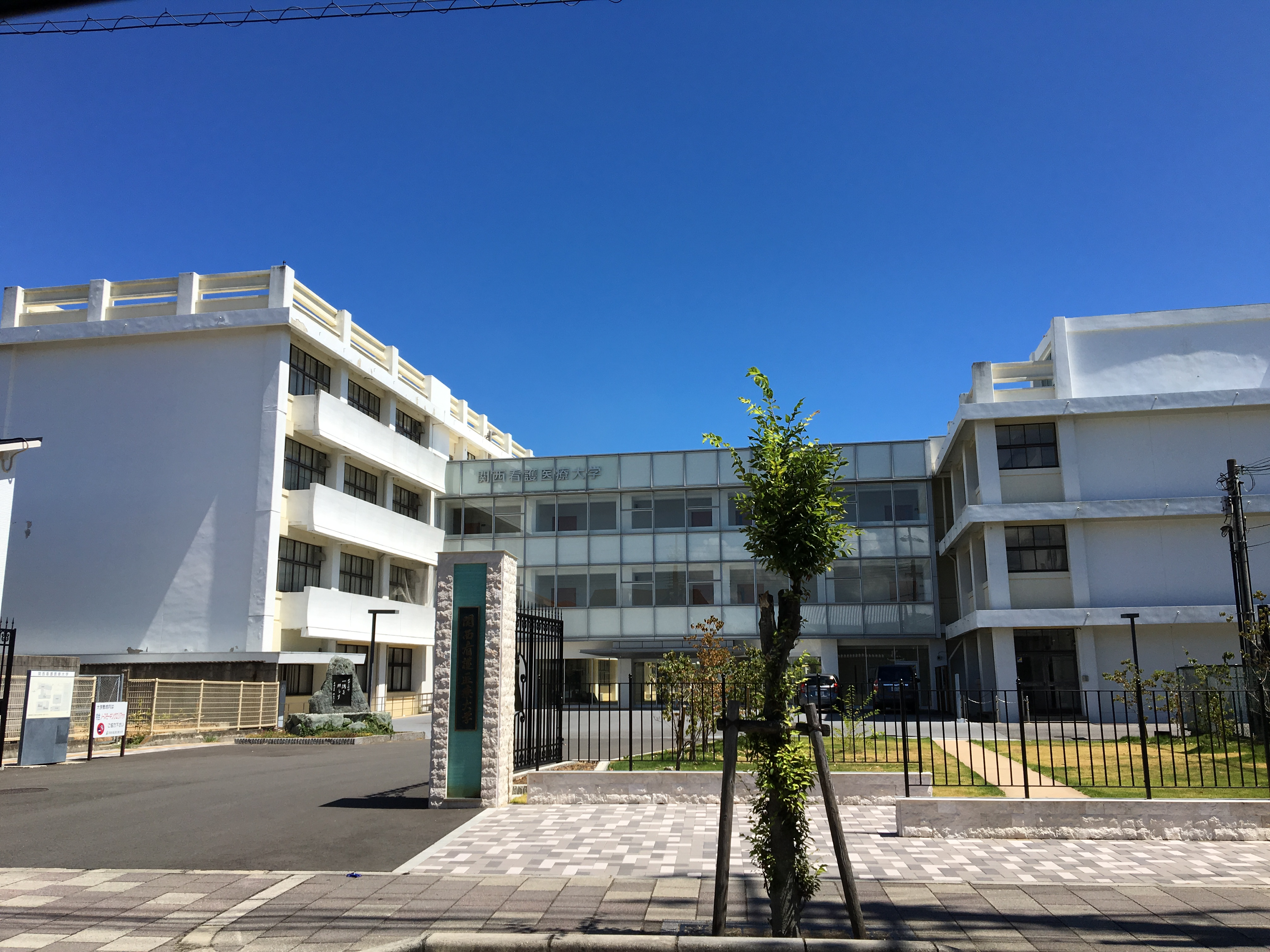
- Type: Private
- Established: 2006
- Location: Awaji, Hyōgo, Japan
- Website: www.kki.ac.jp

Kansai University of Nursing and Health Sciences (関西看護医療大学, Kansai kango iryō daigaku) is a private university in Awaji, Hyōgo, Japan. The school was established in 2006 as Junshin-kai University of Nursing and Health. The school adopted its present name in 2008.
