= Kiseki No Hoshi Greenhouse =

Botanical garden in Tsuna, Awaji, Hyōgo, Japan

Coordinates: 34°33′42.4″N 135°0′30.3″E

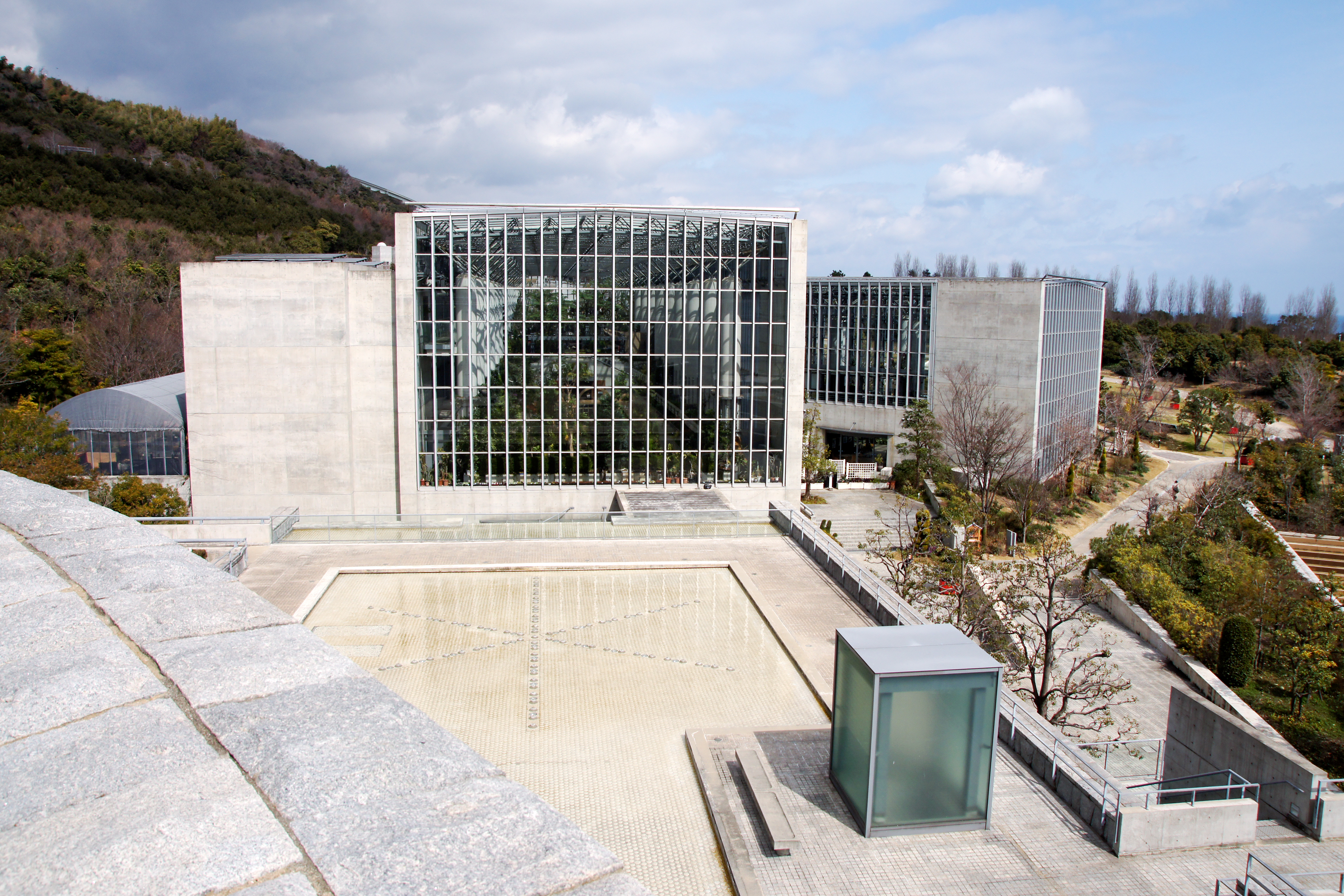
Kiseki No Hoshi Greenhouse

The Kiseki No Hoshi Greenhouse (奇跡の星の植物館, Kiseki no Hoshi no Shokubutsukan, 6,700 m^{2}), also known as the Miracle Planet Museum of Plants, is a botanical garden within a greenhouse located at Yumebutai 4 Banchi, Higashiura-cho, Tsuna, Awaji, Hyōgo, Japan. It is open most days; an admission fee is charged.

The greenhouse opened in 2000, and contains a fern room, an atrium with small gardens, and five additional rooms as follows:

- Plants Gallery - succulent plants with art objects
- Tropical Garden
- New Lifestyle with Plants - various styles of Japanese gardens
- Healing Garden - nature and art
- Flower Show Space - space for floral exhibits (1,000 m^{2})

== See also ==
- Awaji Yumebutai
- List of botanical gardens in Japan
