= Gossa Kaito Site =

- 五斗長垣内遺跡 (Japanese)
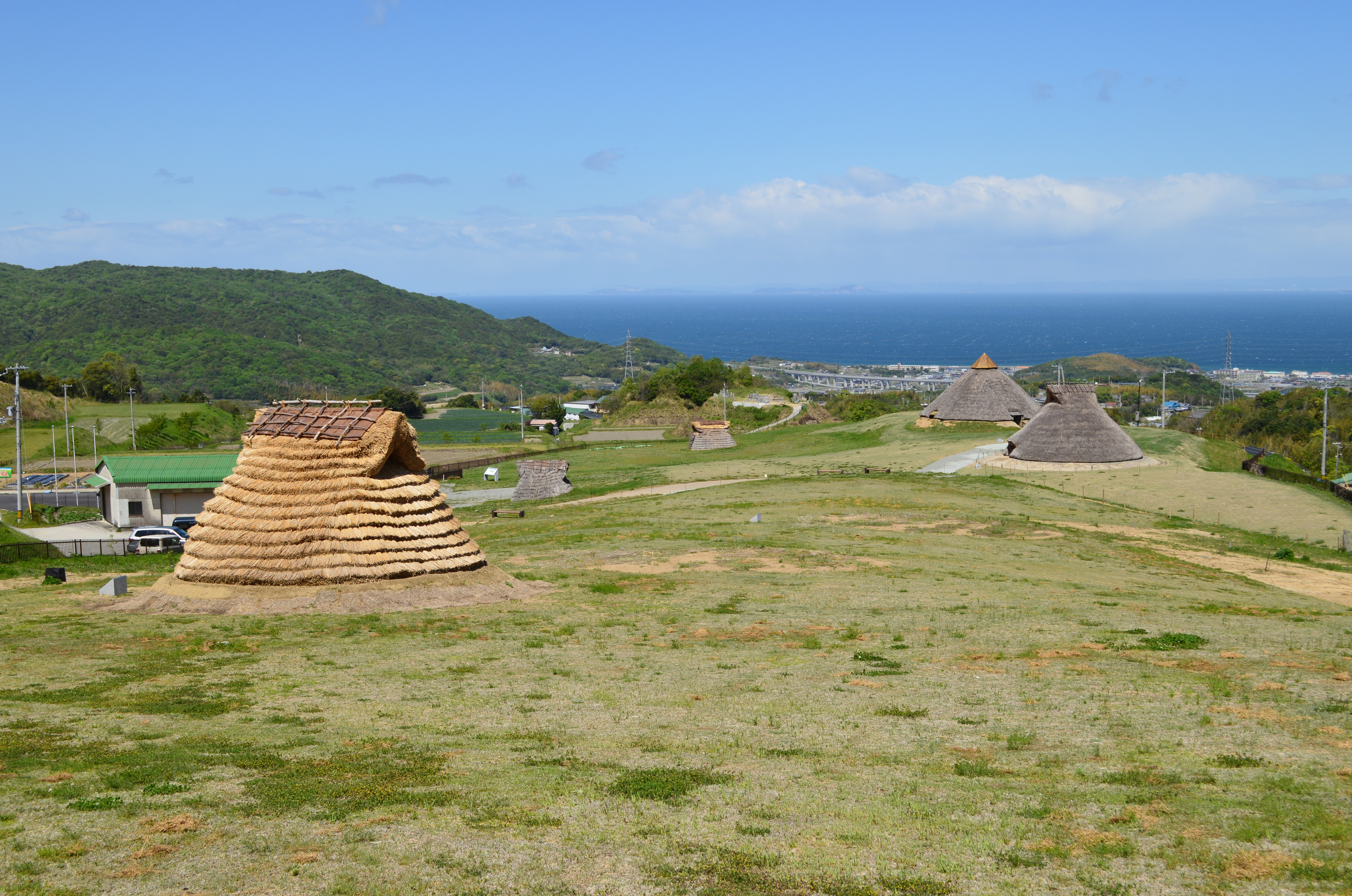
- Gossa Kaito Site

- Gossa Kaito Site Gossa Kaito Site (Japan)
- 34°30′18.4″N 134°54′30.3″E
- Type: settlement
- Periods: Yayoi period
- Location: Awaji, Hyōgo, Japan
- Region: Kansai region

History
- Built: 1st century AD

Site notes
- Public access: Yes (park, museum)

The Gossa Kaito Site (五斗長垣内遺跡) is an archaeological site located in the Kurodani neighborhood of the city of Awaji, Hyōgo in the Kansai region of Japan, with the traces of a late Yayoi period settlement. The site was designated a National Historic Site of Japan in 2012.

== Overview ==
The site is located in a hilly area three kilometers from the western coastline of Awaji Island and occupies an area of approximately 500 meters east-to-west by 100 meters north-to-south. It was discovered in 2001 and archaeological excavations have been conducted since 2007. It was found to contain the traces of pit-house dwellings and blacksmith workshops which existed over a one hundred year period around the 1st century AD. Although Yayoi Japan is thought of as a Bronze Age culture, towards the end of the period iron working became common, and this is the largest ironware manufacturing community site to have yet been discovered in Japan. It consisted of 23 buildings, of which 12 were confirmed to have the remains of a furnace processing iron. Seventy-five pieces of ironware, including arrowheads, iron pieces, and cut slabs, were excavated. Many stone tools for processing iron, such as mallets, anvil stones, and whetstones, were also found. One of the structures was a factory with ten blacksmith furnaces a single building.

The site is preserved as an archaeological park with a museum and some reconstructed pit dwellings.

== See also ==
- List of Historic Sites of Japan (Hyōgo)
