= Awaji, Hyōgo =

Awaji 淡路市
- City
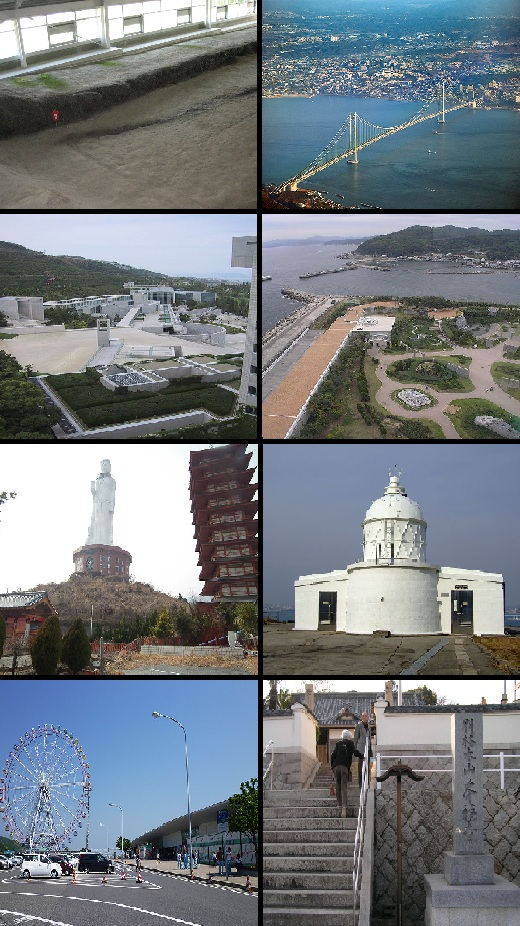
- Top left:Nojima Fault, Top right:Akashi Strait Bridge and side of Honshu, 2nd left:Awaji Dream Stage theme park, 2nd right:Onokoro Theme Park, 3rd left:Peace Statue in Awaji Kannon Temple, 3rd right:Esaki Lighthouse, Bottom left:View of Ferriwheel in Awaji rest-house, Bottom right:Entrance in Honbuku Temple

- Flag Emblem

- Location of Awaji in Hyōgo Prefecture

- Location in Japan
- Coordinates: 34°26′N 134°55′E
- Country: Japan
- Region: Kansai
- Prefecture: Hyōgo

Government
  - Mayor: Atsuhiro Toda (戸田敦大) from May 2025

Area
  - Total: 184.32 km^{2} (71.17 sq mi)

Population (June 1, 2022)
  - Total: 42,597
  - Density: 231.10/km^{2} (598.56/sq mi)
- Time zone: UTC+09:00 (JST)
- City hall address: 8 Ikuhoniijima, Awaji-shi, Hyōgo-ken 656-2292
- Website: Official website
- Symbols
- Bird: Plover
- Flower: Carnation
- Tree: Prunus serrulata

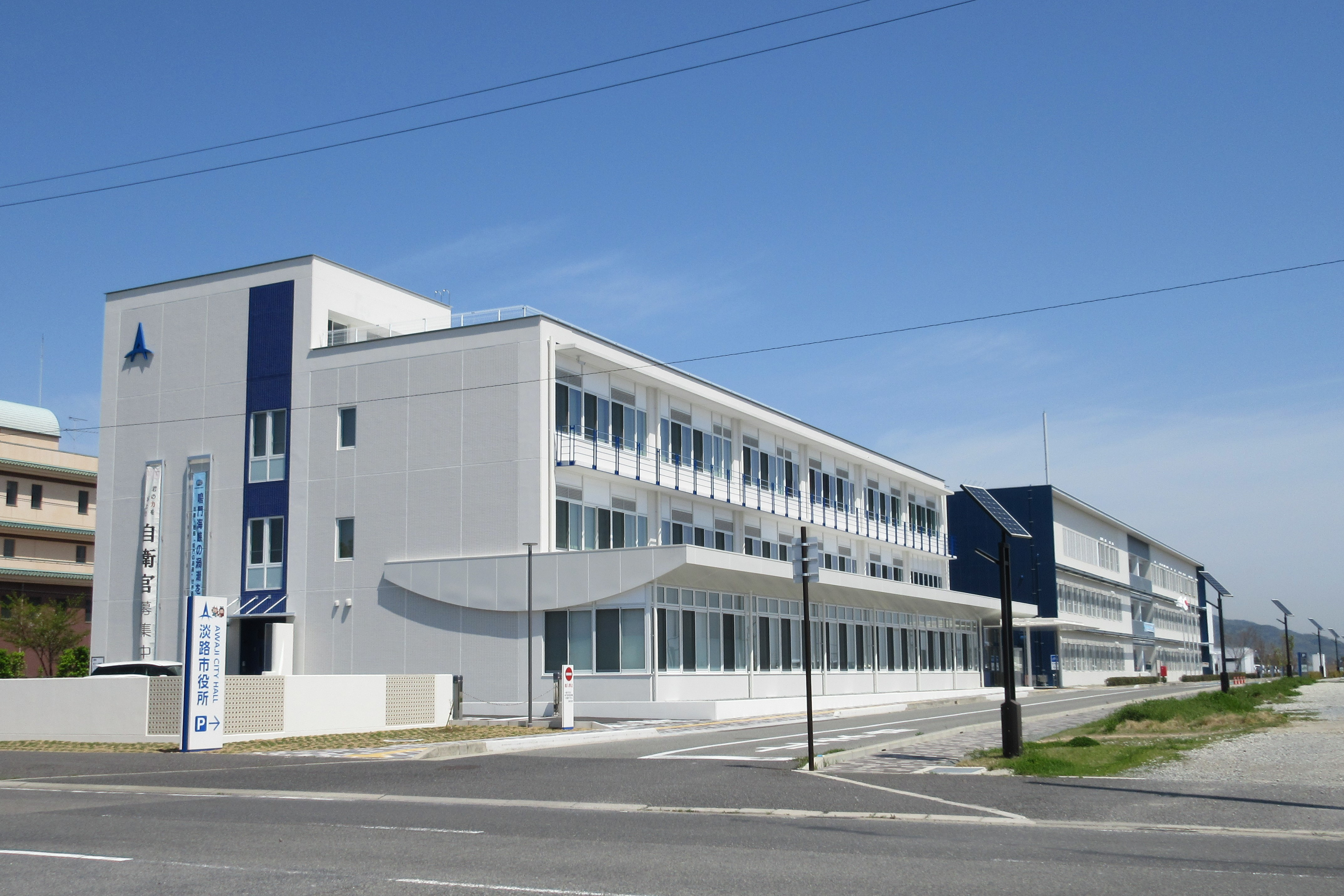
Awaji City Hall

Awaji (淡路市, Awaji-shi; Japanese pronunciation: [ä́.β̞ä̀.(ɟ͡)ʑì, ä̀.β̞ä́.(ɟ͡)ʑí.ɕì]) is a city located on Awaji Island in Hyōgo Prefecture, Japan. As of 1 June 2022, the city had an estimated population of 42,597 and a population density of 230 persons per km^{2}. The total area of the city is 184.32 square kilometres (71.17 sq mi).

== Geography ==
The city of Awaji occupies the northern third of Awaji Island. It is connected to Kobe City to the north by the Akashi Kaikyo Bridge, and is sandwiched between Osaka Bay and the Gulf of Harima on the Seto Inland Sea. There are no large rivers in the city, but there are many agricultural ponds. The Tsuna hills run through the center of the city, with Mount Myoken (522 meters) as the highest point. The Nojima Fault (the focus of the Great Hanshin earthquake) is located in the city.

=== Surrounding municipalities ===
Hyogo Prefecture

- Sumoto

=== Climate ===
Awaji has a humid subtropical climate (Köppen Cfa) characterized by warm summers and cool winters with light to no snowfall. The average annual temperature in Awaji is 16.3 °C. The average annual rainfall is 1600 mm with September as the wettest month. The temperatures are highest on average in August, at around 26.6 °C, and lowest in January, at around 6.6 °C.

Climate data for Awaji (1991–2020 normals, extremes 1978–present)
Month	Jan	Feb	Mar	Apr	May	Jun	Jul	Aug	Sep	Oct	Nov	Dec	Year
Record high °C (°F)	20.8 (69.4)	22.0 (71.6)	26.7 (80.1)	28.7 (83.7)	31.4 (88.5)	35.5 (95.9)	38.0 (100.4)	38.8 (101.8)	36.9 (98.4)	31.1 (88.0)	25.8 (78.4)	23.6 (74.5)	38.8 (101.8)
Mean daily maximum °C (°F)	9.3 (48.7)	9.7 (49.5)	12.8 (55.0)	18.6 (65.5)	23.1 (73.6)	26.4 (79.5)	30.3 (86.5)	31.9 (89.4)	28.3 (82.9)	22.7 (72.9)	17.3 (63.1)	12.1 (53.8)	20.2 (68.4)
Daily mean °C (°F)	5.6 (42.1)	5.7 (42.3)	8.4 (47.1)	13.6 (56.5)	18.2 (64.8)	22.2 (72.0)	26.2 (79.2)	27.4 (81.3)	24.0 (75.2)	18.2 (64.8)	12.9 (55.2)	8.1 (46.6)	15.9 (60.6)
Mean daily minimum °C (°F)	1.5 (34.7)	1.4 (34.5)	3.6 (38.5)	8.4 (47.1)	13.4 (56.1)	18.5 (65.3)	22.9 (73.2)	23.8 (74.8)	20.2 (68.4)	13.8 (56.8)	8.4 (47.1)	3.8 (38.8)	11.7 (53.1)
Record low °C (°F)	−5.1 (22.8)	−5.2 (22.6)	−3.7 (25.3)	−0.9 (30.4)	3.8 (38.8)	9.4 (48.9)	16.6 (61.9)	16.7 (62.1)	10.0 (50.0)	3.9 (39.0)	0.3 (32.5)	−4.3 (24.3)	−5.2 (22.6)
Average precipitation mm (inches)	33.8 (1.33)	50.2 (1.98)	82.7 (3.26)	89.3 (3.52)	120.9 (4.76)	157.5 (6.20)	115.7 (4.56)	89.2 (3.51)	145.1 (5.71)	101.1 (3.98)	69.1 (2.72)	38.7 (1.52)	1,093.1 (43.04)
Average precipitation days (≥ 1.0 mm)	5.8	6.2	9.9	9.0	9.4	11.6	9.6	5.9	9.7	8.1	6.2	5.7	97.1
Mean monthly sunshine hours	140.9	152.4	180.3	201.4	200.5	163.7	198.8	240.1	173.3	172.2	147.2	141.4	2,110.3
Source: Japan Meteorological Agency

== Demographics ==
Per Japanese census data, the population of Awaji has been declining steadily over the past 70 years.

Historical population
Year	Pop.	±%
1920	69,948	—
1930	69,667	−0.4%
1940	67,926	−2.5%
1950	82,874	+22.0%
1960	71,378	−13.9%
1970	61,675	−13.6%
1980	57,650	−6.5%
1990	54,643	−5.2%
2000	51,884	−5.0%
2010	46,465	−10.4%

== History ==
The city of Awaji is situated in ancient Awaji Province. It was ruled as part of Tokushima Domain during the Edo period. After the Meiji restoration, it became part of Tsuna District, Hyōgo. The town of Iwaya was established with the creation of the modern municipalities system April 1, 1889. On April 1, 1956, Iwaya merged with the neighboring town of Kariya and the villages of Url and Hamaguchi to form the town of Awaji; however, on June 19, 1961, a portion of the town was separated to form the town of Higashiura. On April 1, 2005, Awaji and Higashiura merged back together, along with the towns of Tsuna, Hokudan and Ichinomiya to form the city of Awaji.

== Government ==
Awaji has a mayor-council form of government with a directly elected mayor and a unicameral city council of 18 members. Awaji contributes one member to the Hyogo Prefectural Assembly. In terms of national politics, the city is part of Hyōgo 9th district of the lower house of the Diet of Japan.

== Economy ==
The local economy is largely rural, and is based on agriculture and commercial fishing. Awaji has traditionally been famous for its production of joss sticks, which in the early 1960s accounted for 70% of the Japanese domestic market. The production of roof tiles is also a local speciality.

== Education ==
Awaji has 11 public elementary schools and five public middle schools operated by the city government and two public high schools operated by the Hyōgo Prefectural Department of Education. There are also two private high schools. The Kansai University of Nursing and Health Sciences is located in Awaji.

The Ashiya University Awajishima Seaside Seminar Center, Kobe University Inland Sea Environment Education and Research Center and University of Hyogo Graduate School of Green Environment and Landscape Management are all located in Awaji.

The Awaji City Library serves Awaji. In 1999 this library and the West Bloomfield Library in West Bloomfield, Michigan in Metro Detroit were paired as sister institutions.

== Transportation ==
=== Railway ===
Awaji does not have any passenger rail service.

=== Highways ===
- Kobe-Awaji-Naruto Expressway
- National Route 28

=== Air ===
There is no airport on Awaji Island. The nearest airports are located in mainland Kansai and Shikoku:

- Kobe Airport
- Kansai International Airport
- Tokushima Airport

=== Other ===
Jointly with Minami Awaji and Sumoto, the city operates a low-cost electric bike rental scheme, designed to attract visitors to stay for more than one day in order to explore the island.

== Sister cities ==
- Paranaguá, Paraná, Brazil, since May 29, 1986
- St. Marys, Ohio, United States, since August 3, 2006

== Local attractions ==
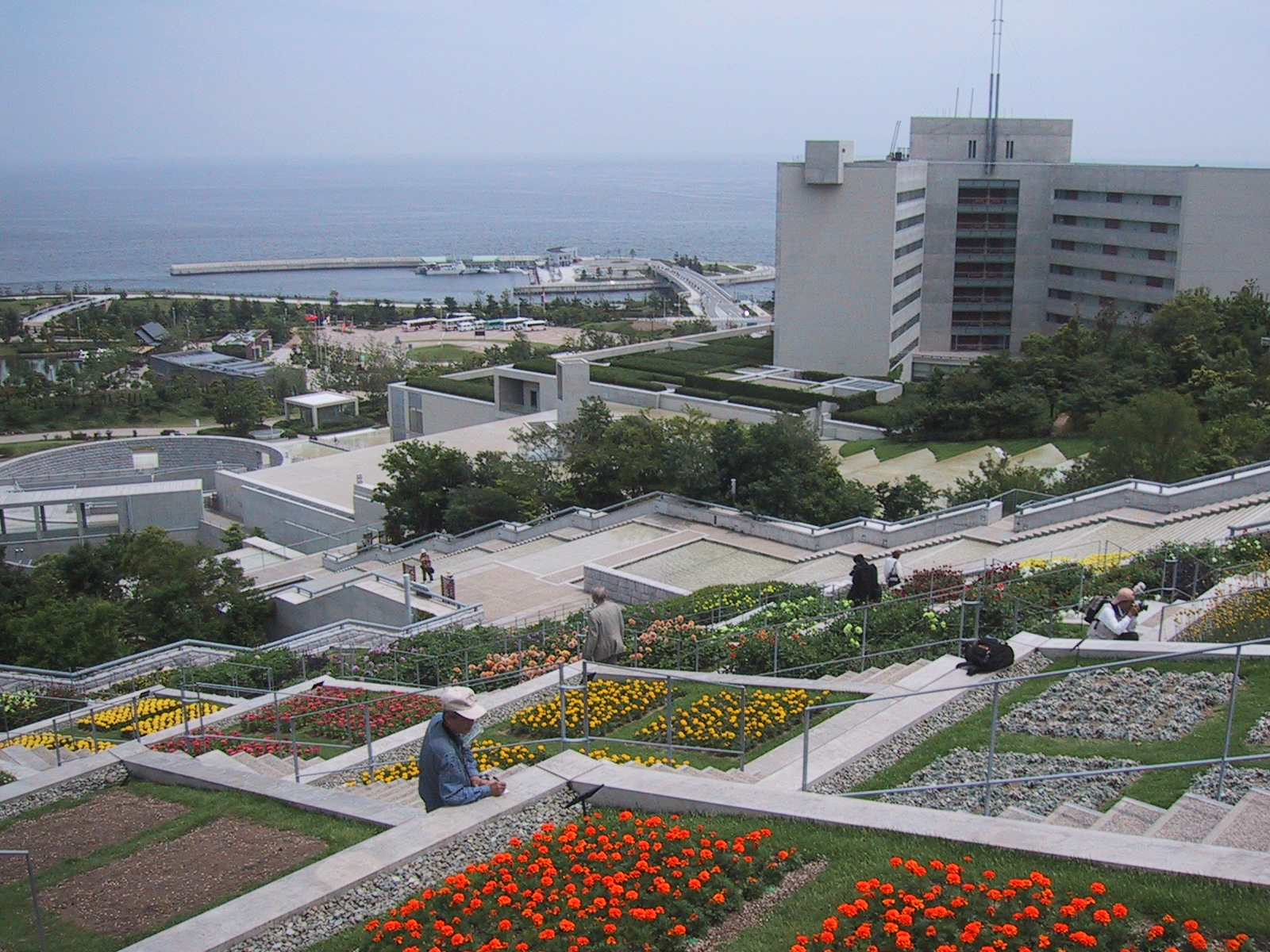
Awaji Yumebutai

- Akashi Kaikyo Bridge
- Akashi Kaikyo National Government Park
- Awaji World Park Onokoro
- Awaji Yumebutai (Kiseki No Hoshi Greenhouse)
- Esaki Lighthouse
- Funaki Site, National Historic Site
- Gossa Kaito Site, National Historic Site
- Honpuku-ji Temple
- Izanagi Jingū, ichinomiya of Awaji Province
- Matsuho Battery Site, National Historic Site
- Nijigen no Mori

== Notable people from Awaji ==
- Toshio Iue, inventor and industrialist
- Takashi Sasano, actor
- Tetsuya Watari, actor
- Harukichi Yamaguchi, yakuza
