= Maiko Battery =

Akashi Domain Maiko Battery
- 明石藩舞子台場跡 (Japanese)
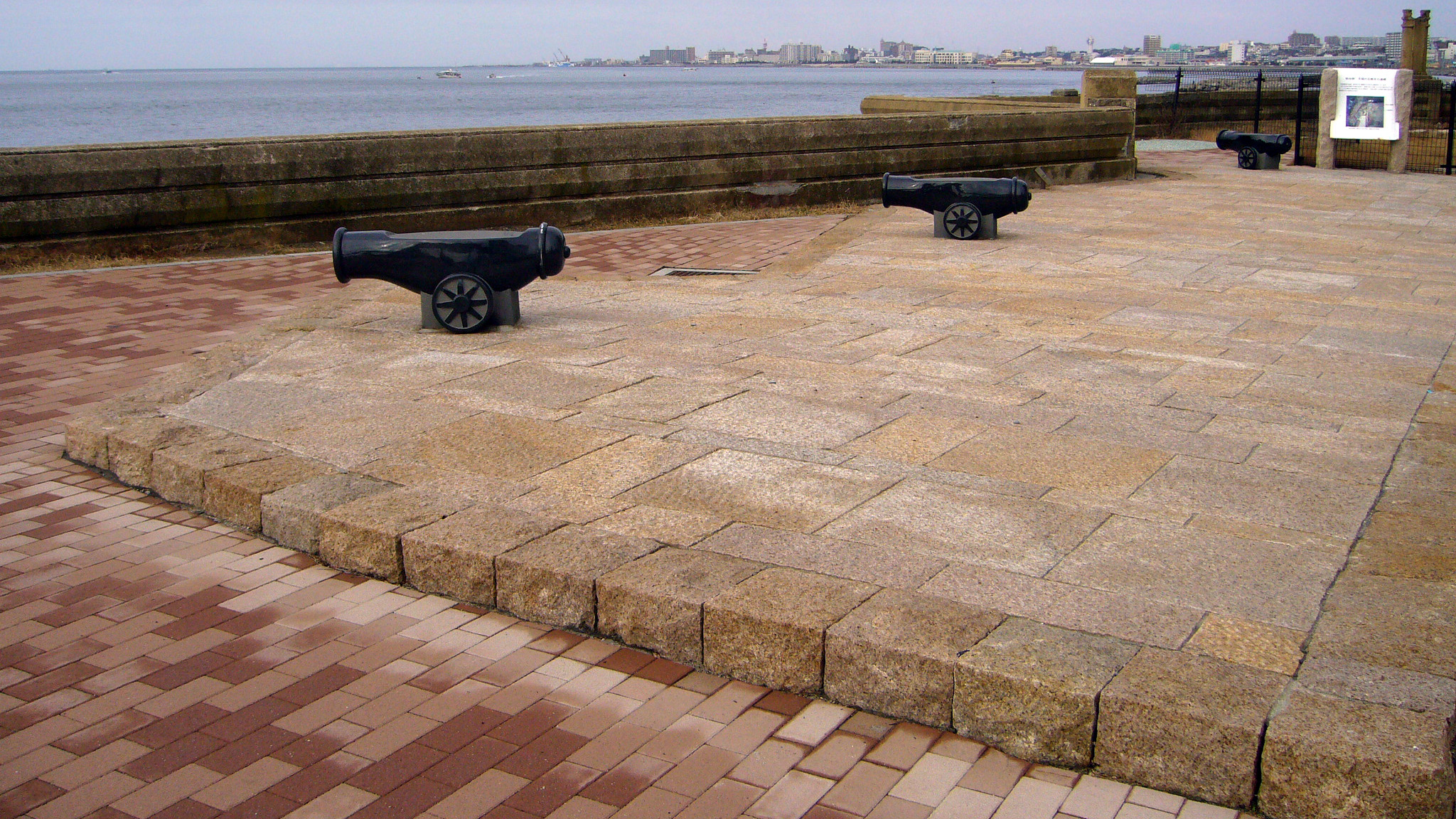
- Akashi Domain Maiko Battery Site

- Location within Hyōgo Prefecture Location within Japan
- 34°37′58.5″N 135°1′56.2″E
- Type: fortification
- Location: Tarumi-ku, Kobe, Japan

History
- Built: 1863-1865
- Demolished: 1871
- National Historic Site of Japan

The Akashi Domain Maiko Battery (明石藩舞子台場跡, Akashi-han Maiko Daiba-ato) was a Bakumatsu period coastal artillery battery erected by Akashi Domain on the Seto Inland Sea coast of what is now Tarumi-ku, Kobe, Hyōgo Prefecture in the Kansai region of Japan. The ruins were designated a National Historic Site in 2007. It is also called the Maiko Hōdai-ato (舞子砲台跡) after its location on Kaji Bay.

== Background ==
In the late Edo period, the Tokugawa shogunate was increasing alarmed by incursions by foreign ships into Japanese territorial waters, fearing that these kurofune warships of the United States or other Western powers would attempt to end Japan's self-imposed national isolation policy by force, or would attempt an invasion of Japan by landing hostile military forces. Numerous feudal domains were ordered to establish fortifications along their coastlines with shore artillery located at strategic locations. The most critical locations were perceived to be at Edo Bay, where the shogunal capital was situated, and Osaka Bay, which controlled the seaward approaches to the imperial capital of Kyoto. The daimyō of Akashi Domain, Matsudaira Yoshinori was a strong supporter of the shogunate, and was ordered by Shogun Tokugawa Iemochi in 1863 to construct a fortification to control the Akashi Strait, between mainland Honshu and Awaji Island, which was then northern approach to Osaka. The design of the fortification was by Katsu Kaishū, who supervised the construction with the assistance of the nearby Kobe Naval Training Center. Construction was completed by 1865. A similar fortification, the Tokushima Domain Matsuho Battery (徳島藩松帆台場跡, Tokushima-han Matsuho Daiba-ato) was constructed on Awaji Island to control the Akashi Strait from the opposite side.

== Design ==
The Maiko battery was a half-star bastion fort with granite stone walls. According to contemporary accounts, there were 15 gun ports along a width of about 70 meters and a height of about 10 meters. The rampart was in the form of a redan with five circular gates in the rear. Per an archaeological excavation conducted in 2003, the remains were found to be in good condition, although the height of the remaining stone walls was no more than six meters as the upper part was removed due to a fire at the end of the Meiji period. The site was largely backfilled for preservation, and only a small part is now exposed on the ground surface. The site is part of Hyōgo Prefectural Maiko Park and is a three-minute walk from Maiko Station on the JR West San'yō Main Line.

== See also ==
- List of Historic Sites of Japan (Hyōgo)
