= Tsuna District =

Former district in Hyōgo prefecture, Japan

Coordinates: 34.383°N 134.836°E

Tsuna (津名郡, Tsuna-gun) was a district located in Hyōgo Prefecture, Japan.

As of 2005, the district had an estimated population of 11,500, and the total area was 58.21 km^{2}.

== Former towns and villages ==
- Awaji
- Goshiki
- Higashiura
- Hokudan
- Ichinomiya
- Tsuna

== Mergers ==
- On April 1, 2005 - the former town of Awaji absorbed the towns of Higashiura, Hokudan, Ichinomiya and Tsuna to create the city of Awaji.
- On February 11, 2006 - the town of Goshiki was merged into the expanded city of Sumoto. Tsuna District was dissolved as a result of this merger.
