= Funaki Site =

- 舟木遺跡 (Japanese)
- Funaki Site Funaki Site (Japan)
- 34°32′35″N 134°57′13″E
- Type: settlement
- Periods: Yayoi period
- Location: Awaji, Hyōgo, Japan
- Region: Kansai region

History
- Built: 1st-3rd century AD

Site notes
- Public access: Yes (park, museum)
- National Historic Site of Japan

The Funaki Site (舟木遺跡) is an archaeological site located in the Funaki neighborhood of the city of Awaji, Hyōgo in the Kansai region of Japan, with the traces of a late Yayoi period settlement. The site was designated a National Historic Site of Japan in 2021.

== Overview ==
The site is located in a hilly area at an elevation of 150 meters in northern Awaji Island and occupies an area of approximately 500 meters east-to-west by 800 meters north-to-south. It was discovered in 1996 when a local elementary student discovered fragments of Yayoi pottery. Archaeological excavations conducted since 2016 have found the foundations of 20 large pit-house dwellings and a large amount of pottery used for salt making, as well as fishing weights. Also, fragments of a 2nd-century Chinese-made bronze mirror and shards of painted pottery have been found. The settlement is estimated to date from the first half of the 1st century to the first half of the 3rd century.

== See also ==
- List of Historic Sites of Japan (Hyōgo)
