= Ishiyagawa Depot =

Japanese traction maintenance depot

Coordinates: 34°42′41.2″N 135°14′41.2″E

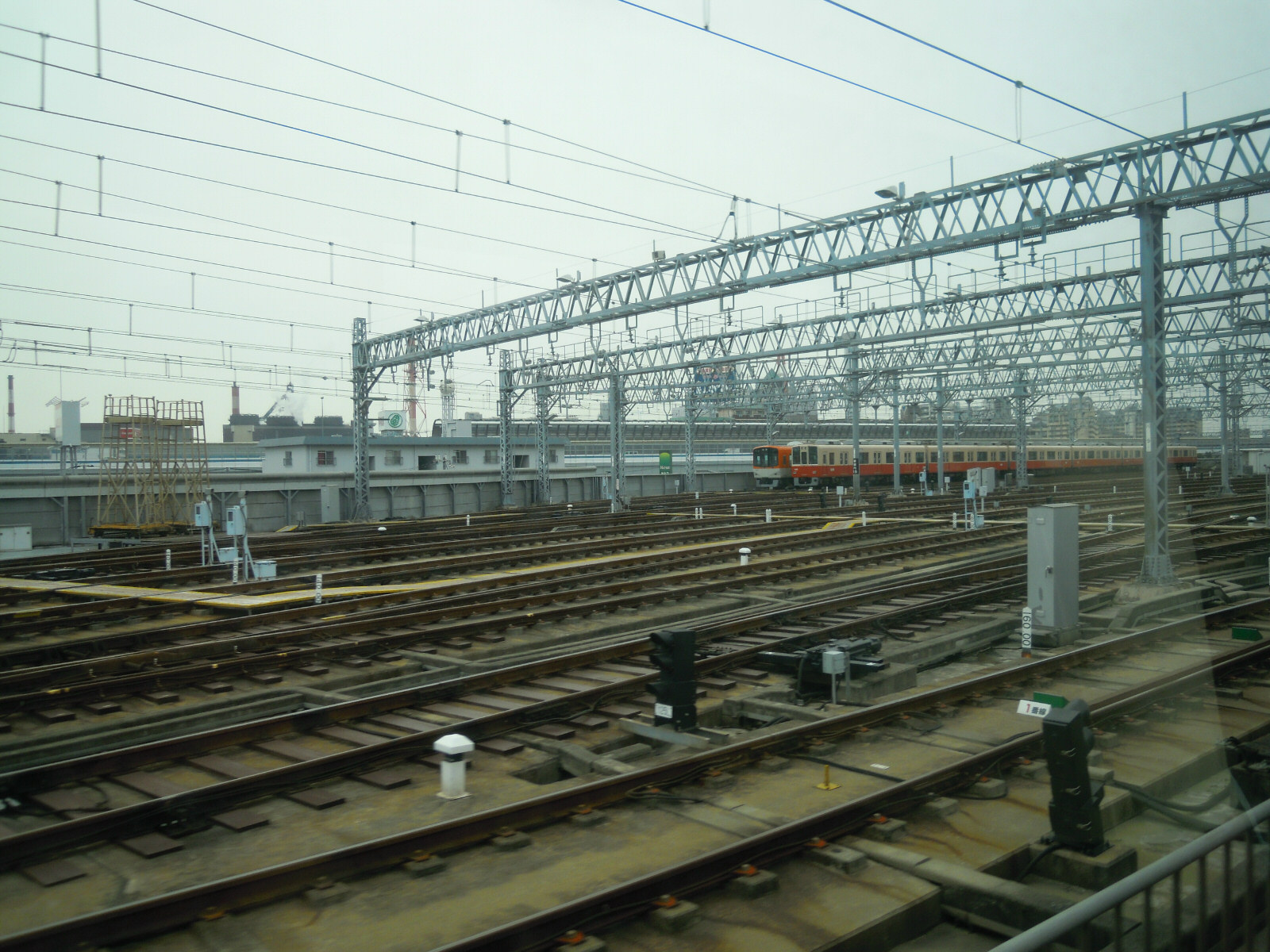
The Ishiyagawa Depot as viewed from a passing train

Ishiyagawa Train Depot (石屋川車庫, Ishiyagawa shako) of the Hanshin Electric Railway is a Japanese traction maintenance depot situated between Ishiyagawa and Shinzaike stations of the Hanshin Main Line. It is situated in Higashinada Ward, Kobe, Hyogo Prefecture.

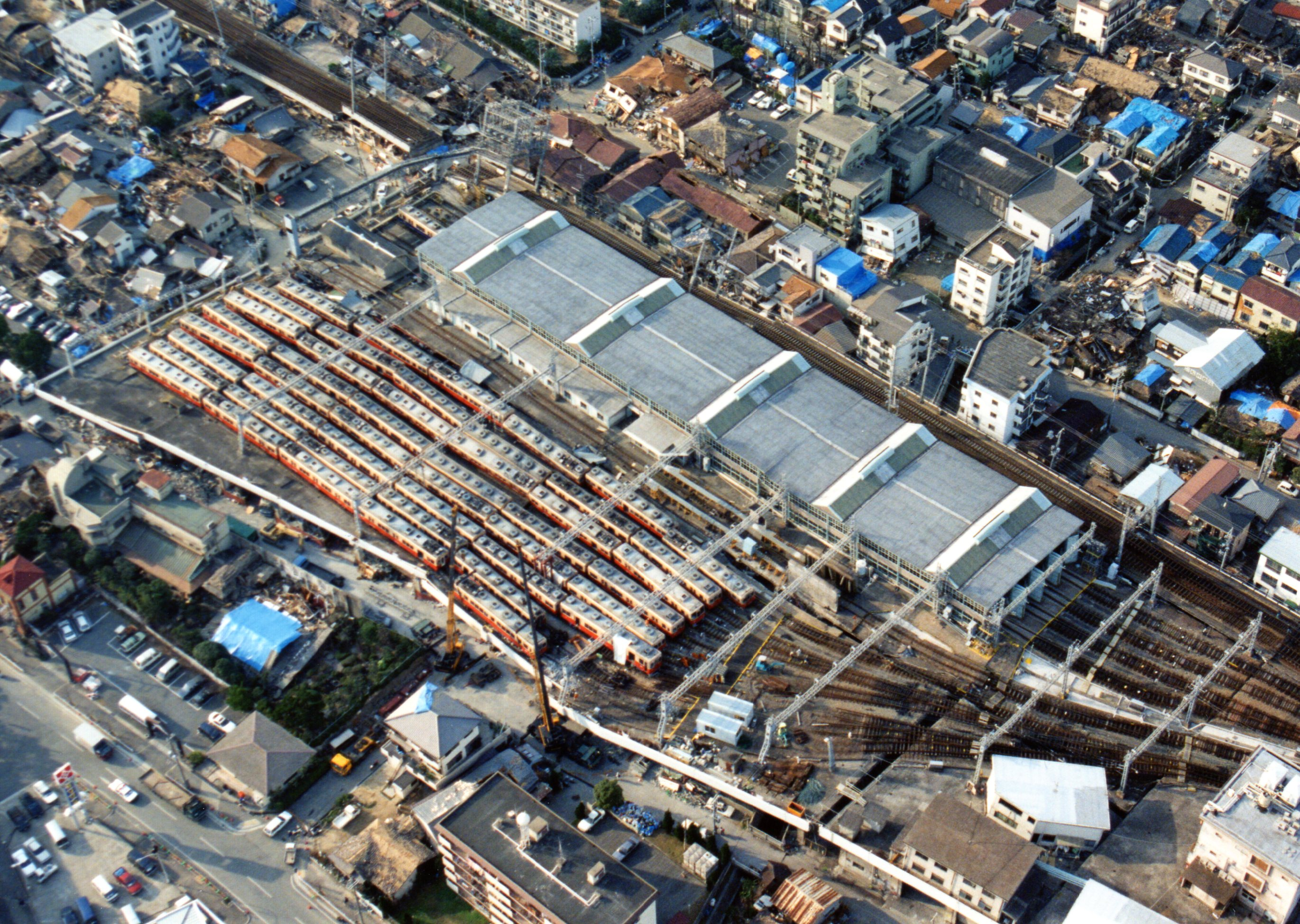
Aerial view of the depot several days after the 1995 Kobe earthquake

== History ==
Initially there was a depot next to Shinzaike station, but it was closed in July 1967 when the line from Ishiyagawa to Nishinada was grade-separated by elevating it. The new depot at Ishiyagawa was opened on 18 April 1968 and was the first elevated train depot in Japan, being built out of reinforced concrete. At the ground level there was a Sumitomo Rubber Industries facility.

The original structure collapsed in the aftermath of the Great Hanshin earthquake on 17 January 1995, which occurred at 5:46 in the morning. Aside from disruptions caused on the Hanshin Main Line, 58 cars stabled at the depot were also damaged and 24 had to be scrapped after being declared damaged beyond repair. The depot was then closed for repairs until the original structure was cleared out and replaced with a new one, which opened on 20 March 1996. With this reconstruction, the capacity of cars that can fit in the depot increased from 76 to 84. After this, the ground level was occupied by Konan Shoji, then Kojima Co. Ltd, before finally hosting two different stores (Hankyu Oasis and Sugi Pharmacy respectively).

The depot also hosts trains of the Sanyo Electric Railway and those of Kinki Nippon Railway.
