= Matsuho Battery Site =

Tokushima Domain Matsuho Battery
- 徳島藩松帆台場跡 (Japanese)
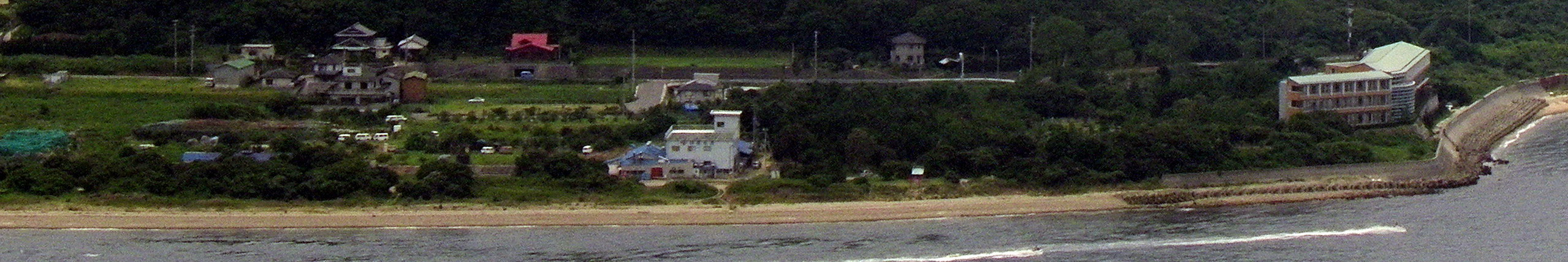
- Tokushima Domain Matsuho Battery Site

- Location within Hyōgo Prefecture Location within Japan
- 34°36′29.8″N 135°0′10.6″E
- Type: fortification
- Location: Awaji, Hyōgo, Japan

History
- Built: 1858–1861
- Demolished: 1871
- National Historic Site of Japan

The Tokushima Domain Matsuho Battery (徳島藩松帆台場跡, Tokushima-han Matsuho Daiba-ato) was a Bakumatsu period coastal artillery battery erected by Tokushima Domain on the Seto Inland Sea coast of what is now the Iwaya neighborhood of the city of Awaji, Hyōgo Prefecture in the Kansai region of Japan. The ruins were designated a National Historic Site in 2006, with the area under protection extended in 2011

== Background ==
In the late Edo period, the Tokugawa shogunate was increasing alarmed by incursions by foreign ships into Japanese territorial waters, fearing that these kurofune warships of the United States or other Western powers would attempt to end Japan's self-imposed national isolation policy by force, or would attempt an invasion of Japan by landing hostile military forces. Numerous feudal domains were ordered to establish fortifications along their coastlines with shore artillery located at strategic locations. The most critical locations were perceived to be at Edo Bay, where the shogunal capital was situated, and Osaka Bay, which controlled the seaward approaches to the imperial capital of Kyoto. The daimyō of Tokushima Domain, Hachisuka Narihiro was a strong proponent of western military modernization and coastal defenses, and was authorized by Shogun Tokugawa Iemochi in to construct fortifications in his domains in 1858. This included what became the Yura Fortress controlling the Kii Channel and entrance to the Seto Inland Sea, as well as the Matsuho Battery, which controlled the Akashi Strait, between mainland Honshu and Awaji Island, which was then northern approach to Osaka. Construction was completed by 1861. A similar fortification, the Akashi Domain Maiko Battery (徳島藩松帆台場跡, Akashi-han Maiko Daiba-ato) was constructed on the coast of Honshu to control the Akashi Strait from the opposite side.

The Matsuho Battery was never used in combat against the kurofune, but in July 1863 it mistakenly opened fire on the Shogunate Navy corvette Chōyō Maru, damaging her rudder. The commander of the Matsuho Battery, Nagasawa Mitsutomo, was forced to commit seppuku over the incident.

== Design ==
The Matsuho battery was M-shaped, with two triangular protrusions on the seaside, and a rampart was in the form of a redan to the rear. It was equipped with 13 cannon and a garrison of around 70 samurai. Facilities such as a gunpowder magazine and training grounds were located inside the bastion. On the south side of the bastion was a small harbor in which was moored a small ship equipped with a ram, intended to intercept enemies at sea that the cannon at the Matsuho Battery could not reach. The harbor was in the form of a parallelogram with a northeastern side extending approximately 43 meters and a southeastern side extending 41.5 meters, and was about 4 meters deep, with a quay made of granite blocks.

== See also ==
- List of Historic Sites of Japan (Hyōgo)
