= Sumoto =

Sumoto 洲本市
- City
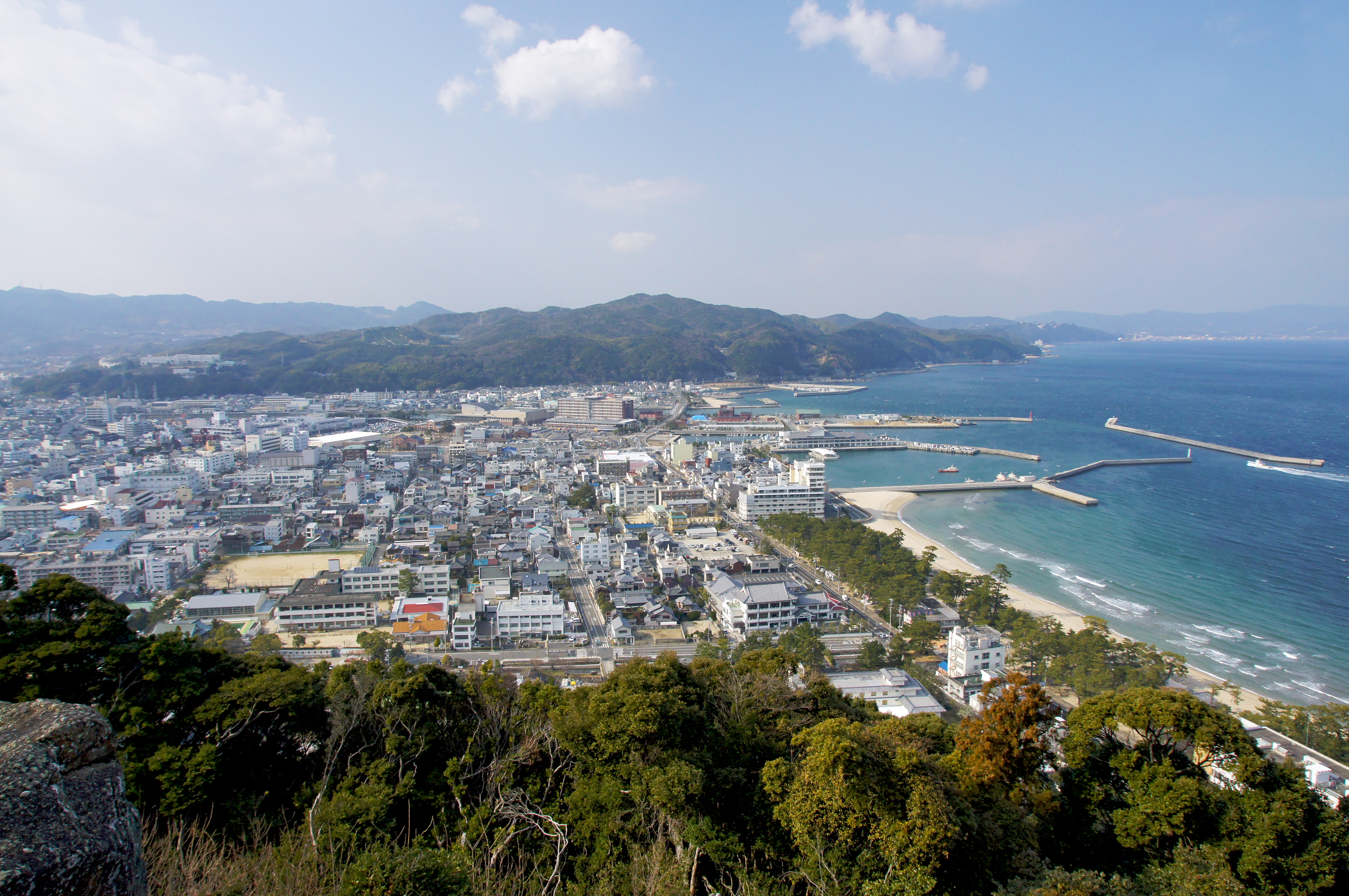

- Flag Seal

- Location of Sumoto in Hyōgo Prefecture

- Location in Japan
- Coordinates: 34°21′N 134°54′E
- Country: Japan
- Region: Kansai
- Prefecture: Hyōgo

Government
  - Mayor: Toshitaka Yoshihira (吉平敏孝) from March 2026

Area
  - Total: 182.38 km^{2} (70.42 sq mi)

Population (April 30, 2022)
  - Total: 42,094
  - Density: 230.80/km^{2} (597.78/sq mi)
- Time zone: UTC+09:00 (JST)
- City hall address: 3-4-10 Honmachi, Sumoto-shi, Hyōgo-ken 656-8686
- Climate: Cfa
- Website: Official website
- Symbols
- Bird: Plover
- Fish: Japanese Spanish mackerel (Scomberomorus niphonius)
- Flower: Narcissus and Rapeseed
- Tree: Pine

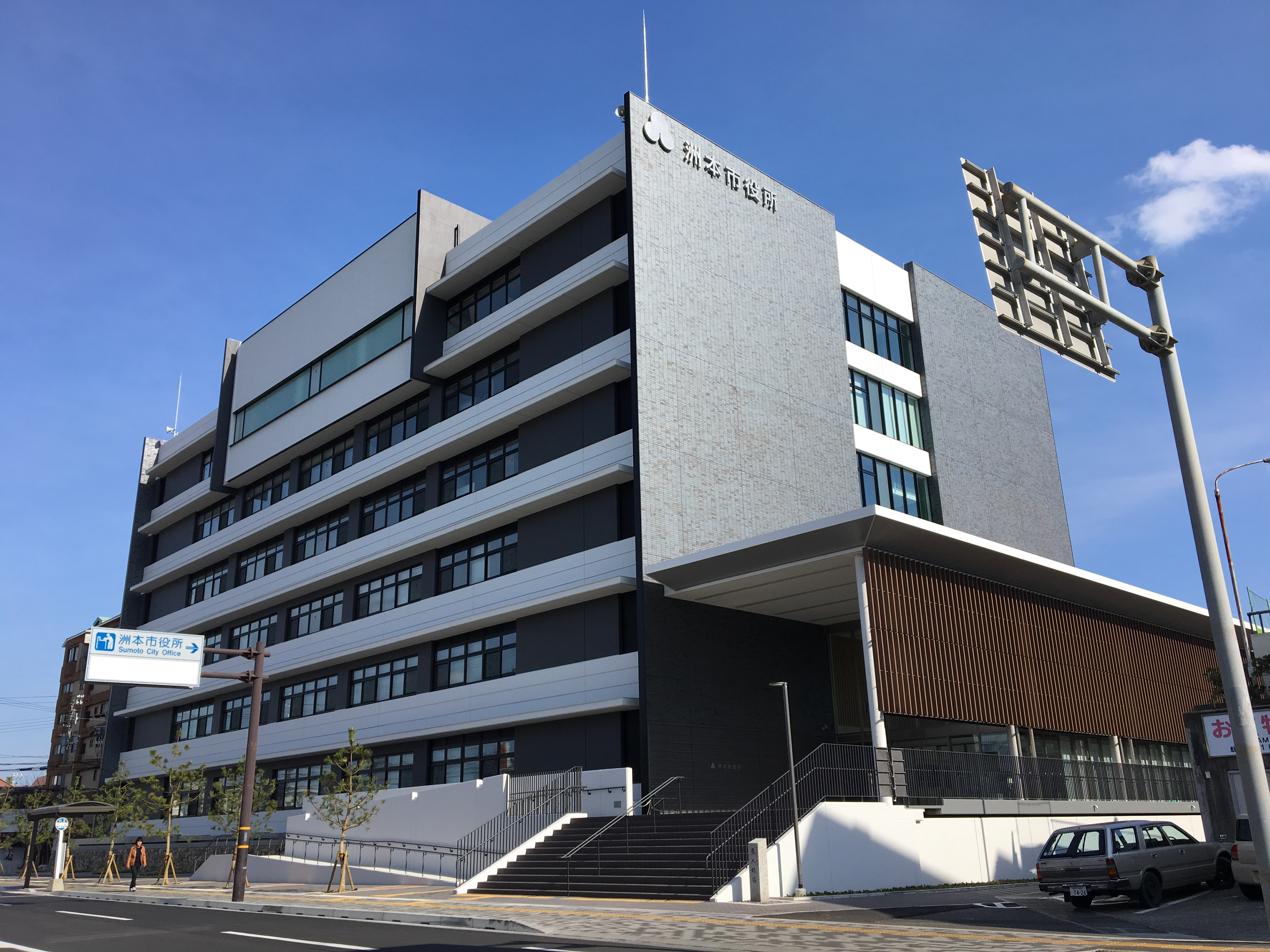
Sumoto City Hall

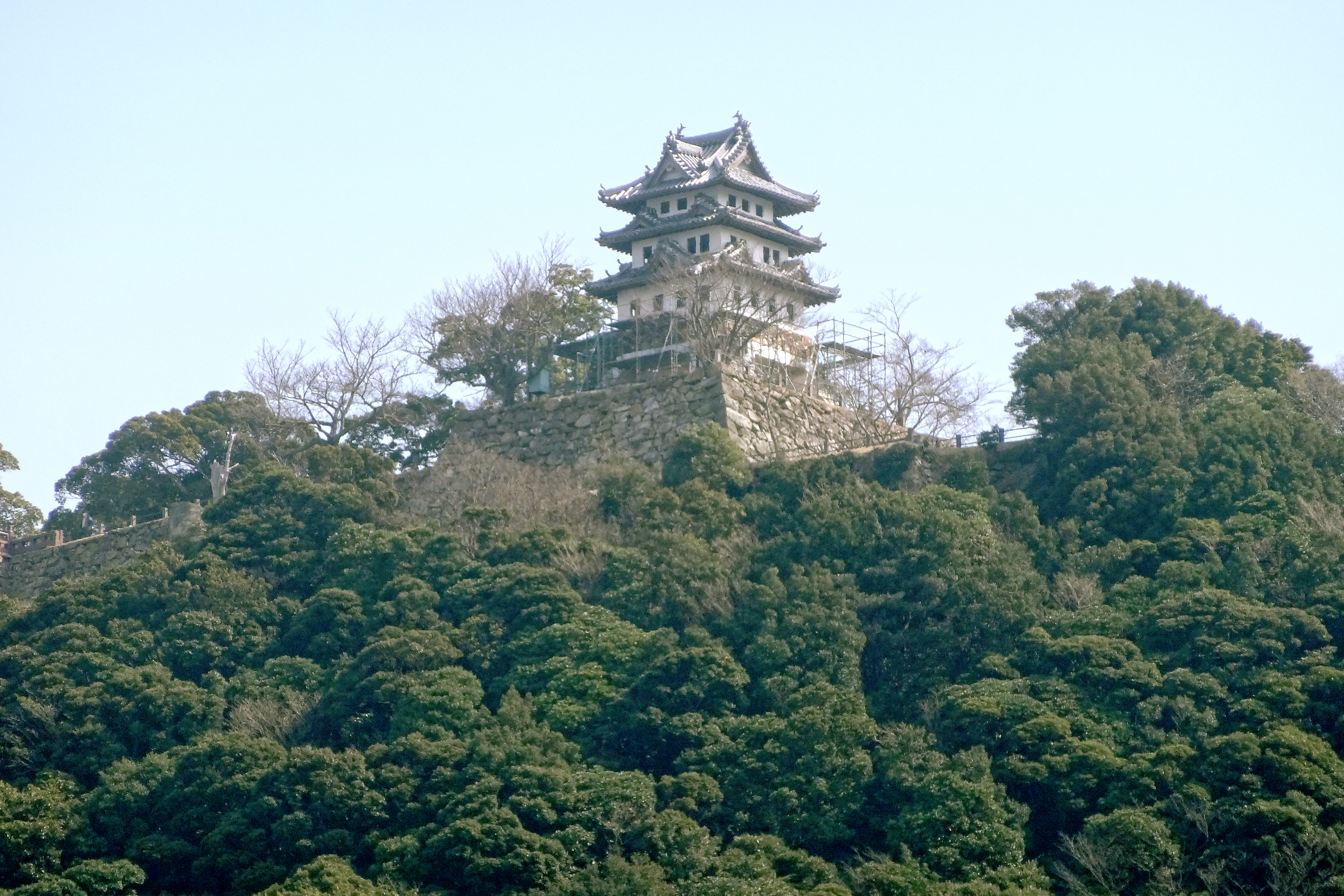
Sumoto Castle

Sumoto (洲本市, Sumoto-shi) is a city located on Awaji Island, Hyōgo Prefecture, Japan. As of 1 June 2022, the city had an estimated population of 42,094 and a population density of 230 persons per km². The total area of the city is 182.38 square kilometres (70.42 sq mi).

== Geography ==
The city of Sumoto occupies the middle of Awaji Island, sandwiched between Awaji and Minamiawaji. with the Gulf of Harima on the Seto Inland Sea to the west and Osaka Bay to the east. The Sumoto River flows into Osaka Bay in the center of the city area, part of which are within the borders of the Setonaikai National Park

=== Surrounding municipalities ===
Hyogo Prefecture

- Awaji
- Minamiawaji

=== Climate ===
Sumoto has a humid subtropical climate (Köppen climate classification Cfa) with hot summers and cool winters. Precipitation is significant throughout the year, but is somewhat lower in the winter.

Climate data for Sumoto, Hyōgo (1991−2020 normals, extremes 1919−present)
Month	Jan	Feb	Mar	Apr	May	Jun	Jul	Aug	Sep	Oct	Nov	Dec	Year
Record high °C (°F)	19.5 (67.1)	22.2 (72.0)	24.4 (75.9)	28.3 (82.9)	32.2 (90.0)	34.5 (94.1)	38.0 (100.4)	39.3 (102.7)	36.2 (97.2)	31.0 (87.8)	26.5 (79.7)	21.8 (71.2)	39.3 (102.7)
Mean maximum °C (°F)	13.7 (56.7)	15.9 (60.6)	19.6 (67.3)	24.4 (75.9)	27.5 (81.5)	30.4 (86.7)	33.4 (92.1)	33.8 (92.8)	31.4 (88.5)	26.5 (79.7)	21.3 (70.3)	16.9 (62.4)	34.2 (93.6)
Mean daily maximum °C (°F)	8.5 (47.3)	9.2 (48.6)	12.7 (54.9)	18.2 (64.8)	22.7 (72.9)	25.5 (77.9)	29.4 (84.9)	31.0 (87.8)	27.0 (80.6)	21.5 (70.7)	16.2 (61.2)	11.1 (52.0)	19.4 (66.9)
Daily mean °C (°F)	5.4 (41.7)	5.6 (42.1)	8.6 (47.5)	13.7 (56.7)	18.3 (64.9)	21.7 (71.1)	25.6 (78.1)	26.9 (80.4)	23.5 (74.3)	18.3 (64.9)	13.1 (55.6)	8.0 (46.4)	15.7 (60.3)
Mean daily minimum °C (°F)	2.6 (36.7)	2.5 (36.5)	5.0 (41.0)	9.8 (49.6)	14.6 (58.3)	18.8 (65.8)	23.0 (73.4)	24.1 (75.4)	20.8 (69.4)	15.6 (60.1)	10.2 (50.4)	5.2 (41.4)	12.7 (54.9)
Mean minimum °C (°F)	−1.2 (29.8)	−1.2 (29.8)	0.7 (33.3)	3.7 (38.7)	9.5 (49.1)	14.7 (58.5)	19.6 (67.3)	20.8 (69.4)	16.2 (61.2)	10.6 (51.1)	5.0 (41.0)	1.0 (33.8)	−1.9 (28.6)
Record low °C (°F)	−5.2 (22.6)	−6.1 (21.0)	−4.0 (24.8)	0.1 (32.2)	5.5 (41.9)	9.5 (49.1)	15.5 (59.9)	16.9 (62.4)	12.1 (53.8)	5.8 (42.4)	0.7 (33.3)	−3.0 (26.6)	−6.1 (21.0)
Average precipitation mm (inches)	48.2 (1.90)	67.1 (2.64)	109.0 (4.29)	117.5 (4.63)	145.0 (5.71)	198.2 (7.80)	182.2 (7.17)	117.0 (4.61)	223.6 (8.80)	185.6 (7.31)	91.5 (3.60)	75.1 (2.96)	1,559.9 (61.41)
Average snowfall cm (inches)	1 (0.4)	1 (0.4)	0 (0)	0 (0)	0 (0)	0 (0)	0 (0)	0 (0)	0 (0)	0 (0)	0 (0)	0 (0)	2 (0.8)
Average precipitation days (≥ 0.5 mm)	7.5	7.8	10.7	10.5	10.4	12.7	10.8	7.3	10.9	9.8	7.7	7.9	114.1
Average snowy days (≥ 1 cm)	0.3	0.4	0	0	0	0	0	0	0	0	0	0.1	0.8
Average relative humidity (%)	68	68	68	69	72	80	82	78	78	75	72	69	73
Mean monthly sunshine hours	138.9	146.4	183.1	201.4	208.9	158.5	197.1	232.1	165.7	163.8	139.9	133.9	2,069.8
Source: JMA

== Demographics ==
Per Japanese census data, the population of Sumoto has been declining steadily over the past 60 years.

Historical population
Year	Pop.	±%
1960	62,632	—
1970	56,171	−10.3%
1980	54,826	−2.4%
1990	54,049	−1.4%
2000	52,248	−3.3%
2010	47,271	−9.5%

== History ==
The city of Sumoto is situated in ancient Awaji Province, and developed as a castle town around the Muromachi period Sumoto Castle. It was ruled as part of Tokushima Domain during the Edo period. After the Meiji restoration, it became part of Tsuna District, Hyōgo. The town of Sumoto was established with the creation of the modern municipalities system April 1, 1889. It was raised to city status on February 11, 1940. On February 11, 2006, the town of Goshiki (from Tsuna District) was merged into Sumoto.

== Government ==
Sumoto has a mayor-council form of government with a directly elected mayor and a unicameral city council of 18 members. Sumoto contributes one member to the Hyogo Prefectural Assembly. In terms of national politics, the city is part of Hyōgo 9th district of the lower house of the Diet of Japan.

== Economy ==
The local economy is largely rural, and is based on agriculture and commercial fishing. Sumoto has traditionally been famous for its production of Awaji onions, Naruto oranges and Kobe Beef.

== Education ==
Sumoto has 13 public elementary schools and five public middle schools operated by the city government and two public high schools operated by the Hyōgo Prefectural Department of Education. The city also operates one combined elementary/middle school. There are also one private combined middle/high school.

== Transportation ==
=== Railway ===
Sumoto does not have any passenger rail service.

=== Highways ===
- Kobe-Awaji-Naruto Expressway
- National Route 28

=== Other ===
Jointly with Minami Awaji and Awaji, the city operates a low-cost electric bike rental scheme, designed to attract visitors to stay for more than one day in order to explore the island.

== Sister cities ==
- Shinhidaka, Hokkaido, Japan
- Kronstadt, Russia
- Hawaii County, Hawaii, United States
- Van Wert, Ohio, United States

== Local attractions ==
- Awajishima Happy Monkey Centre Japan. Famous Tourist Place.
- Awajishima Historical Museum
- Sumoto Castle - A castle ruin, one of the Continued Top 100 Japanese Castles.
- Wellness Park Goshiki Takataya Kahei Park
- Yura Fortress

== Notable people from Sumoto ==
- Mao Daichi, actress
- Yuji Horii, author, video game designer, writer and director
- Mao Miyaji, actress
