= Hokudan, Hyōgo =

Dissolved municipality in Hyōgo prefecture, Japan

Hokudan (北淡町, Hokudan-chō) was a town located in Tsuna District, Hyōgo Prefecture, Japan.

As of 2003, the town had an estimated population of 9,917 and a density of 194.18 persons per km^{2}. The total area was 51.07 km^{2}.

On April 1, 2005, Hokudan, along with the towns of Awaji, Higashiura and Ichinomiya and Tsuna (all from Tsuna District), was merged to create the city of Awaji and no longer exists as an independent municipality.
