= Ichinomiya, Hyōgo (Tsuna) =

Dissolved municipality in Hyōgo prefecture, Japa

Ichinomiya (一宮町, Ichinomiya-chō) was a town located in Tsuna District, Hyōgo Prefecture, Japan.

On April 1, 2005, Ichinomiya, along with the towns of Awaji, Higashiura, Hokudan and Tsuna (all from Tsuna District), was merged to create the city of Awaji and no longer exists as an independent municipality. The town has no special relationship with another Ichinomiya in Hyogo Prefecture.

Ichinomiya literally means "the first shrine" of the province. In case of this town, it is the Izanagi Shrine of the Awaji Province.
