= Higashiura, Hyōgo =

Dissolved municipality in Hyōgo prefecture, Japa

Higashiura (東浦町, Higashiura-chō) was a town located in Tsuna District, Hyōgo Prefecture, Japan. As of 2003, the town had an estimated population of 8,769 and a density of 359.09 persons per km^{2}. The total area was 24.42 km^{2}.

== Transportation ==
=== Railway ===
No railways passes through Higashiura.

=== Highway ===
- Kobe-Awaji-Naruto Expressway
- National Route 28

== History ==
On April 1, 2005, Higashiura, along with the towns of Awaji, Hokudan, Ichinomiya and Tsuna (all from Tsuna District), was merged to create the city of Awaji and no longer exists as an independent municipality.
