= Tsuna, Hyōgo =

Dissolved municipality in Hyōgo prefecture, Japa

Tsuna (津名町, Tsuna-chō) was a town located in Tsuna District, Hyōgo, Japan.

As of 2003, the town had an estimated population of 16,395 and a density of 296.90 persons per km^{2}. The total area was 55.22 km^{2}.

On April 1, 2005, Tsuna, along with the towns of Awaji, Higashiura, Hokudan and Ichinomiya (all from Tsuna District), was merged to create the city of Awaji and no longer exists as an independent municipality.

== Points of interest ==
- Kiseki No Hoshi Greenhouse
