= List of longest suspension bridge spans of main span between 500 and 1000 meters =

== Completed suspension bridges ==
This list includes only completed suspension bridges that carry automobiles or trains that are between 500 m (1,600 ft) and 1,000 m (3,300 ft) long in main span. It does not include cable-stayed bridges, footbridges, or pipeline bridges.

Image	Name	Main span metres (feet)	Year opened	Location	Country	Ref.
	Kita Bisan-Seto Bridge	990 m (3,248.0 ft)	1988	Sakaide – Shiwaku Islands (Kagawa) 34°22′42.4″N 133°49′13.2″E	Japan	
	Severn Bridge	988 m (3,241.5 ft)	1966	Bristol (South Gloucestershire) – Chepstow (Monmouthshire) 51°36′36.2″N 2°38′26.4″W	United Kingdom	
	Third Tongling Yangtze River Bridge	988 m (3,240 ft)	2025	Tongling, Anhui 30°51′02″N 117°43′27″E	China	
	Tongzihe Bridge Jinrentong	965 m (3,170 ft)	2024	Tongzi, Guizhou 28°02′17.4″N 106°32′17.9″E	China	
	Yichang Bridge	960 m (3,149.6 ft)	2001	Yichang (Hubei) 30°34′10.5″N 111°23′29.5″E	China	
	Shimotsui-Seto Bridge	940 m (3,084.0 ft)	1988	Kojima – Shiwaku Islands (Okayama) 34°25′52.4″N 133°48′23.2″E	Japan	
	Xiushan Bridge	926 m (3,038.1 ft)	2019	Daishan, Zhejiang 30°12′40″N 122°11′7.3″E	China	
	Yongren Bridge	920 m (3,020 ft)	2023	Yongren - Dayao, Yunnan 25°53′49″N 101°29′46″E	China	
	Baidicheng Yangtze River Bridge	916 m (3,005.2 ft)	2026	Fengjie (Chongqing) 34°25′52.4″N 133°48′23.2″E	China	
	Xiling Bridge	900 m (2,952.8 ft)	1996	Sandouping (Hubei) 30°49′42.5″N 111°2′48″E	China	
	Si Du River Bridge	900 m (2,952.8 ft)	2009	Yesanguan (Hubei) 30°37′16.1″N 110°23′43.1″E	China	
	Noryang Bridge	890 m (2,919.9 ft)	2018	Namhaedo (South Gyeongsang Province) 34°56′34.4″N 127°51′58.6″E	South Korea	
	Humen Pearl River Bridge	888 m (2,913.4 ft)	1997	Dongguan (Guangdong) 22°47′49.5″N 113°36′57.2″E	China	
	Cuntan Yangtze River Bridge	880 m (2,887.1 ft)	2017	Chongqing 29°37′14.2″N 106°36′21.8″E	China	
	Ōnaruto Bridge	876 m (2,874.0 ft)	1985	Naruto (Tokushima) – Awaji Island (Hyōgo) 34°14′19.5″N 134°39′1.1″E	Japan	
	Lishui River Bridge	856 m (2,808.4 ft)	2013	Zhangjiajie (Hunan) 29°05′55″N 110°14′48″E	China	
	Second Tacoma Narrows Bridge (westbound)	853 m (2,798.6 ft)	1950	Tacoma (Washington) 47°16′5.6″N 122°33′0.7″W	United States	
	Third Tacoma Narrows Bridge (eastbound)	853 m (2,798.6 ft)	2007	Tacoma (Washington) 47°16′4.4″N 122°33′2.8″W	United States	
	Askøy Bridge	850 m (2,788.7 ft)	1992	Bergen–Askøy (Vestland) 60°23′43.6″N 5°12′54.8″E	Norway	
	Yingwuzhou Bridge	850 m (2,788.7 ft) (Note: Two main spans, 850 meters long each)	2014	Wuhan (Hubei) 30°32′2.6″N 114°16′36.8″E	China	
	Paryeong Bridge	850 m (2,788.7 ft)	2016	Ucheon – Jeokgeum (South Jeolla Province) 34°37′53″N 127°30′10″E	South Korea	
	Zhixi Yangtze River Bridge	838 m (2,749.3 ft)	2016	Yichang (Hubei) 30°42′56.2″N 111°15′45.2″E	China	
	Nanxi Bridge	820 m (2,690.3 ft)	2012	Nanxi District (Sichuan) 28°47′1.3″N 104°56′44.5″E	China	
	Taihong Yangtze River Bridge	808 m (2,650.9 ft)	2020	Chongqing 29°39′47.84″N 106°53′36″E	China	
	Oujiang North Bridge	800 m (2,600 ft)	2022	Wenzhou, Zhejiang 27°58′37.5″N 120°55′48″E	China	
	Qincaobei Bridge	788 m (2,585.3 ft)	2013	Lidu (Chongqing) 29°42′51.5″N 107°16′52.7″E	China	
	Lüzhijiang Bridge	780 m (2,560 ft)	2022	Yimen - Shuangbai, Yunnan 24°42′24.8″N 101°56′54.13″E	China	
	Innoshima Bridge	770 m (2,526.2 ft)	1983	Innoshima – Mukaishima (Hiroshima) 34°21′25.7″N 133°10′49.5″E	Japan	
	Jinshajiang Hutiaoxia Bridge	766 m (2,513)	2020	Hutiaoxiazhen (Yunnan) 27°10′27″N 100°05′02″E	China	
	Youxi Yangtze River Bridge	760 m (2,490 ft)	2022	Jiangjin, Chongqing 29°13′29″N 106°09′18″E	China	
	Akinada Bridge	750 m (2,460.6 ft)	2000	Kure – Shimokamagari (Hiroshima) 34°12′22.4″N 132°40′45.8″E	Japan	
	Semey Bridge	750 m (2,460.6 ft)	2000	Semey (East Kazakhstan Province) 50°24′35″N 80°13′28″E	Kazakhstan	
	Changshou Jingkaiqu Bridge	739 m (2,420 ft)	2021	Changshou, Chongqing 29°46′33″N 107°0′46″E	China	
	Yuecheng Xijiang Bridge	738 m (2,421.3 ft)	2020	Yunfu (Guangdong) 23°05′37″N 112°12′38″E	China	
	Jindong Bridge	730 m (2,395.0 ft)	2017	Huidong County (Sichuan) 26°30′33.3″N 103°02′24.7″E	China	
	New Carquinez Bridge	728 m (2,388.5 ft)	2003	Vallejo – Crockett (California) 38°3′39.7″N 122°13′35.5″W	United States	
	Hakuchō Bridge	720 m (2,362.2 ft)	1998	Muroran (Hokkaido) 42°21′10.4″N 140°57′1.2″E	Japan	
	Huailai Bridge	720 m (2,360 ft)	2021	Huailai, Hebei 40°20′40.33″N 115°42′50″E	China	
	Guojiatuo Yangtse River Bridge	720 m (2,360 ft)	2023	Jiangbei & Banan, Chongqing 29°34′00″N 106°40′22″E	China	
	Angostura Bridge	712 m (2,336.0 ft)	1967	Ciudad Bolívar (Bolívar) 8°8′39.9″N 63°35′53.2″W	Venezuela	
	Kanmon Bridge	712 m (2,336.0 ft)	1973	Kitakyushu (Fukuoka) – Shimonoseki (Yamaguchi) 33°57′42.2″N 130°57′31.3″E	Japan	
	San Francisco–Oakland Bay Bridge (east half of west span)	704 m (2,309.7 ft)	1936	San Francisco – Yerba Buena Island (California) 37°48′12.2″N 122°22′18.9″W	United States	
	San Francisco–Oakland Bay Bridge (west half of west span)	704 m (2,309.7 ft)	1936	San Francisco – Yerba Buena Island (California) 37°47′35.4″N 122°22′59″W	United States	
	Bronx–Whitestone Bridge	701 m (2,299.9 ft)	1939	New York City (New York) 40°48′6.7″N 73°49′47.2″W	United States	
	Honghe Bridge	700 m (2,296.6 ft)	2022	Jianshui - Yuanyang, Yunnan 23°15′22″N 102°50′6″E	China	
	Maputo–Katembe bridge	680 m (2,231.0 ft)	2018	Maputo 25°58′23″S 32°33′25″E	Mozambique	
	Feilonghu Wujiang Bridge	680 m (2,231.0 ft)	2021	Yuqing - Meitan, Guizhou 27°23′47″N 107°27′10″E	China	
	Hesandu Wujiang Bridge	680 m (2,231.0 ft)	2021	Fenggang- Shiqian, Guizhou 27°23′47″N 107°27′10″E	China	
	Stord Bridge	677 m (2,221.1 ft)	2001	Stord (Vestland) 59°44′53″N 5°24′10″E	Norway	
	Pierre Laporte Bridge	668 m (2,191.6 ft)	1970	Quebec 46°44′42.8″N 71°17′25.7″W	Canada	
	Sunxi Bridge	660 m (2,165.4 ft)	2018	Jiangjin, Chongqing 46°44′42.8″N 71°17′25.7″W	China	
	Lixiang Railway Jinsha River Bridge	660 m (2,165.4 ft)	2023	Yulong - Shangri-La, Yunnan 27°10′27″N 100°5′2″E	China	
	Baihetan Jinsha River Bridge	656 m (2,152.2 ft)	2016	Qiaojia - Ningnan, Sichuan 26°58′13.07″N 102°53′30.72″E	China	
	Delaware Memorial Bridge (eastbound)	655 m (2,149.0 ft)	1951	New Castle County, Delaware - Pennsville Township, New Jersey 39°41′18.2″N 75°31′6.2″W	United States	
	Delaware Memorial Bridge (westbound)	655 m (2,149.0 ft)	1968	New Castle County, Delaware - Pennsville Township, New Jersey 39°41′20.3″N 75°31′5″W	United States	
	Second Cheonsa Bridge	650 m (2,132.5 ft)	2019	Jeollanam-do 34°51′38″N 126°12′20″E	South Korea	
	Yangbaoshan Bridge	650 m (2,132.5 ft)	2022	Guiding,Guizhou 26°43′35″N 107°14′15″E	China	
	Jinfeng Wujiang Bridge	650 m (2,132.5 ft)	2023	Xifeng - Jinsha, Guizhou 27°11′51″N 106°28′16″E	China	
	Haicang Bridge	648 m (2,126.0 ft)	1999	Xiamen, Fujian 24°29′41″N 118°4′24″E	China	
	Tengzhou Xunjiang Bridge	638 m (2,090 ft)	2025	Tengxian, Guangxi	China	
	Beipan River Hukun Expressway Bridge	636 m (2,086.6 ft)	2009	Qinglong - Guanling, Guizhou 25°53′55″N 105°19′23″E	China	
	Taoyuan Jinsha River Bridge	636 m (2,086.6 ft)	2020	Yongsheng, Yunnan 26°11′11″N 100°35′55″E	China	
	Puli Bridge	628 m (2,060.4 ft)	2015	Xuanwei, Yunnan 26°19′16″N 104°35′11″E	China	
	Gjemnessund Bridge	623 m (2,044.0 ft)	1992	Gjemnes (Møre og Romsdal) 62°58′17″N 7°46′47″E	Norway	
	Yuzui Liangjiang Bridge	616 m (2,021.0 ft)	2010	Liangjiang, Chongqing 29°36′30″N 106°46′36″E	China	
	Walt Whitman Bridge	610 m (2,001.3 ft)	1957	Philadelphia, Pennsylvania - Gloucester City, New Jersey 39°54′18.7″N 75°7′46.1″W	United States	
	Tancarville Bridge	608 m (1,994.8 ft)	1959	Tancarville - Marais-Vernier 49°28′21.6″N 0°27′52.8″E	France	
	New Little Belt Bridge	600 m (1,968.5 ft)	1970	Jutland - Funen 55°31′7.1″N 9°44′56.9″E	Denmark	
	Kurushima Kaikyo 1st Bridge	600 m (1,968.5 ft)	1999	Imabari, Ehime 34°7′32.9″N 133°0′45.1″E	Japan	
	Egongyan Yangtze River Bridge	600 m (1,968.5 ft)	2000	Chongqing 29°31′14″N 106°31′56″E	China	
	Jijiang Yangtze River Bridge	600 m (1,968.5 ft)	2016	Jiangjin, Chongqing 29°17′40″N 106°15′40″E	China	
	Egongyan Yangtze River Metro Bridge	600 m (1,968.5 ft)	2018	Chongqing 29°31′20″N 106°31′42″E	China	
	Osterøy Bridge	595 m (1,952.1 ft)	1997	Osterøy–Bergen (Vestland) 60°25′33.4″N 5°32′9.5″E	Norway	
	Baisha Yangtze River Bridge	590 m (1,935.7 ft)	2021	Jiangjin, Chongqing 29°5′24″N 106°8′20″E	China	
	Wanzhou Second Yangtze River Bridge	580 m (1,902.9 ft)	2004	Wanzhou, Chongqing 30°49′26″N 108°24′33″E	China	
	Guanshan Bridge	580 m (1,902.9 ft)	2015	Daishan, Zhejiang 30°13′19″N 122°12′28″E	China	
	Luzhou Second Yangtze River Bridge	576 m (1,889.8 ft)	2023	Luzhou, Sichuan	China	
	Bømla Bridge	577 m (1,893.0 ft)	2001	Stord–Bømlo (Vestland) 59°44′13.5″N 5°22′37.2″E	Norway	
	Rainbow Bridge	570 m (1,870.1 ft)	1993	Minato, Tokyo 35°38′11″N 139°45′49″E	Japan	
	Ambassador Bridge	564 m (1,850.4 ft)	1929	Detroit–Windsor 42°18′43.2″N 83°4′27.2″W	United States Canada	
	Hakata–Ōshima Bridge	560 m (1,837.3 ft)	1988	Hakatajima - Ōshima 34°11′37″N 133°04′27″E	Japan	
	Zhongxian Yangtze River Bridge	560 m (1,837.3 ft)	2001	Zhongxian, Chongqing 30°17′58″N 108°3′13″E	China	
	Guihua Bridge	560 m (1,837.3 ft)	2022	Wushan, Chongqing 31°7′35″N 109°53′44″E	China	
	Fenglin Bridge	550 m (1,804.5 ft)	2021	Xingyi, Guizhou 25°04′30″N 104°59′51″E	China	
	Heishuihe Bridge	550 m (1,804.5 ft)	2024	Luzhou, Sichuan 27°01′44″N 102°43′53″E	China	
	Throgs Neck Bridge	550 m (1,804.5 ft)	1961	New York City 40°48′0.9″N 73°47′36″W	United States	
	Toyoshima Ohashi Bridge	540 m (1,771.7 ft)	2008	Kure, Hiroshima 34°10′35″N 132°46′06″E	Japan	
	Dimuhe Bridge	538 m (1,765.1 ft)	2015	Shuicheng, Guizhou 26°39′7″N 105°4′24″E	China	
	Liujiaxia Yellow River Bridge	536 m (1,758.5 ft)	2013	Linxia, Gansu 35°50′42″N 103°16′4″E	China	
	Benjamin Franklin Bridge	533 m (1,748.7 ft)	1926	Philadelphia, Pennsylvania - Camden, New Jersey 39°57′10.5″N 75°8′3.3″W	United States	
	Skjomen Bridge	525 m (1,722.4 ft)	1972	Narvik (Nordland) 68°22′15″N 17°14′27″E	Norway	
	Kvalsund Bridge	525 m (1,722.4 ft)	1977	Hammerfest (Finnmark) 28°45′56″N 105°20′10″E	Norway	
	Dalsfjord Bridge	523 m (1,715.9 ft)	2013	Fjaler–Askvoll (Vestland) 61°22′25″N 5°23′47″E	Norway	
	Matadi Bridge	520 m (1,706.0 ft)	1983	Matadi 5°49′31.4″S 13°26′3.1″E	Democratic Republic of the Congo	
	Yellow River Sanxia Bridge	510 m (1,670 ft)	2025	Jiyuan - Xin'an, Henan 35°1′37″N 112°6′27″E	China	
	Emmerich Rhine Bridge	500 m (1,640.4 ft)	1965	Emmerich am Rhein 51°49′44.8″N 6°13′35″E	Germany	
	Gwangan Bridge	500 m (1,640.4 ft)	2003	Busan 35°8′44.8″N 129°7′41.8″E	South Korea	
	Dazi Bridge	500 m (1,640.4 ft)	1984	Dazi, Xizang 29°40′32″N 91°22′39″E	China	

== Bridges under construction ==
Name	Main span metres (feet)	Year to open	Location	Country	Ref.
Shazhenxi Yangtse River Bridge	968 m (3,180 ft)		Zigui, Hubei	China	
Xiamen-Jinmen Bridge Liuwudian Channel Bridge	928 m (3,040 ft)		Xiamen, Fujian	China	
Baidicheng Yangtse River Bridge	916 m (3,010 ft)	2026	Fengjie, Chongqing	China	
Tianmen Bridge	820 m (2,690 ft)	2026	Liupanshui, Guizhou	China	
Dongtingxi Yuanshui Bridge	800 m (2,620 ft)	2026	Yuanling, Hunan	China	
Huangjuetuo Yangtse River Bridge	765 m (2,510 ft)	2027	Jiangbei-Nan'an, Chongqing	China	
Tianshui Xiakou Weihe Bridge	736 m (2,410 ft)	2026	Tianshui, Gansu	China	
Daxihe Bridge	720 m (2,360 ft)	2026	Chongqing	China	
Rushankou Bridge	666 m (2,190 ft)	2026	Rushan, Shandong	China	
G318 National Highway Yalong River Bridge	650 m (2,130 ft)	2026	Yajiang - Litang, Sichuan	China	
Litanghe Bridge	630 m (2,070 ft)	2028	Muli, Sichuan	China	
Jijiang Yangtze River Metro Bridge	610 m (2,001.3 ft)	2027	Jiangjin, Chongqing	China	
Nansha Wanlong Bridge	608 m (1,990 ft)	2026	Guangzhou, Guangdong	China	
New Sotra Bridge	608 m (1,990 ft)	2027	Bergen–Øygarden (Vestland)	Norway	
Xunjiang Bridge	520 m (1,710 ft)	2026	Tengxian, Guangxi	China	

== See also ==
- List of longest suspension bridge spans
