= Awaji =

Awaji may refer to:

- Awaji Island, an island in Hyōgo Prefecture
  - Awaji Province
  - Awaji, Hyōgo
- Awaji Station, a station in Osaka Prefecture
- Awajichō, Tokyo, a district of Tokyo
- 3380 Awaji, a main-belt Asteroid
- Awaji ware
- Japanese ships named Awaji

== People with the surname ==
- Keiko Awaji (淡路 恵子, 1933–2014), Japanese actress
- Shuzo Awaji (淡路 修三, born 1949), Japanese Go player
- Suguru Awaji (淡路 卓, born 1989), Japanese Olympic fencer
