= Awaji Kokubun-ji =

Awaji Kokubun-ji 淡路国分寺
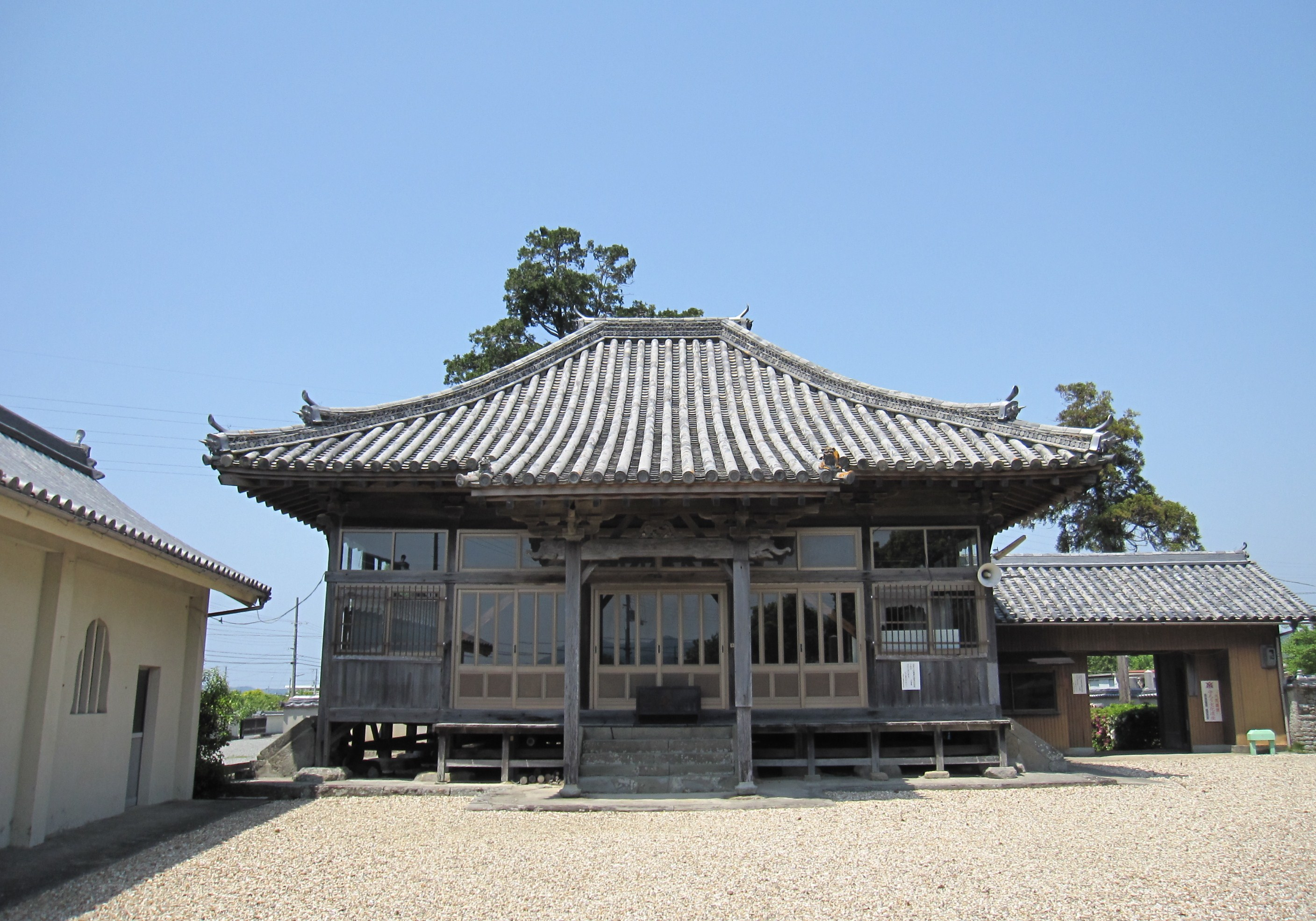
- Awaji Kokubun-ji former Hondō

- Awaji Kokubun-ji Awaji Kokubun-ji (Japan)

Religion
- Affiliation: Buddhist
- Deity: Shaka Nyōrai
- Rite: Ritsu

Location
- Location: 331 Yagikokubu, Minamiawaji, Hyōgo-ken 656-0434
- Country: Japan
- Interactive map of Awaji Kokubun-ji 淡路国分寺
- Coordinates: 34°17′54.73″N 134°46′57.55″E

Architecture
- Founder: Emperor Shōmu
- Completed: c.775

Website
- Official website
- National Historic Site of Japan Important Cultural Property

Awaji Kokubun-ji (淡路国分寺) is a Buddhist temple in the Yagikokubu neighborhood of the city of Minamiawaji, Hyōgo, Japan. It belongs to the Ritsu-sect and its honzon is a statue of Shaka Nyōrai. It the successor of the provincial temple of Awaji Province established by Emperor Shōmu during the Nara period (710–794). Due to this connection, the foundation stones of the Nara period pagoda were designated as a National Historic Site in 1951.

== History ==
The Shoku Nihongi records that in 741, as the country recovered from a major smallpox epidemic, Emperor Shōmu ordered that a monastery and nunnery be established in every province, the kokubunji (国分寺). These temples were built to a semi-standardized template, and served both to spread Buddhist orthodoxy to the provinces, and to emphasize the power of the Nara period centralized government under the Ritsuryō system.

The Awaji Kokubun-ji is located on a river terrace on the right bank of the middle reaches of the Mihara River in the southern part of Awaji Island. The ruins of the provincialcapital are to the west, and the Yamato Ōkunitama Shrine, the ninomiya of Awaji province is located nearby.

The exact date of the temple's foundation is unknown; but from the style of the roof tiles found on the site it is believed to have been towards the end of the Nara period. per the second volume of "Nihon Ryōiki", the temple was not listed in a list of 26 kokubun-ji in various provinces and a complaint was registered to expedite the completion of the temple in 756 AD. It appears to have been completed before 775 AD, and it is mentioned on occasion in Heian period records, including the Engishiki of 927 AD. During the early Kamakura period, per the Azuma Kagami, the temple's address is listed as undeveloped land belonging to the Ise Grand Shrine, indicating that the temple had declined and had largely become a shōen landed estate. Although the temple's current main image, a statue of the Shaka Nyōrai is dated 1340, the temple appears to have all but vanished during the Muromachi period. It was revived during the Sengoku period around 1525, but was destroyed again by a marauding army in the Tenshō era (1573–1592). It was revived again in 1666 as a subsidiary of Toshodai-ji in Nara.

The temple area was approximately 170 meters east-to-west by 210 meters north-to-south, and was surrounded by a walls and a moat with a width of two meters. The foundations of the Main Hall and Pagoda have been found, but the layout of the temple is not clear. The Main Hall foundation platform measures 13–14 meters on a side and overlaps with the current Dainichi-do. Five foundation stones of the Pagoda remain: the four cornerstones and a central stone with a diameter of 1.36 meters with a recess for holding the main spar of the building. However, none of these stone are in their original position. In 1951, the foundations of the pagoda were designated a National Historic Site. Archaeological excavations were conducted in 1967, 1981, 1984–1988 and from 2002 to 2003. This final excavation uncovered the ruins of two kilns used to make the roof tiles used by the temple.

== Cultural properties ==
=== National important cultural properties ===
- '"Wooden Shaka Nyorai seated statue"' (木造釈迦如来坐像), Nanboku-chō period, dated 1340. It has a height of 294.8-cm. It was designated as a national Important Cultural Property in 1901.

=== Hyogo prefectural tangible cultural properties ===
- '"Hiten seated statue"' (飛天坐像), Heian period, height 53.7 cm. A hiten is a Buddhist angel, usually displayed on a halo or on a wall or a Buddhist statue. This image is squatting with its right knee raised and its left knee lowered, and although both arms are missing, it is assumed that the statue depicts a musical instrument or a dance. There are also traces of burn damage (indicating that the building burned down after the late Heian period).

== Gallery ==
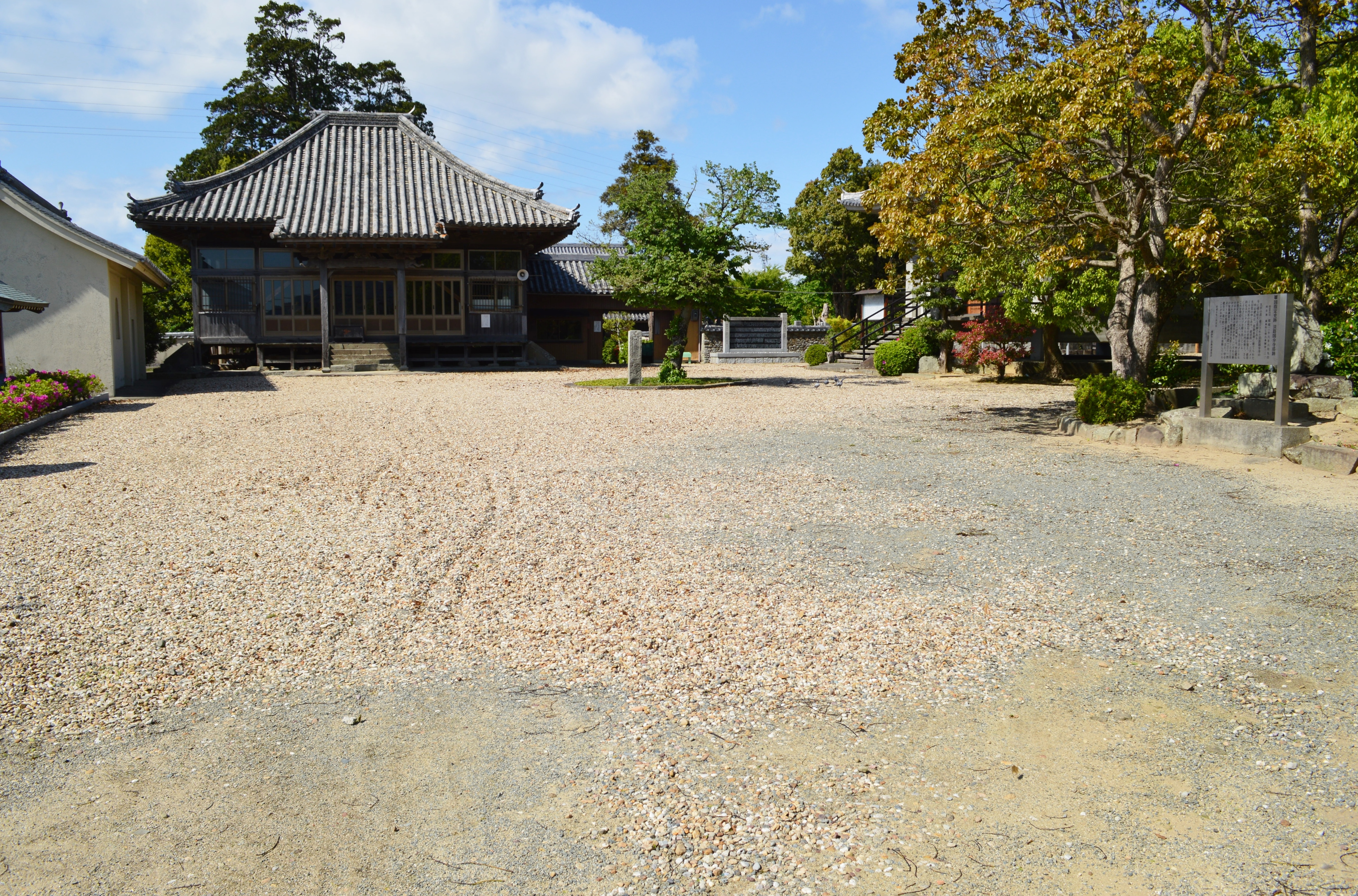
Precincts

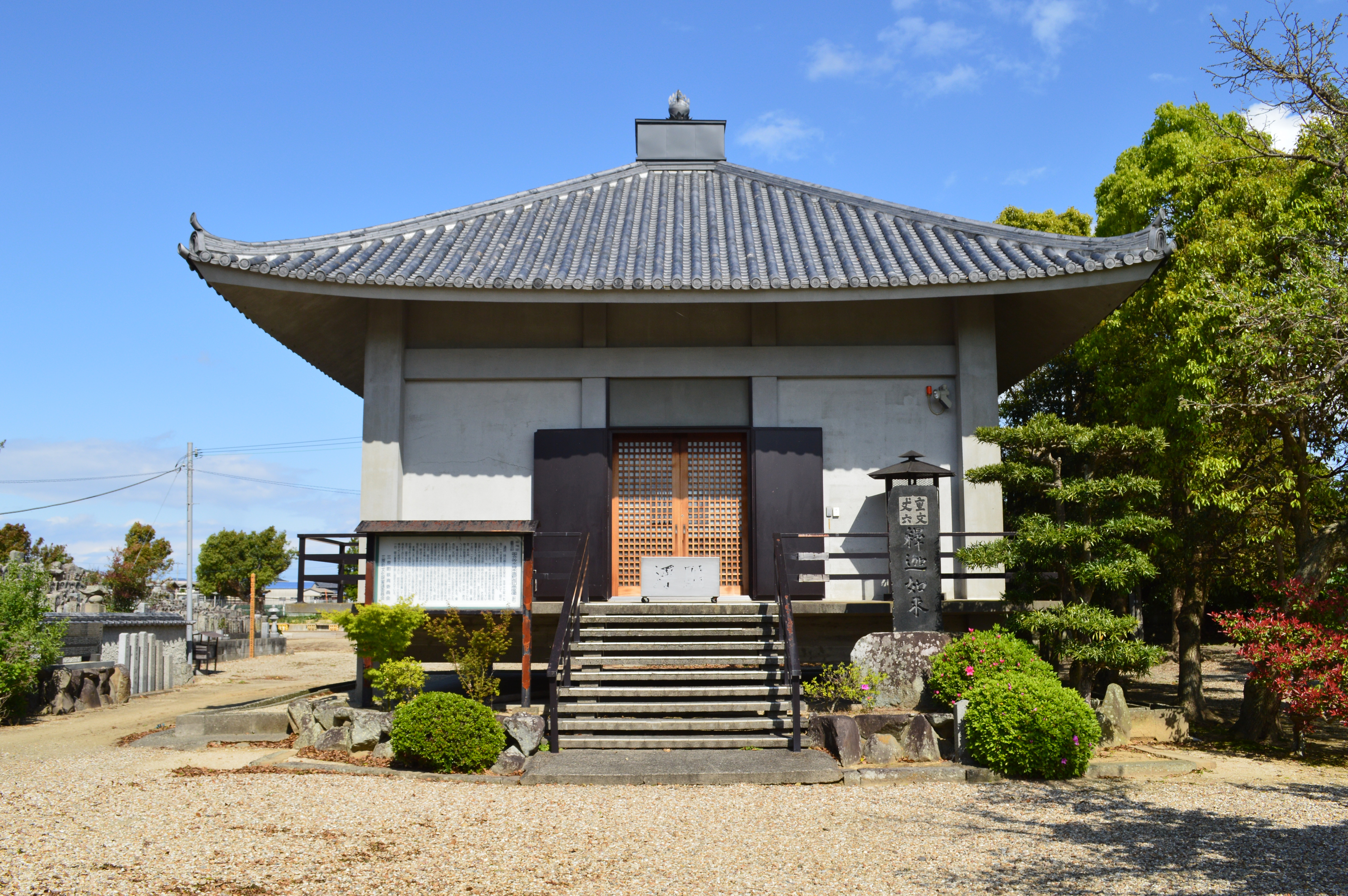
Current Hondo

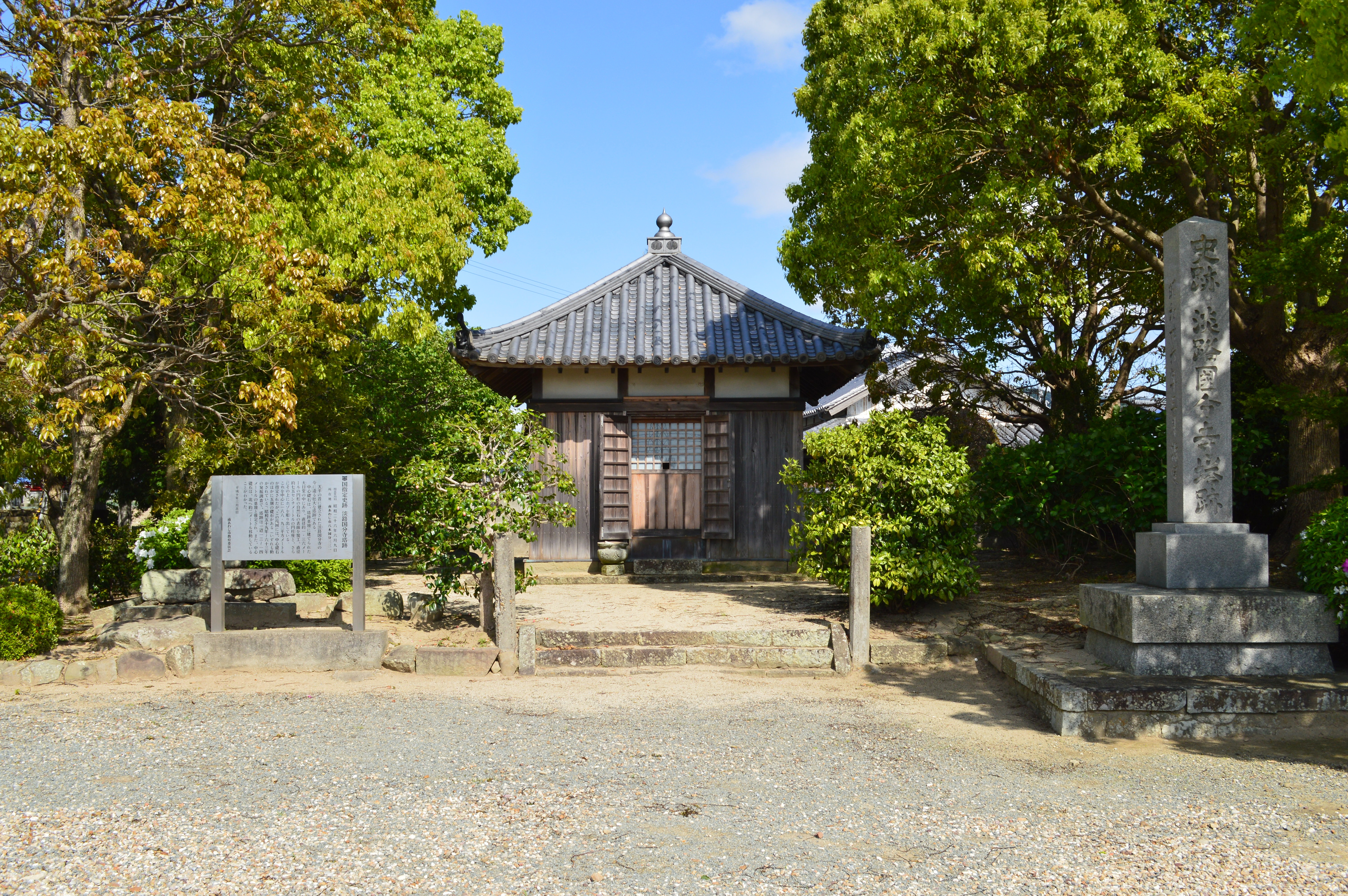
Dainishi-do
site of the ancient pagoda

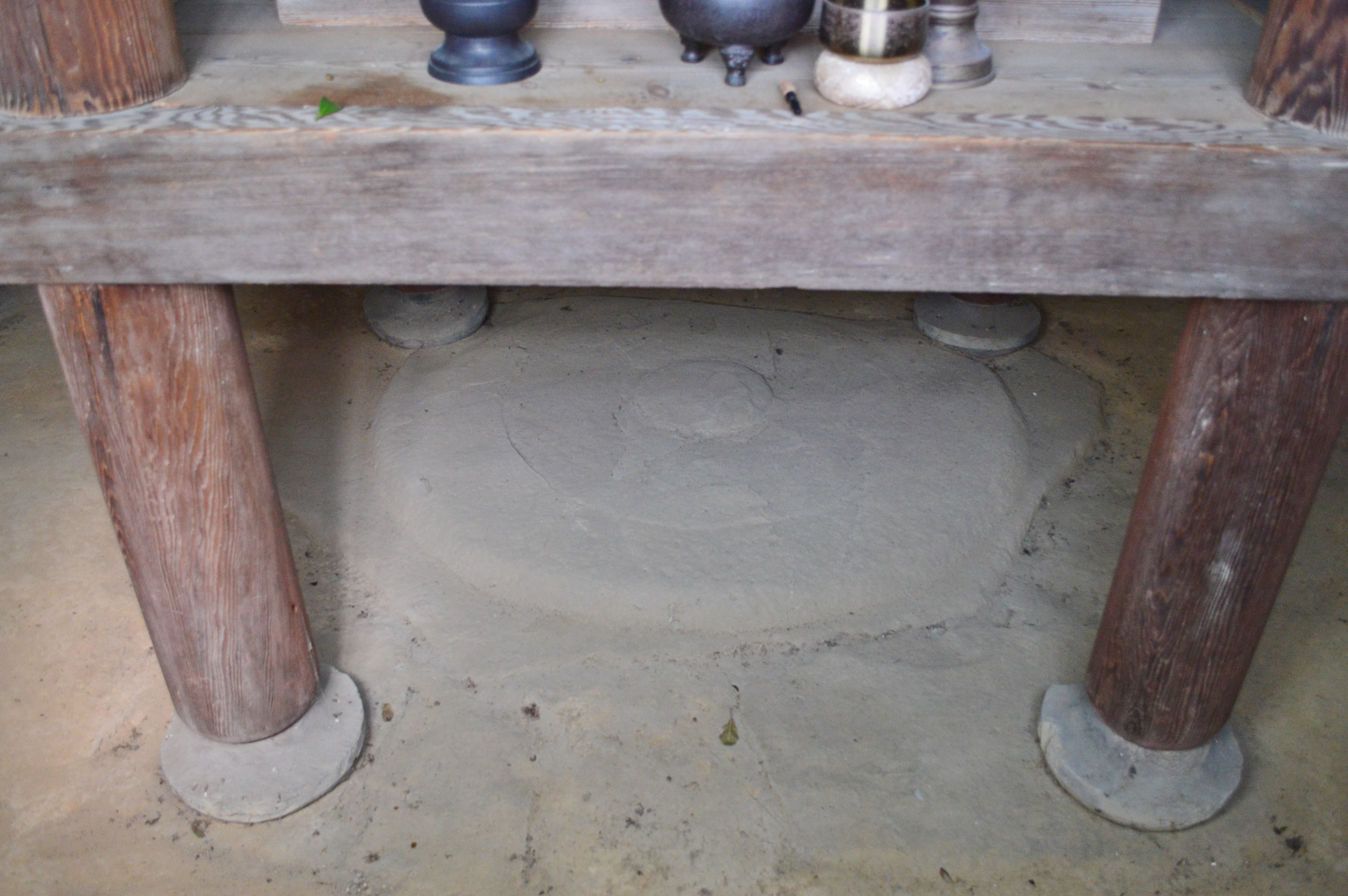
Foundation stone of the Pagoda

== See also ==
- List of Historic Sites of Japan (Hyōgo)
- provincial temple
