= Emiko Kaminuma =

Japanese comedian, singer and TV personality

- 上沼 恵美子
- Born: Emiko Hashimoto (橋本恵美子); 13 April 1955 (age 71); Fukura (now Minamiawaji), Mihara District, Hyōgo, Japan
- Other names: Senri Unabara 海原千里 (former stage name, 1971-77)
- Years active: 1971–77; 1978–
- Agent: Kaminuma Jimusho
- Television: Kaiketsu Emi-channeru
- Spouse: Shinpei Kaminuma (m. 1977)
- Relatives: Sister: Momoko Ashikawa (née Hashimoto), also known as Mari Unabara (former stage name)

YouTube information
- Channel: @Emiko.Kaminuma
- Years active: 2021–present
- Subscribers: 477 thousand
- Views: 54.4 million
- Last updated: April 25, 2024

Emiko Kaminuma (上沼 恵美子, Kaminuma Emiko; born 13 April 1955, in Fukura (now Minamiawaji), Mihara District, Hyōgo) is a Japanese comedian, singer, television presenter, YouTuber, and radio personality. Her maiden name is Hashimoto (橋本). Kaminuma is one of the leading broadcast personalities in the Kansai region. She has often appeared in Kansai local programs, and has garnered high ratings since the late 1990s.

She is married with two children. Kaminuma's husband is Shinpei Kaminuma, a Kansai Telecasting Corporation (KTV) television director, producer, executive director, and production director, as well as Media Pulpo (KTV's subsidiary) representative director and chairman. Kaminuma is represented by her agency, Kaminuma Jimusho. She dropped out of Empire Girls High School Owada School (now Osaka International Waseda High School).

== Early Career as Senri Unabara ==
Kaminuma, then Emiko Hashimoto, debuted with her sister Momoko in 1971 as the manzai duo Unabara Senri・Mari. As disciples of the popular manzai duo Unabara Ohama Kohama, Emiko was named Senri Unabara and the boke of the duo, while her sister Momoko was given the name Mari Unabara and had the role of tsukkomi. The duo made many appearances on television, with regular appearances on Star Manzai Championship (スター漫才選手権, MBS).

The duo also had a successful music career. In 1973, they released their debut single Osananajimi de Onaidoshi (幼なじみでおないどし) under Teichiku Records, written by the poet Yoko Shimada. However, after a move to Victor in 1976, the duo released the single Osaka Rhapsody (大阪ラプソディー), ranking #24 on the Oricon Singles Chart.

In May 1977, Senri/Emiko announced she was marrying Shinpei Kaminuma and retiring from show business, effectively ending the duo with her sister.

However, in 1978, after the birth of her first son, she re-entered show business under her married name: Emiko Kaminuma.

== Current appearances ==
From the end of September 2013 Kaminuma made regular appearances in her own television programs.

Title	Network
Kaminuma-Takada no Kugizuke!	YTV, CTV
Emiko Kaminuma no kokoro Seiten	ABC Radio

== Former appearances ==
Year	Title	Network	Notes
	Shabon-dama Present	ABC	Chisato Kaibara era
	Hana no Shinkon! Computer Sakusen	KTV	
	Ayu no uta	NHK Osaka	Chisato Kaibara era
	Non-Stop Game	KTV	
	Shingo no Wagamama Ōhyakka	MBS, TBS	
	Hotline 110-ban	TV Asahi	
	P.S. Aishi teru!	CTV	
	Kōhaku Uta Gassen	NHK	Red team presenter (45th and 46th)
	Itsu demo Emi o!	KTV, Fuji TV	
	Takajin Mune-ippai	KTV	
	Emiko Kaminuma wa Mita! Nichijō Wide Gekijō	TBS	
	Shokutaku no Dai Bōken	ABC	
	Oba-chan 1000 Man-en!!	TBS	
	Star Manzai Senshuken	MBS	Chisato Kaibara era
	M-1 Grand Prix	ABC, TV Asahi	Jurist; Asked by Shinsuke Shimada and did not refuse
	Konya wa Emyi Go!!	MBS, CBC	
	Chiritotechin	NHK Osaka	Narration
	Waga Kokoro no Osaka Melody	NHK Osaka	(Note: Kaminuma appeared as both a singer and presenter until she was knocked out in 2013, she later appeared in 2015 as a full-time singer.)
	Emiko Kaminuma no oshaberi Cooking	ABC	
	Kaiketsu Emi-channeru Hoka	KTV	

=== Radio ===
Title	Network
Kayōkyoku buttsuke Honban	ABC Radio
Emiko Kaminuma no Nippon Hōsō Hatsu Jōriku! 2005-Nen Iitaihōdai	NBS

=== Advertisements ===
Year	Title
1986	Lion Corporation Pikokan
1988	Morishige Doll
1989	Butsudan Butsugu no Senoku
1990	Asahi Shimbun
1997	Japan Advertising Review Organization
1998	Kobayashi Pharmaceutical

== Films ==
Year	Title	Role
1976	Track Yarō-Bōkyō Ichibanhoshi	Drive-in landlady

== Discography ==
Year	Title
1995	"Osaka hitori"
1998	"Haru Natsu Aki Fuyu"
2002	"Egao o Sakasemashou"
2004	"Cosmos Yurete"
2005	"Awamori Shinjū / Osaka Rhapsody"
2015	"Akantare"

== Bibliography ==
Year	Title	Notes
2011	Inumokuwanai: Kaminuma-san Chino Fūfu-genka Jiken-bo	Co-written with Shinpei Kaminuma
