= Kobe-Awaji-Naruto Expressway =

Honshu-Shikoku highway project

Kobe-Awaji-Naruto Expressway
- 神戸淡路鳴門自動車道

Route information
- Maintained by Honshu-Shikoku Bridge Expressway Company
- Length: 89.0 km (55.3 mi)
- Existed: 1985–present
- Component highways: National Route 28

Major junctions
- North end: Kobe-nishi Interchange; AH1 San'yō Expressway in Nishi-ku, Kobe, Hyōgo
- South end: Sakaide Interchange; Takamatsu Expressway in Naruto, Tokushima

Location
- Country: Japan

Highway system
- National highways of Japan; Expressways of Japan

The Kobe-Awaji-Naruto Expressway (神戸淡路鳴門自動車道, Kōbe-Awaji-Naruto Jidōsha-dō; shortened to Shintanmei-dō (神淡鳴道)) is a tolled expressway that connects Hyōgo and Tokushima prefectures in Japan by crossings of the Akashi Strait and Naruto Strait. Built between 1970 and 1998, it is one of the three routes of the Honshu-Shikoku Bridge Expressway Company connecting Honshū and Shikoku islands. The route is signed E28 under Ministry of Land, Infrastructure, Transport and Tourism's "2016 Proposal for Realization of Expressway Numbering."

== Route description ==
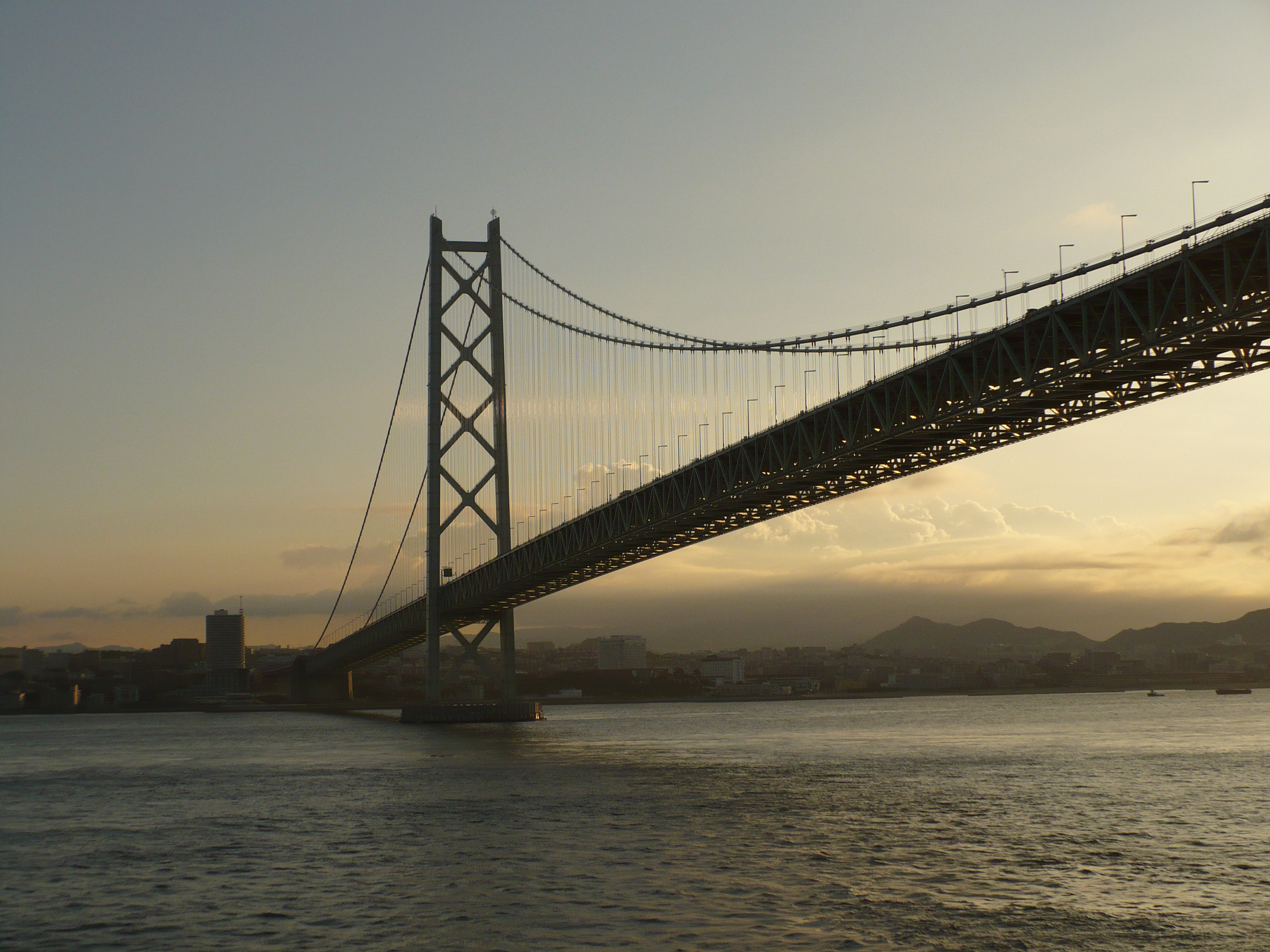
The Akashi Kaikyō Bridge has the world's second-longest central span (at 1,991 metres) among suspension bridges. It is a vital part of the Kobe-Awaji-Naruto Expressway

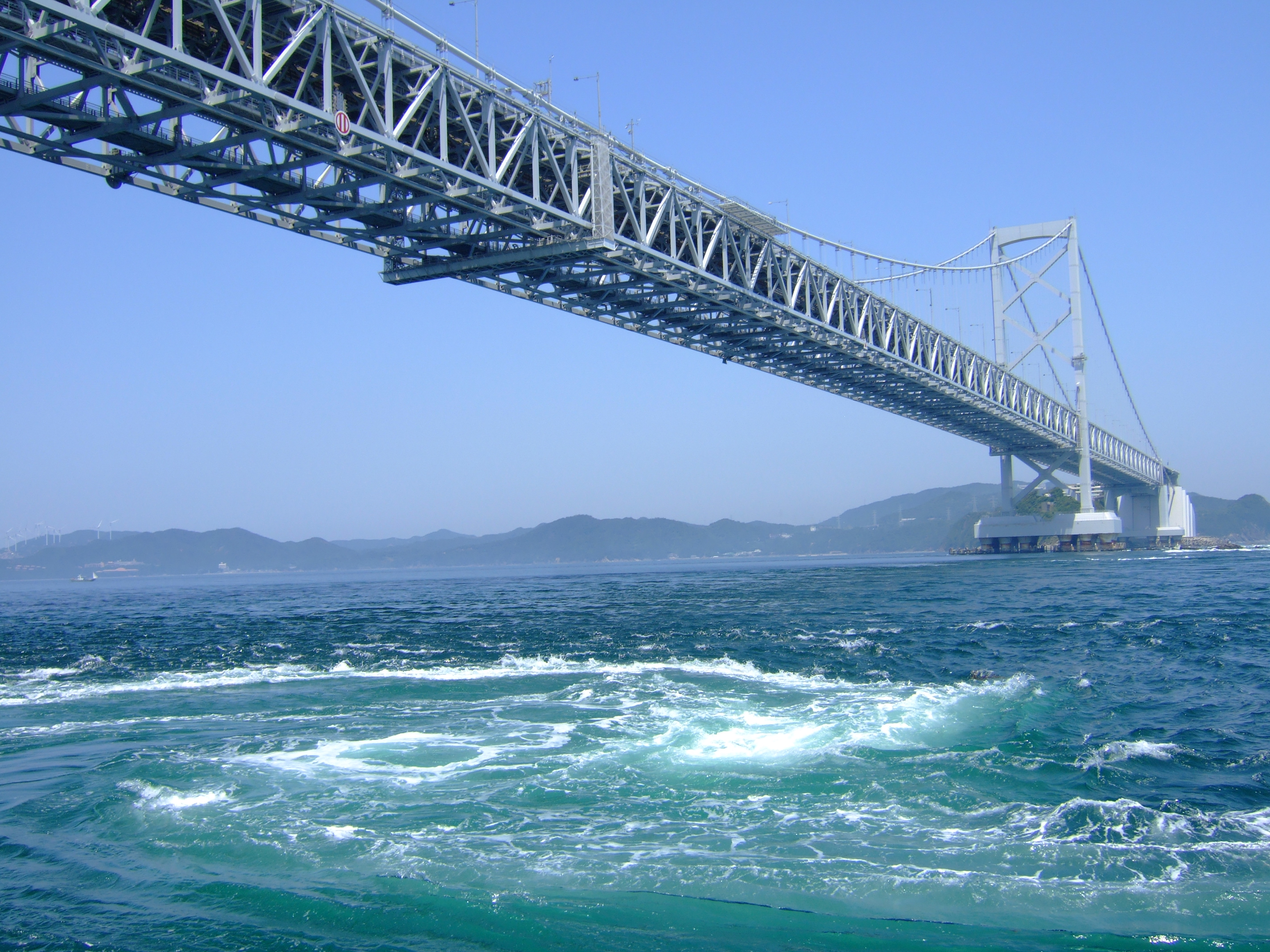
The Ōnaruto Bridge connects Minamiawaji, Hyogo on Awaji Island with Naruto, Tokushima on Ōge Island

The expressway is 89.0 kilometres (55.3 mi) long with 24.3 kilometres (15.1 mi) of that stretch consisting of bridges, chiefly the Akashi Kaikyō Bridge and Ōnaruto Bridge. The expressway has four lanes along the entire route from Kobe to Naruto in Tokushima, with an exception along the Akashi Kaikyō Bridge, where it has six lanes. The speed limit is 70 km/h between Awajishima-minami Interchange and Naruto-kita Interchange, 100 km/h between Awaji Interchange and Seidan-Mihara Interchange as well as between Kobe-Nishi Interchange and Tarumi Junction. The remainder of the expressway has a speed limit set at 80 km/h.

== History ==
On 8 June 1985 the first sections of the expressway opened. These were between Tsuna-Ichinomiya Interchange and Sumoto Interchange and between Naruto-kita Interchange and the now defunct Seidan Interchange. The latter of the two sections includes the Ōnaruto Bridge. On 23 May 1987, the road was extended south from Naruto-kita Interchange to its southern terminus at Naruto Interchange. Next, on 8 October 1987, the highway between Sumoto IC and Seidan-Mihara Interchange was opened. The opening of Seidan-Mihara Interchange necessitated the closure of Seidan Interchange. On 5 April 1998 the highway between Kobe-Nishi Interchange and Tsuna-Ichinomiya Interchange was opened with the completion of the Akashi Kaikyō Bridge. The most recent development on the expressway came on 17 February 2018, when the ETC-only Awajishima-chuo Smart Interchange was opened.

== Junction list ==
TB= Toll booth, SA= Service Area, PA= Parking Area

Prefecture	Location	km	mi	Exit	Name	Destinations	Notes
Through to AH1 San'yō Expressway
Hyōgo	Nishi-ku, Kobe	0	0.0	1/TB	Kobe-nishi	AH1 San'yō Expressway, Hyōgo Prefecture Route 22– Osaka, Okayama	
Hyōgo	Nishi-ku, Kobe	5.0	3.1	2	Fusehata	Hanshin Expressway Kita-Kobe Route	
Hyōgo	Tarumi-ku, Kobe	8.8	5.5	3	Tarumi	Kitasen Road; Hanshin Expressway Bayshore Route– Himeji, Osaka, Kobe Airport	
Hyōgo	Tarumi-ku, Kobe	8.8	5.5	3	Tarumi	Hyōgo Prefecture Route 488	
Hyōgo	Akashi Kaikyō Bridge over the Akashi Strait						
Hyōgo	Awaji	20.1	12.5	4/SA	Awaji	National Route 28, Hyōgo Prefecture Route 31, Hyōgo Prefecture Route 157– Sumoto, Hokudan, Nii	Gas station available at the service area
Hyōgo	Awaji	25.5	15.8	5	Higashiura	Hyōgo Prefecture Route 460– National Route 28	
Hyōgo	Awaji	34.3	21.3	6	Hokudan	Hyōgo Prefecture Route 123	
Hyōgo	Awaji	35.5	22.1	PA	Murozu		
Hyōgo	Awaji	44.4	27.6	7	Tsuna-Ichinomiya	Hyōgo Prefecture Route 66– National Route 28, Goshiki, Central Awaji	
Hyōgo	Sumoto	52.4	32.6	7-1	Awajishima-chūō	Hyōgo Prefecture Route 46– Central Sumoto, Goshiki	Smart Interchange; only vehicles equipped with ETC may use the exit
Hyōgo	Sumoto	56.3	35.0	8	Sumoto	National Route 28, Hyōgo Prefecture Route 472– Central Sumoto, Minamiawaji	
Hyōgo	Minamiawaji	59.4	36.9	PA	Midori		
Hyōgo	Minamiawaji	65.8	40.9	9	Seidan-Mihara	Hyōgo Prefecture Route 31, Hyōgo Prefecture Route 126– Seidan, Goshiki, Mihara, Nandan	
Hyōgo	Minamiawaji	74.6	46.4	10/PA	Awajishima-minami	Hyōgo Prefecture Route 25	
Ōnaruto Bridge over the Naruto Strait
Tokushima	Naruto	81.7	50.8		Naruto-kita	Tokushima Prefecture Route 11– Central Naruto	
Tokushima	Naruto	Muya Bridge over the Konaruto Strait					
Tokushima	Naruto	89.0	55.3	12/TB	Naruto	Takamatsu Expressway; National Route 11– Central Naruto, Takamatsu, Tokushima	
Through to Takamatsu Expressway / Tokushima Expressway
1.000 mi = 1.609 km; 1.000 km = 0.621 mi: Electronic toll collection

== See also ==
- Japan National Route 28
