= E28 =

E28 may refer to:

- BMW 5 Series (E28)
- European route E28
- Sultan Abdul Halim Muadzam Shah Bridge, Malaysian expressway Route E28
- Kobe-Awaji-Naruto Expressway, route E28 in Japan
- Tochomae Station on the Toei Oedo line in Tokyo
