= Ōnaruto Bridge =

Overpass between Awaji and Oge Islands, Japan

Ōnaruto Bridge (大鳴門橋, Ōnaruto-kyō)
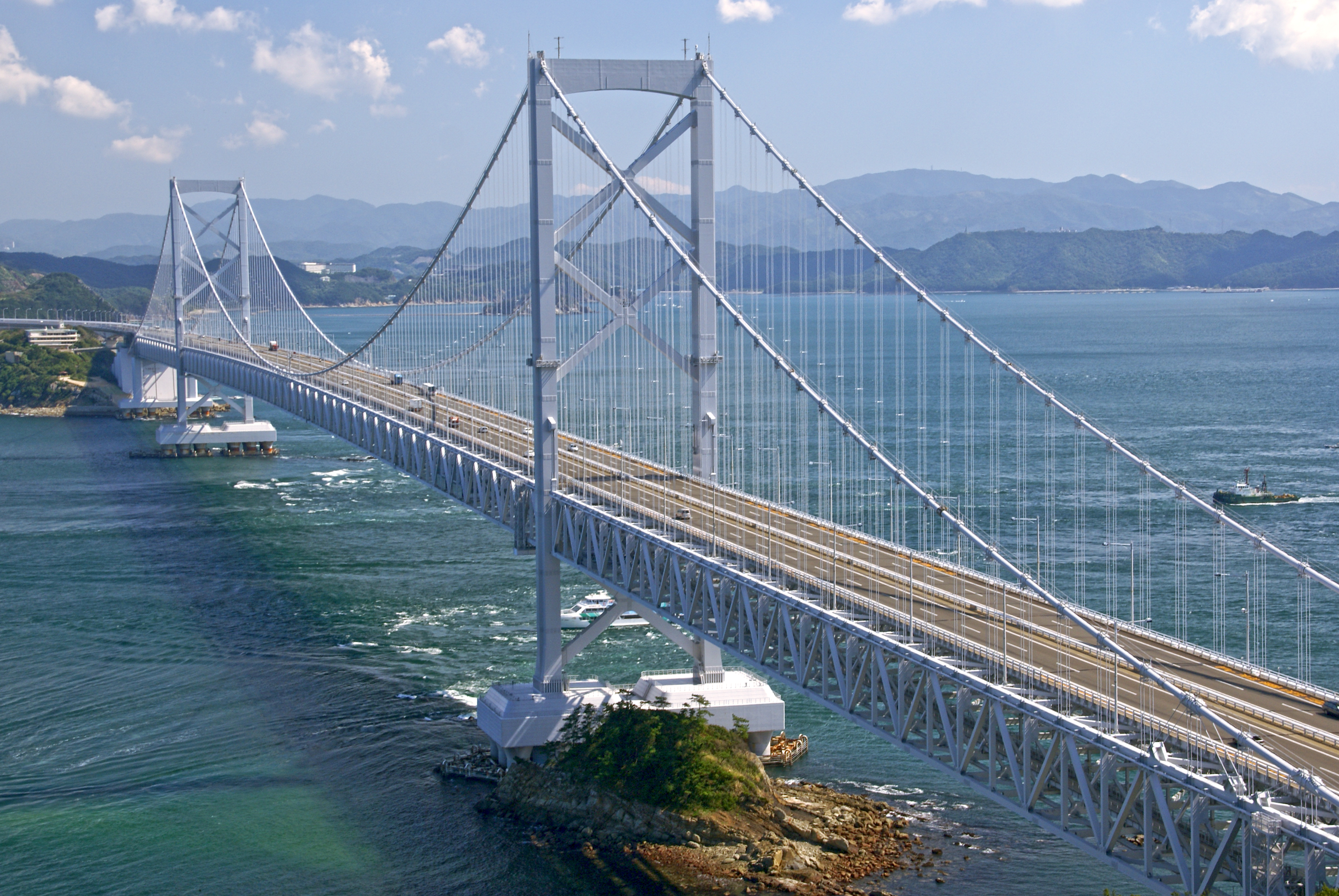
- from Mt. Naruto
- Coordinates: 34°14′19″N 134°39′05″E
- Carries: 4 lanes of the Kobe-Awaji-Naruto Expressway
- Crosses: Naruto Strait
- Locale: Naruto, Tokushima and Minamiawaji, Hyogo
- Maintained by: Honshū-Shikoku Bridge Authority

Characteristics
- Design: Suspension bridge
- Longest span: 876 metres (2,874 ft)
- Clearance below: 41 metres (135 ft)

History
- Opened: 1985

Statistics
- Daily traffic: 18,600

Location
- Interactive map of Ōnaruto Bridge (大鳴門橋, Ōnaruto-kyō)

The Ōnaruto Bridge (大鳴門橋, Ōnaruto-kyō; lit. "Great Naruto Bridge") is a suspension bridge that carries 4 lanes of the Kobe-Awaji-Naruto Expressway connecting Minamiawaji, Hyogo on Awaji Island with Naruto, Tokushima on Ōge Island, Japan. Completed in 1985, it has a main span of 876 metres (2,874 ft). Although it is one of the largest bridges in the world, it is dwarfed by the Akashi-Kaikyo Bridge, which is on the same route. In 2004, 6.8 million cars and trucks crossed this bridge, translating into a daily average of about 18,600.

The bridge is complemented by the Konaruto Bridge ("Small Naruto Bridge") and Muya Bridge between Ōge Island and Shikoku.

When the bridge was built, space was left for the proposed Shikoku Shinkansen; however, no progress has been made on the train line, so the space intended originally for the bullet trains is used as an observatory to see the Naruto whirlpools beneath the bridge.

== Naruto Whirlpools ==
The Ōnaruto Bridge over the Naruto Strait, Naruto

Recurring whirlpools known as the Naruto whirlpools, in the Naruto Strait, spanned by the bridge, are caused by tidal currents between the Seto Inland Sea and the Pacific Ocean passing over undersea ridges under the span, causing very strong eddy currents, some of which make large, deep whirlpools.

The bridge has a tourist attraction built into the south side anchor—the Uzunomichi Walkway—an enclosed walkway out to the south tower to allow visitors to view the swirls through side and floor windows, best seen during low tide. Tourist boats and other vessels circle the towers, allowing visitors to see the depth of the whirlpools up close, while the view from the bridge observatory lets visitors see the pattern created by the eddy currents extending out for quite a distance.
