= Tanshū =

Tanshū or Tanshu may refer to:

- Tanshū (丹州)
  - Tanshū, another name for Tanba Province.
  - Tanshū, another name for Tango Province.
    - Tamba and Tango are also called Ryōtan (両丹) or Nitan (二丹).
- Tanshū (但州)
  - Tanshū, another name for Tajima Province.
    - Tanba, Tango and Tajima are also called Santan (三たん, 三丹).
- Tanshū (淡州)
  - Tanshū, another name for Awaji Province.
