= Awaji ware =

Type of Japanese pottery

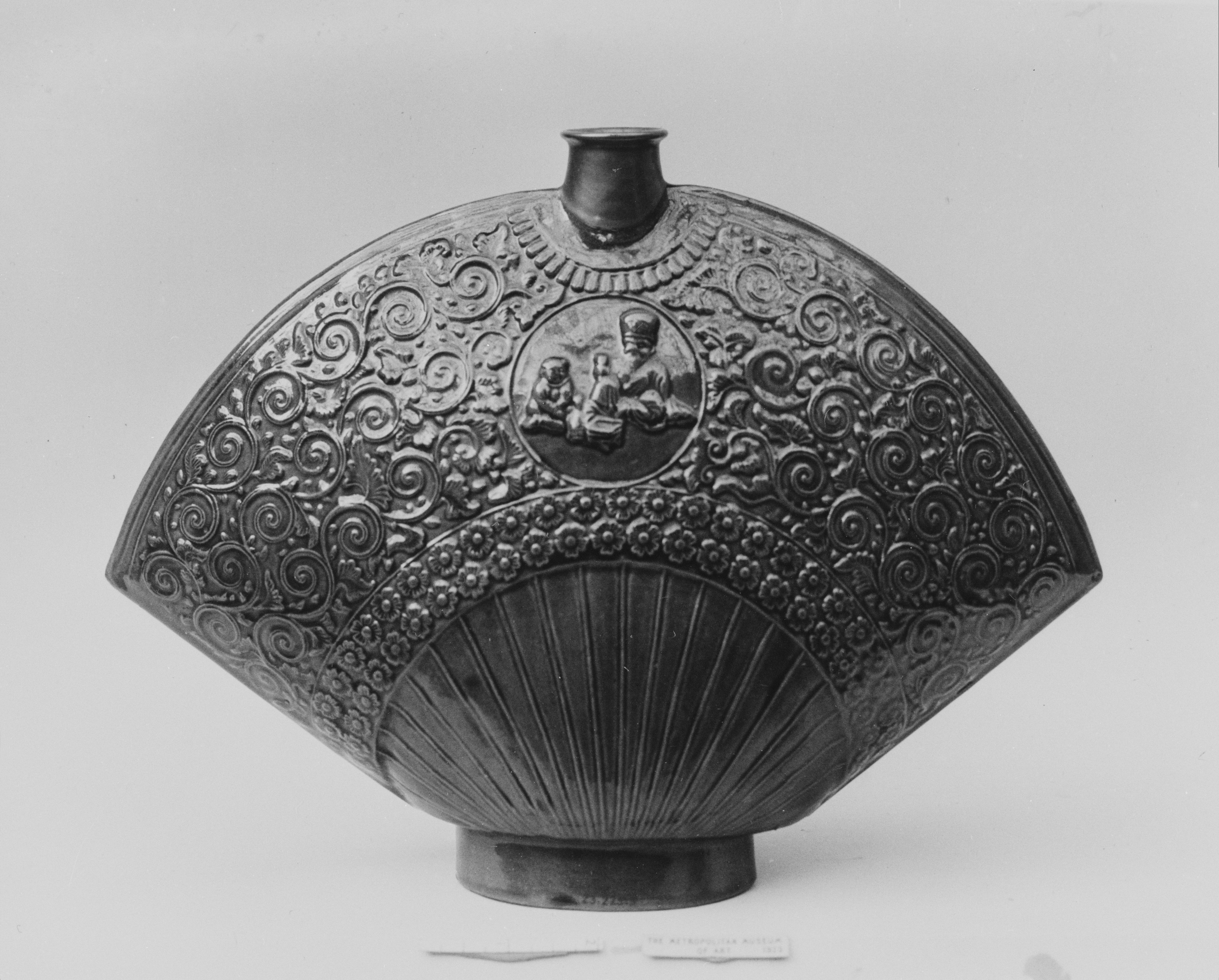
Porcelain bottle, c. 1840 (black and white photo)

Awaji ware (淡路焼, Awaji-yaki), also known as Minpei or Mimpei ware, is a type of Japanese pottery traditionally made on Awaji Island in the eastern part of the Seto Inland Sea, western Japan. Some pieces are porcelain, others described as glazed "porcelaneous ware" or "pottery".

== History ==
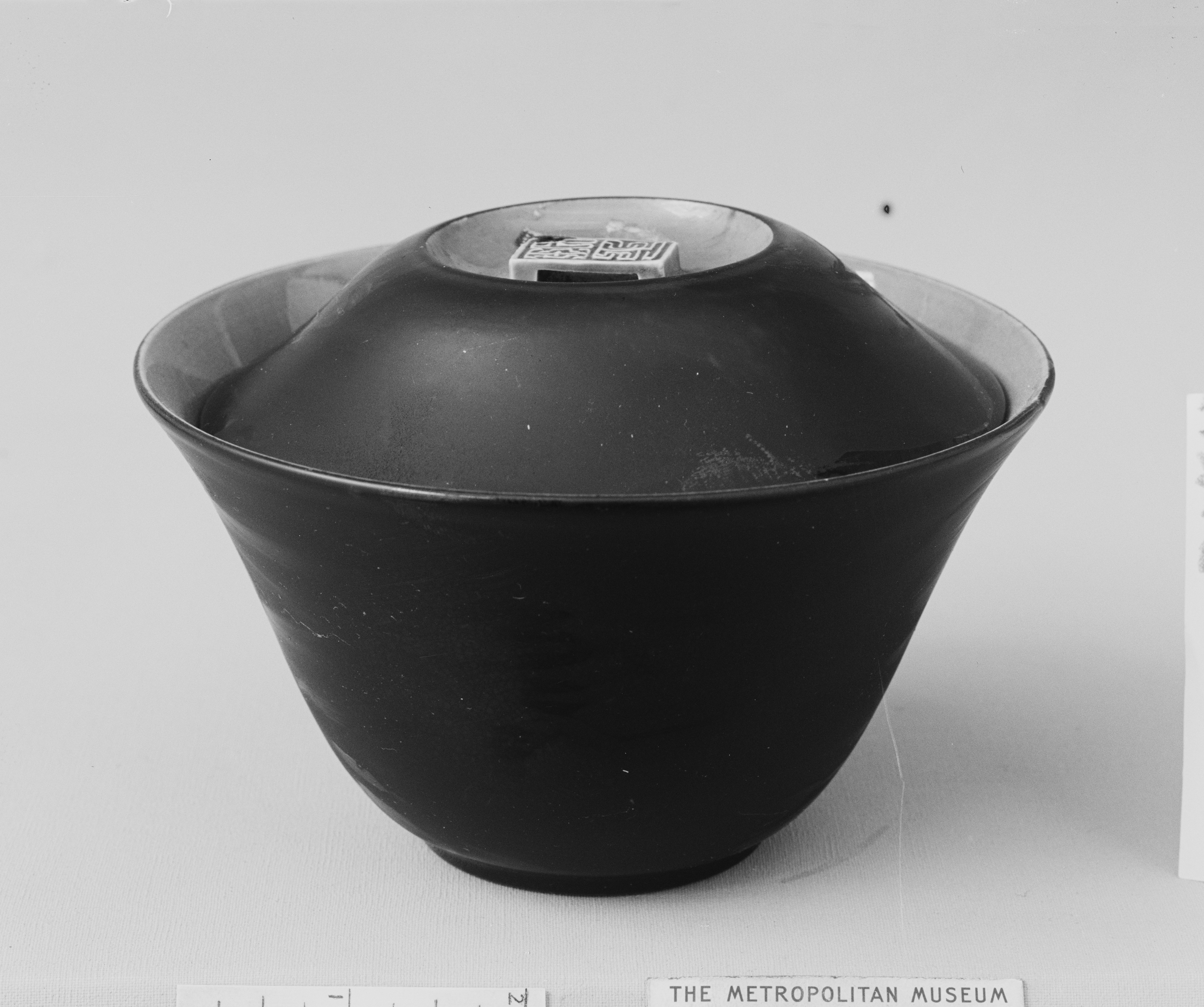
Black-glazed bowl and cover, "porcelaneous ware", 1840

Awaji ware was founded in the early 1830s by Minpei Kashu (1796–1871) (last name also spelled Mimpei) from Iga village. Coming from a wealthy trading family, he was a scholar of classical literature and skillful in the art of chanoyu. He became concerned about the development of industrial resources in his province and devoted himself to the manufacture of ceramics, which he had studied under Ogata Shuhei (1788-1839), a famous Kyoto potter. Returning to his village after his studies, he established kilns in the fifth year of Tenpō (1835/1836) and devoted his whole fortune to his enterprises. Some sources give an earlier founding year of 1831. Lord Hachisuka of Awaji Province subsequently subsidized Minpei's manufactory and appointed him head of the workshops. Thus his efforts were successful, and his manufactory reached a prosperity such that its production equaled in value the rice harvest of the eleven surrounding villages. After Minpei's death in the second year of Bunkyū (1862) his successors continued manufacturing ceramics, which became a source of wealth for the province.

The Metropolitan Museum of Art has nine pieces of Minpei ware in its permanent collection.

== Characteristics ==
Awaji ware pieces are of a white or cream-colored clay and a blue or yellow glaze, sometimes also green, sharing similarities with sancai colours. There are pieces skillfully imitating Annan ware's articles and blue and white or blue-decorated porcelains.
