= Minamiawaji =

Minamiawaji 南あわじ市
- City
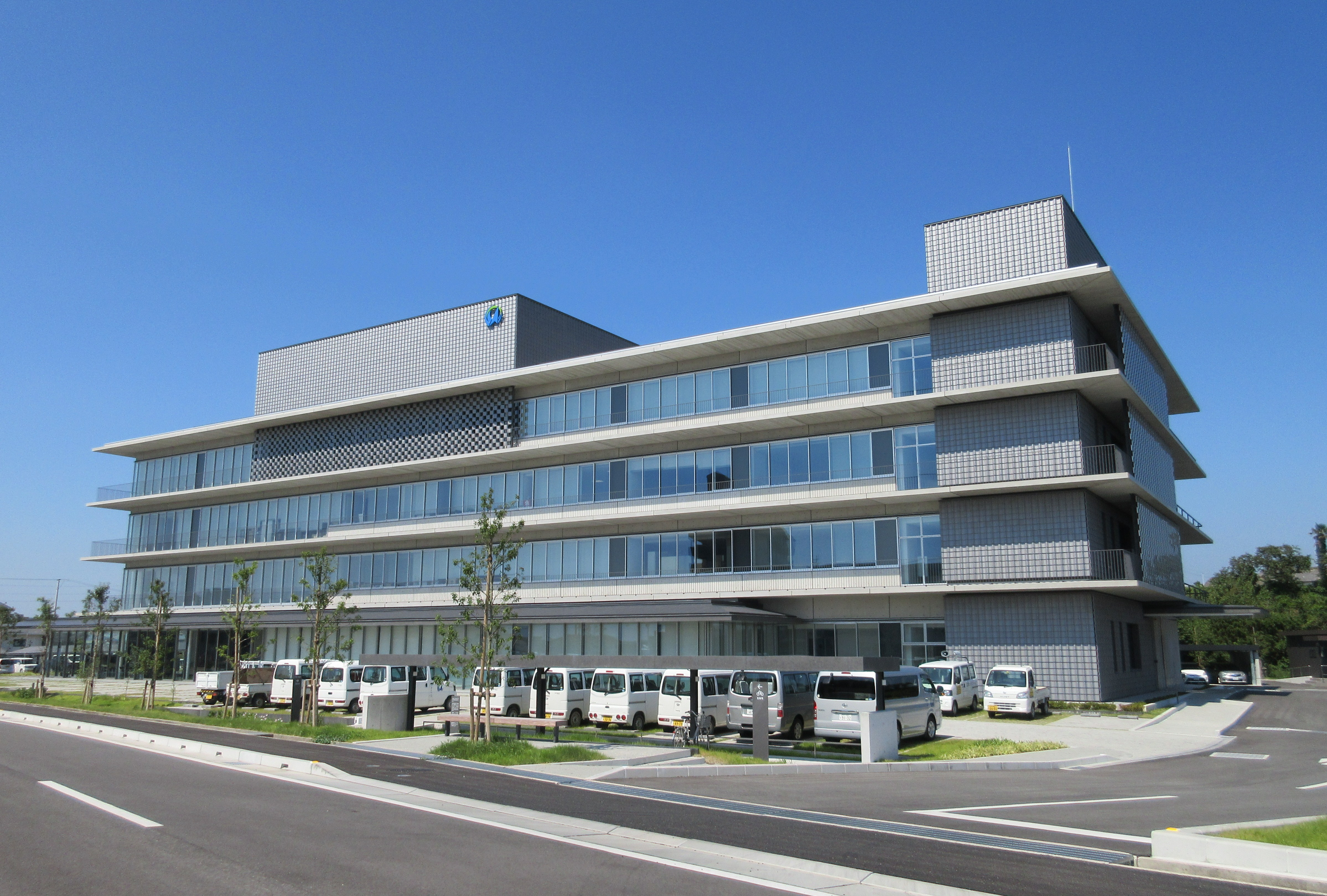
- Minamiawaji City Hall

- Flag Emblem
- Interactive map of Minamiawaji
- Location in Japan
- Coordinates: 34°18′N 134°47′E
- Country: Japan
- Region: Kansai
- Prefecture: Hyōgo

Government
  - Mayor: Kazuhiro Morimoto

Area
  - Total: 229.01 km^{2} (88.42 sq mi)

Population (July 9, 2022)
  - Total: 45,489
  - Density: 198.63/km^{2} (514.46/sq mi)
- Time zone: UTC+09:00 (JST)
- City hall address: 22-1 Ichizenkoji, Minamiawaji-shi, Hyōgo-ken 656-0472
- Climate: Cfa
- Website: Official website

Minamiawaji (南あわじ市, Minamiawaji-shi; lit. "South Awaji City") is a city in the southern part of Awaji Island in Hyōgo Prefecture, Japan. As of 1 June 2022, the city had an estimated population of 45,489 in 19856 households, and a population density of 200 persons per km^{2}. The total area of the city is 229.01 square kilometres (88.42 sq mi).

== Geography ==
The city of Minamiawaji occupies the southern third of Awaji Island. It is connected to Tokushima Prefecture to the south by the Ōnaruto Bridge, connecting Awaji and Oge islands, and is located facing the Kii Channel and the Gulf of Harima on the Seto Inland Sea. There are no large rivers in the city, but there are many agricultural ponds. In the eastern part of the city is Mt. Yuzuruha, the highest peak in Awaji Island with an elevation of 607.9 meters. Minamiawaji also includes the small island of Nushima (沼島, Swamp island) off the southeast coast of Awaji Island, which is only accessible by ferry.

=== Surrounding municipalities ===
Hyogo Prefecture

- Sumoto

=== Climate ===
Climate data for Minamiawaji (2004−2020 normals, extremes 2004−present)
Month	Jan	Feb	Mar	Apr	May	Jun	Jul	Aug	Sep	Oct	Nov	Dec	Year
Record high °C (°F)	17.3 (63.1)	20.8 (69.4)	23.3 (73.9)	28.4 (83.1)	30.8 (87.4)	35.4 (95.7)	37.2 (99.0)	37.6 (99.7)	35.2 (95.4)	30.5 (86.9)	25.5 (77.9)	21.7 (71.1)	37.6 (99.7)
Mean daily maximum °C (°F)	9.9 (49.8)	10.9 (51.6)	14.2 (57.6)	19.0 (66.2)	23.6 (74.5)	26.5 (79.7)	29.9 (85.8)	31.8 (89.2)	28.5 (83.3)	23.4 (74.1)	18.0 (64.4)	12.4 (54.3)	20.7 (69.2)
Daily mean °C (°F)	5.8 (42.4)	6.3 (43.3)	9.1 (48.4)	13.8 (56.8)	18.6 (65.5)	22.3 (72.1)	26.1 (79.0)	27.4 (81.3)	24.0 (75.2)	18.7 (65.7)	13.3 (55.9)	8.3 (46.9)	16.1 (61.0)
Mean daily minimum °C (°F)	1.7 (35.1)	1.9 (35.4)	4.0 (39.2)	8.4 (47.1)	13.7 (56.7)	18.8 (65.8)	23.3 (73.9)	24.0 (75.2)	20.4 (68.7)	14.6 (58.3)	8.8 (47.8)	4.2 (39.6)	12.0 (53.6)
Record low °C (°F)	−4.3 (24.3)	−5.0 (23.0)	−3.3 (26.1)	−0.1 (31.8)	3.8 (38.8)	10.0 (50.0)	18.1 (64.6)	15.9 (60.6)	13.0 (55.4)	5.7 (42.3)	0.8 (33.4)	−2.1 (28.2)	−5.0 (23.0)
Average precipitation mm (inches)	36.8 (1.45)	58.1 (2.29)	87.5 (3.44)	89.6 (3.53)	114.9 (4.52)	170.9 (6.73)	197.3 (7.77)	143.3 (5.64)	225.2 (8.87)	185.6 (7.31)	73.8 (2.91)	73.9 (2.91)	1,417.4 (55.80)
Average precipitation days (≥ 1.0 mm)	4.8	7.3	8.8	8.9	8.3	10.3	10.1	7.2	9.8	8.5	6.0	6.4	96.4
Mean monthly sunshine hours	164.2	154.2	198.5	212.2	222.3	167.8	193.0	246.7	172.1	167.3	152.0	146.5	2,201.6
Source: JMA

== Demographics ==
Per Japanese census data, the population of Minamiawaji has been declining steadily over the past 30 years.

Historical population
Year	Pop.	±%
1960	64,789	—
1970	58,072	−10.4%
1980	57,744	−0.6%
1990	57,526	−0.4%
2000	54,979	−4.4%
2010	49,853	−9.3%

== History ==
The city of Minamiawaji is situated in ancient Awaji Province. It was ruled as part of Tokushima Domain during the Edo period. After the Meiji restoration, it became part of Mihara District, Hyōgo. The town of Yura was established with the creation of the modern municipalities system April 1, 1889. On April 29, 1955 it changed its name to Nandan. The city of Minamiawaji was established on January 11, 2005, from the merger of all four towns of the former Mihara District: Nandan, Mihara, Midori, and Seidan.

== Government ==
Minamiawaji has a mayor-council form of government with a directly elected mayor and a unicameral city council of 20 members. Minamiawaji contributes one member to the Hyogo Prefectural Assembly. In terms of national politics, the city is part of Hyōgo 9th district of the lower house of the Diet of Japan.

== Economy ==
The local economy is largely rural, and is based on agriculture and commercial fishing. Minamiawaji's soil and climate make it ideal for growing onions. As such, Awaji onions are renowned across Japan as sweet and delicious.

== Education ==
Minamiawaji has 14 public elementary schools and four public middle schools operated by the city government and one public high school operated by the Hyōgo Prefectural Department of Education. There are also one private elementary school and one private middle school. Kibi International University's Faculty of Regional Creation Agriculture and the Kobe University Faculty of Maritime Sciences International Maritime Education and Research Center Awaji Marine Training Facility are located in Minamiawaji.

== Transportation ==
=== Railway ===
Minamiawaji does not have any passenger rail service.

=== Highways ===
- Kobe-Awaji-Naruto Expressway
- National Route 28

=== Other ===
Jointly with Awaji and Sumoto, the city operates a low-cost electric bike rental scheme, designed to attract visitors to stay for more than one day in order to explore the island.

== Local attractions ==
- Awaji Kokubun-ji, National Historic Site
- Naruto whirlpools, which form when the changing tidal currents are forced through the Naruto Strait.
- Mihara town in Minamiawaji is home to a puppet museum which houses numerous examples of locally crafted puppets. This art originated in the area.

== Notable people from Minamiawaji ==
- Kiichiro Higuchi, general in the Imperial Japanese Army
- Shintarō Hirase, marine biologist
- Yoichirō Hirase, marine biologist
- Ōuchi Hyōei, economist
- Tokubei Kuroda, marine biologist
- Kento Masaki, paralympic judo practitioner
- Kazuyuki Okitsu, voice actor
- Shohé Tanaka, physicist
