= Nandan, Hyōgo =

Dissolved municipality in Hyōgo prefecture, Japan

Nandan (南淡町, Nandan-chō) was a town located in Mihara District, Hyōgo Prefecture, Japan. It consisted of a part of Awaji Island and the much smaller Nushima (沼島, Swamp island). It is located at the southern end of Awaji island, from which it also derived its name.

As of 2003, the town had an estimated population of 18,921 and a density of 217.63 persons per km^{2}. The total area was 86.94 km^{2}.

On January 11, 2005, Nandan, along with the towns of Mihara, Midori and Seidan (all from Mihara District), was merged to create the city of Minamiawaji.
