= Midori, Hyōgo =

Dissolved municipality in Hyōgo prefecture, Japan

Midori (緑町, Midori-chō) was a town located in Mihara District, Hyōgo Prefecture, Japan.

As of 2003, the town had an estimated population of 6,202 and a density of 222.37 persons per km^{2}. The total area was 27.89 km^{2}.

On January 11, 2005, Midori, along with the towns of Mihara, Nandan and Seidan (all from Mihara District), was merged to create the city of Minamiawaji.
