= Egongyan Rail Transit Bridge =

Egongyan Rail Transit Bridge 鹅公岩軌道大桥
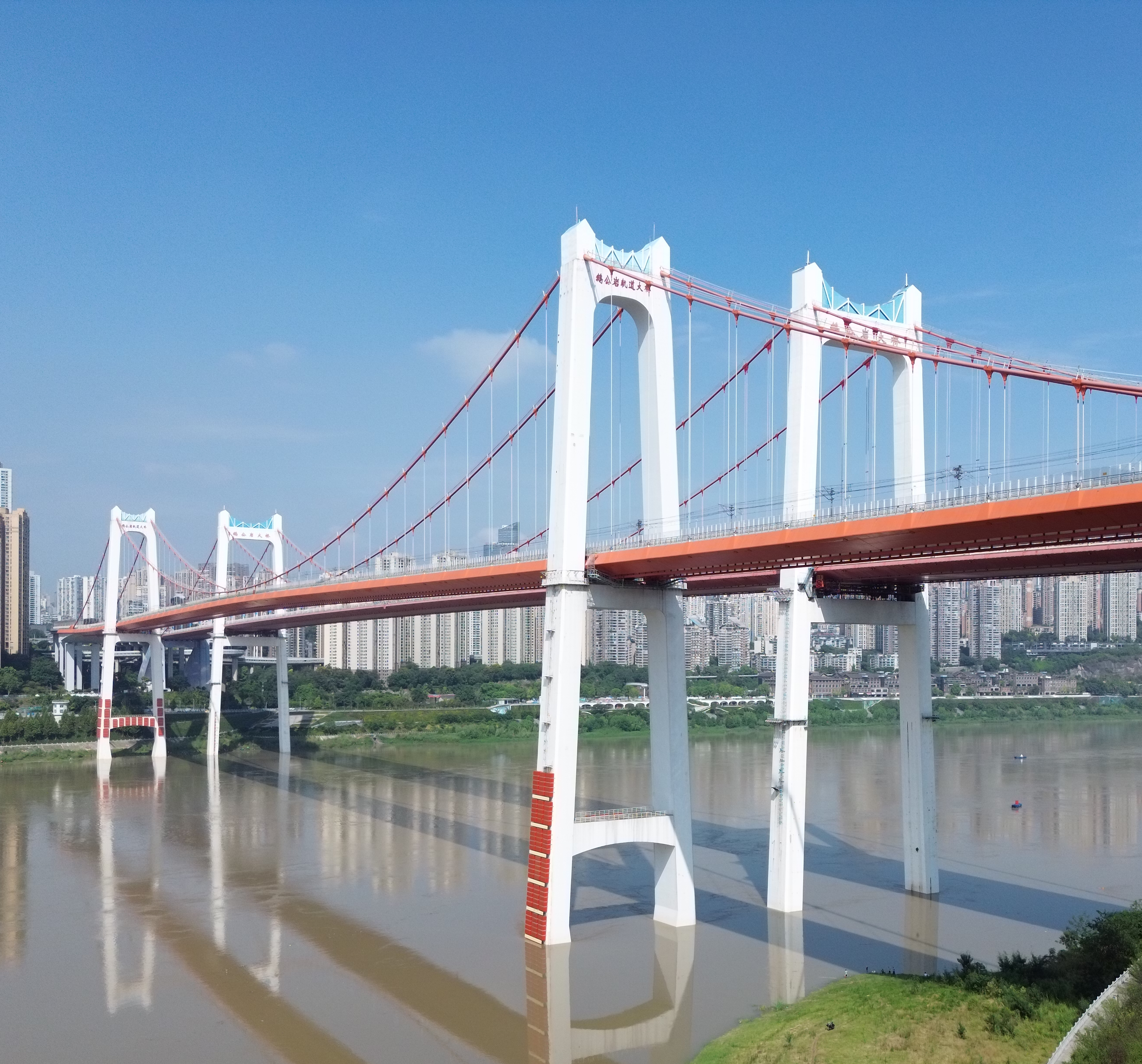
- Coordinates: 29°31′10.8″N 106°31′56.7″E
- Carries: Two tracks of the Loop line and pedestrian path
- Crosses: Yangtze River
- Locale: Chongqing, China

Characteristics
- Total length: 1,650.5 metres (5,415 ft)
- Longest span: 600 metres (1,969 ft)

History
- Opened: 30 December 2019

Location
- Interactive map of Egongyan Rail Transit Bridge

The Egongyan Rail Transit Bridge is a suspension bridge carrying the Chongqing Rail Transit Loop line across the Yangtze. It connects Jiulongpo District in the west with Nan'an District in the east. The Egongyan Rail Transit Bridge is located about 70 meters upstream of the old Egongyan Bridge which carries only road traffic. The overall bridge is 1,650.5 metres (5,415 ft) long, with a 600-metre (2,000 ft) main span, making it the longest cable supported transit only bridge in the world by main span.
