= Japanese ship Awaji =

Two ships of the Japanese Navy have been named Awaji:

- Japanese escort ship Awaji, a Mikura-class escort ship launched in 1943 and sunk in 1944
- JS Awaji (MSO-304), an Awaji-class minesweeper launched in 2015
