= Egongyan Bridge =

Egongyan Bridge 鹅公岩大桥
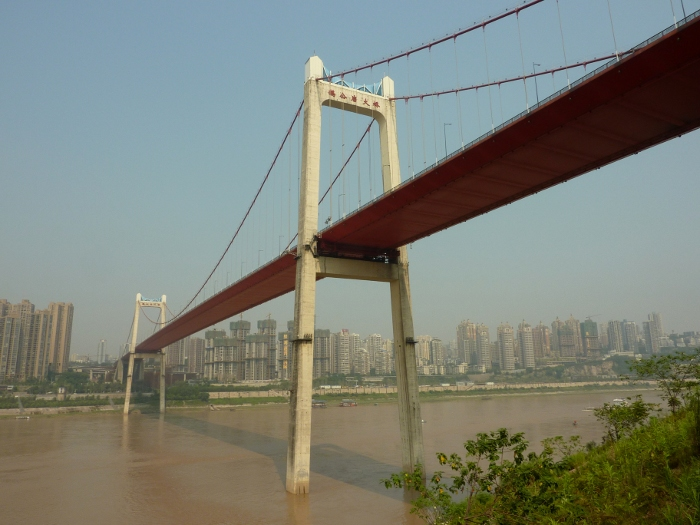
- Coordinates: 29°31′23.7″N 106°31′41.02″E
- Carries: 8 lanes of Longteng Avenue
- Crosses: Yangtze River
- Locale: Chongqing, China

Characteristics
- Design: Suspension Bridge
- Total length: 1,420 metres (4,660 ft)
- Longest span: 600 metres (2,000 ft)

History
- Opened: 2000

Location
- Interactive map of Egongyan Bridge

Egongyan Bridge
- Traditional Chinese: 鵝公岩大橋
- Simplified Chinese: 鹅公岩大桥
Transcriptions
Standard Mandarin
- Hanyu Pinyin: Égōngyán Dàqiáo

The Egongyan Bridge is a suspension bridge which crosses the Yangtze River in Chongqing, China. Completed in 2000, it has a main span of 600 metres (2,000 ft). The connects Nan'an District east of the Yangtze River with Jiulongpo District to the west. Originally, the bridge was built with to be six lanes wide with a pedestrian walkway on each side but was expanded to eight lanes in 2013. The expansion removed the walkways. Pedestrian connectivity was restored in 2019 with the opening of the Egongyan Rail Transit Bridge upstream which has a pedestrian walkway.

== See also ==
- List of longest suspension bridge spans
- Yangtze River bridges and tunnels
