= Seidan, Hyōgo =

Dissolved municipality in Hyōgo prefecture, Japan

Seidan (西淡町, Seidan-chō) was a town located in Mihara District, Hyōgo Prefecture, Japan.

== Population ==
As of 2003, the town had an estimated population of 12,004 and a density of 214.40 persons per km^{2}. The total area was 55.99 km^{2}.

== History ==
On January 11, 2005, Seidan, along with the towns of Mihara, Midori and Nandan (all from Mihara District), was merged to create the city of Minamiawaji.
