= Puli Bridge =

Puli Bridge 普立大桥
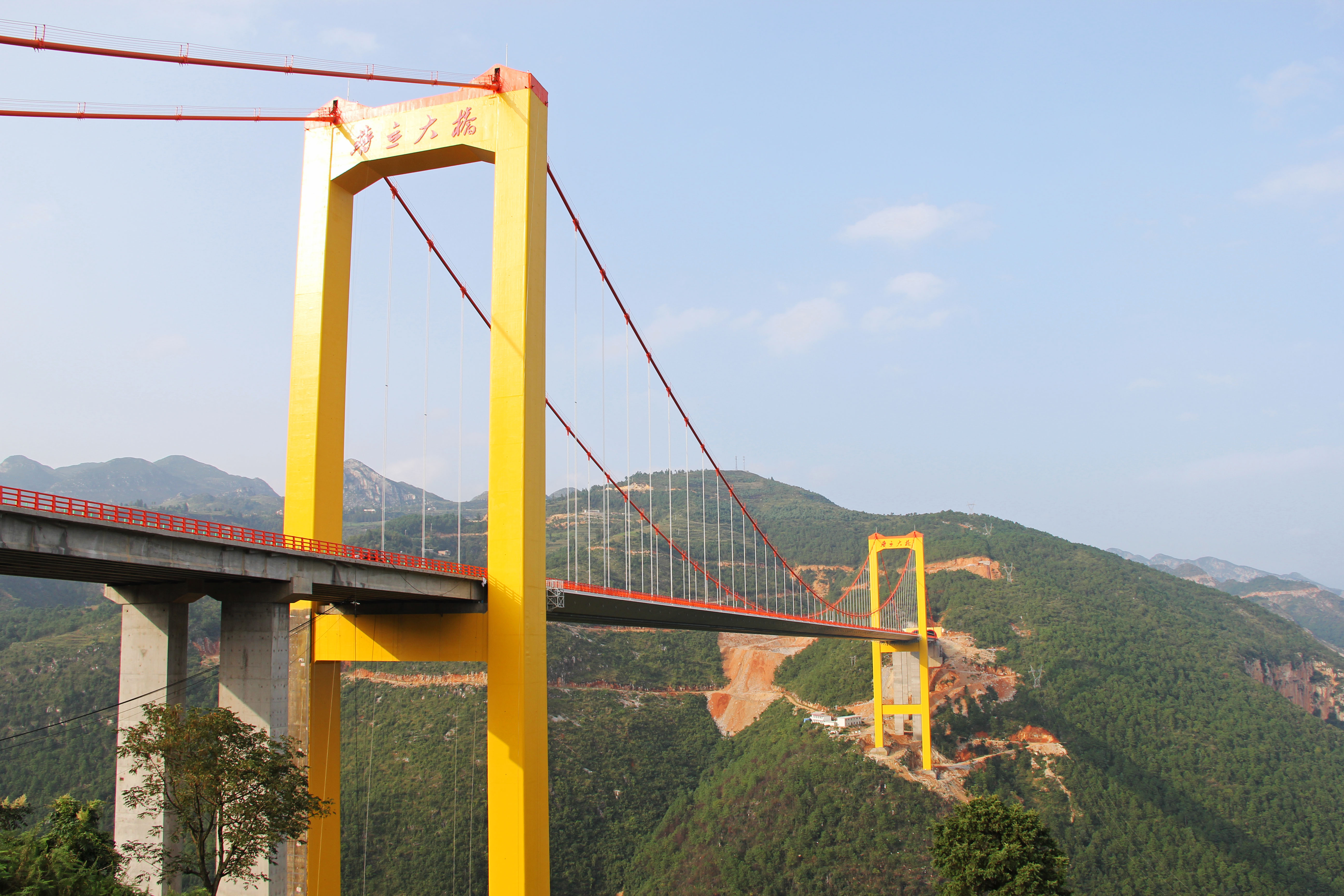
- Coordinates: 26.323114°N 104.586747°E
- Carries: G56 Hangzhou–Ruili Expressway
- Locale: Xuanwei, Qujing, China

Characteristics
- Design: Suspension
- Material: Steel
- Width: 25.4 m (83 ft)
- Height: 154 m (505 ft)
- Longest span: 628 m (2,060 ft)
- Clearance below: 500 m (1,600 ft) (Note: There is some discrepancy among references regarding the height of the bridge deck above the bottom of the valley. www.wanhuajing.com Archived 2016-02-12 at the Wayback Machine lists the height as 500 m and states it is the third highest in the world. www.highestbridges.com lists the height as 485 m. Guo et al. state the distance from tower top to valley floor is 450 m.)

History
- Designer: 中交公路规划设计院
- Constructed by: 中铁大桥局
- Construction start: Nov 8, 2011
- Construction end: May 10, 2015
- Opened: Aug 25, 2015

Statistics
- Toll: Car 20 RMB, Truck 1.15RMB/EA·KM

Location
- Interactive map of Puli Bridge

Puli Bridge (Chinese: 普立大桥) is a suspension bridge near Xuanwei, Qujing, China. The bridge, at 485 m (1,591 ft), is one of the highest in the world. The bridge forms part of the G56 Hangzhou–Ruili Expressway between Liupanshui and Xuanwei and was opened in August 2015. The bridge and associated expressway reduced the travel time from Xuanwei to the Guizhou border from four hours to one hour. The bridge crosses a small stream beside the Gexiang River gorge.

== Design and construction ==
The Puli Bridge has a main span of 628 meters (2,060 feet) and a total length of 1,040 meters (3,410 feet). The road deck is 24.5 meters (80 feet) wide and the main suspension cables are 26 meters (85 feet) apart. The bridge cost 440 million yuan (about US$71 million) and officially opened to traffic on August 25, 2015. Similar to the Sidu River Bridge, the first cable used to erect the span (the pilot cable) was placed using a rocket.
