= Mihara, Hyōgo =

Dissolved municipality in Hyōgo prefecture, Japan

Mihara (三原町, Mihara-chō) was a town located in Mihara District, Hyōgo Prefecture, Japan.

As of 2003, the town had an estimated population of 16,511 and a density of 282.96 persons per km^{2}. The total area was 58.35 km^{2}.

On January 11, 2005, Mihara, along with the towns of Midori, Nandan and Seidan (all from Mihara District), was merged to create the city of Minamiawaji.
