= Dimuhe River Bridge =

Dimuhe River Bridge 抵母河特大桥
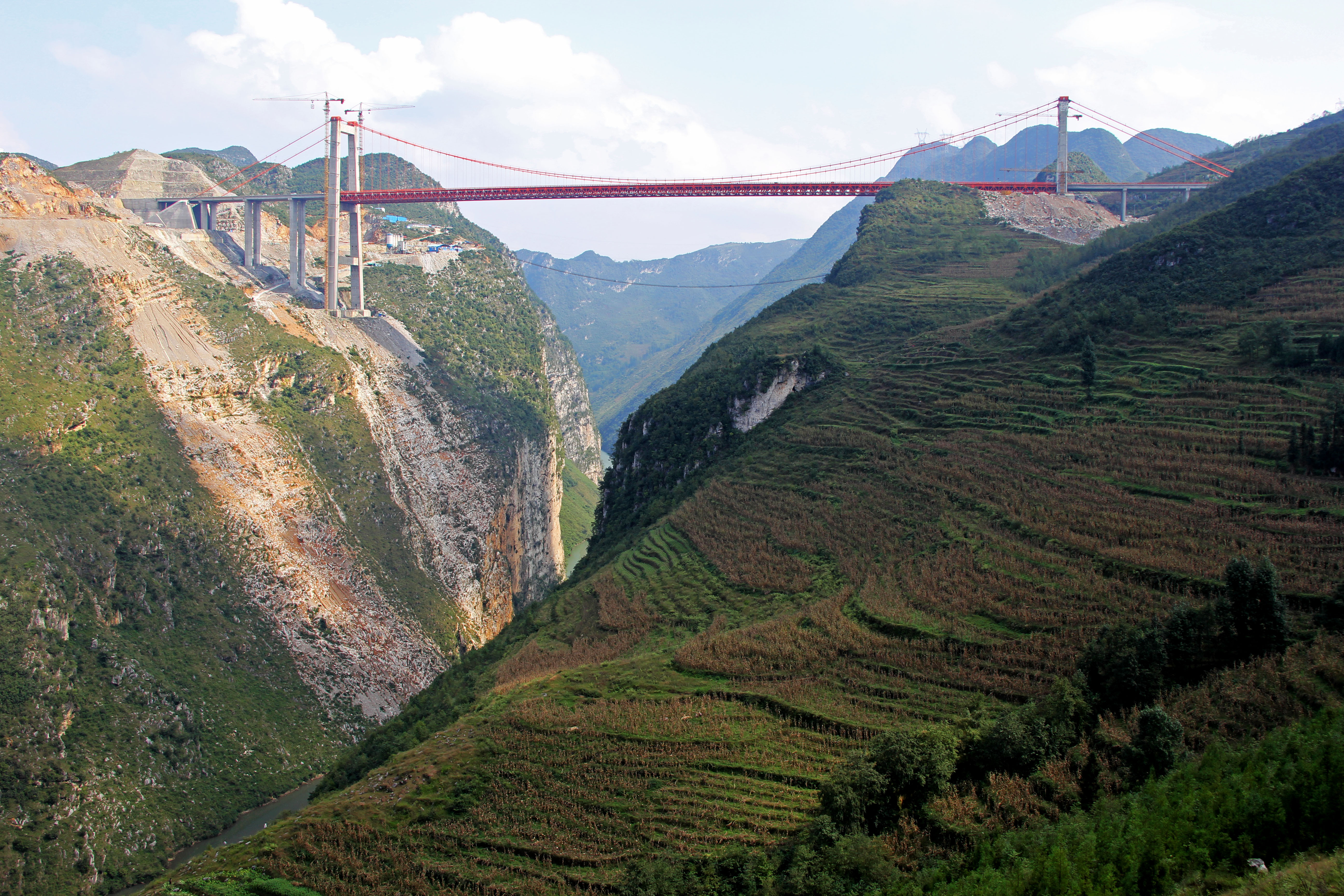
- Coordinates: 26.655638°N 105.068414°E
- Carries: G56 Hangzhou–Ruili Expressway
- Crosses: Sancha River
- Locale: Liupanshui, Guizhou, China

Characteristics
- Design: Suspension
- Material: Steel
- Height: 360 m (1,180 ft)
- Longest span: 538 m (1,765 ft)
- Clearance below: 340 m (1,120 ft)

History
- Opened: 2015-12-26

Location
- Interactive map of Dimuhe River Bridge

The Dimuhe River Bridge is a suspension bridge near Liupanshui, Guizhou, China. With a road deck 360 m (1,180 ft) high, this is one of the highest suspension bridges in world. The bridge carries the G56 Hangzhou–Ruili Expressway over a shallow reservoir between Liupanshui and Bijie, and was opened in 2015.

Although Dimuhe River Bridge is officially 360 metres high, the bridge crosses over the shallow reservoir leaving 340 meters of height from the deck to the lake surface when the reservoir is full. The reservoir is along the Sancha River, the headwaters of the Wu River.
