= Fukura =

Fukura (written: 福良) is a Japanese surname. Notable people with the surname include:

- Junichi Fukura (福良 淳一; born 1960), Japanese baseball player
- Katsumi Fukura (福良 勝己; born 1953), Japanese high jumper
- Ken Fukura (福良 拳󠄁; born 1993), Japanese producer also goes by the name Fukura P

== See also ==
- Fukura Station, a railway station in Yuza, Yamagata Prefecture, Japan
