= Naruto Strait =

Strait between Awaji and Shikoku islands, Japan

Coordinates: 34°14′29″N 134°39′04″E

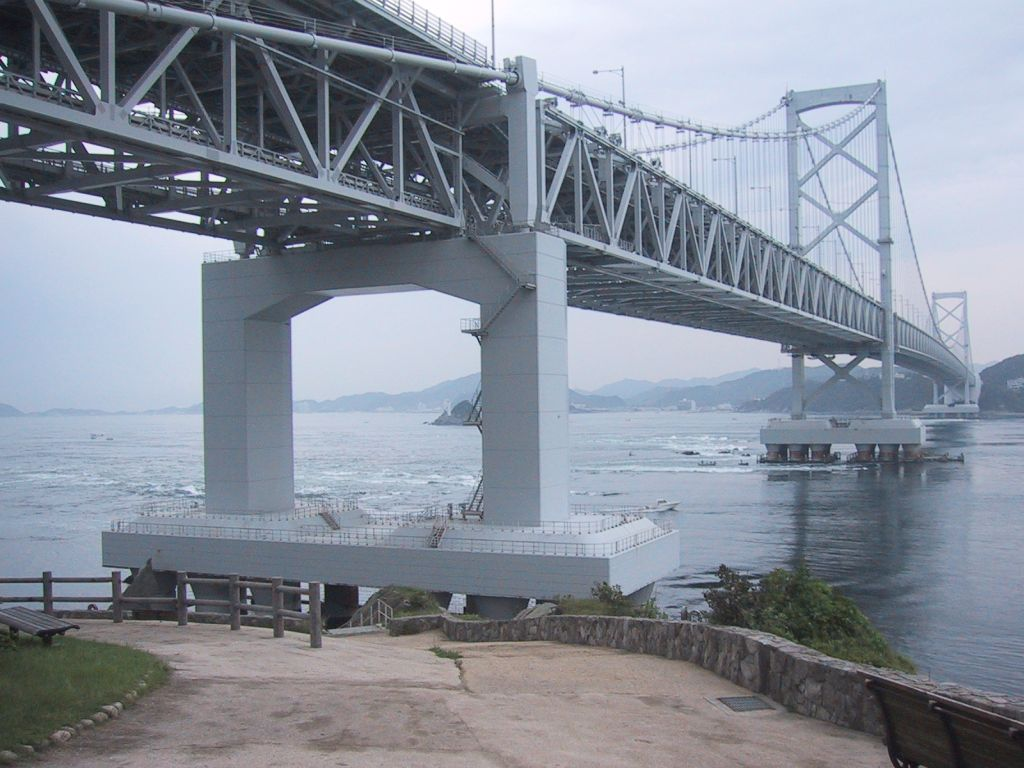
Naruto Strait, viewed from Awaji, spanned by Ōnaruto Bridge

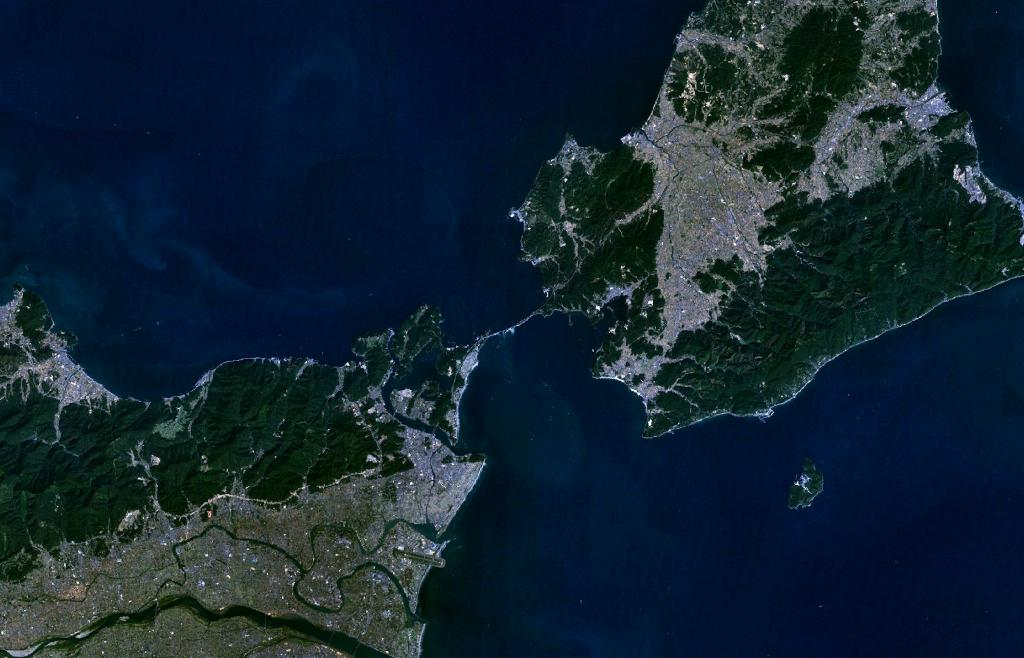
Naruto strait as seen from space

Naruto Strait (鳴門海峡, Naruto-kaikyō) is a strait between Awaji Island and Shikoku in Japan. It connects Harima Nada, the eastern part of the Inland Sea and the Kii Channel. A famous feature of the strait is the Naruto whirlpools. In 1950, it was included as part of the Setonaikai National Park.

Ōnaruto Bridge, the southern part of the Kobe-Awaji-Naruto Expressway, crosses over it. It was built in 1985, leading to the cessation of ferry services in 1995 due to low demand. Mopeds are forbidden from driving on the bridge for safety reasons.

An annual "Whirlpool Opening" celebration is held every year with the arrival of the spring tide by Naruto City's tourism association. The strong currents of the strait create vortexes that can reach up to 20 meters in diameter at a speed of 20 kph.

== Hazards ==
Awa Prefecture's Naruto Strait is, alongside the Irago Strait and the Tone River, considered to be one of the "Big Three" of perilous waters in Japan.

Although the strait is a major shipping route, the navigational width is only 500m. The Tokushima Coast Guard gives ships an official warning to wait for the tide to change when the current is strong. Between 2002 and 2006, there were 15 accidents at sea in the Naruto Strait. 8 of these collisions were under the Naruto Bridge, with 5 others being the result of ships being swept under by the strong currents.
