= Mihara District =

Former district in Hyōgo prefecture, Japan

Mihara (三原郡, Mihara-gun) was a district located in Hyōgo Prefecture, Japan.

As of 2003, the district had an estimated population of 53,638 and a density of 234.05 persons per km^{2}. The total area was 229.17 km^{2}.

== Former towns and villages ==
- Midori
- Mihara
- Nandan
- Seidan

== Merger ==
- On January 11, 2005 - the towns of Midori, Mihara, Nandan and Seidan were merged to create the city of Minamiawaji. Mihara District was dissolved as a result of this merger.
