= Awaji Province =

Former province of Japan

Map of Japanese provinces (1868) with Awaji Province highlighted

Awaji Province (淡路国, Awaji no Kuni; Japanese pronunciation: [ä́.β̞ä̀.(ɟ͡)ʑì (nò̞ kɯ̈̀.ɲ̟ì)], formerly 淡道) was an old province of Japan covering Awaji Island, between Honshū and Shikoku. Today it is part of Hyōgo Prefecture. It is sometimes called Tanshu (淡州). Awaji is divided into three municipal sections: Awaji is the northernmost section, Sumoto is the most urban and central section, and four southern towns make up the city of Minamiawaji.

It was founded in the 7th century as a part of Nankaidō. In Nankaidō, Awaji Province was between Kii Province and Awa Province. Awaji means literally "Road to Awa", that is, the road to Awa Province from the central part of Japan. Awaji Province was divided into two districts: Tsuna no Kōri in the northern part and Mihara no Kōri in the southern part.

The provincial government was presumably in modern Minamiawaji, Hyōgo but its relics have not been found yet.

Awaji Province was a common destination for political exiles. Emperor Junnin was exiled in Awaji after his abdication until his death.

In the Edo period, Awaji Province was governed by the Hachisuka clan in Tokushima, Awa Province. When the han system were abolished and prefectures were organized, the inhabitants of Awaji Province preferred to belong to Hyōgo Prefecture, not to Tokushima Prefecture, because of political conflict between Tokushima and Awaji.

== Historical districts ==
- Hyōgo Prefecture
  - Mihara District (三原郡; southern Awaji) – dissolved; now the city of Minamiawaji (南あわじ市)
  - Tsuna District (津名郡; northern Awaji) – dissolved; now the cities of Awaji (淡路市) and Sumoto (洲本市)
