= Awaji Island =

Island in Hyōgo Prefecture, Japan

Awaji
Native name: 淡路島 Awaji-shima
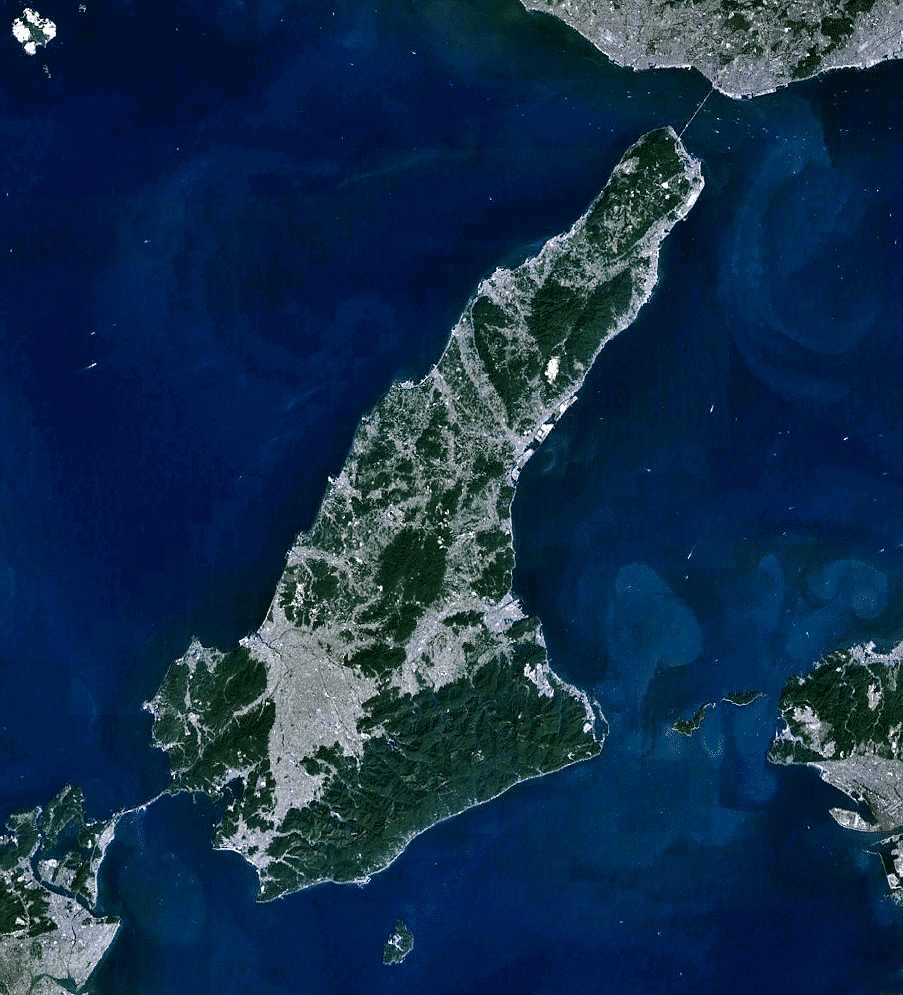
- Satellite view of Awaji Island

- Location within Japan Location within Hyōgo Prefecture

Geography
- Location: Seto Inland Sea
- Coordinates: 34°23′N 134°50′E
- Area: 592.17 km^{2} (228.64 sq mi)
- Length: 53 km (32.9 mi)
- Width: 28 km (17.4 mi)
- Highest elevation: 606 m (1988 ft)

Administration
- Japan
- Prefecture: Hyōgo Prefecture

Demographics
- Population: 129,000 (2019)
- Pop. density: 265/km^{2} (686/sq mi)
- Ethnic groups: Japanese

Awaji Island (淡路島, Awaji-shima; Japanese pronunciation: [ä́.β̞ä̀.(ɟ͡)ʑì, ä̀.β̞ä́.(ɟ͡)ʑí.ɕì.mä̀]) is an island in Hyōgo Prefecture, Japan, in the eastern part of the Seto Inland Sea between the islands of Honshū and Shikoku. The island has an area of 592.17 square kilometres (228.64 square miles). It is the largest island of the Seto Inland Sea.

Some scholars, such as Motoori Norinaga, have claimed that the name means "the road to Awa (阿波)", the historic province bordering the Shikoku side of the Naruto Strait (now part of Tokushima Prefecture), although this etymology is disputed. Others, including Tsugita Uruu, have interpreted the historical meaning of awa as 粟 "millet", due to a story where the kami Sukunabikona climbs a millet stalk on the island, as told in the Kojiki and Nihon Shoki; in these books, the island is referred to as Awaji no Honosawake no Shima (淡道之穂之狭別嶋(あはぢのほのさわけのしま)) – referencing the Japanese creation myth, where it was the first island created in Japan – and Awaji-shima (淡路洲), respectively.

== Geography ==
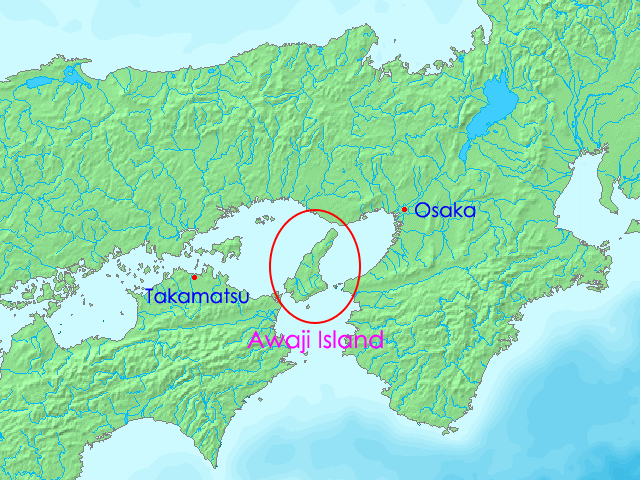
Awaji island map

The island is separated from Honshū by the Akashi Strait and from Shikoku by the Naruto Strait. Since April 5, 1998, it has been connected to Kobe on Honshū by the Akashi Kaikyo Bridge, the second longest suspension bridge in the world. Since its completion, the Kobe-Awaji-Naruto Expressway across the island has been the main eastern land link between Honshū and Shikoku. The Naruto whirlpools form in the strait between Naruto, Tokushima and Awaji.

The Nojima Fault, responsible for the 1995 Great Hanshin earthquake, cuts across the island. A section of the fault was protected and turned into the Nojima Fault Preservation Museum in the Hokudancho Earthquake Memorial Park (北淡町震災記念公園) to show how the movement in the ground cuts across roads, hedges and other installations. Outside of this protected area, the fault zone is less visible. The Onaruto Bridge Memorial Museum (大鳴門橋記念館, Ōnarutokyō Kinenkan) and the Uzushio Science Museum (うずしお科学館, Uzushio Kagakukan) are located near Fukura.

== History ==
According to the creation myth in Shinto, Awaji was the first of the ōyashima islands born from the kami Izanagi and Izanami. Awaji constituted a province between the 7th and the 19th century, Awaji Province, and was a part of Nankaidō. Today the island consists of three municipalities: Awaji, Sumoto, and Minamiawaji.

Awaji Ningyō Jōruri, a form of traditional puppet theater over 500 years old, is performed daily in the Awaji Ningyō Jōruri Hall (人形浄瑠璃館) or "Awaji Puppet Museum" in Minamiawaji, located in the southern part of the island. It is designated an Intangible Cultural Heritage of Japan. The Awaji puppets perform popular traditional dramas but have their origins in religious rituals.

Starting in the 1830s, the local potter Minpei started producing what would come to be known as Awaji ware, a type of Japanese pottery also known as Minpei ware.

Architect Tadao Ando has designed several structures on the island, including Hompuku-ji water temple (本福寺) and the Awaji Yumebutai complex, both located in Awaji City.

In 1995, Awaji Island was the epicenter of the Great Hanshin Earthquake, which killed over 5,500 people. The earthquake caused enormous damage around the northern part of the island, which experienced severe seismic waves of JMA intensity 7. The earthquake was due to the Nojima Fault, located near the epicenter, which was designated a national natural monument in 1998. In 2022, it was designated a IUGS geological heritage site.

== Municipalities ==
There are three municipalities in Awaji island: Awaji, Sumoto, and Minamiawaji. They are part of Hyōgo Prefecture.

Awaji municipality on Awaji Island

Sumoto municipality on Awaji Island

Minamiawaji municipality on Awaji Island

== Gallery ==
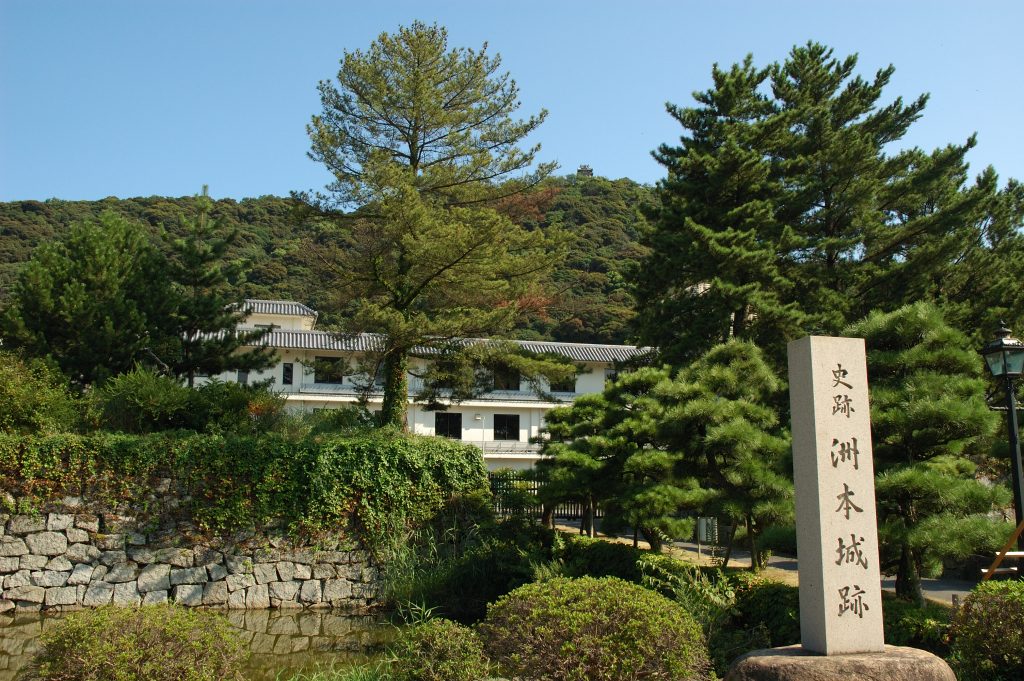
Sumoto Castle

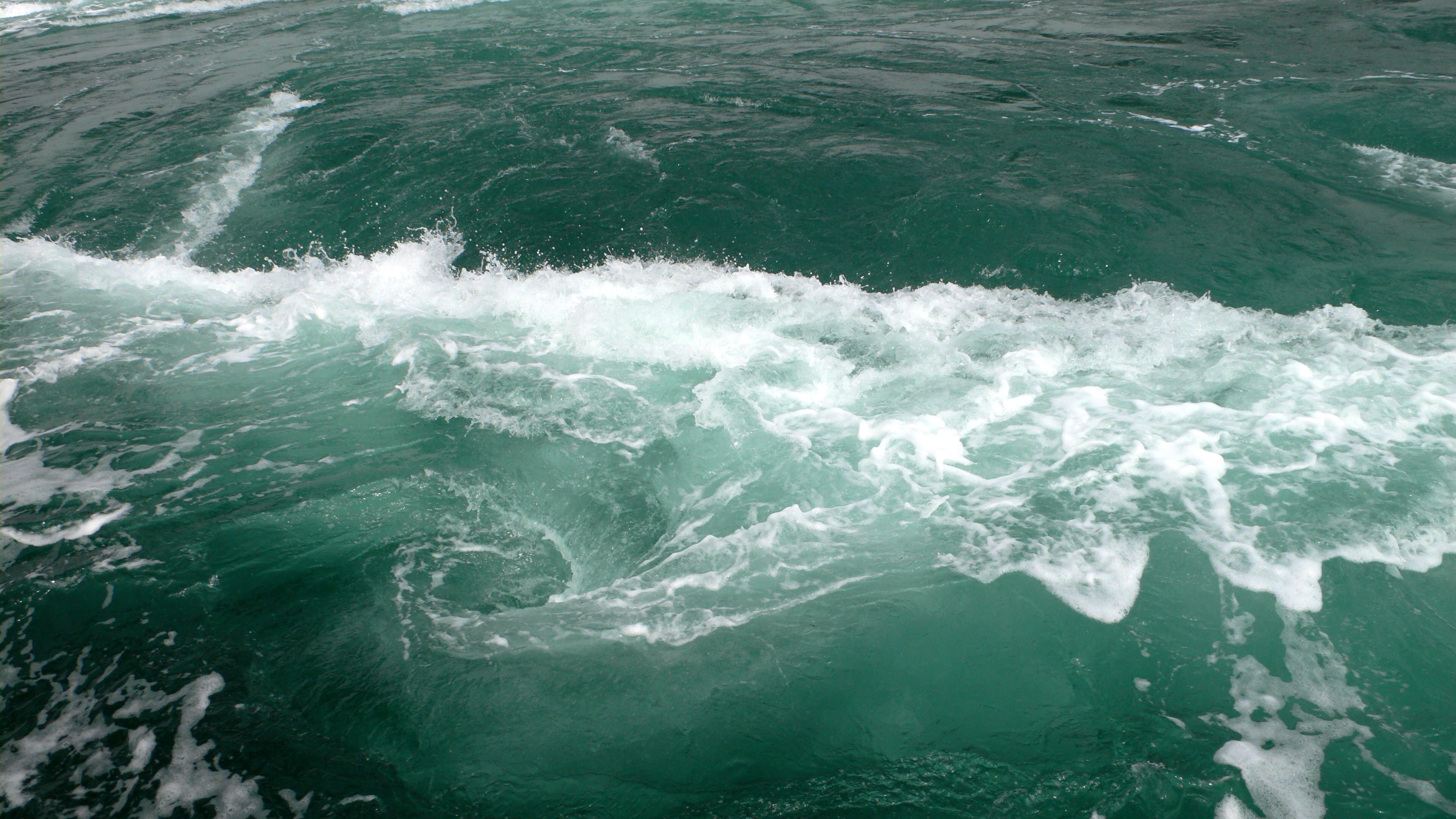
Naruto whirlpools

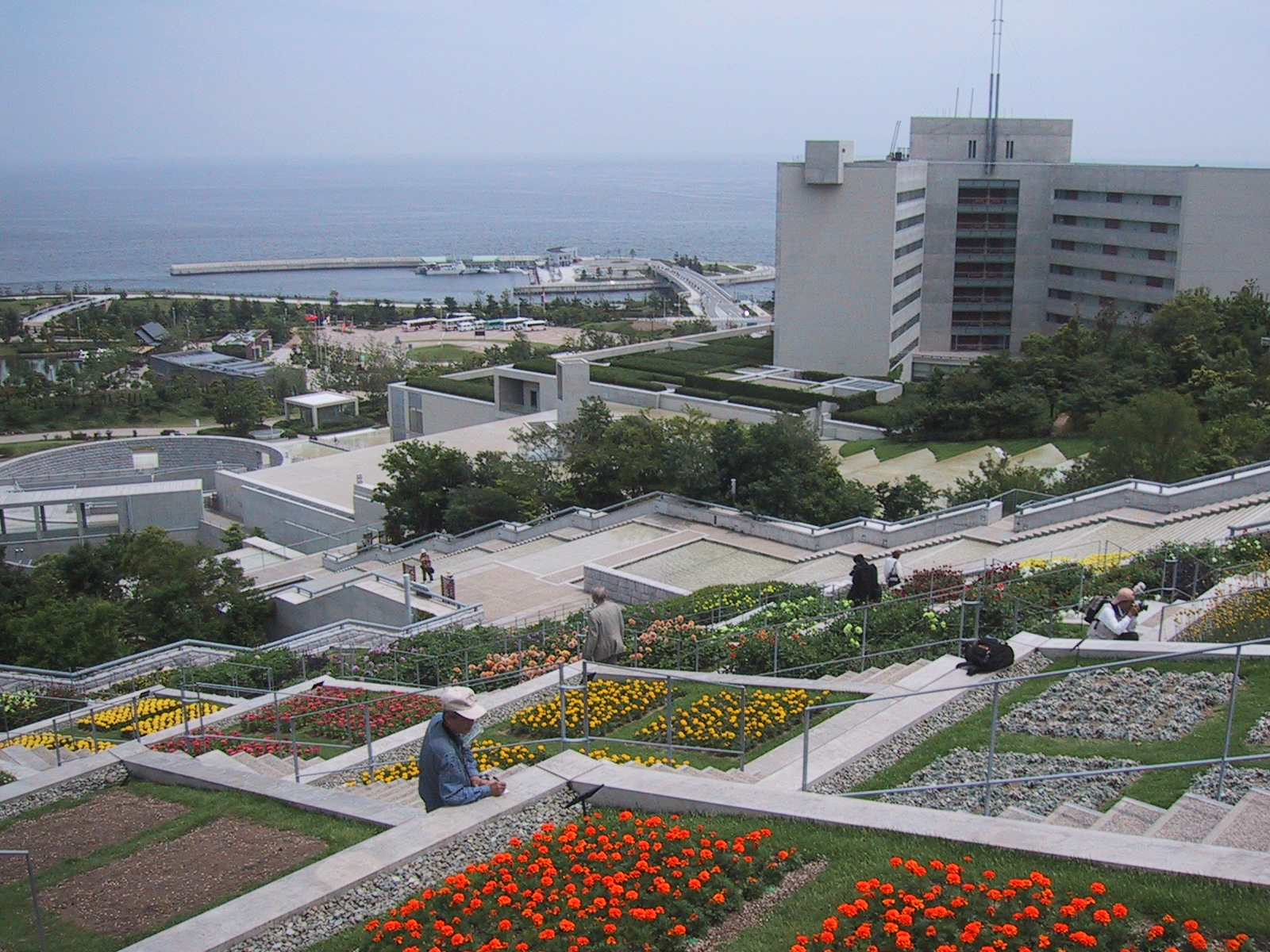
Awaji Yumebutai flower beds

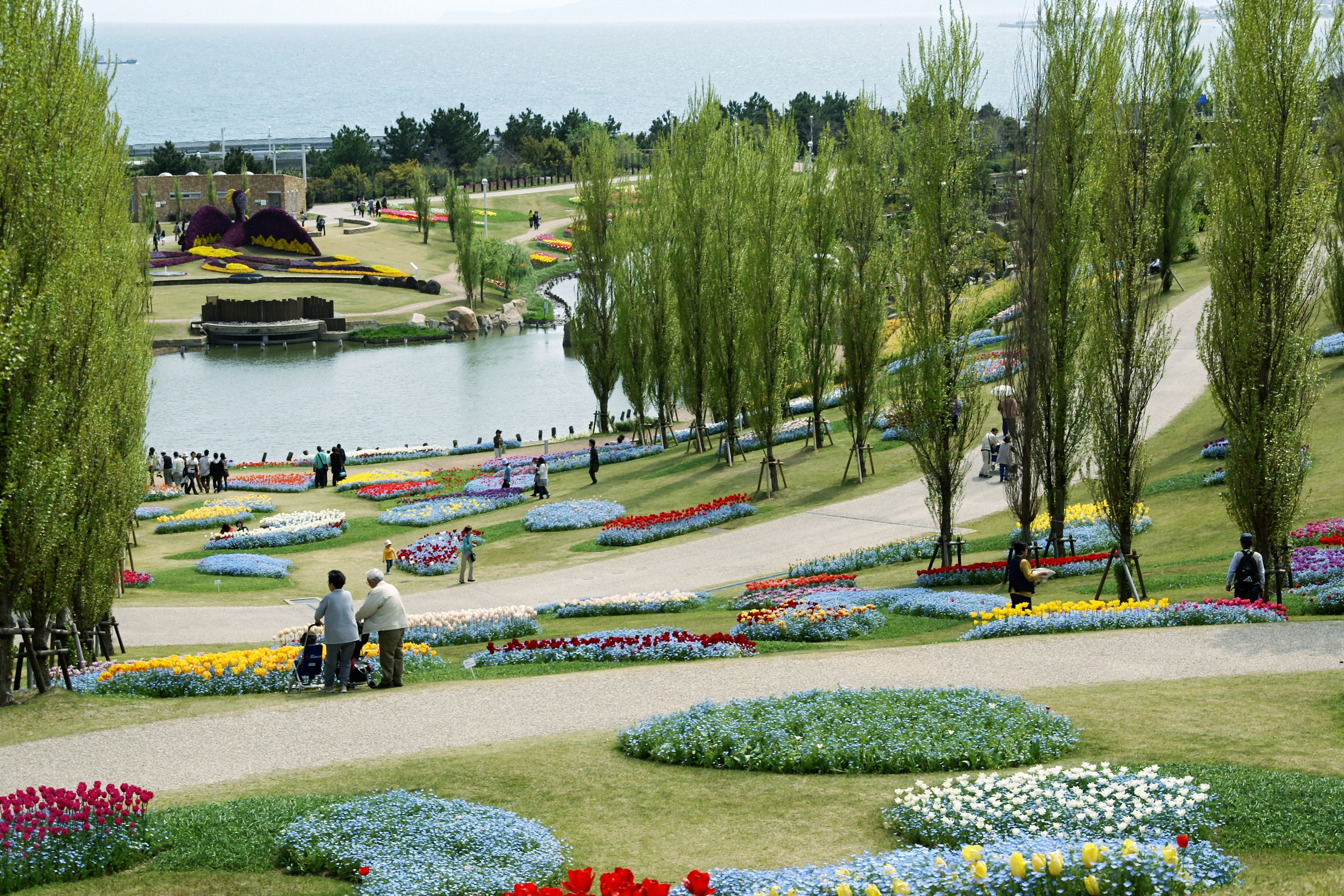
Akashi-Kaikyō National Government Park

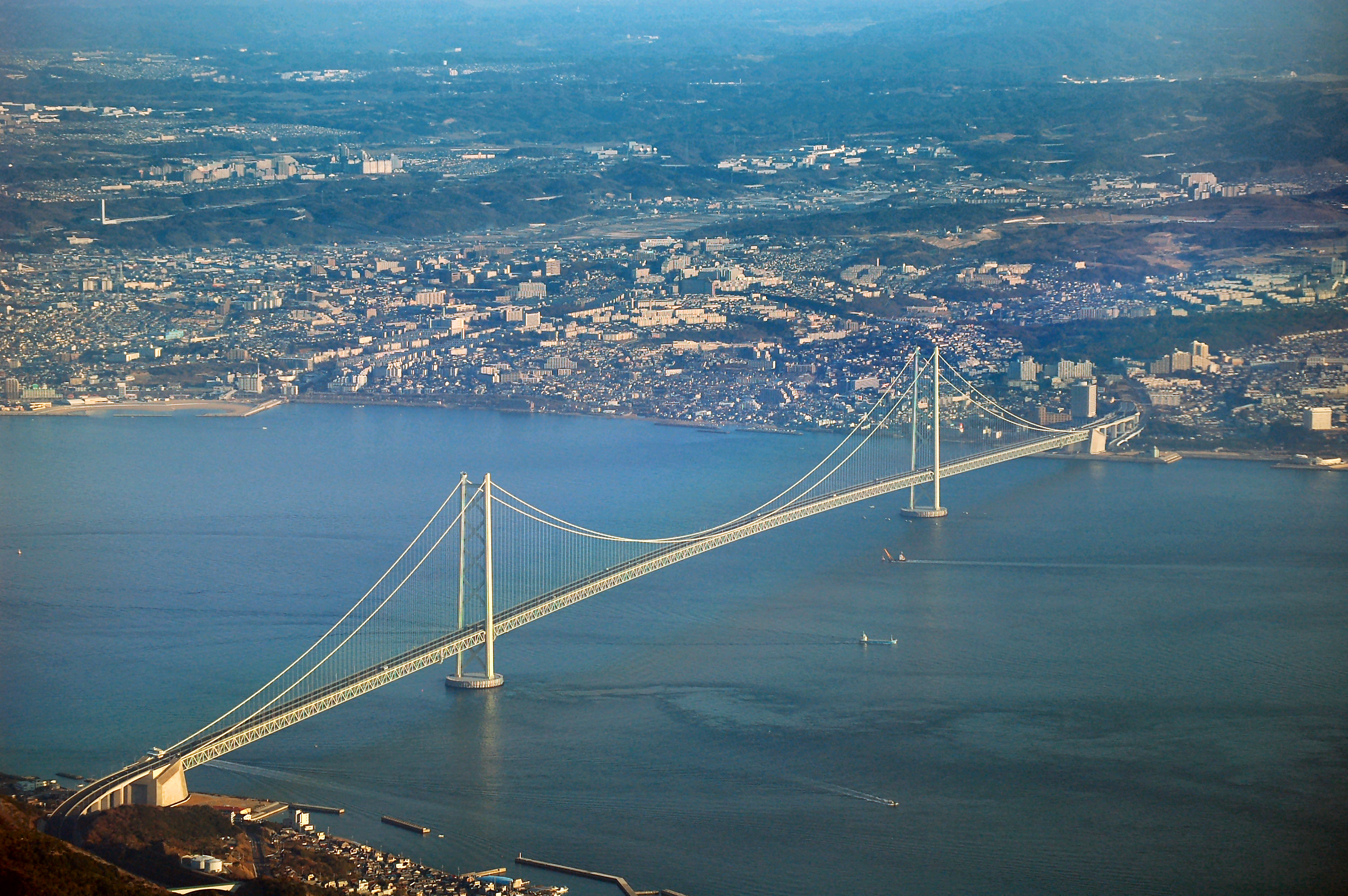
Akashi Kaikyo Bridge

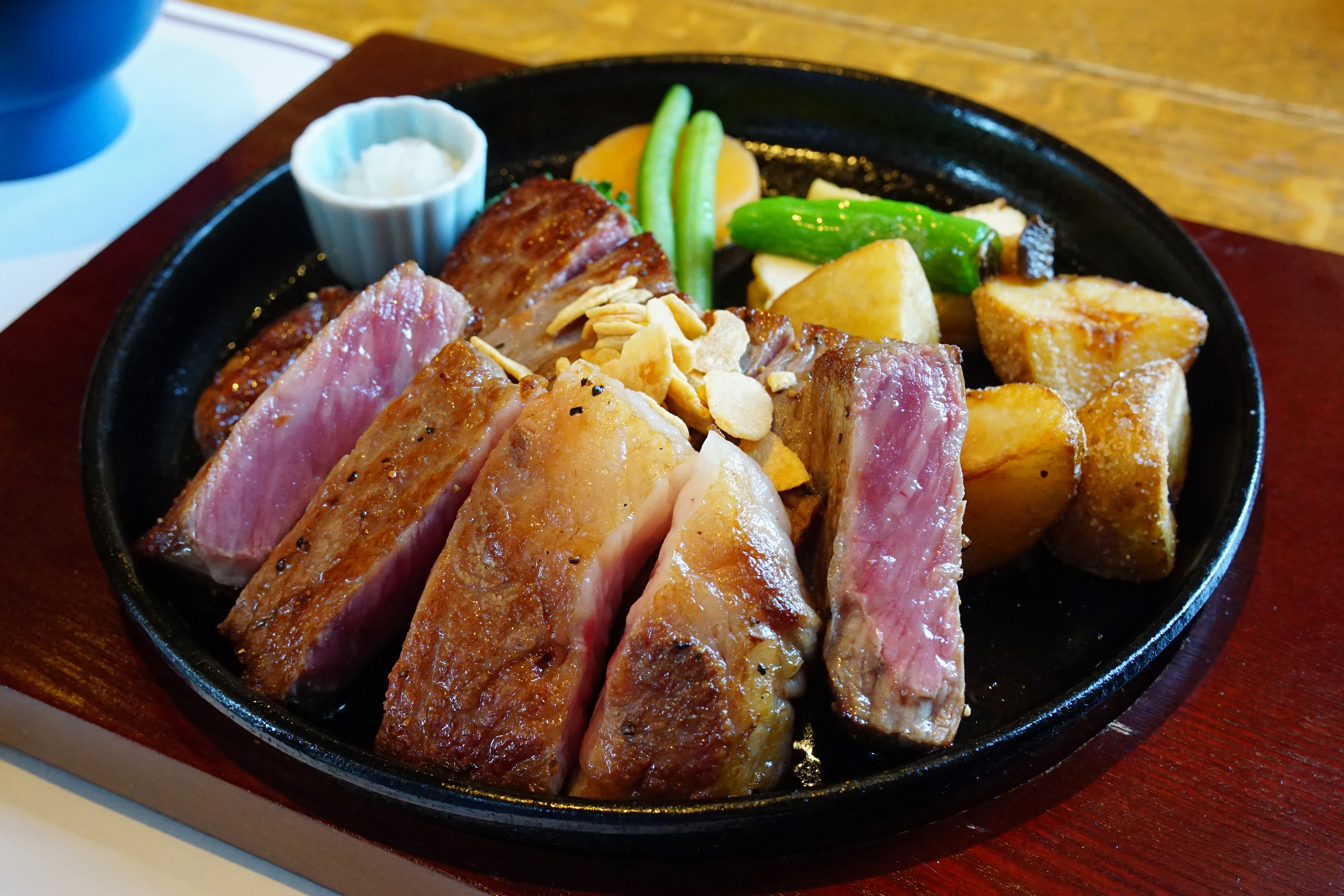
Awaji beef, a type of wagyu beef

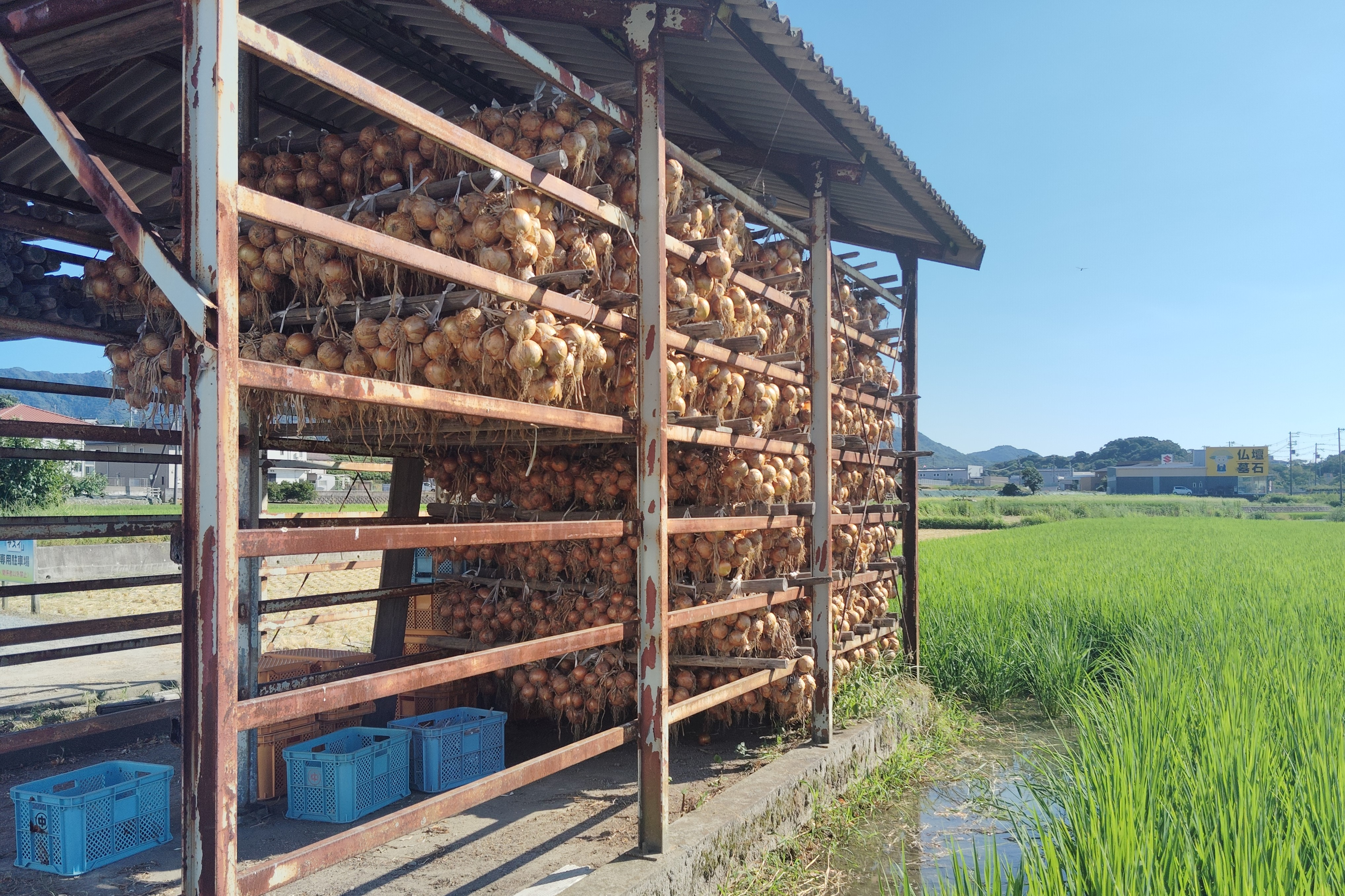
Awaji onions, a local specialty

== See also ==
- Thirteen Buddhas of Awaji Island
