= Akashi Strait =

Waterway between the Japanese islands of Honshu and Awaji

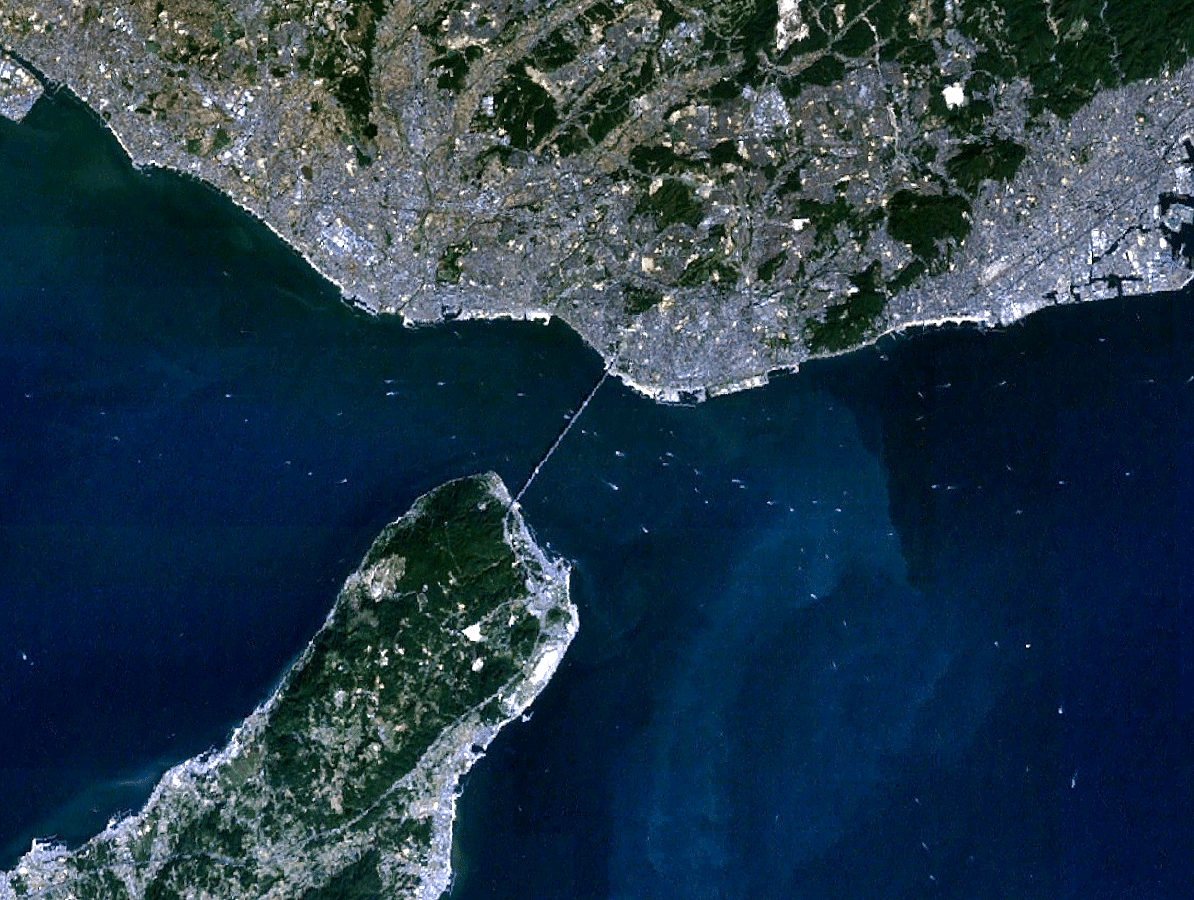
- Aerial view of the Akashi Strait; center of the image is its namesake bridge connecting the islands of Honshu and Awaji.

- Location of the Akashi Strait in Japan Akashi Strait (Japan)
- Coordinates: 34°37′N 134°59′E
- Basin countries: Japan
- Max. length: 1.5 km (0.93 mi)
- Max. width: 4 km (2.5 mi)
- Max. depth: 110 m (360 ft)

The Akashi Strait (明石海峡, Akashi Kaikyō) is a strait between the Japanese islands of Honshu and Awaji. The strait connects Seto Inland Sea and Osaka Bay. The width of the Akashi Strait is approximately 4 kilometers, and maximum depth is about 110 meters. The fastest tidal current is about 4.5 metres per second (8.7 knots).

The 1.5-kilometer strait is one of the important points of the Seto Inland Sea and is at the mouth of the Pacific Ocean. The surrounding waters around Akashi Strait is a known fishery area. The Akashi Strait is designated as an international shipping channel by the Maritime Traffic Safety Act in Japan.

The Akashi Kaikyō Bridge, an almost four-kilometer-long suspension bridge, crosses the strait. It links the city of Kobe (the capital of Hyōgo Prefecture) on Honshu Island to Iwaya on Awaji Island (also within Hyōgo Prefecture). Its longest span measures nearly two kilometers. After 10 years of construction it was finally opened to traffic on 5 April 1998. At the time of its opening in 1998, it was the world's longest suspension bridge.

The Great Hanshin Earthquake occurred beneath the Akashi Strait and struck on 17 January 1995 with magnitude 7.2. The Nojima Fault, which cuts across Awaji Island, is responsible; a surface trace about 10 kilometers long appeared on the island due to the earthquake. The Nojima Fault is a branch of the Japan Median Tectonic Line which runs the length of the southern half of Honshu.

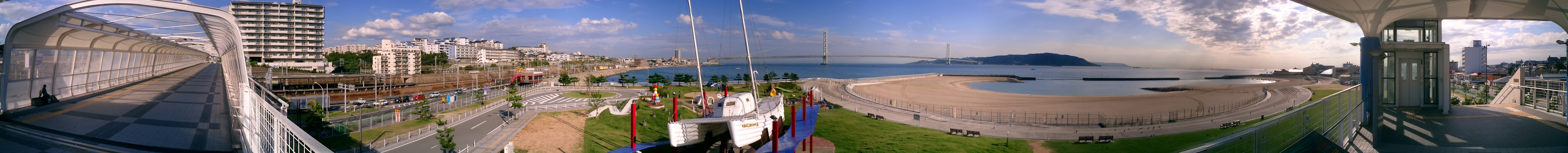
Panoramic view of the Akashi Strait.
