= 1586 Tenshō earthquake =

Earthquake in Japan

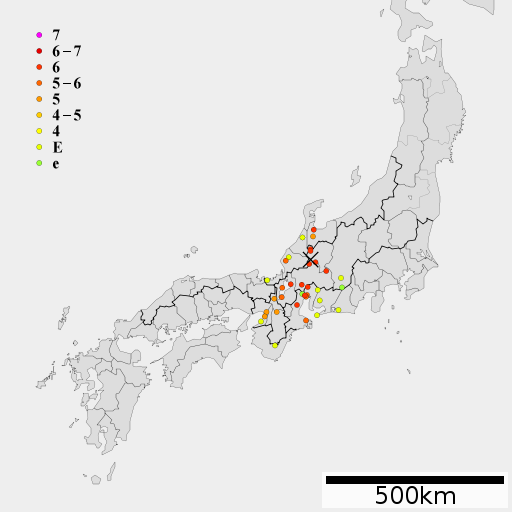
- Local date: January 18, 1586
- Local time: 23:00 JST
- Magnitude: 7.9 M_{JMA}
- Epicenter: 36.0°N 136.9°E
- Areas affected: Chūbu region, Japan
- Max. intensity: JMA 7
- Tsunami: 5 m (16 ft)
- Casualties: 8,000 dead (est.)

The Tenshō earthquake (Japanese: 天正地震, Hepburn: Tenshō Jishin) occurred in Japan on January 18, 1586, at 23:00 local time. This earthquake had an estimated seismic magnitude (M_{JMA}) of 7.9, and an epicenter in Honshu's Chūbu region. It caused an estimated 8,000 fatalities and damaged 10,000 houses across the prefectures of Toyama, Hyōgo, Kyōto, Osaka, Nara, Mie, Aichi, Gifu, Fukui, Ishikawa and Shizuoka. Historical documentation of this earthquake was limited because it occurred during the tumultuous Sengoku period.

== Tectonic setting ==
The island of Honshu is situated in a region of complex plate convergence between the Pacific, Amurian, Philippine Sea and Okhotsk plates. While a large component of the convergence is accommodated by subduction along the Nankai and Japan Trenches, shallow intraplate deformation occur as well. The Japan Median Tectonic Line and Itoigawa-Shizuoka Tectonic Line are two major fault zones that accommodate this deformation. These faults are associated with strike-slip and dip-slip faulting.

== Earthquake ==
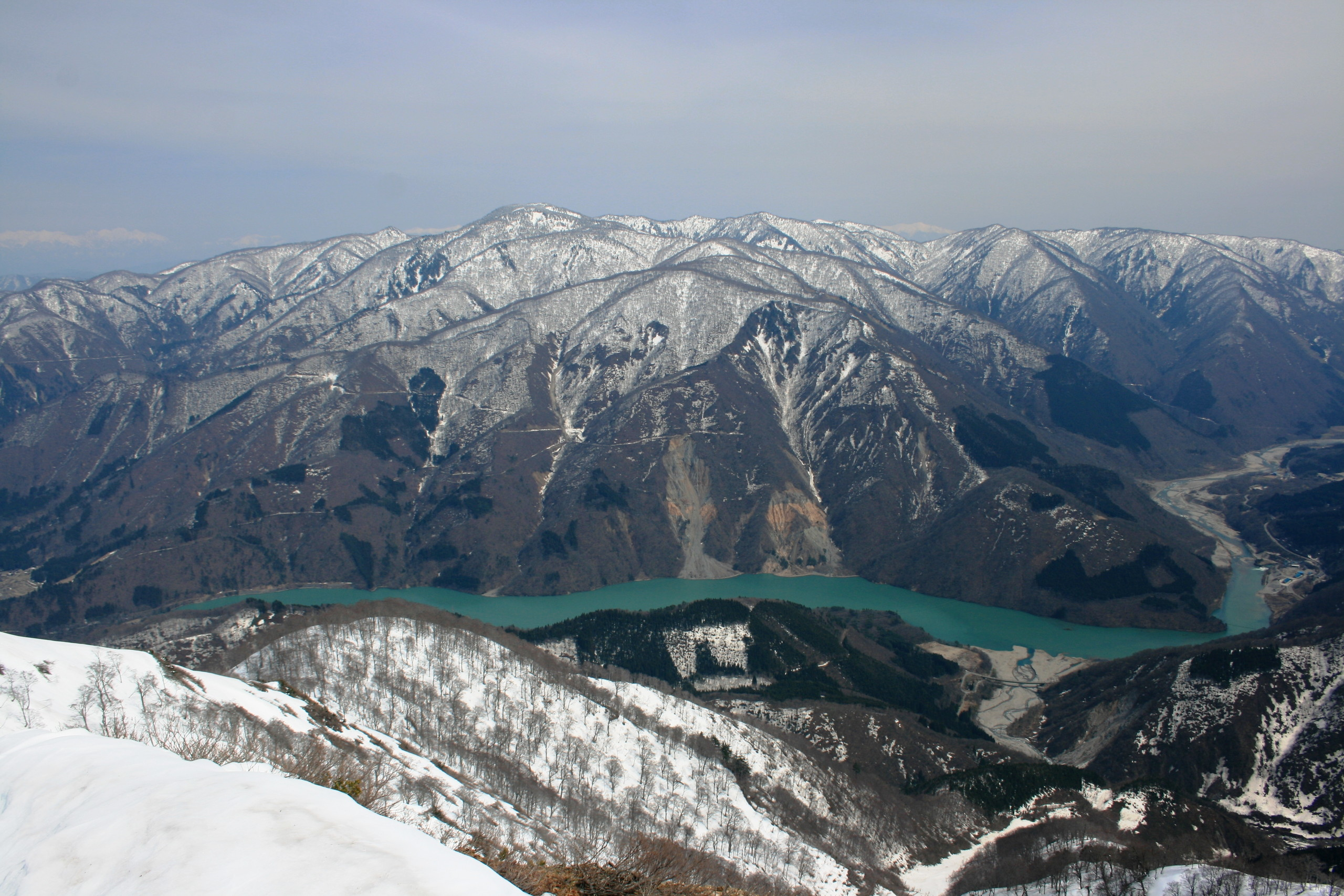
Landslide scars visible on Mount Sarugabanba.

The origin of the Tenshō earthquake is not known, but geologists have presented different faults to be the possible source. There is still debate about which fault zone caused the earthquake and even how the earthquake unfolded, through a single fault system rupture or even a multiple fault system rupture, given the massive death and destruction across wide areas of the Tōkai, Kinki, and Hokuriku regions. An analysis of the meizoseismal area suggests2 the source area was approximately 180 km × 60 km (112 mi × 37 mi) extending north-northeast–south-southwest from Wakasa Bay to Ise Bay. The same region was also the source area of the 1891 Mino–Owari earthquake.

=== Geology ===
The Atera Fault System that runs through the Chūbu region is a north-northeast–south-southwest-striking left-lateral fault with a length of 60–70 km (37–43 mi) that ruptured during the event. Present data suggest seismicity on the fault is low, with long recurrence intervals between major earthquakes of ~1,800 years. Soil surveys have found evidence that the fault ruptured in 1586. The forested area in the region showed evidence of en-echelon fractures. A nearby sag pond is also thought to have formed from the earthquake that has now been converted into a paddy field. Paleoseismic trenching and radiocarbon dating revealed that the last seismic event on the fault occurred between 1400 and 1600. This date corresponded to the 1586 earthquake as no other reports of a severe earthquake in the region occurred at around this time. Further surveys revealed that another structure, the Miboro Fault, a northwest strand of the Atera Fault was also involved in the earthquake, bringing the estimated rupture length to 85 km (53 mi). The suggested epicenter is located near the northwest part of Gifu Prefecture, based on analyzing the damage distribution.

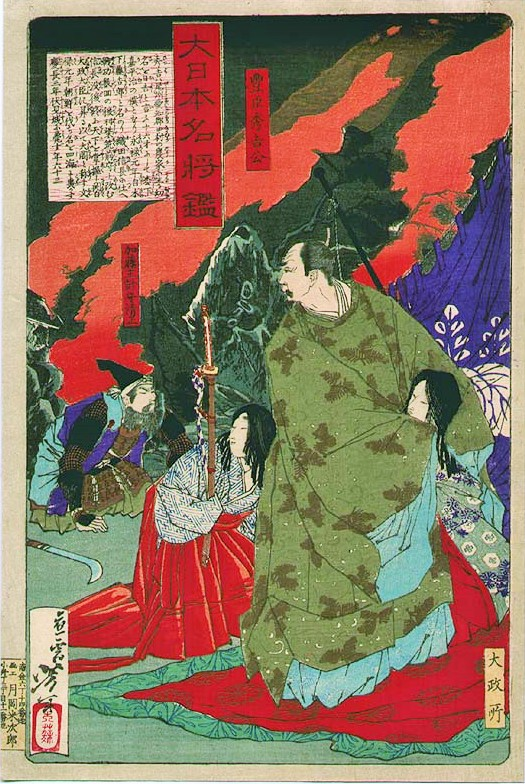
An 1879 woodblock print in Yoshitoshi's Mirror of Famous Generals of Great Japan depicting Toyotomi Hideyoshi being rescued by Katō Kiyomasa during the 1596 earthquake.

Additional surveys and drilling found that the Yōrō-Kuwana-Yokkaichi Fault Zone to the west of the Nōbi Plain may have also ruptured, and corresponds to reports of severe damage in the vicinity. There is also evidence that the last earthquake on that fault zone could have happened between the 13th and 16th century, and it hence corresponds to the time of the earthquake (1586). The Yōrō-Kuwana-Yokkaichi Fault Zone is a group of three reverse faults beneath the Nōbi Plain with a total length of 55 km (34 mi). Evidence of faults was further supported by the presence of vertical displacements reflected in the sedimentary layers of the plain. The fault zone was also responsible for an earthquake in 745 AD (ja), and ten additional events within the past 6,000 years. The blind Yōrō Fault located along the eastern base of the Yōrō Mountains was also identified as a source of the quake. Fold scarps measuring up to 2 m (6 ft 7 in) high formed during the event was discovered to have extended 60 km (37 mi) in length.

The disappearance of islands at the mouth of the Kiso River in Ise Bay was attributed to liquefaction and tsunami, caused by slip on the Ise Bay and Ise Bay Mouth Faults, located undersea.

=== Foreshocks and aftershocks ===
A foreshock occurred on November 27, 1585, and is thought to have triggered the mainshock two months later. The foreshock had an estimated magnitude of 6.6. The earthquake caused aftershocks that were felt in Kyoto every day for two months. Two strong earthquakes rocked the region in 1589 and 1596 (ja), but were less destructive. The latter event had a magnitude of 7.5 and resulted in at least 1,100 fatalities in Kyoto and Sakai.

== Tsunami ==
A tsunami was reported in Lake Biwa, Wakasa Bay and Ise Bay, however these may have been seiches as the rupture did not extend offshore. The tsunami had a run-up height of 3 m (9.8 ft) in Ise Bay, while at Wakasa Bay, it was estimated to be 4–5 m (13–16 ft).

A wave was reported along the coast of Lake Biwa, slamming into homes and washing away many residents in Nagahama. The wave destroyed much of the city and flooded Nagahama Castle. There were over 8,000 fatalities in Ise Bay due to the tsunami. Multiple fatalities was recorded in Toyama Bay and along the Shō River. Analysis of sedimentary layers at Lake Suigetsu found no evidence of seawater entering the lake. A 2015 study found tsunami deposits in a paddy field in Ōi District, Fukui Prefecture dating to between the 14th and 16th centuries which corresponds to the event.

Records of the tsunami are sparse and it was misattributed to a destructive wave along the Sanriku coast in a tsunami catalog in 1586. The 1586 Sanriku tsunami is regarded as a false event as there are no historical documentation of such an event in 1586. The tsunami was also misattributed to a Peruvian earthquake the same year. Historical records support the occurrence of a tsunami along the Sanriku coast in June 1585, which has been attributed to a large earthquake in the Aleutian Islands.

== Damage ==
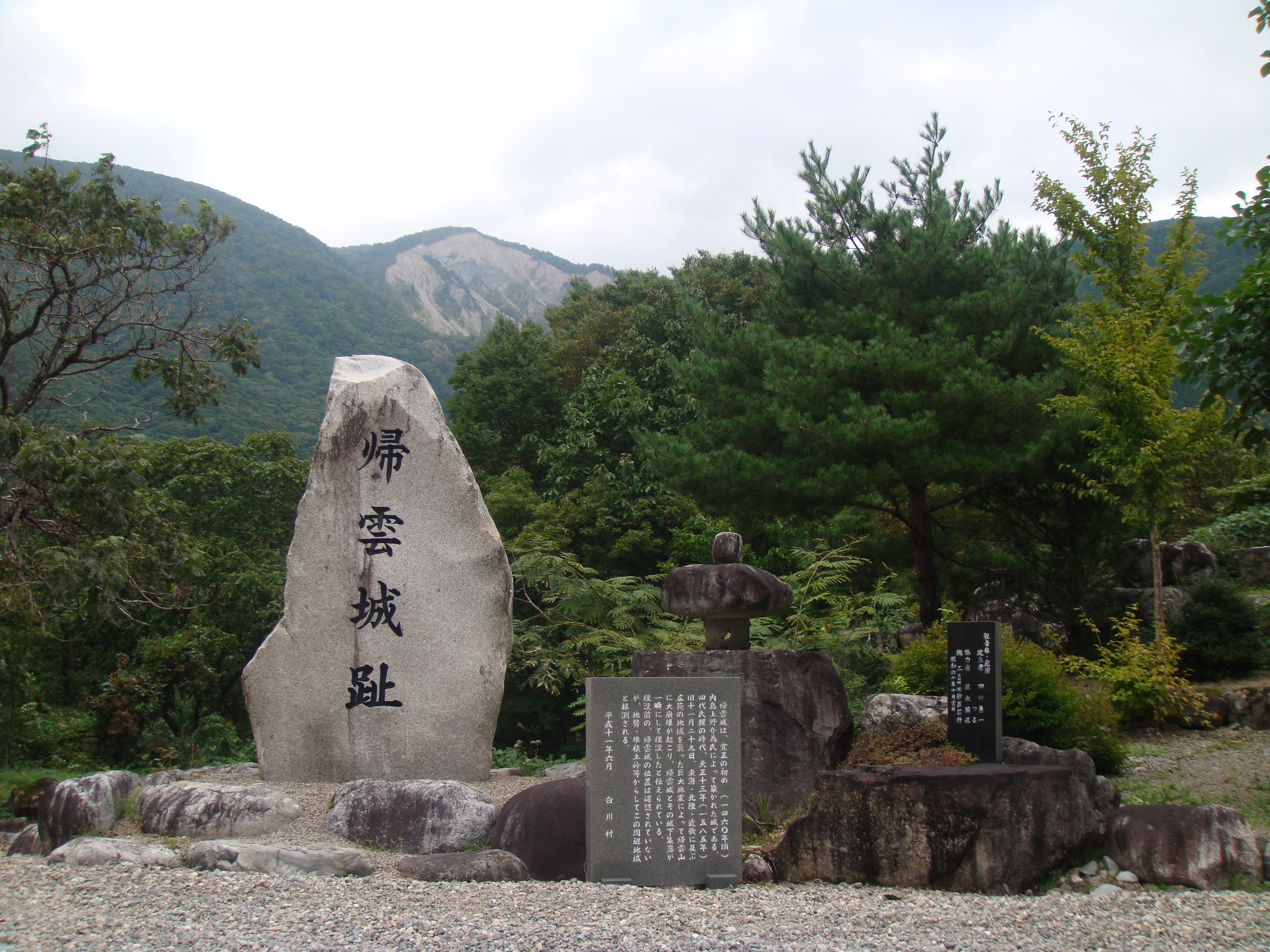
A monument to Kaerikumo Castle, buried by an earthquake-triggered landslide. The landslide scar is visible in the background.

The earthquake had a maximum JMA intensity of Shindo 6–7 extending from the Noto Peninsula to Lake Biwa. Extreme damage was reported between Nara, Osaka, Toyama and Shizuoka. Large conflagrations broke out as a result. Large-scale landslides occurred in the northern part of the damage zone which was dominated by mountains. A fortress was completely wiped out by one of these landslides, while another collapsed during the tremors. A triggered landslide on Kaerikumoyama buried the Kaerikumo Castle and 300 houses, killing 500 people. The Ōgaki Castle was destroyed by a fire. The only daughter of Yamauchi Kazutoyo was killed in Nagahama.

There were reports that a few small islands in the Kiso River vanished as a result of soil liquefaction and subsequent subsidence which caused water to submerge the islands while a tsunami was generated in Ise Bay, drowning thousands. At the location of present-day Nagoya, extensive soil liquefaction took place. Sand volcanoes and dykes were recorded and discovered at locations in the plain. Significant destruction was reported in Kyoto, but its temples sustained minor damage. The Tō-ji temple in the city was seriously damaged and over 600 Buddha statues in Sanjūsangen-dō were destroyed. A Christian missionary in the region reported that 60 homes were destroyed at Sakai. Movement of faults and shaking severely deformed the Kiso Three Rivers, resulting in a drastic change in its course.

== Aftermath ==
At the time, Toyotomi Hideyoshi was preparing for war against Tokugawa Ieyasu, who refused to submit to his authority. However, Hideyoshi's stronghold and headquarter, Osaka, suffered immense damage due to the earthquake. In contrast, Ieyasu's base in Mikawa experienced relatively light damage. Hideyoshi prioritized the reconstruction of Osaka and shifted to a peace-oriented approach towards Ieyasu. Ieyasu narrowly escaped disaster and later became the number-two in the Toyotomi administration. After Hideyoshi's death, Ieyasu seized power and established the Tokugawa shogunate, which lasted for 260 years.

== See also ==
- List of earthquakes in Japan
- List of historical earthquakes
