= 1891 Mino–Owari earthquake =

Magnitude 8.0 earthquake in Japan

- 濃尾地震
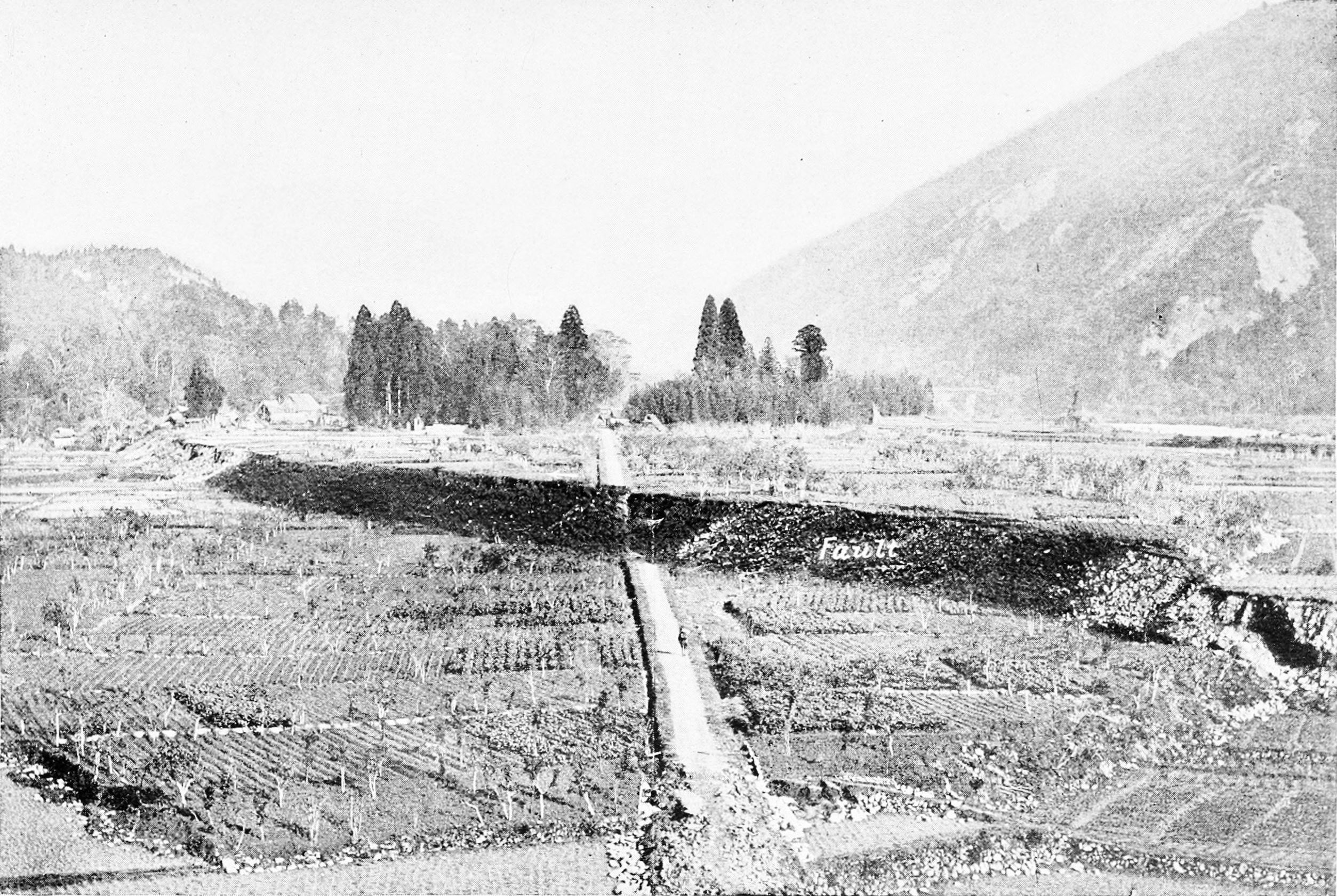
- Scarp at the Neodani Fault can be seen in the center of the picture

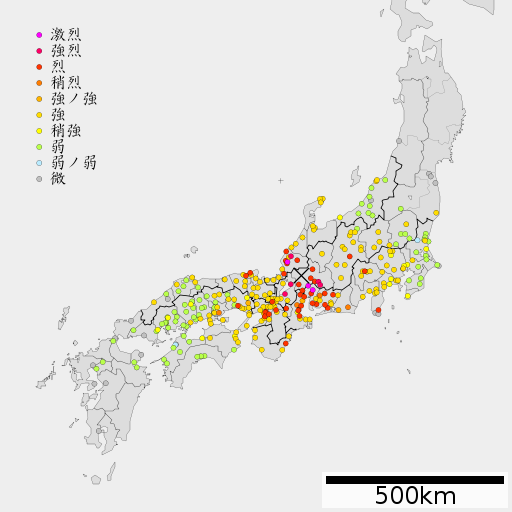

- Location within Japan
- UTC time: 1891-10-27 21:38
- Local date: October 28, 1891
- Local time: 06:38 (local)
- Magnitude: 8.0 M_{s} 7.5 M_{w}
- Depth: 10 km (6.2 mi)
- Epicenter: 35.6°N 136.6°E
- Type: Oblique-slip
- Areas affected: Mino Province; Owari Province
- Peak acceleration: 0.41 g 400 gal
- Landslides: ~ 10,000
- Casualties: 7,273 dead 17,175 injured

The 1891 Mino–Owari earthquake (美濃・尾張地震, Mino-Owari Jishin) struck the Japanese provinces of Mino and Owari (present-day Gifu Prefecture) in the Nōbi Plain in the early morning of October 28 with a surface-wave magnitude of 8.0 and moment magnitude of 7.5. The event, also referred to as the Nōbi earthquake (濃尾地震, Nōbi Jishin), the Great Gifu earthquake (岐阜大地震, Gifu Daijishin), or the Great Nōbi earthquake (濃尾大地震, Nōbi Daijishin), is the largest known inland earthquake to have occurred in the Japanese archipelago.

The earthquake came at a time when Japan was undergoing a transformation into a more industrial nation and while advancing its scientific understanding in many fields. Damage from the event was widespread and the loss of life was significant. The many kilometers of visible fault breaks on the surface of the Earth presented scientists with opportunities for field investigations that ultimately led to an improved understanding of the fault scarps that earthquakes often generate.

== Preface ==
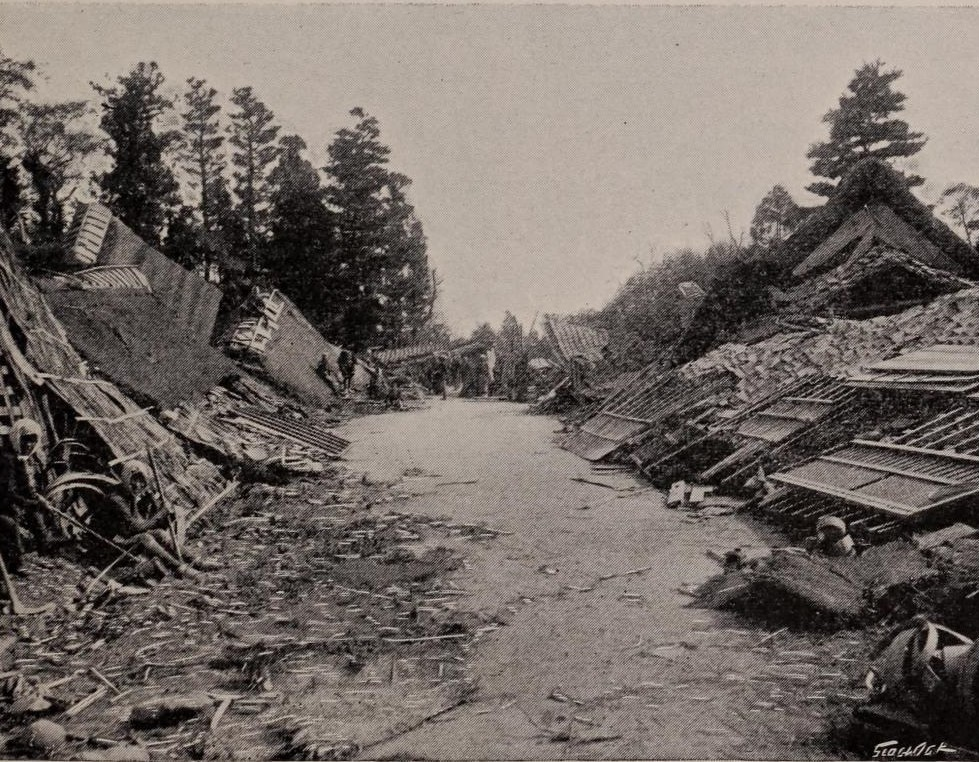
Damage caused by the earthquake

Records of historical earthquakes and tsunami extend further back in time in Japan than any other country that lies along the Pacific Rim (the first documented event occurred in 416 AD). These historical documents supported the date verification of the 1700 Cascadia earthquake that occurred off the Pacific Northwest coast of North America. The issue of earthquakes in Japan was made a priority following the 1854 Ansei-Nankai event that brought great destruction to the southwest portion of the country. With the onset of the Meiji period, the feudal government system was superseded by an empire that began to focus on advancing the Japanese society up to Western standards, especially in science.

While the government brought in foreign experts (yatoi) during the building of the country's modern infrastructure, the high seismicity in Japan proved to be an ideal laboratory setting during the establishment of the new science of seismology. In 1876, John Milne came from England to teach at the Imperial College of Engineering in Tokyo. Following the earthquake of February 22, 1880, Milne's attention turned to seismology as a primary area of study. That earthquake also triggered the formation of the Seismological Society of Japan, which was an organization to help foreign scientists stay coordinated in their efforts. Shortly thereafter, the Japanese had their own organization (the Japan Meteorological Agency) that had taken control of an earthquake reporting system that was initially created by Milne. Ultimately, the system and the 1891 earthquake provided data by which seismologist Fusakichi Omori developed a law of decay for aftershocks.

== Tectonic setting ==
The four main Japanese islands of Kyushu, Shikoku, Honshu, and Hokkaido lie in a convex arrangement pointing to the Pacific Ocean, while the oceanic trenches that form the western boundary of the Pacific plate are convex in the opposite direction, toward Eurasia. The continental crust above the subduction zones had previously been associated with the Eurasian plate, but northern Honshu and Hokkaido have more recently been treated as part of the North American plate, due to a poorly defined plate boundary between Eastern Siberia and Alaska and a newly forming boundary at the eastern perimeter of the Sea of Japan. This portion of the crust has been known locally as the Okhotsk microplate. The southwestern border of the plate is called the Itoigawa-Shizuoka Tectonic Line. It is a region of faulting that traverses the width of central Honshu, but it has not generated any large earthquakes. Moving westward, though, the Atera, Miboro, Atotsugawa, and Nobi faults have all produced large events. Two of those events occurred beyond the terminus of the 1891 rupture: the 1945 Mikawa earthquake that hit near Nagoya on the Fukozu Fault and the 1948 Fukui earthquake that occurred near the Sea of Japan.

== Earthquake ==
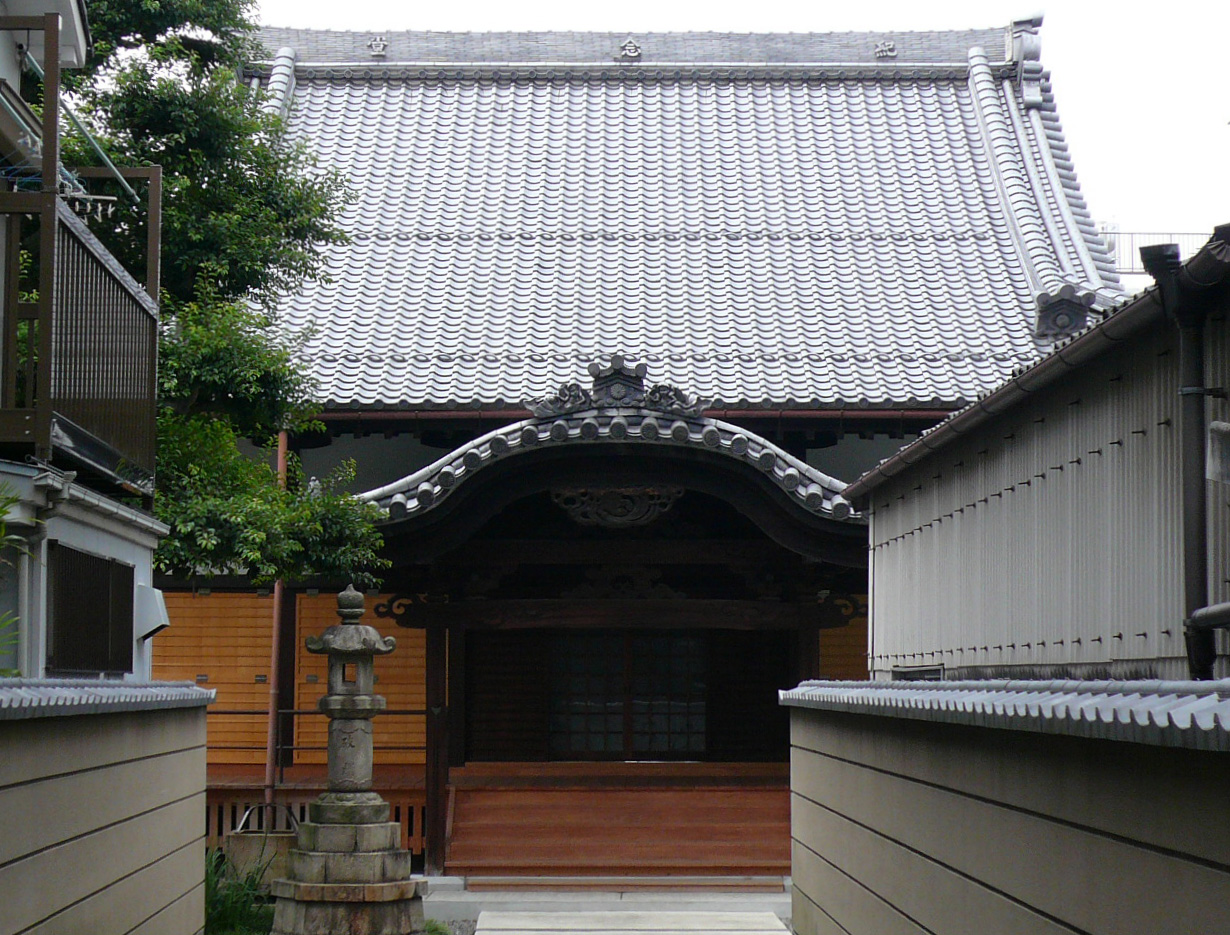
Gifu's Earthquake Memorial Hall is dedicated to the victims.

The October 1891 event was the largest recorded inland earthquake in Japan's history. Surface faulting stretched 80 kilometers (50 mi) with horizontal displacement up to 8 meters (26 ft) and vertical slip in the range of 2–3 m (6 ft 7 in – 9 ft 10 in). In that era, scientists believed that large shallow earthquakes were the result of magma moving underground or even subterranean explosions. Bunjiro Koto, a professor at Tokyo Imperial University, was so influenced by the extraordinary surface faulting that he diverged from the traditional belief and proclaimed that sudden fault slip had been the cause and not simply a secondary consequence of the event.

The earthquake was recorded on Gray-Milne-Ewing seismographs at weather observation stations at Gifu, Nagoya, Osaka, and Tokyo as well as a station housed at Tokyo Imperial University. Although the units went off scale after 8.5 seconds at Gifu and 13.5 seconds at Nagoya (probably due to an inundation of large S waves) the seismograms they produced have been beneficial for seismologists to develop an understanding of the fault rupture process. The records from the stations at Gifu and Nagoya were especially useful as they were the closest to the fault zone.

=== Surface faulting ===
Within the first several decades of the event, Koto and Omori documented the comprehensive fault breaks that were visible on the surface, and a later investigation by T. Matsuda revealed that the breaks followed a general northwest–southeast trend. Matsuda's 1974 survey also documented intermittent and complementary conjugate faults that were aligned northeast–southwest and labeled the arrangement the Nobi fault system. The strike-slip breaks were described as primarily left-lateral offset of three major faults. The surface rupture did not extend over the full distance of the individual faults, but the Nukumi segment ran 20 km (12 mi) with a maximum offset of 3 m (9.8 ft). The Neodani and Umehara faults had rupture lengths of 35 km (22 mi) and 25 km (16 mi) and maximum offsets of 8 m (26 ft) and 5 m (16 ft) respectively.

=== Damage ===
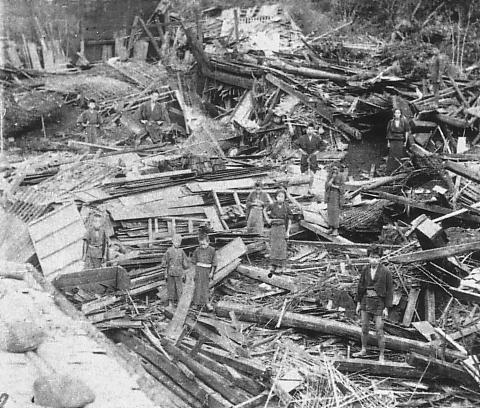
Damage from the Nōbi earthquake

The shock occurred near Nagoya, and was felt throughout the country, but was the strongest in central Japan. The cities of Gifu and Ogaki experienced heavy damage, due largely to fire, but Osaka and Nagoya were also significantly affected. The earthquake was strong in Tokyo, lasting for many minutes, and knocked items off shelves and stopped clocks.

The initial report of the disaster in Tokyo's Asahi Shimbun gave only limited details. It stated that a new building for the Home Ministry in Tokyo lost several chimneys and that the reason for the loss of power in Yokohama was that a brick chimney had fallen at the power plant and had damaged equipment there. The following day though, the paper revealed that many homes had been lost and other industrial buildings were damaged or destroyed in Osaka, including the Naniwa cotton textile mill, a new western-style three-story brick building. On November 3, as the extent of the damage was becoming clearer, the same paper reported that more than 1,000 Japanese homes and other buildings had collapsed in Nagoya.

=== Aftershocks ===
More than 3,000 aftershocks were reported by the Gifu weather observatory in the 14 months following the event. According to a 1976 study by Takeshi Mikumo and Masataka Ando, three or four shocks per year were still being detected. Several university studies of the microearthquake activity were undertaken in the 1960s and 1970s and the areas southwest of the Neodani fault and near Gifu and Inuyama were found to be experiencing elevated activity.

== See also ==
- List of earthquakes in Japan
- List of historical earthquakes
- 1586 Tenshō earthquake – A similar event occurring in the same region
