= Bunjiro Koto =

Japanese geologist

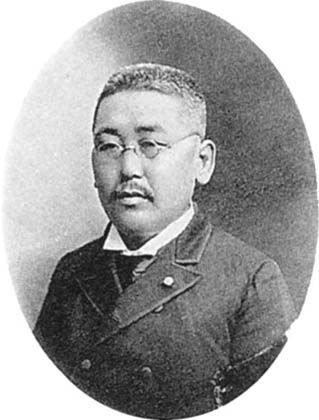
Bunjiro Koto

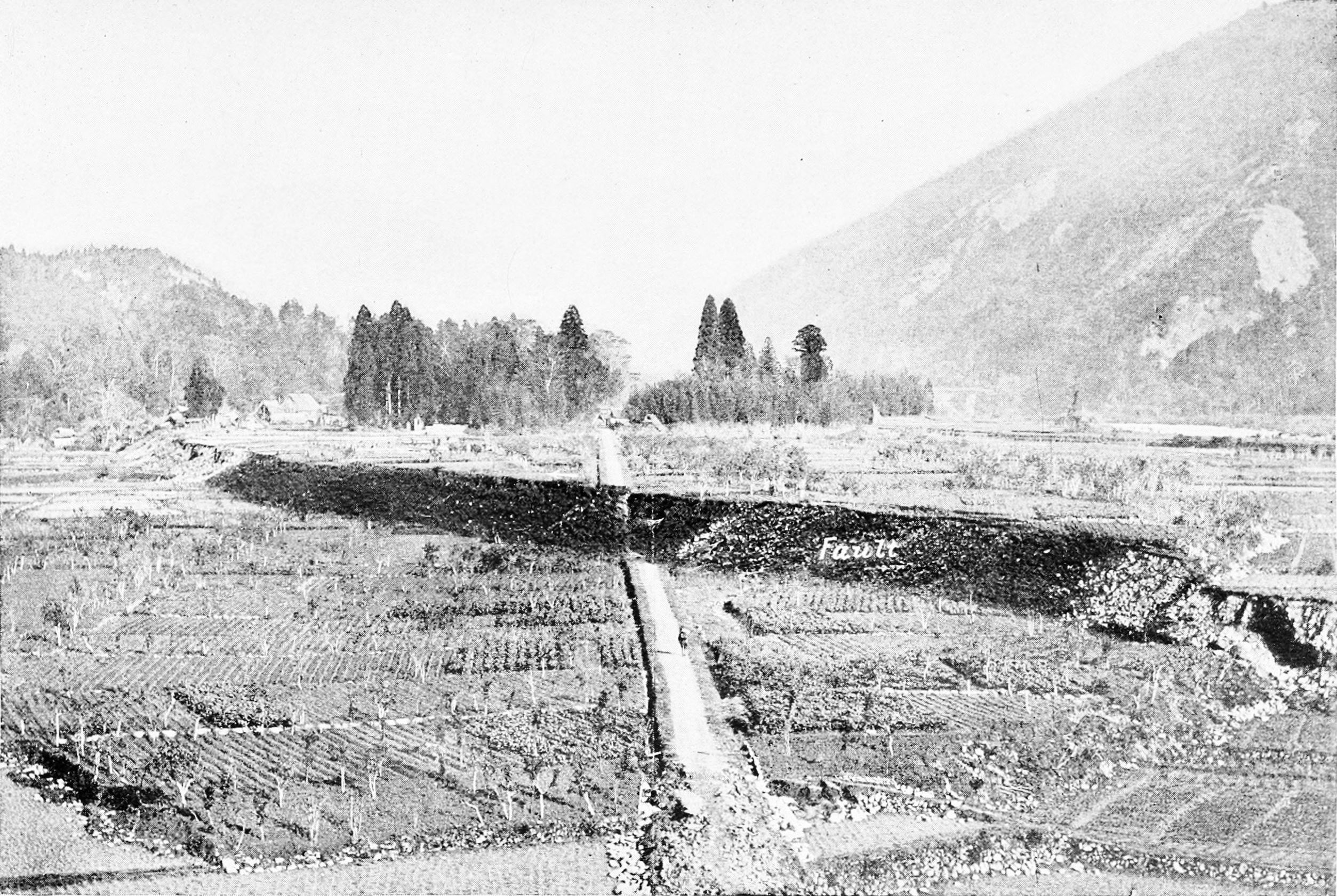
Neodani Fault (This is a photo taken by Bunjiro Koto)

Bunjirō Kotō (Japanese: 小藤 文次郎, April 8, 1856 - March 8, 1935) was a Japanese earth scientist (Geologist). He is from Iwami Province (Shimane Prefecture). Kotō is from Tokyo Imperial University, and after graduating, he became a professor at Tokyo Imperial University. He is known for taking photographs of the Neodani Fault when he investigated the 1891 Mino–Owari earthquake.

== See also ==
- Kotoite (小藤石)
- 1891 Mino–Owari earthquake (Neodani Fault)
