= Kaerikumo Castle =

Coordinates: 36.2100°N 136.8927°E

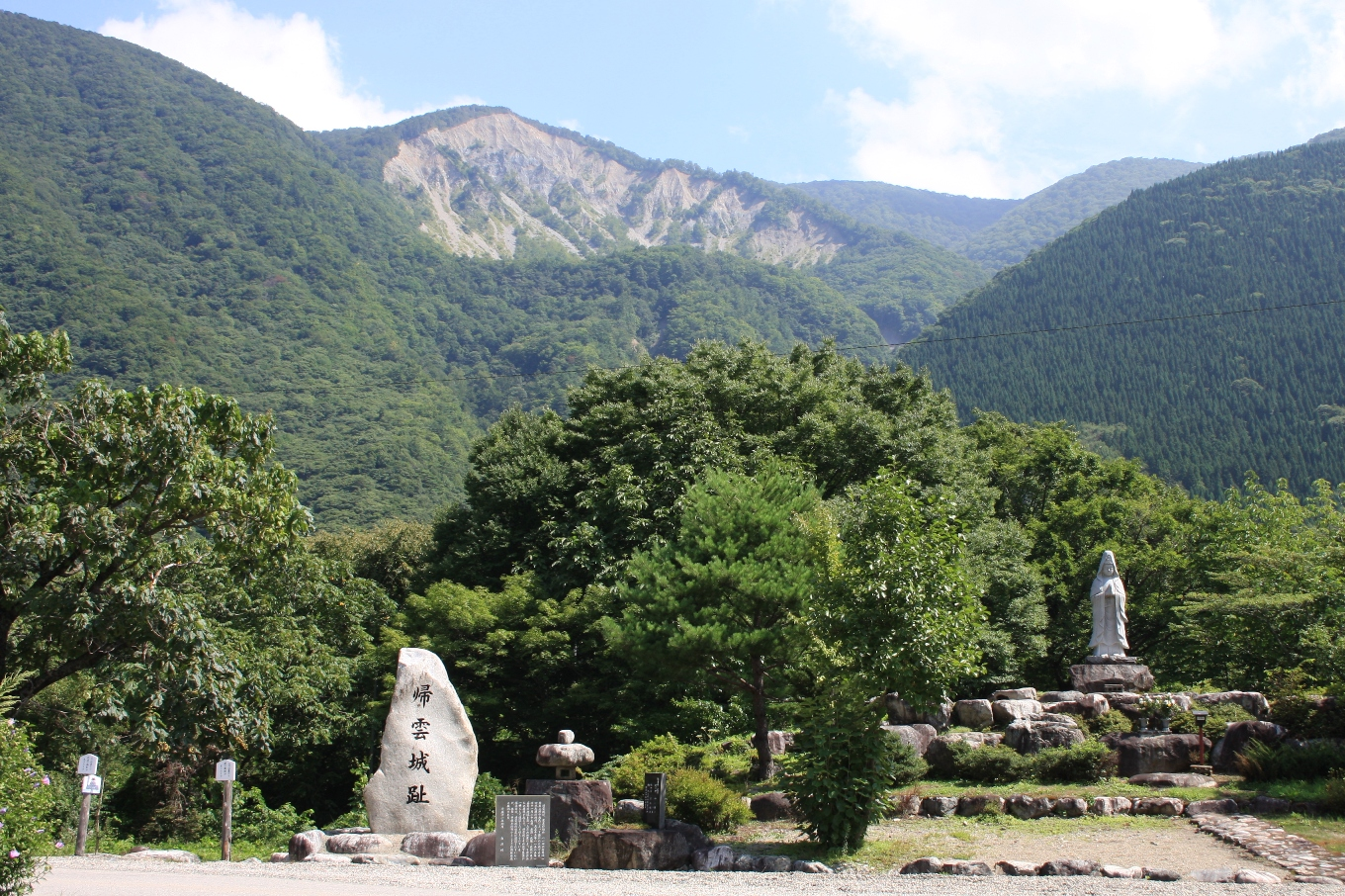
Mt. Sampōkuzure (one of the mountain candidates identified as Mt. Kaerikumo) and the memorial monuments, built on what is believed to be the site of Kaerikumo Castle.

Kaerikumo Castle (Japanese: 帰雲城, Hepburn: Kaerikumo-jō / Kaerigumo-jō / Kiun-jō; lit. 'Castle Clouds Back') is a castle that is said to have existed in Shirakawa Village in the Hida region, Japan, being served as the castle of the Uchigashima clan, from the end of the Muromachi period to the end of the Azuchi–Momoyama period. It is well known a castle that was buried overnight by 1586 Tenshō earthquake. The exact location of this castle is unknown.

== Historical materials ==
According to Binkōki (『岷江記』, Binkōki / Minkōki) and other historical sources, Kaerikumo Castle is said to have actually existed in Shirakawa village. Binkōki is a hagiograph that tells the history of Hida Shōren-ji Temple (飛騨照蓮寺) from its founder Zenshun (善俊) (Note: A grandchild of Go-Toba-In.) to the expansion of the temple's influence throughout Hida region, and was written in the eighteenth century. Therefore, it is not a contemporary historical source, and the description of those who opposed the temple is one-sided. In Binkōki, the descriptions of successive temple presidents, who leaded Hida Ikkō Ikki sect, are written with the intention of glorifying and praising them, and especially, Myōshin, one of them, are celebrated.

Regarding the castle's history before the earthquake, there are no contemporary historical records, and the only available information is the vague information described in Binkōki. Several contemporary historical sources including Diary of Uno Mondo and Kyōmonbō documents, indicate that the castle was damaged by an earthquake. However, estimating the extent of the damage is difficult.

== History ==
Kaerikumo Castle served as the castle of three generations and four castle lords of the Uchigashima clan, the family conquered the most mountainous north-west part of Hida Province for 120 years from the end of the Muromachi period to the end of the Azuchi-Momoyama period. The first generation and the first lord Shōkan Tameuji of Uchigashima received orders from Ashikaga Yoshimasa, the 8th Shogun of the Muromachi Shogunate, to conquer Shirakawa and built a castle at Makito (located north of now Miboro Dam) in 1460. He then went north and built another castle. This was Kaerikumo Castle.

Tameuji, using Kaerikumo Castle as his base, expanded his army and brought the west half of Hida and the southern part of Etchū under his control. Tameuji and his son, Kōzuke-no-suke Masauji, fought against Shōren-ji Temple, Hida Ikkō Ikki force. Tameuji was in conflict with Shōren-ji's leaders, brothers Shōren-ji Kyōshin and Akinori, and killed the latter. Akinori's son, Kijumaru, fled to Eiheiji Temple with his mother and grew up there.

In 1501, Kijumaru, now 15 years old, came to the castle every day to avenge the deaths of his father and uncle, and asked to meet with Tameuji, but Tameuji refused. According to a folk song passed down in Shirakawa village, Kijumaru was a fascinating man. The details are unknown, but later married Tameuji's granddaughter and, with Hongan-ji Temple's mediation, Kijumaru and Tameuji were reconciled. Kijumaru and Tameuji's granddaughter re-established Shōren-ji Temple. However, since there is no other evidence other than Binkōki regarding the circumstances surrounding the revival of Shōren-ji Temple, it is difficult to know what actually happened.

== Buried by Earthquake ==
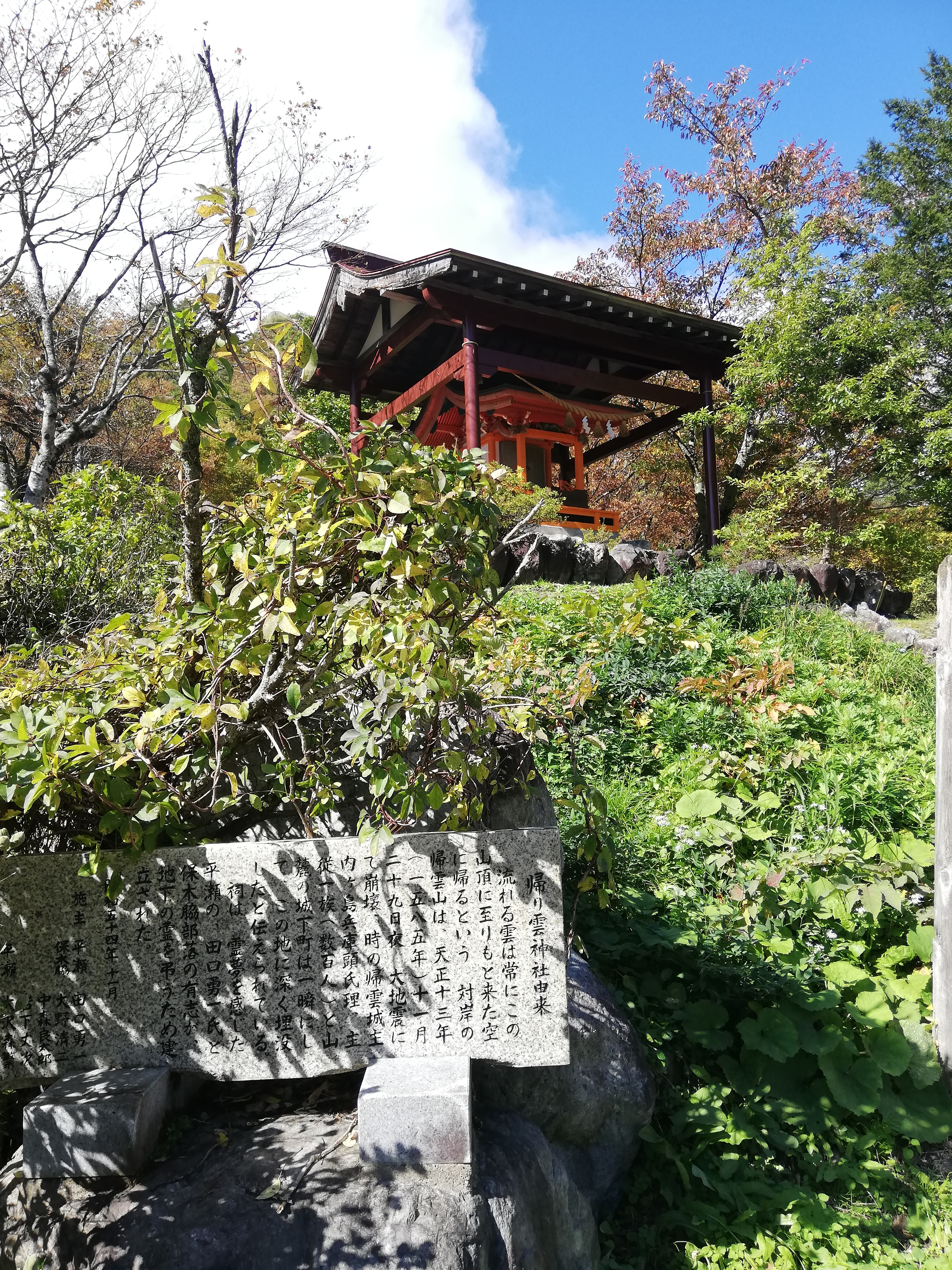
Kaerikumo shrine, built on what is believed to be the site of Kaerikumo Castle.

At around 11:00 p.m. on November 29, 13rd year of Tenshō (January 18, 1586 in the Gregorian calendar), a massive earthquake struck a wide area in the regions of Tōkai, Hokuriku, and Kinki. This earthquake is now called 1586 Tenshō earthquake or Hakusan huge earthquake. The earthquake caused a massive collapse of one or more mountain(s) on the right (or left) bank of the Shogawa River.

According to Binkōki, Diary of Uno Mondo, Kyōmonbō documents and other historical sources, Kaerikumo Castle and its castle town were buried by a landslide caused by the mountain collapse. The castle and 300 houses were buried under the rubble, and an estimated from 1,200 to 1,500 and more people, including all but four members of the clan, as well as all their cattle and horses, were killed. On the day the earthquake occurred, a celebration was being held to celebrate Hashiba Hideyoshi's confirmation of the clan's territory, and almost all of Uchigashima clan members were present in the castle.

== Aftermath ==
The tragedy of Kaerikumo Castle, in which the entire clan and retainers were wiped out overnight, was told to others by four people who happened to be in other countries at the time for business or other reason. One of the four was Kyōmonbō, who was a Buddhist monk and the younger brother of the last castle lord, Uchigashima Ujimasa. Kyōmonbō later left behind documents relating to this earthquake.

The exact location of the castle is still unknown. There are two main reasons for this: firstly, excavation surveys are difficult and, secondly, the place names recorded in the historical documents differ from the current names. The mountain now called Sampōkuzure seems to be called Kaerikumo at the time. The collapse of part of this mountain formed what is now called Mt. Kaerikumo. The area, which was called Kaerikumo in the Middle Ages, came to be called Hokiwaki in the Edo period, a name that has been passed down to the present day. Hokiwaki means "near the cliff". This indicates that the topography of the area was completely changed by the earthquake.

There was a gold mine in Uchigashima clan's territory, so there is a legend that gold bars are buried on the site of Kaerikumo Castle. However, this is not based on the traditions of Shirakawa village, but was clearly fabricated by a man in Osaka in the 1970s.
