= 1896 Rikuu earthquake =

Earthquake in Japan

- 陸羽地震
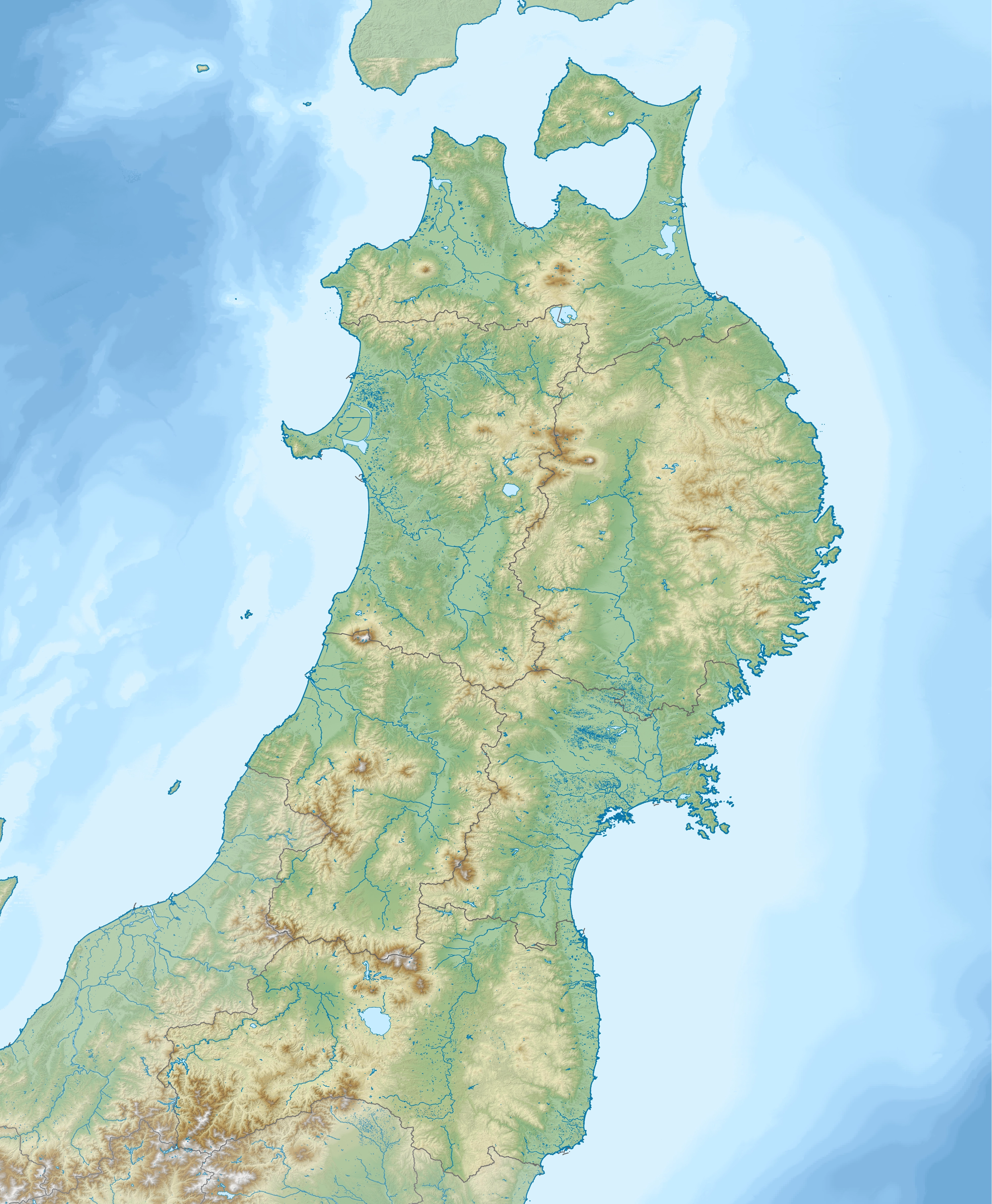
- Location within Japan Location within Tohoku, Japan
- UTC time: 1896-08-31 08:06
- Local date: August 31, 1896
- Local time: 17:06
- Magnitude: M7.2
- Epicenter: 39.5°N 140.7°E
- Fault: Senya Fault
- Casualties: 209 dead, 779 injured

The 1896 Rikuu earthquake (Japanese: 陸羽地震) is an inland earthquake that occurred on August 31, 1896, near the border between Akita and Iwate prefectures, Japan. Magnitude was 7.2. The earthquake left 209 people dead (205 people dead in Akita Prefecture) and 779 people injured. Senya Fault, part of the Yokota Basin Eastern Margin Fault Zone is the fault which was responsible for 1896 Rikuu earthquake, along with surface rupture.

== See also ==
- Senya Fault
