= Shirakawa Village =

Historic village in Gifu prefecture, Japan

Coordinates: 36°15′27″N 136°54′24″E

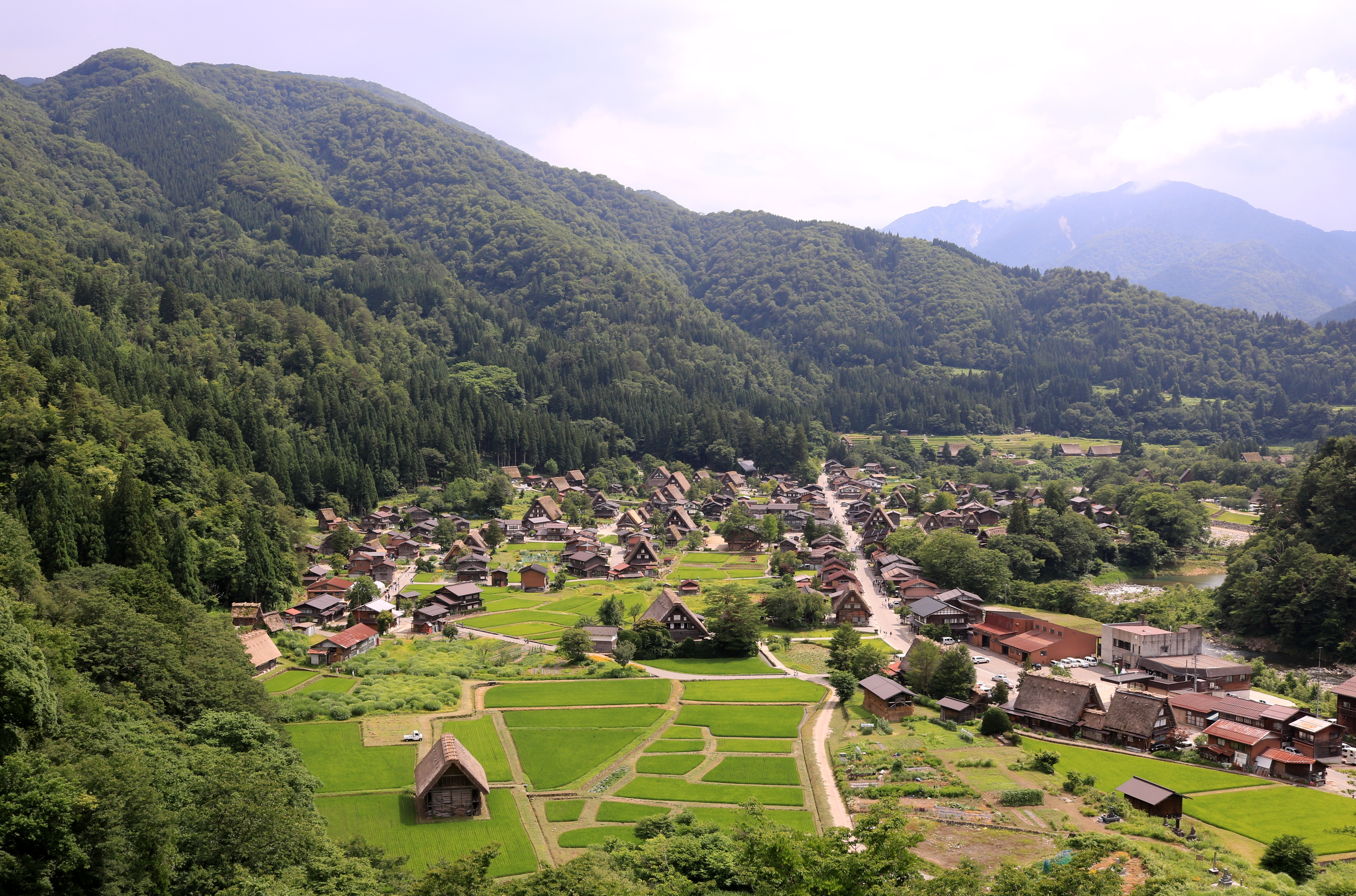
Panoramic view of the Ogimachi area

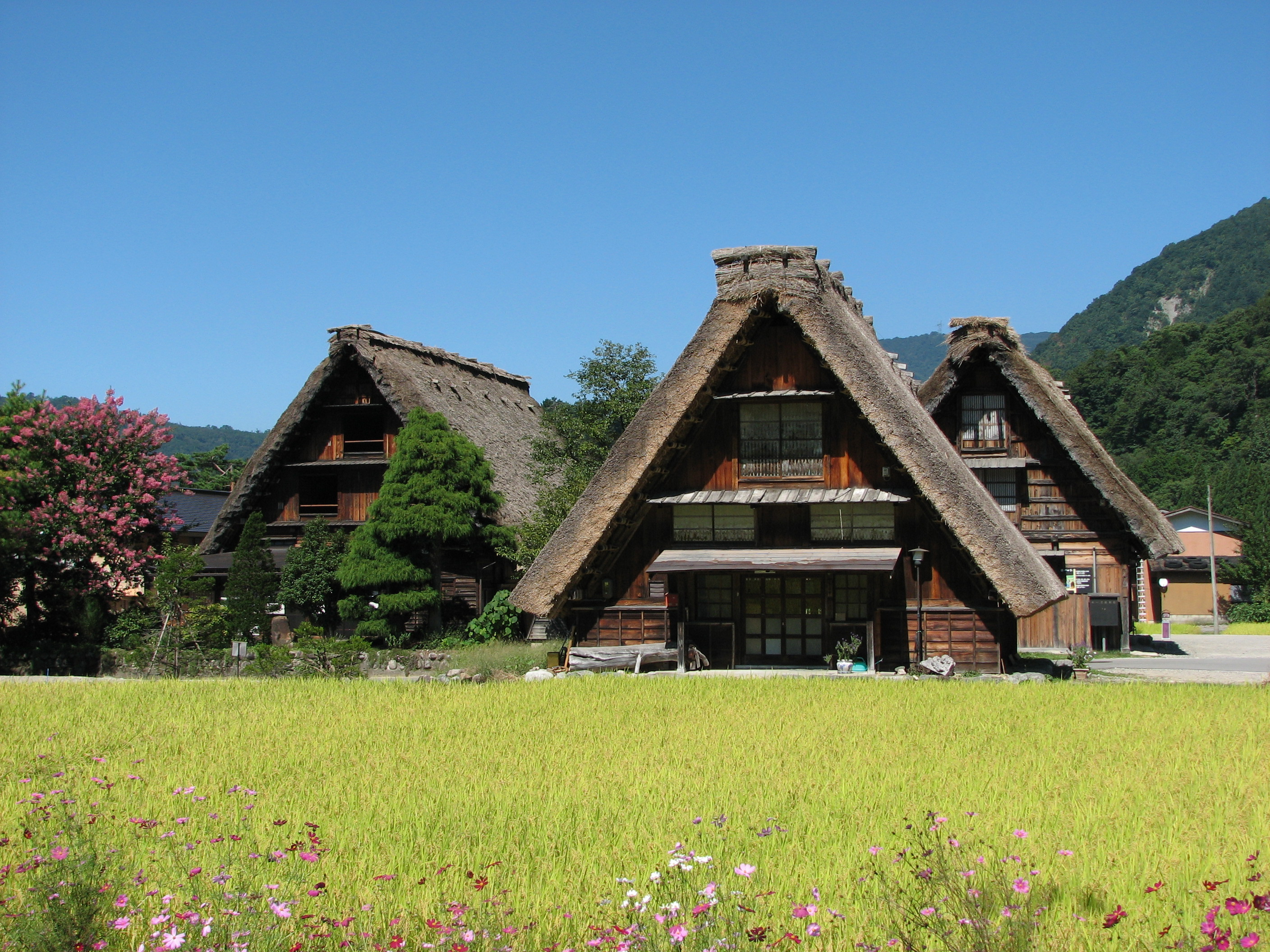
Traditional style of Japanese architecture with a steep thatched roof named "gasshō-zukuri"

Shirakawa-go (Japanese: 白川郷) is located in northwestern Gifu Prefecture, Japan, at the eastern foot of Mount Haku and near the Shō River. The town's claim to fame is its gasshō-zukuri (lit: "like praying hands") style housing, a traditional style of Japanese architecture with a steep thatched roof. It shares these style of housing with its neighbor Gokayama in southwestern Toyama Prefecture.

== Overview ==
In the past, various parts of the town have also been referred to as "Shimo-Shirakawa-go" or "Kamishirakawa-go," but simply "Shirakawa-go" is most common.

The Ogimachi district of Shirakawa-go is different from other Minka villages in Japan as it is still used as a place of actual daily life. Ogimachi is also known as the largest settlement of gasshō-zukuri style buildings in all of Japan. These houses have stayed intact since the 1800s, despite them not being built with nails. The Shirakawa-go World Heritage Gassho-Zukuri Preservation Trust and other organizations are responsible for its preservation. Every year on weekends around January and February, the village is illuminated at night, and tourists are able to sleep in some of the gasshō-zukuri housing throughout the year.

The Ogimachi district of Shirakawa-go is known for its gasshō-zukuri style houses. As a result, in 1976, the village was selected as an Important Preservation District for Groups of Traditional Buildings in recognition of its unique landscape, and in 1995, together with Gokayama, it was registered an UNESCO World Heritage Site.

The Doburoku Festival also takes place in Shirakawa-go in October, where one can watch people perform the Shishi-mai. Doburoku is typically illegal to brew, as it is an unfiltered sake, but it is permitted in designated zones, such as here.

== Places of interest ==
- Gassho-Zukuri Minka-en, Open-air museum
- Wada Family Residence- National Important Cultural Property
- Myozenji Temple- The Kori and Belfry Gate are designated as a Prefecturally Important Cultural Property
- Meizenji Local History Museum
- Nagase Residence
- Kanda Family Residence
- Ennin Museum of Art
- Jiba Workshop
- Doburoku Festival Hall

== Scenery of Shirakawa-go ==
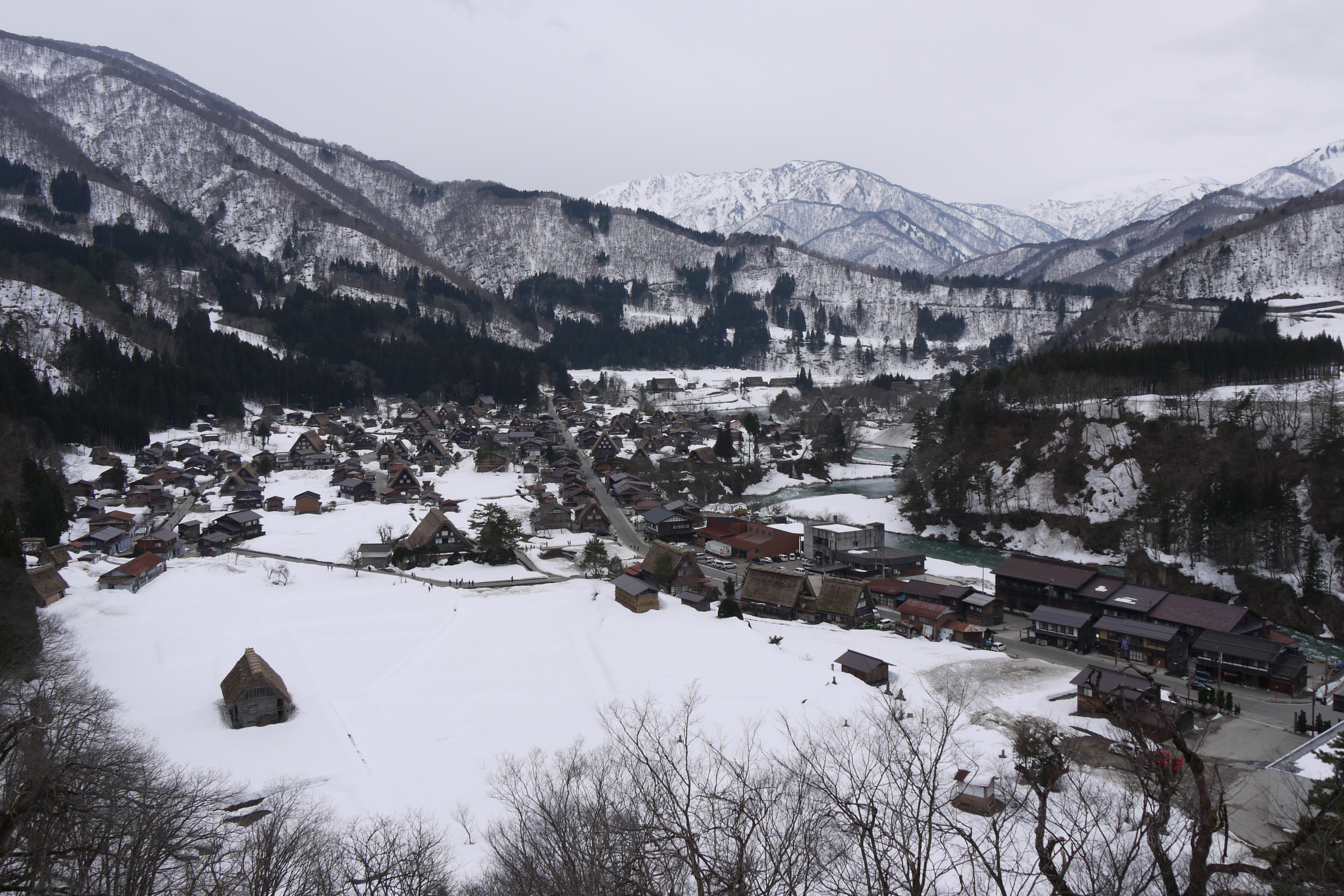
Shirakawa-go in winter

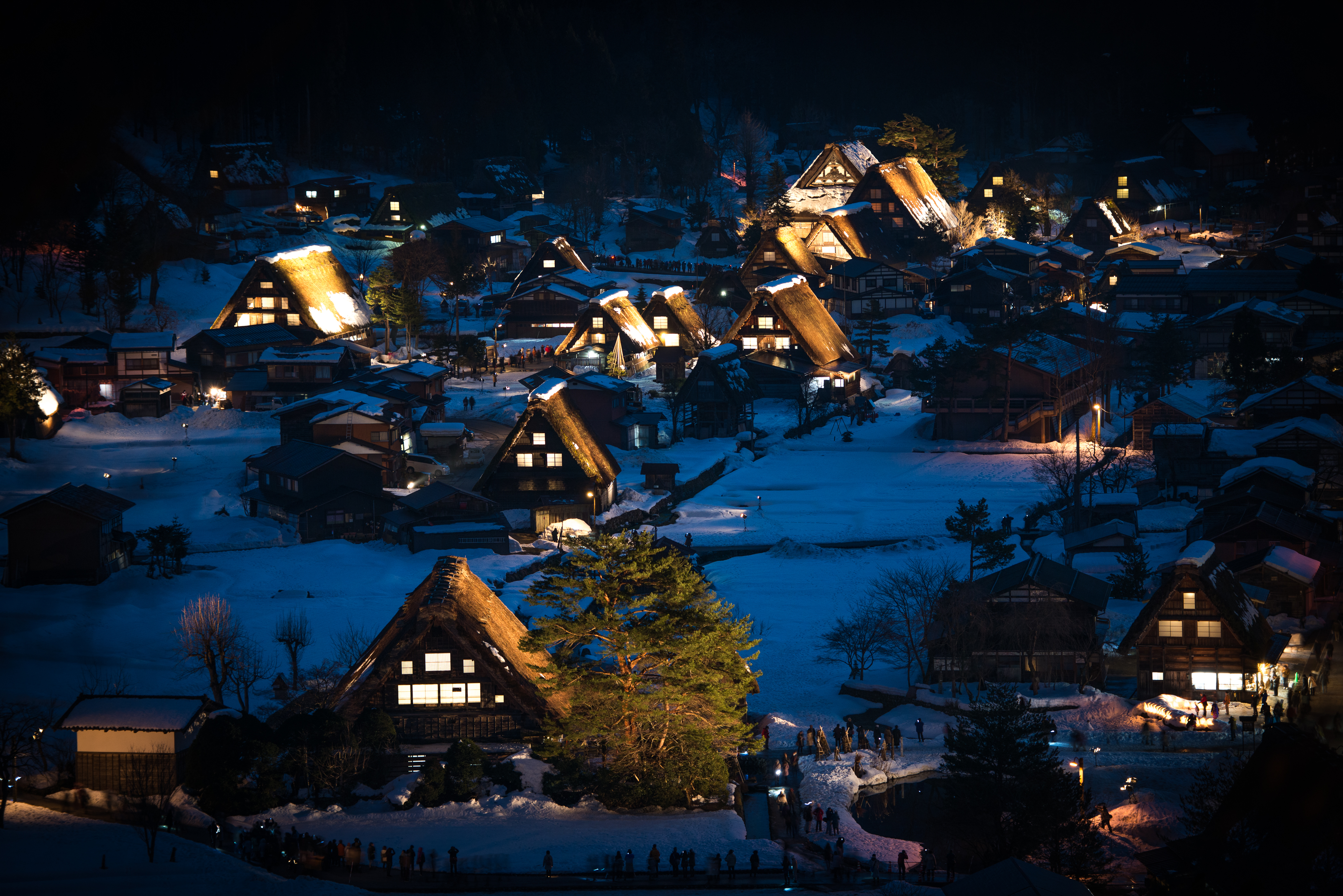
Shirakawa-go in winter, night view

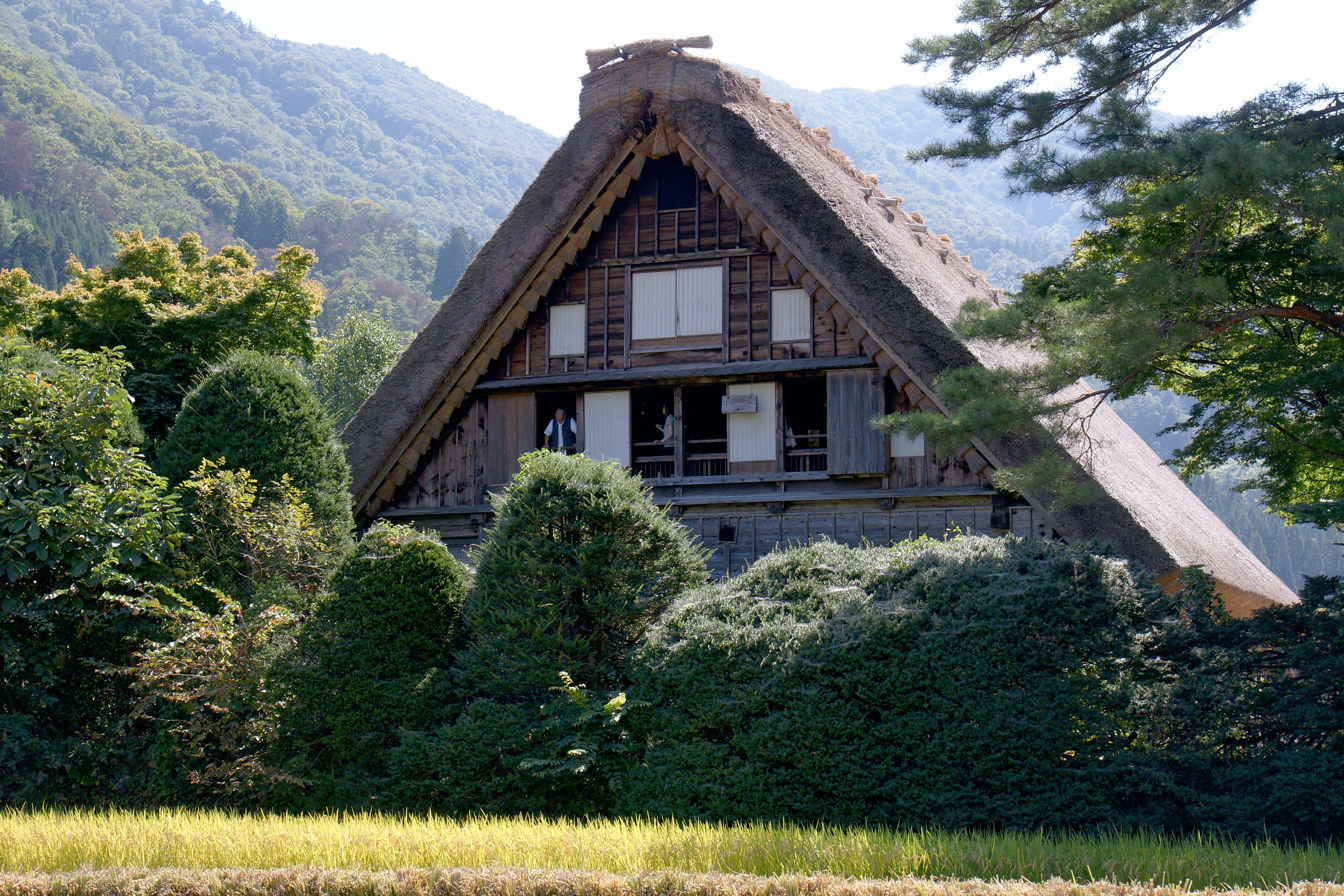
Wada Residence

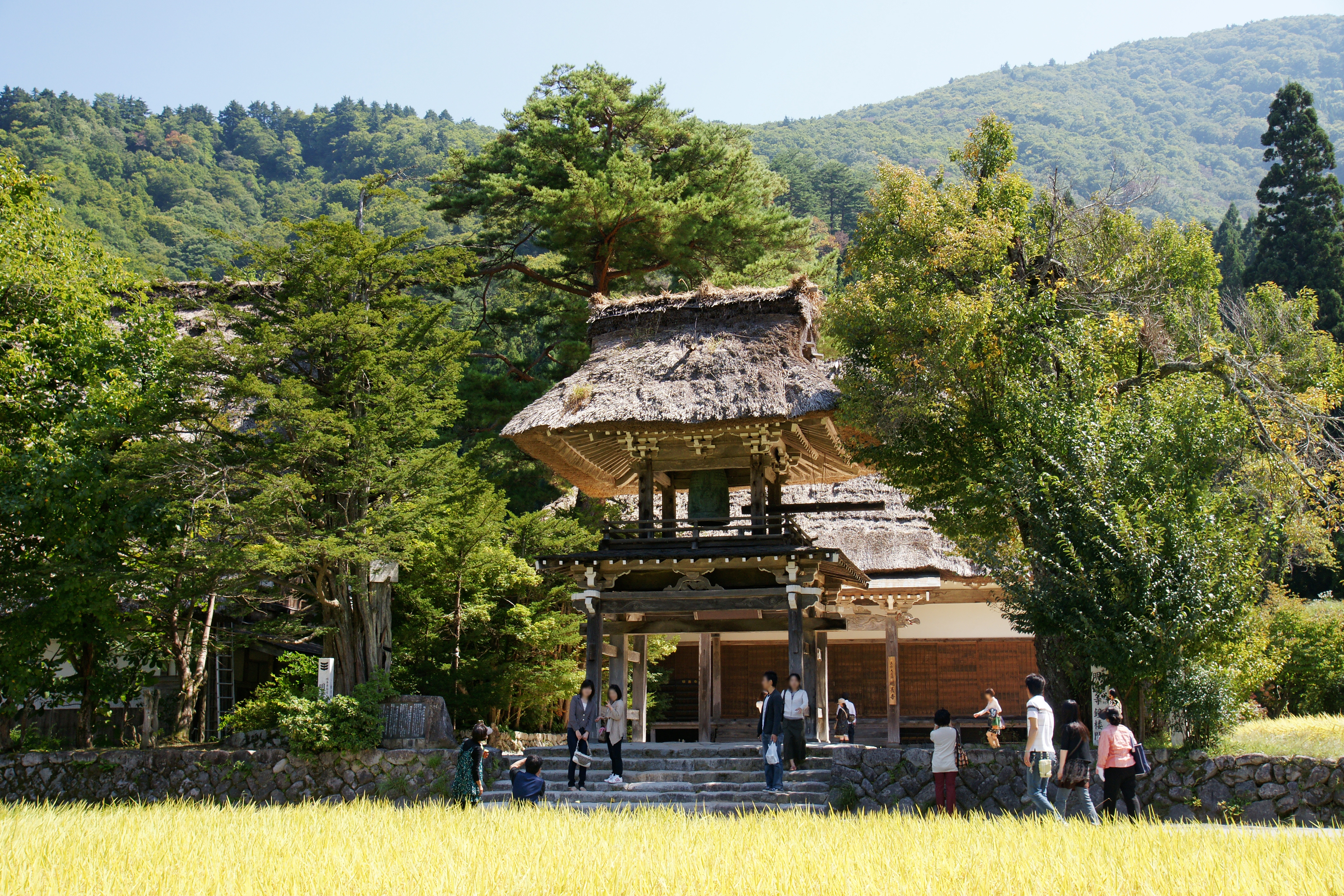
Meizenji Temple

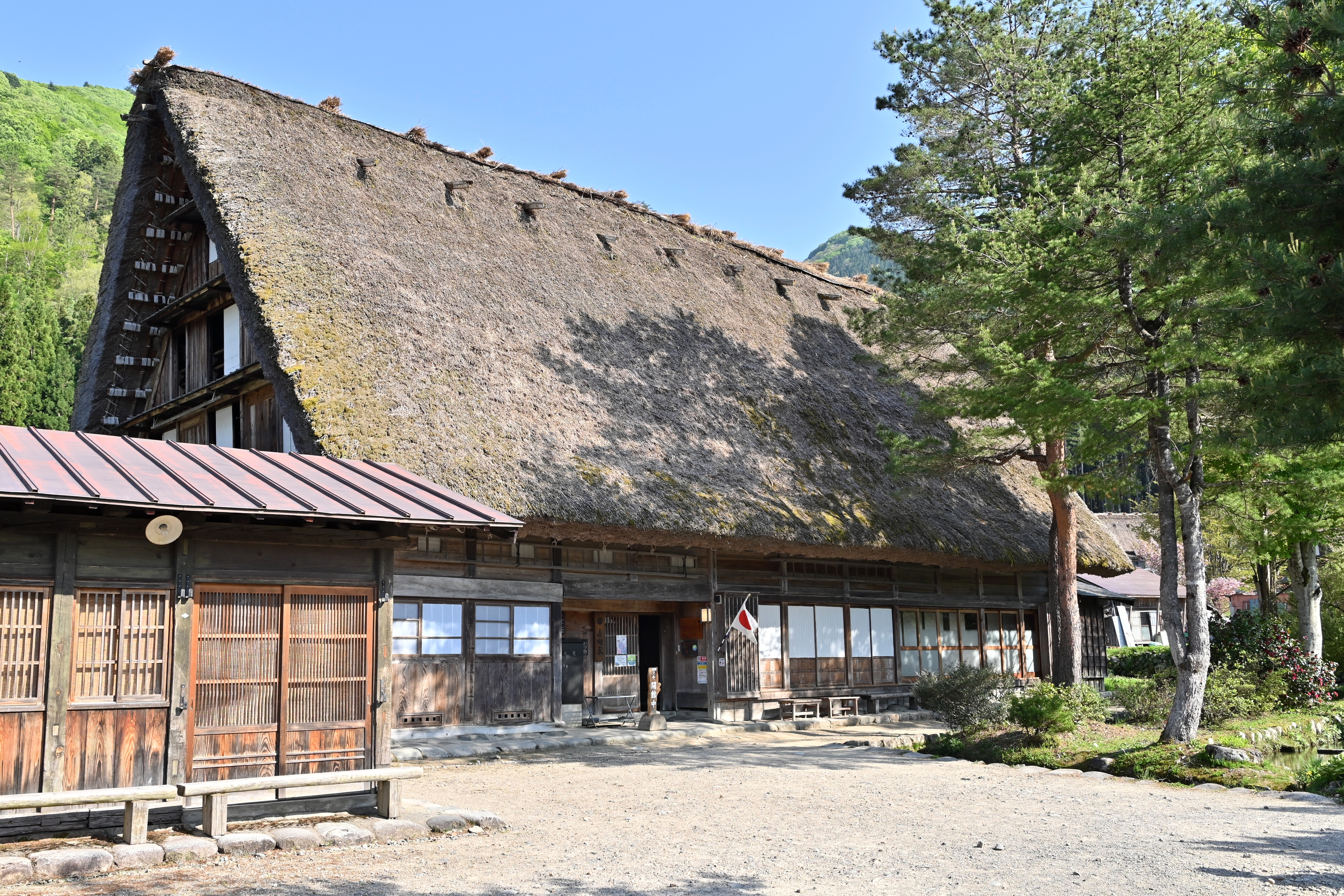
Nagase Family Residence

== In media ==
- Vessel of Sand (Director: Yoshitaro Nomura, Shochiku, produced in 1974)
- Dearest (2021, TBS)
- "Okuhida Shirakawa-go – Gassho Roof Thatching" (1982, NHK)
- Higurashi When They Cry's fictional town of Hinamizawa is based on Shirakawa-go. The visual novel uses various blurred-out photos taken in the real life town.

== See also ==
- Minka
- Historic Villages of Shirakawa-gō and Gokayama
- 日本の秘境100選
- 合掌造り
- 美しい日本の歩きたくなるみち500選
