= Fossa Magna =

Great rift lowland in Japan

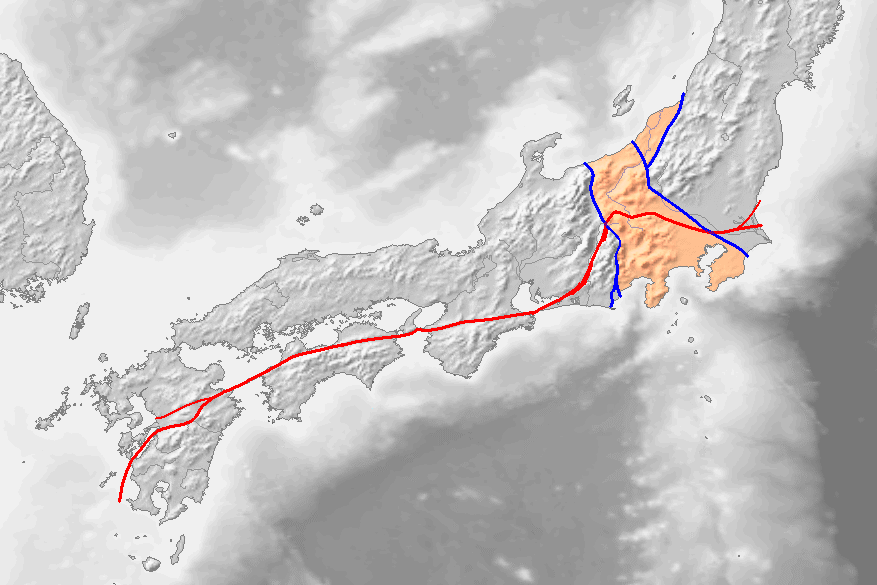
The blue line represents the fault, with the Fossa Magna shaded in orange. The red line indicates Median Tectonic Line.

Fossa Magna is a great rift lowland in Japan. It is often confused with the Itoigawa-Shizuoka Tectonic Line. However, Itoigawa-Shizuoka Tectonic Line is a line; Fossa Magna is an area. Fossa Magna is Latin for "great crevasse". This name was given by Heinrich Edmund Naumann.

== Fossa Magna Museum ==
Fossa Magna Museum is a museum that is located in Itoigawa, Niigata Prefecture. It opened on April 25, 1994. It is part of Itoigawa UNESCO Global Geopark. Itoigawa is located directly above Itoigawa-Shizuoka Tectonic Line and is a place where you can observe a wide variety of rocks, minerals, geological structures and so on. The Fossa Magna Park, a geopark, is also located in Itoigawa.
