= Senya Fault =

Shallow fault system in northern Japan

Coordinates: 39°27′48.42″N 140°36′6.88″E

Senya Fault (千屋断層, Sen'ya Dansō) is a shallow fault system in northern Japan which was responsible for a 7.2 Rikuu earthquake in 1896, along with surface rupture. It is located near the Senya Hills in to the West of the Ou Backbone Range and east of the Yokote Basin in Akita Prefecture.
