= Neodani Fault =

Left lateral split fault in Gifu Prefecture, Japan

- Location: Gifu Prefecture
- Coordinates: 35°37′00″N 136°37′11″E
- Country: Japan
- State: Gifu Prefecture

Tectonics
- Earthquakes: 1891 Mino-Owari earthquake
- Type: left lateral slip fault

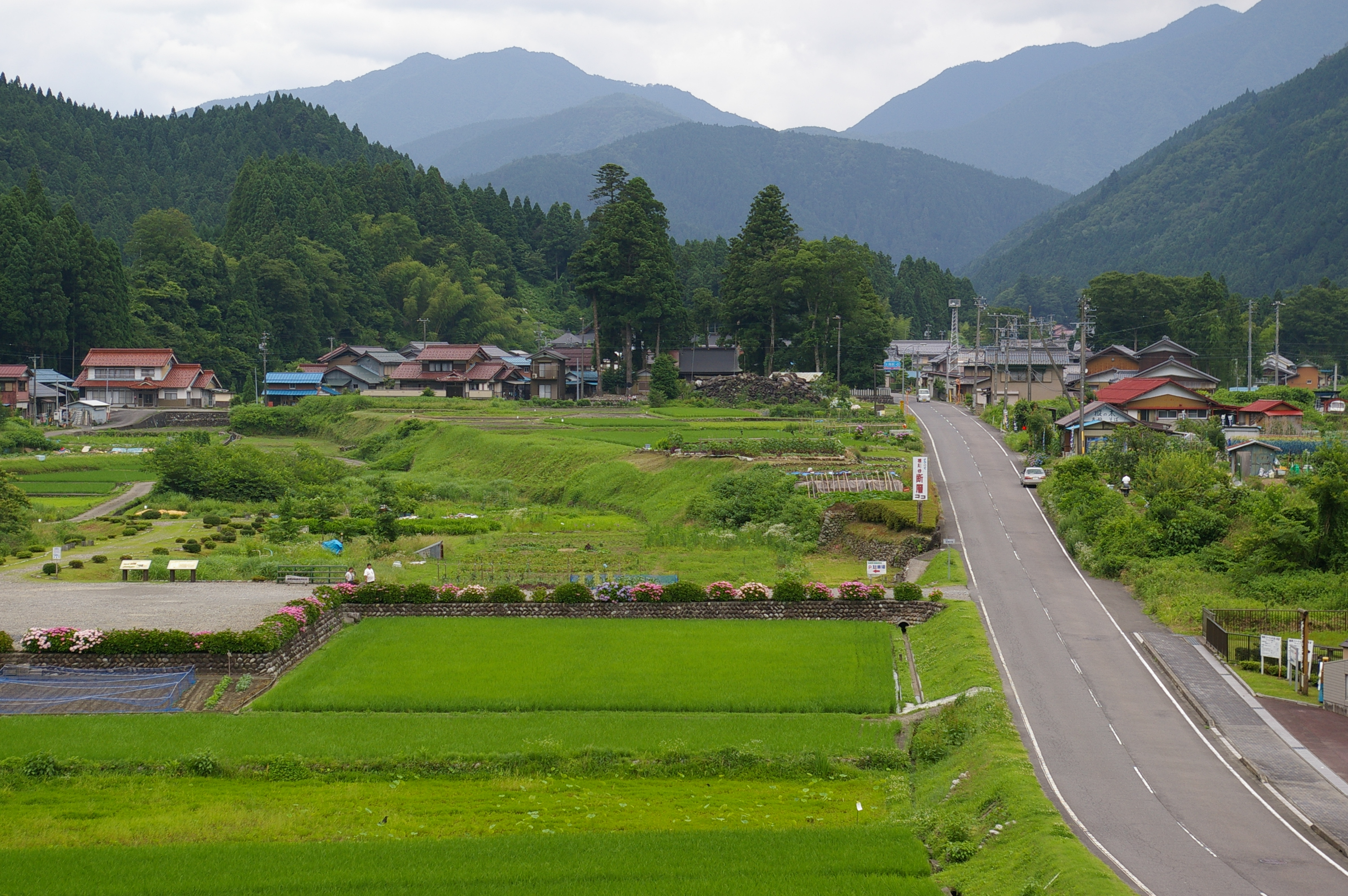
This fault can be seen as a step portion in the center of the photo.

Neodani Fault.

Neodani Fault (根尾谷断層, Neodani Dansō) is a left lateral slip fault in central Japan, Gifu Prefecture, which ruptured causing the 1891 Mino–Owari earthquake (otherwise known as the Nōbi earthquake) in 1891. It caused a 6m vertical offset and 8m left lateral offset, and ruptured over 80 km. The quake was the largest ever recorded in inland Japan.

== See also ==
- List of earthquakes in Japan
