= Nojima Fault =

Geologic fault in Japan responsible of the Great Hanshin (Kobe) earthquake of 1995

Coordinates: 34°32′58″N 134°56′15″E

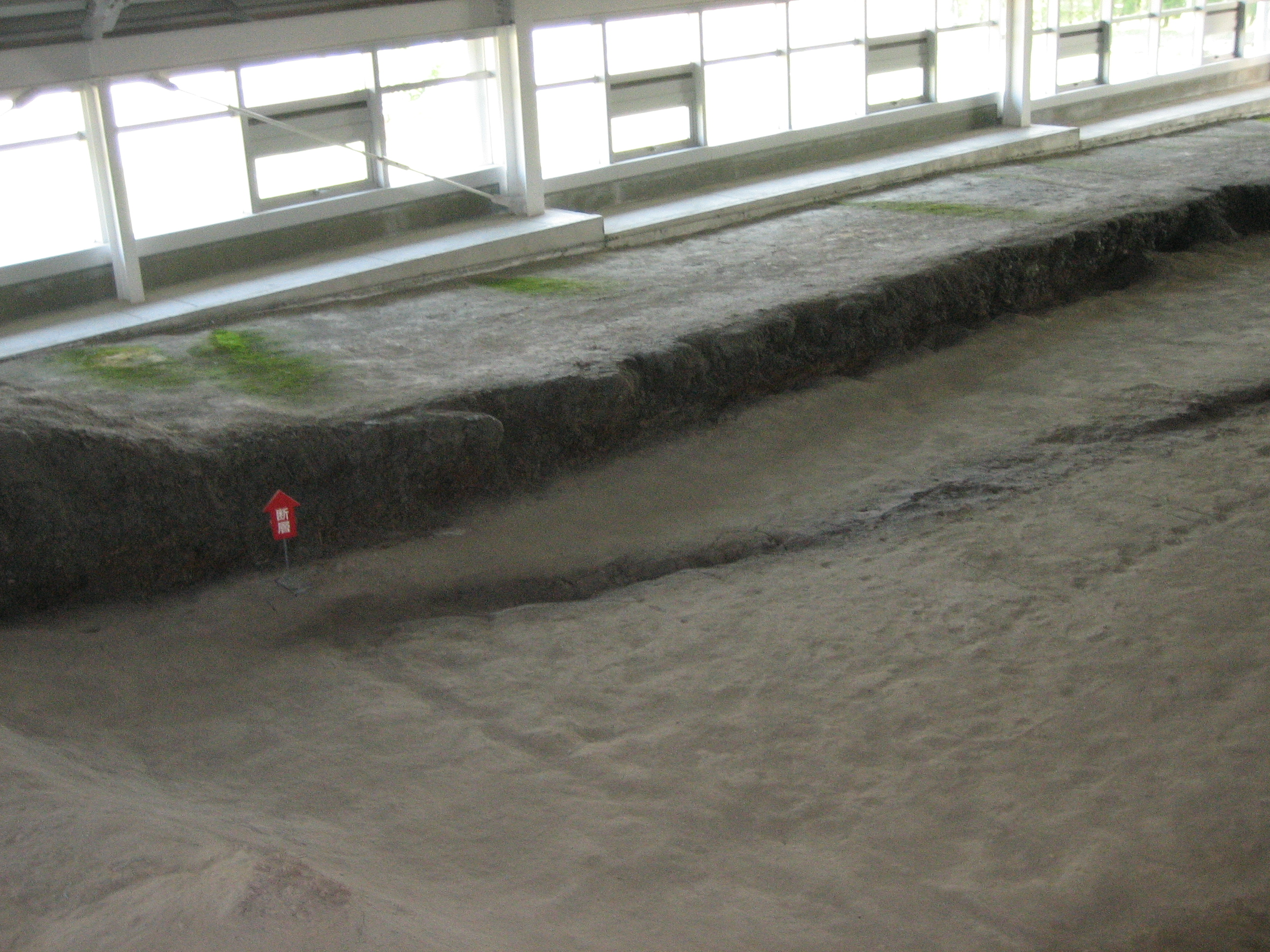
Nojima Fault

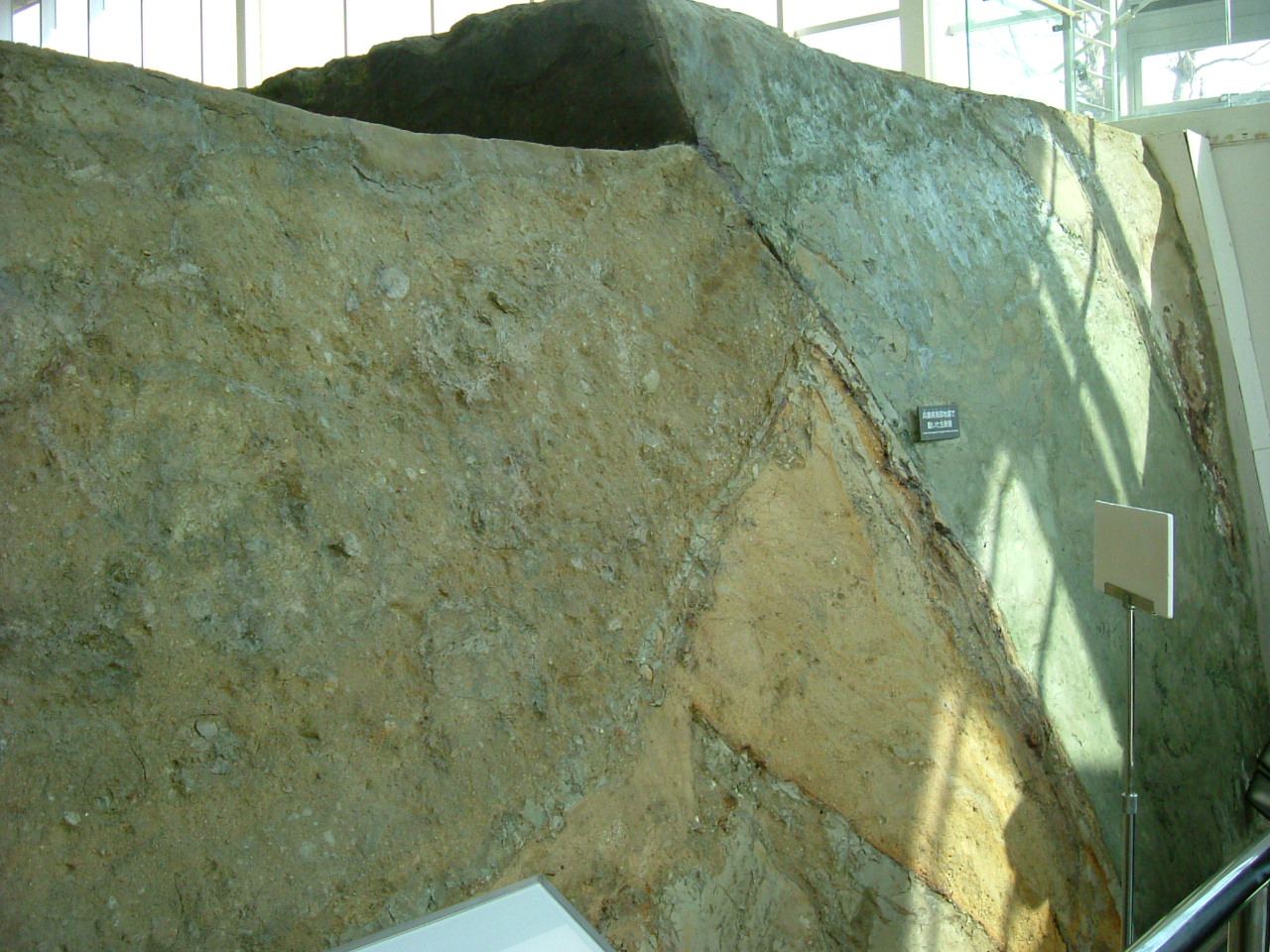
Side view of Nojima Fault

Nojima Fault in relation to 1995 Kobe Quake.

Nojima Fault (野島断層, Nojima Dansō) is a fault that was responsible for the Great Hanshin earthquake of 1995 (Kobe Quake). It cuts across Awaji Island, Japan, and is a branch of the Japan Median Tectonic Line which runs the length of the southern half of Honshu island. The fault line itself and part of the damage caused by the Great Hanshin earthquake is preserved within the Nojima Fault Preservation Museum.

== IUGS geological heritage site ==
In respect of it being "the fault that caused the 1995 Kobe earthquake", the International Union of Geological Sciences (IUGS) included the Nojima Fault in its assemblage of 100 geological heritage sites around the world in a listing published in October 2022. The organisation defines an IUGS Geological Heritage Site as "a key place with geological elements and/or processes of international scientific relevance, used as a reference, and/or with a substantial contribution to the development of geological sciences through history."
