= Japan Median Tectonic Line =

Geological feature in Japan

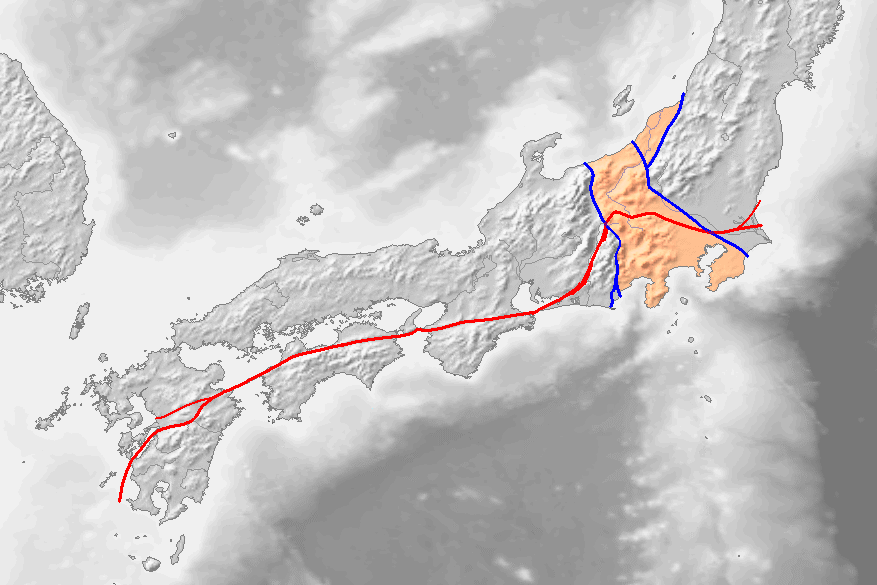
- Red line represents Median Tectonic Line. Orange shaded region is Fossa Magna, bounded by the Itoigawa-Shizuoka Tectonic Line (western blue line).
- Country: Japan

Characteristics
- Segments: multiple
- Displacement: 5 mm (0.20 in)/yr to 10 mm (0.39 in)/yr

Tectonics
- Status: Active
- Earthquakes: Tectonic
- Type: Strike-slip
- Movement: Right-lateral
- Age: Miocene-Holocene
- Japanese Active Fault database or search

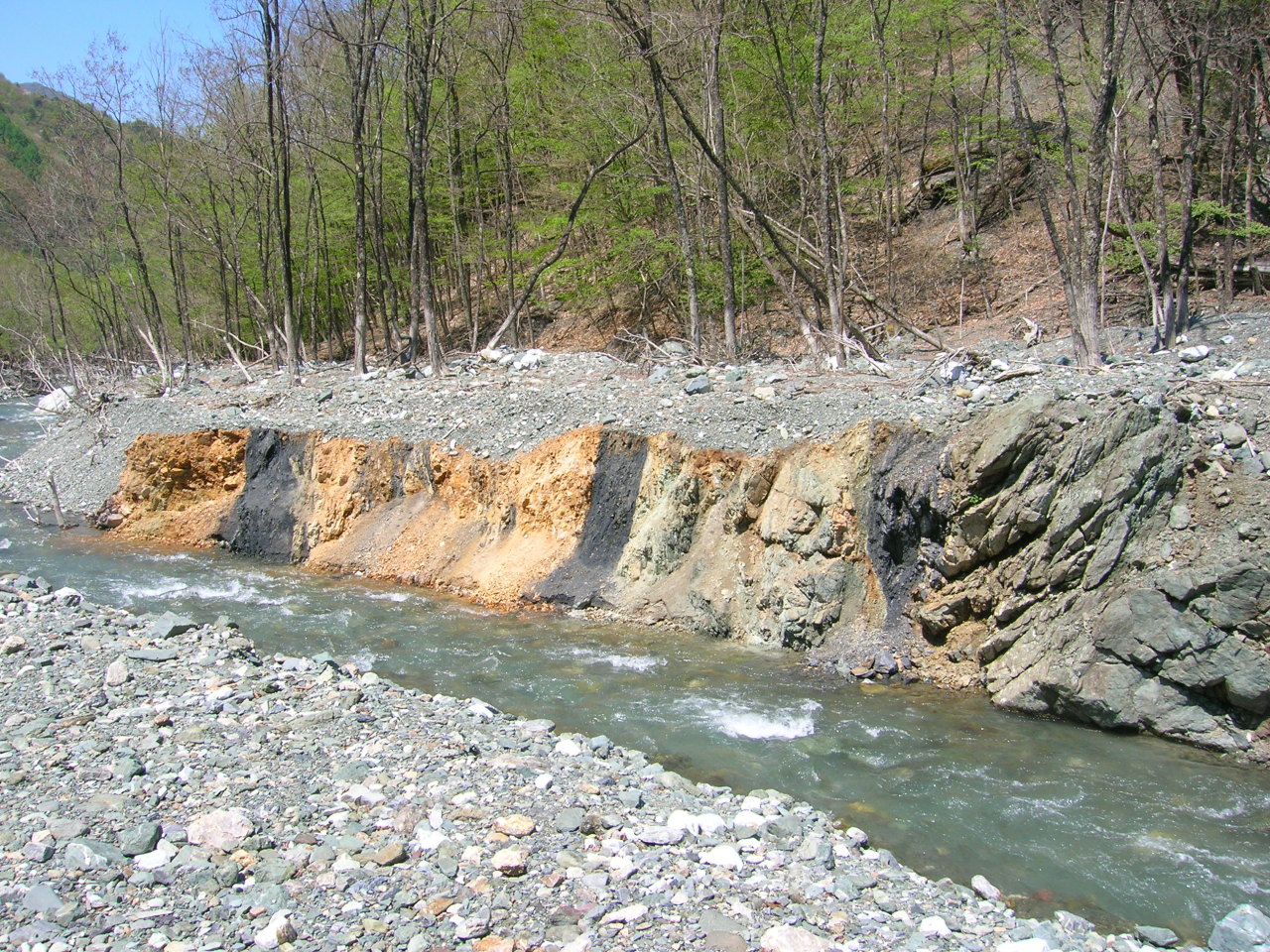
Ankō Outcrop in the village of Ōshika in Nagano Prefecture is a natural monument of Japan.

Japan Median Tectonic Line (中央構造線, Chūō Kōzō Sen), also Median Tectonic Line (MTL), is Japan's longest fault system. The MTL begins near Ibaraki Prefecture, where it connects with the Itoigawa-Shizuoka Tectonic Line (ISTL) and the Fossa Magna. It runs parallel to Japan's volcanic arc, passing through central Honshū to near Nagoya, through Mikawa Bay, then through the Inland Sea from the Kii Channel and Naruto Strait to Shikoku along the Sadamisaki Peninsula and the Bungo Channel and Hōyo Strait to Kyūshū.

The sense of motion on the MTL is right-lateral strike-slip, at a rate of about 5–10 mm/yr. This sense of motion is consistent with the direction of oblique convergence at the Nankai Trough. The rate of motion on the MTL is much less than the rate of convergence at the plate boundary, making it difficult to distinguish the motion on the MTL from interseismic elastic straining in GPS data.

== History ==
The upper part of the Japanese islands were created at the edge of the Eurasian plate 180 million years ago. Then, 50 million years later, the lower part was created at the southern part of the Yangtze continent. The lower part then rode on the Izanagi plate and moved to the upper part. These islands were joined into one and formed the Japanese islands 70 million years ago. The boundary line between the upper part and lower part is the MTL.

== Seismic activity ==
The most important part of the MTL is called the MTL fault zone (中央構造線断層帯, Chūō Kōzōsen Dansōtai) which is an active fault and considered hazardous. It is separated into six regions defined by the most recent seismic activities. Although the MTL is a less seismically active region than others, earthquakes with magnitudes of 6 to 7 have occurred. The oldest known activity occurred about 3000 years ago, and the most recent in the 16th century. It is expected that seismic activities will continue in the future. The boundaries of the regions are still being discussed, so the regions are not well defined.

1. East edge of Kongō Range (between Osaka Prefecture and Nara Prefecture)
  - Expected magnitude of earthquake: 6.9
  - Probability of earthquake: 0 to 5% within 30 years
  - Most recent activity: From 2000 years ago to the 4th century
2. South edge of Izumi Mountains (between Osaka Prefecture and Wakayama Prefecture)
  - Expected magnitude of earthquake: 7.6 to 7.7
  - Probability of earthquake: 0.07 to 14% within 30 years
  - Most recent activity: In the 7th to 9th century
3. Kitan Strait (between Wakayama Prefecture and Hyōgo Prefecture) – Naruto Strait (between Hyōgo Prefecture and Tokushima Prefecture)
  - Expected magnitude of earthquake: 7.6 to 7.7
  - Probability of earthquake: 0.005 to 1% within 30 years
  - Most recent activity: 3100 to 2600 years ago
4. Sanuki Mountains (between Kagawa Prefecture and Tokushima Prefecture) – Eastern part of north edge of Ishizuchi mountains (between Ehime Prefecture and Kōchi Prefecture)
  - Expected magnitude of earthquake: 8
  - Probability of earthquake: 0 to 0.4% within 30 years
  - Most recent activity: In the 16th century
5. North edge of Ishizuchi mountains (between Ehime Prefecture and Kōchi prefecture)
  - Expected magnitude of earthquake: 7.3 to 8
  - Probability of earthquake: 0 to 0.4% within 30 years
  - Most recent activity: In the 16th century
6. Western part of south edge of Ishizuchi mountains – Iyonada (Between Ehime Prefecture and Kōchi Prefecture – southern part of Seto inland sea)
  - Expected magnitude of earthquake: 8 or above
  - Probability of earthquake: 0 to 0.4% within 30 years
  - Most recent activity: In the 16th century..

=== Notable earthquakes ===
The Great Hanshin earthquake of 1995 occurred on the Nojima Fault, a branch of the MTL. Approximately 6,434 people lost their lives; about 4,600 of them were from Kobe. It caused approximately ten trillion yen ($100 billion) in damage, 2.5% of Japan's GDP at the time.

== Regions ==
=== Chūbu ===
The MTL goes from Shizuoka Prefecture to Nagano Prefecture. At Nagano prefecture, it lies between the Ina mountains and the Akaishi mountains. Then, it goes to Chino-shi, the northern part of Nagano prefecture.

=== Kantō ===
The MTL goes from Shimonita in Gunma Prefecture to the Hiki hill district in Saitama Prefecture, and then continues down to the Kantō Plain. In the central Kanto Plain, boring tests have shown that the MTL lies 3000 meters beneath ground level in Saitama Prefecture. It is not clear where the MTL goes from there, but it is thought that it passes beneath Kashima or Ōarai on the Pacific coast in Ibaraki Prefecture.

=== Kinki ===
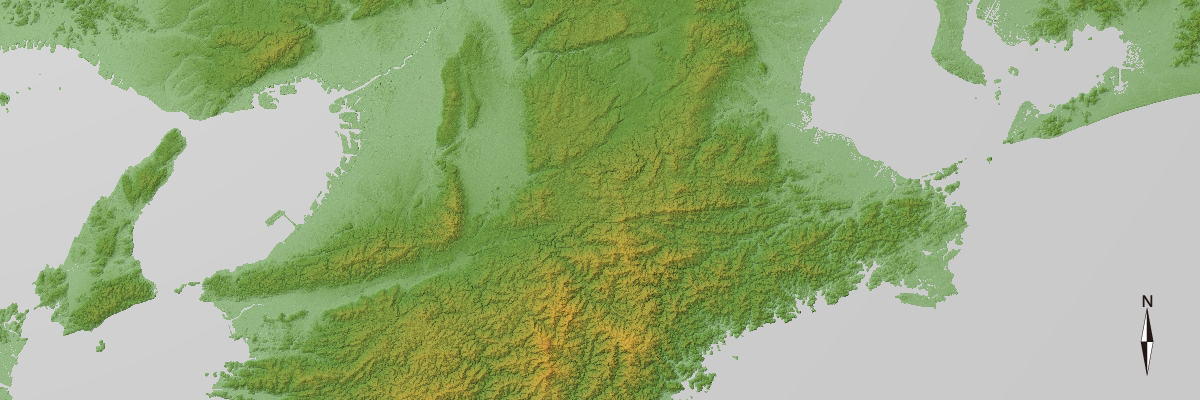
MTL running E-W on Kii Peninsula

The MTL passes south of Awaji Island as it crosses the Kii Channel from Shikoku to the Kii Peninsula. On the Kii Peninsula, it passes north of the Kinokawa River, from Wakayama on the west coast past Gojō in Nara Prefecture (where the river is called the Yoshino River) to Mie Prefecture on the east coast. There is an active shear zone north of the river in the southern foothills of the Izumi Mountains, which separate Wakayama Prefecture from Osaka Prefecture. East of Nara Prefecture, shear zones along the MTL are less active. The MTL takes a northern turn and passes along the eastern foothills of the Kongō Range, connecting to the shear zone along the east side of the Ikoma Mountains between Nara Prefecture and Osaka Prefecture.

=== Kyushu ===
The MTL is known to pass through the region between Kunisaki Peninsula and Saganoseki Peninsula in Ōita Prefecture. However, because the Ōno River basin south of Ōita is covered by late Mesozoic sedimentary rock, the geological continuity in the westward direction is unclear. According to one theory, the MTL may turn south around the Ōno River, connecting Usuki in Ōita Prefecture to the Yatsushiro tectonic line in Kumamoto Prefecture. According to another theory, it may connect Ōita directly to the Kumamoto tectonic line.

=== Shikoku ===
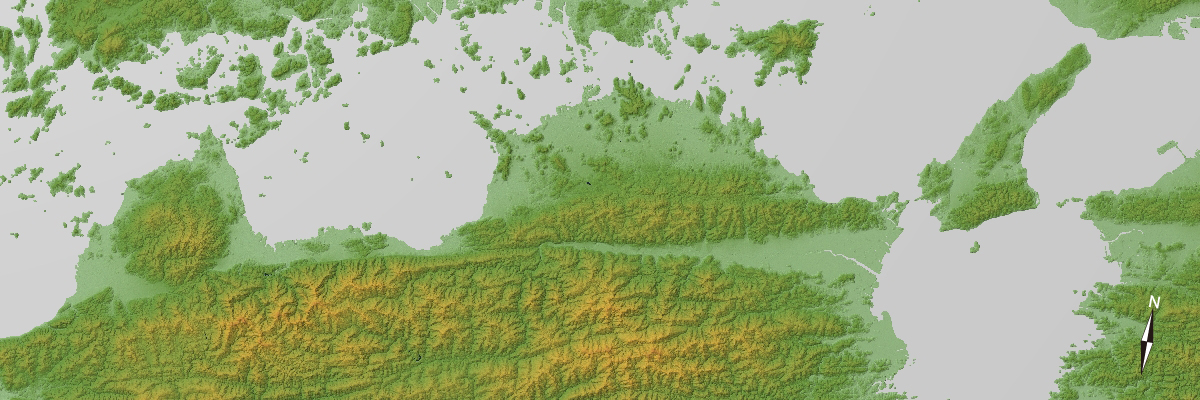
MTL on Shikoku Island

After crossing the Hōyo Strait from Kyushu to Shikoku, the MTL passes north of the Sadamisaki Peninsula to land at Iyo on the west coast of Ehime Prefecture. It continues eastward past the city of Saijō and along the foothills of the Ishizuchi Range. From Miyoshi in Tokushima Prefecture it passes along the northern side of the Yoshino River until it arrives at the city of Tokushima on the east coast of the island. There are active shear zones to the north of the MTL: north of Iyo and, in eastern Shikoku, along the southern foothills of the Sanuki Mountains, at the northern border of Tokushima Prefecture.

== Sight seeing ==
The Japan Median Tectonic Line is visible in forms of several outcrops and fault saddles in Ina city, Ōshika village, and Iida city in southern Nagano Prefecture. The historic Akiha Kodo pilgrimage route (Japan National Route 152) between Suwa-taisha shrine in central Nagano Prefecture and the Akihasan shrine in Shizuoka Prefecture follows the Japan Median Tectonic Line. The Japan Median Tectonic Line Museum in Ōshika is dedicated to the history of and research on the tectonic line.
