= Itoigawa-Shizuoka Tectonic Line =

Geological fault in Japan

Coordinates: 35°29′28.4″N 138°19′33.6″E

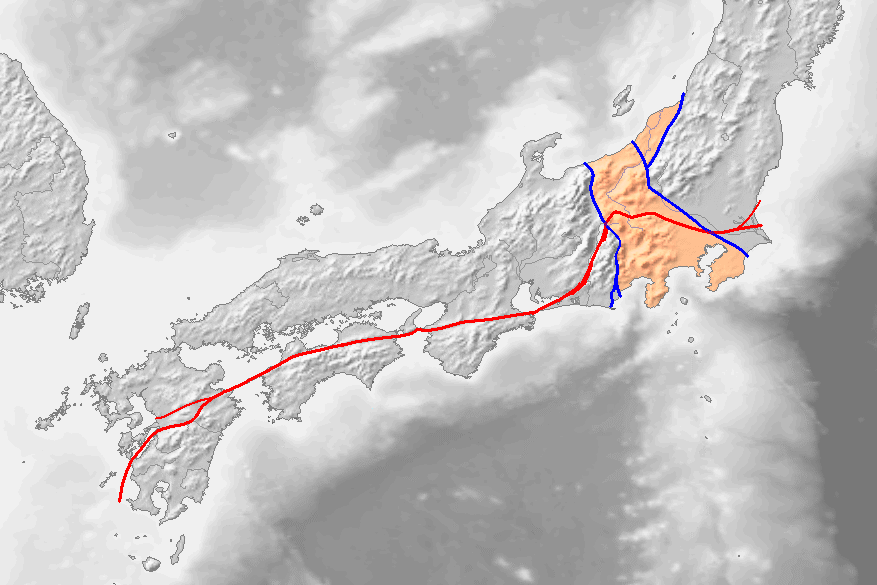
- The blue line represents the fault, with the Fossa Magna shaded in orange. The red line indicates Median Tectonic Line.
- Country: Japan

Characteristics
- Segments: multiple

Tectonics
- Status: Active
- Earthquakes: Tectonic
- Age: Miocene-Holocene
- Japanese Active Fault database or search

Itoigawa-Shizuoka Tectonic Line (ISTL) (糸魚川静岡構造線, Itoigawa Shizuoka Kōzō Sen), also Ito Shizu Sen (糸静線) is a major fault zone on Honshu island running from Itoigawa, Niigata Prefecture, through Lake Suwa, and on to Shizuoka in Shizuoka Prefecture. It is often confused with the Fossa Magna ("great rift"), a geological feature it forms the western boundary of.

== Seismic activity ==
Recent significant earthquakes on this tectonic line include:

- M5.4; 30 June 2011; epicentre near Matsumoto, Nagano; 1 death, 17 injuries.
- M6.7; 22 November 2014; epicentre near Hakuba, Nagano; 46 injuries.
