= List of bridges in Japan =

== Historical bridges ==
	Name	Japanese	Distinction	Length	Type	Carries Crosses	Opened	Location	Prefecture	Ref.
1	Kazurabashi	かずら橋		45 m (148 ft)	Suspension; Woven lianas, steel cables	Footbridge; Iya Valley		Miyoshi; 33°52′30.5″N 133°50′07.4″E	Tokushima	
2	Okuiya Niju Kazurabashi	奥祖谷二重かずら橋		42 m (138 ft)	Suspension; Woven lianas, steel cables	Footbridge; Iya Valley		Miyoshi; 33°51′12.6″N 134°02′44.5″E	Tokushima	
3	Sorihashi	反橋	Itsukushima Shrine; World Heritage Site (1996); Important Cultural Property	20 m (66 ft)	Trestle; Wood; Moon bridge	Footbridge	1557	Miyajima; 34°17′43.3″N 132°19′10.4″E	Hiroshima	
4	Megane Bridge	眼鏡橋	Important Cultural Property (1960)	22 m (72 ft)	Masonry; 2 arches	Footbridge; Nakashima River	1634	Nagasaki; 32°44′49.8″N 129°52′48.3″E	Nagasaki	
5	Kintai Bridge	錦帯橋	National Treasure (1922); Span : 35.1 m (115 ft)	193 m (633 ft)	Arch; Wooden beam	Footbridge; Nishiki River	1673	Iwakuni; 34°10′03.5″N 132°10′41.9″E	Yamaguchi	
6	Saruhashi Bridge	猿橋		31 m (102 ft)	Beam; Cantilever wooden beams	Footbridge; Katsura River	1756	Ōtsuki; 35°36′56.5″N 138°58′48.8″E	Yamanashi	
7	Megane-bashi (Isahaya)	眼鏡橋 (諫早市)		49 m (161 ft)	Masonry; 2 arches	Footbridge; Pond of Isahaya Park	1839	Isahaya; 32°50′43.6″N 130°02′56.8″E	Nagasaki	
8	Reitai Bridge	霊台橋	Important Cultural Property (1967)		Masonry; 1 arch	Footbridge; Midori River	1847	Misato; 32°37′45.3″N 130°53′17.7″E	Kumamoto	
9	Tsūjun Bridge	通潤橋	Largest stone aqueduct in Japan; Important Cultural Property (1960)	84 m (276 ft)	Masonry; 271 arches	Aqueduct; Rogataki River	1854	Yamato; 32°40′54.1″N 130°59′37.4″E	Kumamoto	
10	Saya Bridge	鞘橋	Contribute to the historical landscape of the country (1998)	23 m (75 ft)	Covered; Wood	Footbridge; Kanakura River	1869	Kotohira; 34°11′08.3″N 133°49′17.9″E	Kagawa	
11	Mikohata Cast Iron Bridge	神子畑鋳鉄橋	Important Cultural Property (1977)		Arch; Cast iron	Footbridge; Mikobata River	1885	Asago; 35°15′04.4″N 134°43′59.4″E	Hyōgo	
12	Nijūbashi	二重橋	Lead to Edo Castle		Arch	Footbridge; Edo Castle moats	1888	Tokyo; 35°40′48.8″N 139°45′13.0″E	Tokyo; Chiyoda	
13	Seimon Ishibashi	皇居正門石橋	Lead to Edo Castle		Masonry; 2 arches	Footbridge; Edo Castle moats	1888	Tokyo; 35°40′47.9″N 139°45′16.9″E	Tokyo; Chiyoda	
14	Shinkyo Bridge	神橋	Shrines and Temples of Nikkō; World Heritage Site (1999)	28 m (92 ft)	Beam	Footbridge; Daiya River	1904	Nikkō; 36°45′12.0″N 139°36′14.5″E	Tochigi	
15	Otoshi Bridge	遠登志橋	Important Cultural Property (2005)	48 m (157 ft)	Arch; Steel deck arch	Footbridge; Kojoro River	1905	Niihama; 33°53′27.0″N 133°18′40.8″E	Ehime	
16	Nihonbashi	日本橋	Important Cultural Property (1999)	49 m (161 ft)	Masonry; 2 arches	Japan National Route 14; Nihonbashi River	1911	Tokyo; 35°41′02.6″N 139°46′28.2″E	Tokyo; Chiyoda	
17	Mino Bridge	美濃橋	Oldest existing modern suspension bridge in Japan; Important Cultural Property (2003)	116 m (381 ft)	Suspension; Steel truss deck, concrete pylons	Footbridge; Nagara River	1916	Mino; 35°33′08.1″N 136°54′37.6″E	Gifu	
18	Momosuke Bridge	桃介橋	Important Cultural Property (1994)	248 m (814 ft)	Suspension; Wooden deck 24+104+104+24	Footbridge; Kiso River	1922	Nagiso; 35°36′03.1″N 137°36′24.7″E	Nagano	
19	South Kawachi Bridge	南河内橋	Important Cultural Property (2006)	133 m (436 ft)	Lenticular truss Steel	Footbridge; Itabitsu	1926	Kitakyushu; 33°49′38.3″N 130°48′03.8″E	Fukuoka	
20	Eitai Bridge	永代橋	Important Cultural Property (2007)	185 m (607 ft)	Arch; Steel tied-arch	Eitai Dori Avenue; Sumida River	1926	Tokyo; 35°40′34.6″N 139°47′15.2″E	Tokyo; Chūō - Kōtō	
21	Hijiri Bridge	聖橋		92 m (302 ft)	Arch; Concrete deck arch	Hongo Dori 403; Kanda River	1927	Tokyo; 35°41′59.2″N 139°45′55.9″E	Tokyo; Bunkyō - Chiyoda	
22	Kiyosu Bridge	清洲橋	Important Cultural Property (2007)	186 m (610 ft)	Suspension; Chain self-anchored bridge	Kiyosu-bashi Dori 474; Sumida River	1928	Tokyo; 35°40′56.6″N 139°47′30.8″E	Tokyo; Chūō - Kōtō	
23	Bandai Bridge	萬代橋	Important Cultural Property (2004)	307 m (1,007 ft)	Arch; Concrete	Japan National Route 7 Shinano River	1929	Niigata; 37°55′10.4″N 139°03′11.2″E	Niigata	
24	Aioi Bridge	相生橋	Target for the 1945 Hiroshima atomic bomb	123 m (404 ft)	Beam; Steel	Aioi Dori 183; Ōta River	1932	Hiroshima; 34°23′47.3″N 132°27′09.2″E	Hiroshima	
25	Chikugo River Lift Bridge	筑後川昇開橋	Important Cultural Property (2003); Mechanical Engineering Heritage (2007)	507 m (1,663 ft)	Truss; Steel; Vertical-lift bridge	Footbridge; Saga Railway Line (closed); Chikugo River	1935	Saga - Ōkawa; 33°12′52.9″N 130°21′44.5″E	Saga; Fukuoka	
26	Taushubetsu Bridge	タウシュベツ川橋梁			Arch; Concrete	Out of order Otofuke River	1937	Kamishihoro; 43°24′55.8″N 143°11′21.3″E	Hokkaido	
27	Kachidoki Bridge	勝鬨橋	Important Cultural Property (2007)	246 m (807 ft)	Arch; Steel tied-arch Bascule bridge	Harumi Dori 304; Sumida River	1940	Tokyo; 35°39′44.1″N 139°46′29.6″E	Tokyo; Chūō	

== Architectural bridges ==
	Name	Japanese	Distinction	Length	Type	Carries Crosses	Opened	Location	Prefecture	Ref.
1	Kobe Bridge	神戸大橋	Tanaka Prize (1970); Civil Engineering Heritage Site (2022); Span : 217 m (712 ft)	319 m (1,047 ft)	Arch; Double-deck steel arch 51+217+51	Kobe Harbour	1970	Kobe; 34.67899°N 135.20319°E	Hyōgo	
2	Kawazu-Nanadaru Loop Bridge	河津七滝ループ橋	Tanaka Prize (1981)	440 m (1,440 ft)	Box girder Steel	Japan National Route 414	1981	Kawazu; 34°47′31.0″N 138°56′19.4″E	Shizuoka	
3	Chuo Bridge	中央大橋		211 m (692 ft)	Cable-stayed; Steel beam deck, steel pylon	Tokyo Route 463; Sumida River	1993	Tokyo; 35°40′17.3″N 139°47′04.2″E	Tokyo; Chūō	
4	Shirakobato Bridge	しらこばと橋		145 m (476 ft)	Cable-stayed; Steel deck, steel pylon	Saitama Prefectural road No. 115; Motoara River	1994	Koshigaya; 35°53′18.1″N 139°47′54.5″E	Saitama	
5	Shiosai Bridge	潮騒橋	Tanaka Prize (1995)	232 m (761 ft)	Stressed ribbon Concrete; 55+61+61+55	Footbridge; Kikukawa River	1995	Kakegawa; 34°38′54.5″N 138°03′43.0″E	Shizuoka	
6	Teleport Bridge	テレポートブリッジ		341 m (1,119 ft)	Cable-stayed; Steel deck, steel pylon	Footbridge; Bayshore Route	1996	Tokyo; 35°37′41.3″N 139°46′44.6″E	Tokyo; Kōtō - Minato	
7	Yumetsuri Bridge	夢吊橋	Tanaka Prize (1996); Span : 147 m (482 ft)	172 m (564 ft)	Stressed ribbon Concrete	Footbridge; Ashida River	1996	Fuchū; 34°35′08.8″N 133°08′26.1″E	Hiroshima	
8	Ushibuka Haiya Bridge	牛深ハイヤ大橋	Tanaka Prize (1997); Civil Engineering Design Prize (2001); Designed by Renzo Piano	883 m (2,897 ft)	Box girder Steel	East China Sea	1997	Ushibuka; 32°11′31.8″N 130°01′37.8″E	Kumamoto	
9	Kujira Bridge	くじら橋	Tanaka Prize (1997); Span : 100 m (330 ft)	107 m (351 ft)	Box girder Prestressed concrete		1997	Inagi; 35°38′04.4″N 139°29′08.4″E	Tokyo	
10	Raiden Todoroki Bridges	雷電廿六木橋	Civil Engineering Design Prize (2010)	345 m (1,132 ft); 270 m (890 ft)	Box girder Prestressed concrete 34+75+125+75+34; 35+50+75+65+45	Japan National Route 140; Nakatsu River	1998	Chichibu; 35°57′23.9″N 138°54′17.0″E	Saitama	
11	Goshiki Zakura Bridge	五色桜大橋	Tanaka Prize (2002)		Arch; 2 levels steel tied-arch	Ojikita Metropolitan Expressway Central Circular; Arakawa River	2002	Tokyo; 35°45′54.7″N 139°45′36.1″E	Tokyo; Adachi	
12	Oboro Bridge	朧大橋	Tanaka Prize (2002); Civil Engineering Design Prize 2004	293 m (961 ft)	Arch; Concrete deck arch	Fukuoka prefectural road No. 798	2002	Kurume; 33°16′36.8″N 130°37′50.5″E	Fukuoka	
13	Seiun Bridge	青雲橋	Tanaka Prize (2004); FIB Award for Outstanding Structure (2006)	97 m (318 ft)	Stressed ribbon Concrete	Yoshino River	2004	Miyoshi; 33°57′34.9″N 133°44′42.3″E	Tokushima	
14	Omiodori Bridge	近江大鳥橋	Tanaka Prize (2007)	555 m (1,821 ft)	Extradosed; Composite steel/concrete deck, concrete pylons 137+170+115+67; 152+160+90+72	Shin-Meishin Expressway	2007	Ōtsu - Kōka; 34°56′27.7″N 136°01′57.4″E	Shiga	
15	Fudo Bridge	不動大橋	Lowest girder depth (6m) / longest span (155m) for composite truss in Japan; Tanaka Prize (2010)	590 m (1,940 ft)	Extradosed; Composite steel/concrete deck, concrete pylons 63+125+155+155+88	Gunma Prefectural Road No. 375; Agatsuma River	2010	Naganohara; 36°32′43.8″N 138°41′13.9″E	Gunma	

== Major bridges ==
	Name	Japanese	Span	Length	Type	Carries Crosses	Opened	Location	Prefecture	Ref.
1	Akashi Kaikyō Bridge	明石海峡大橋	1,991 m (6,532 ft)	3,911 m (12,831 ft)	Suspension; 2 levels steel truss deck, steel pylons 960+1991+960	Kobe-Awaji-Naruto Expressway; Akashi Strait	1998	Kobe - Awaji Island; 34°37′01.3″N 135°01′18.9″E	Hyōgo	(Note: The length given only takes into account the main bridge, central span(s) and shore span(s), approach viaducts are not counted.)
2	Minami Bisan-Seto Bridge	南備讃瀬戸大橋	1,100 m (3,600 ft)	13,100 m (43,000 ft)	Suspension; 2 levels steel truss deck, steel pylons 274+1100+274	Seto-Chūō Expressway; Seto-Ōhashi Line; Seto Inland Sea	1989	Sakaide - Yoshima Island; 34°21′50.0″N 133°49′30.7″E	Kagawa	
3	Third Kurushima-Kaikyō Bridge	来島海峡第三大橋	1,030 m (3,380 ft)	4,105 m (13,468 ft)	Suspension; Steel box girder deck, steel pylons	Nishiseto Expressway; Seto Inland Sea	1999	Imabari - Umashima Island; 34°06′54.9″N 132°59′03.6″E	Ehime	
4	Second Kurushima-Kaikyō Bridge	来島海峡第二大橋	1,020 m (3,350 ft)	4,105 m (13,468 ft)	Suspension; Steel box girder deck, steel pylons 250+1020+62x4	Nishiseto Expressway; Seto Inland Sea	1999	Umashima Island - Ōshima Island; 34°07′16.0″N 133°00′00.7″E	Ehime	
5	Kita Bisan-Seto Bridge	北備讃瀬戸大橋	990 m (3,250 ft)	13,100 m (43,000 ft)	Suspension; 2 levels steel truss deck, steel pylons 274+990+274	Seto-Chūō Expressway; Seto-Ōhashi Line; Seto Inland Sea	1988	Sakaide - Yoshima Island; 34°22′42.4″N 133°49′13.2″E	Kagawa	
6	Shimotsui-Seto Bridge	下津井瀬戸大橋	940 m (3,080 ft)	13,100 m (43,000 ft)	Suspension; 2 levels steel truss deck, steel pylons 130+940+130	Seto-Chūō Expressway; Seto-Ōhashi Line; Seto Inland Sea	1988	Kurashiki - Hitsuishi Island; 34°25′52.0″N 133°48′20.7″E	Okayama	
7	Tatara Bridge	多々羅大橋	890 m (2,920 ft)	1,480 m (4,860 ft)	Cable-stayed; Steel truss deck, steel pylons 164+890+257+63	Nishiseto Expressway; Seto Inland Sea	1999	Ikuchi Island - Ōmishima Island; 34°15′35.7″N 133°03′52.6″E	Hiroshima - Ehime	
8	Ōnaruto Bridge	大鳴門橋	876 m (2,874 ft)	1,629 m (5,344 ft)	Suspension; Steel truss deck, steel pylons93+330+876+330	Kobe-Awaji-Naruto Expressway; Naruto Strait	1985	Naruto - Awaji Island; 34°14′19.5″N 134°39′01.1″E	Tokushima - Hyōgo	
9	Innoshima Bridge	因島大橋	770 m (2,530 ft)	1,270 m (4,170 ft)	Suspension; Steel truss deck, steel pylons 250+770+250	Nishiseto Expressway; Seto Inland Sea	1983	Innoshima Island - Mukoujima Island; 34°21′25.7″N 133°10′49.5″E	Hiroshima	
10	Akinada Bridge	安芸灘大橋	750 m (2,460 ft)	1,175 m (3,855 ft)	Suspension; Steel box girder deck, steel pylons 170+750+255	Aki-nada Ohashi Toll Road; Seto Inland Sea	2000	Kure - Shimokamagari Island; 34°12′22.4″N 132°40′45.8″E	Hiroshima	
11	Hakuchō Bridge	白鳥大橋	720 m (2,360 ft)	1,540 m (5,050 ft)	Suspension; Steel box girder deck, steel pylons 80+330+720+330+80	Japan National Route 37; Muroran Bay	1998	Muroran; 42°21′10.0″N 140°56′59.0″E	Hokkaido	
12	Kanmon Bridge	関門橋	712 m (2,336 ft)	1,068 m (3,504 ft)	Suspension; Steel truss deck, steel pylons	Chūgoku Expressway; AH1; Kanmon Straits	1973	Kitakyushu - Shimonoseki; 33°57′42.2″N 130°57′31.3″E	Fukuoka - Yamaguchi	
13	First Kurushima-Kaikyō Bridge	来島海峡第一大橋	600 m (2,000 ft)	4,105 m (13,468 ft)	Suspension; Steel box girder deck, steel pylons 50+140+600+170	Nishiseto Expressway; Seto Inland Sea	1999	Umashima Island - Ōshima Island; 34°06′54.9″N 132°59′03.6″E	Ehime	
14	Meikō-Chūō Bridge	名港中央大橋	590 m (1,940 ft)		Cable-stayed; Steel box girder deck, steel pylons	Isewangan Expressway; Ise Bay	1998	Nagoya; 35°03′12.5″N 136°51′37.2″E	Aichi	
15	Rainbow Bridge	レインボーブリッジ	570 m (1,870 ft)	3,750 m (12,300 ft)	Suspension; 2 levels steel truss deck, steel pylons	Daiba Route; Tokyo Bay	1993	Tokyo; 35°38′11.6″N 139°45′47.4″E	Tokyo; Minato	
16	Hakata–Ōshima Bridge	伯方・大島大橋	560 m (1,840 ft)	1,193 m (3,914 ft)	Suspension; Steel box girder deck, steel pylons	Nishiseto Expressway; Seto Inland Sea	1988	Ōshima - Hakata Island; 34°11′32.2″N 133°04′20.2″E	Ehime	
17	Toyoshima Bridge	豊島大橋	540 m (1,770 ft)	930 m (3,050 ft)	Suspension; Steel box girder deck, steel pylons	Hiroshima prefectural road No. 356; Seto Inland Sea	2008	Teshima Island - Kami-Kamagari Island; 34°10′35.1″N 132°46′06.9″E	Hiroshima	
18	Minato Bridge	港大橋	510 m (1,670 ft)		Cantilever; Steel; 2 levels 235+510+235	Hanshin Expressway; Bayshore Route; Bayshore Line; Osaka Port Line; Osaka Bay	1973	Osaka; 34°38′40.9″N 135°26′17.2″E	Osaka	
19	Tsurumi Tsubasa Bridge	鶴見つばさ橋	510 m (1,670 ft)		Cable-stayed; Steel box girder deck, steel pylons	Bayshore Route; Tokyo Bay	1994	Yokohama; 35°28′19.3″N 139°41′57.1″E	Kanagawa	
20	Ikuchi Bridge	生口橋	490 m (1,610 ft)		Cable-stayed; Steel box girder deck, steel pylons 50x3+490+50x3	Nishiseto Expressway; Seto Inland Sea	1991	Innoshima Island - Ikuchi Island; 34°18′14.7″N 133°09′00.2″E	Hiroshima	
21	Higashi Kobe Bridge	東神戸大橋	485 m (1,591 ft)		Cable-stayed; 2 level steel truss deck, steel pylons 73+127+485+127+73	Hanshin Expressway; Bayshore Line; Osaka Bay	1992	Kobe; 34°42′34.4″N 135°17′23.5″E	Hyōgo	
22	Megami Bridge	女神大橋	480 m (1,570 ft)		Cable-stayed; Steel box girder deck, steel pylons 200+480+200	Nagasaki Megami Ohashi Road; Nagasaki Bay	2006	Nagasaki; 32°43′17.5″N 129°50′58.5″E	Nagasaki	
23	Hirado Bridge	平戸大橋	465 m (1,526 ft)	880 m (2,890 ft)	Suspension; Steel truss deck, steel pylons 48+47+465+54	Japan National Route 383; Hirado Strait	1977	Hirado - Tabirahiradoguchi; 33°21′25″N 129°34′20.6″E	Nagasaki	
24	Yokohama Bay Bridge	横浜ベイブリッジ	460 m (1,510 ft)		Cable-stayed; 2 levels steel truss deck, steel pylons 200+460+200	Bayshore Route; Japan National Route 357; Tokyo Bay	1989	Yokohama; 35°27′16.9″N 139°40′26.5″E	Kanagawa	
25	Tokyo Gate Bridge	東京ゲートブリッジ	440 m (1,440 ft)	2,933 m (9,623 ft)	Cantilever; Steel; 160+440+160	Tokyoko Rinkai-doro; Tokyo Bay	2012	Tokyo; 35°36′37.7″N 139°49′34.3″E	Tokyo; Kōtō - Ōta	
26	Iwakurojima Bridge	岩黒島橋	420 m (1,380 ft)	13,100 m (43,000 ft)	Cable-stayed; 2 levels steel truss deck, steel pylons 185+420+185	Seto-Chūō Expressway; Seto-Ōhashi Line; Seto Inland Sea	1988	Yoshima Island - Iwakurojima Island; 34°24′06.0″N 133°48′32.1″E	Kagawa	
27	Hitsuishijima Bridge	櫃石島橋	420 m (1,380 ft)	13,100 m (43,000 ft)	Cable-stayed; 2 levels steel truss deck, steel pylons 185+420+185	Seto-Chūō Expressway; Seto-Ōhashi Line; Seto Inland Sea	1988	Hitsuishijima Island - Iwakurojima Island; 34°24′34.1″N 133°48′24.8″E	Kagawa	
28	Meikō-Higashi Bridge	名港東大橋	410 m (1,350 ft)		Cable-stayed; Steel box girder deck, steel pylons	Isewangan Expressway; Ise Bay	1998	Nagoya; 35°03′12.7″N 136°52′42.6″E	Aichi	
29	Meikō-Nishi Bridge	名港西大橋	406 m (1,332 ft)		Cable-stayed; Steel box girder deck, steel pylons	Isewangan Expressway; Ise Bay	1985; 1997	Nagoya; 35°03′06.6″N 136°50′03.4″E	Aichi	
30	Ikitsuki Bridge	生月大橋	400 m (1,300 ft)	960 m (3,150 ft)	Truss; Steel; 200+400+200	Nagasaki prefectural road 42; East China Sea	1991	Ikitsuki - Hirado Island; 33°21′11.0″N 129°26′18.9″E	Nagasaki	
31	Takashima Hizen Bridge	鷹島肥前大橋	400 m (1,300 ft)	1,251 m (4,104 ft)	Cable-stayed; Steel box girder deck, concrete pylons	Nagasaki prefectural road 109; Saga prefectural road 109; Hibisuido Strait	2009	Matsuura - Karatsu; 33°26′22.1″N 129°47′14.9″E	Nagasaki - Saga	
32	Hiroshima Airport Bridge	広島空港大橋	380 m (1,250 ft)	800 m (2,600 ft)	Arch; Steel deck arch	Hiroshima prefectural road No. 49; Hiroshima Central Flight Road; Numata River	2010	Mihara; 34°27′26.7″N 132°55′37.2″E	Hiroshima	
33	Wakato Bridge	若戸大橋	367 m (1,204 ft)	2,100 m (6,900 ft)	Suspension; Steel truss deck, steel pylons	Japan National Route 199; Dokai Bay	1962	Kitakyushu; 33°54′10.1″N 130°48′59.6″E	Fukuoka	
34	Shin-Minato Bridge	新湊大橋	360 m (1,180 ft)	3,600 m (11,800 ft)	Cable-stayed; Steel box girder deck, steel pylons 60x2+360+60x2	Toyama Bay; Imizu Port	2012	Imizu; 36°46′33.0″N 137°06′55.8″E	Toyama	
35	Yamatogawa Bridge	大和川橋梁	355 m (1,165 ft)	653 m (2,142 ft)	Cable-stayed; Steel box girder deck, steel pylons 149+355+149	Hanshin Expressway; Bayshore Route; Yamato River	1985	Osaka - Sakai; 34°36′17.2″N 135°27′31.8″E	Osaka	
36	Tenpozan Bridge	天保山大橋	350 m (1,150 ft)		Cable-stayed; Steel box girder deck, steel pylons 170+350+120	Hanshin Expressway; Bayshore Line; Kyū-Yodo River	1990	Osaka; 34°39′34.5″N 135°25′57.1″E	Osaka	
37	Maizuru Crane Bridge	舞鶴クレインブリッジ	350 m (1,150 ft)	735 m (2,411 ft)	Cable-stayed; Steel box girder deck, steel pylons 160+350+160	Maizuru Bay	1998	Maizuru; 35°30′35.2″N 135°23′16.2″E	Kyoto	
38	Ōshima Bridge (Nagasaki)	大島大橋	350 m (1,150 ft)	1,095 m (3,593 ft)	Cable-stayed; Steel box girder deck, steel pylons	Nagasaki prefectural road No. 52; Yobukonoseto Strait	1999	Saikai - Oshima Island; 33°02′15.2″N 129°38′30.7″E	Nagasaki	
39	Tenjō Bridge	天城橋	348 m (1,142 ft)	465 m (1,526 ft)	Arch; Steel through arch	Misumi-Oyano Road; Misuminoseto Strait	2018	Uki - Ōyano-jima; 32°36′43.2″N 130°27′32.5″E	Kumamoto	
40	Mihara Bridge	美原大橋	340 m (1,120 ft)	973 m (3,192 ft)	Cable-stayed; Steel box girder deck, steel pylons 154+340+154	Japan National Route 337; Ishikari River	2005	Ebetsu; 43°07′10.9″N 141°34′54.6″E	Hokkaido	
41	Ōshima Bridge (Yamaguchi)	大島大橋 (山口県)	325 m (1,066 ft)	1,020 m (3,350 ft)	Truss; Steel; 200+325+200	Japan National Route 437; Obatakeseto Strait	1976	Yanai - Suō-Ōshima; 33°57′29.6″N 132°11′07.2″E	Yamaguchi	
42	Ikina Bridge	生名橋	315 m (1,033 ft)	515 m (1,690 ft)	Cable-stayed; Steel box girder deck, steel pylons 98+315+98	Ehime Prefectural Road No. 338; Seto Inland Sea	2011	Ikina Island - Sa Island; 34°15′26.4″N 133°11′14.6″E	Ehime	
43	Shin Kizugawa Bridge	新木津川大橋	305 m (1,001 ft)	495 m (1,624 ft)	Arch; Steel through arch	Kizu River (Osaka)	1994	Osaka; 34°37′33.0″N 135°27′46.9″E	Osaka	
44	Tenmon Bridge	天門橋	300 m (980 ft)	502 m (1,647 ft)	Truss; Steel; 100+300+100	Japan National Route 266; Misuminoseto Strait	1966	Uki - Ōyano-jima; 32°36′39.9″N 130°27′31.7″E	Kumamoto	
45	Kuronoseto Bridge	黒之瀬戸大橋	300 m (980 ft)	502 m (1,647 ft)	Truss; Steel; 100+300+100	Japan National Route 389; Kurono Strait	1974	Izumi - Nagashima; 32°06′22.0″N 130°10′26.0″E	Kagoshima	
46	Konohana Bridge	此花大橋	300 m (980 ft)	540 m (1,770 ft)	Suspension; Self-anchored, steel box girder deck, steel pylons 120+300+120	Osaka Bay	1987	Osaka; 34°39′59.3″N 135°24′52.8″E	Osaka	
47	Ohmishima Bridge	大三島橋	297 m (974 ft)	328 m (1,076 ft)	Arch; Steel through arch	Nishiseto Expressway; Seto Inland Sea	1979	Ohmishima Island - Hakata Island; 34°12′57.7″N 133°03′20.3″E	Ehime	
48	Second Ondo Bridge	音戸大橋	280 m (920 ft)	492 m (1,614 ft)	Arch; Steel through arch	Japan National Route 487; Ondo-no Strait	2013	Kure - Kurahashi-jima; 34°11′53.3″N 132°32′19.9″E	Hiroshima	
49	Konaruto Bridge	小鳴門大橋	280 m (920 ft)		Cable-stayed; Steel box girder deck, steel pylons	Tokushima Prefectural Road No. 11; Konaruto Strait	1998	Naruto - Oge Island; 34°12′01.2″N 134°35′24.7″E	Tokushima	
50	Yumemai Bridge	夢舞大橋	280 m (920 ft)	878 m (2,881 ft)	Arch; Steel through arch Pontoon bridge Moveable bridge	Osaka Bay	2001	Osaka; 34°39′31.6″N 135°23′58.4″E	Osaka	
51	Eto Bridge	干支大橋	275 m (902 ft)	385 m (1,263 ft)	Arch; Steel through arch	Japan National Route 218; Gokase River	1995	Nobeoka; 32°36′15.2″N 131°28′45.2″E	Miyazaki	
52	Twinkle Kisogawa Bridge	木曽川橋	275 m (902 ft)(x3)	1,145 m (3,757 ft)	Extradossed; Concrete box girder deck, concrete pylons 160+275x3+160	Isewangan Expressway; Kiso River	2001	Kuwana; 35°02′18.5″N 136°44′31.8″E	Mie	
53	Twinkle Ibigawa Bridge	揖斐川橋	271 m (889 ft)(x4)	1,397 m (4,583 ft)	Extradossed; Concrete box girder deck, concrete pylons 154+271x4+157	Isewangan Expressway; Ibi River	2001	Kuwana; 35°01′43.1″N 136°42′58.1″E	Mie	
54	Ujina Bridge	宇品大橋	270 m (890 ft)		Box girder Steel; 139+270+139	Hiroshima Expressway Route 3 Hiroshima Bay	1998	Hiroshima; 34°21′26.3″N 132°28′49.4″E	Hiroshima	
55	Fujikawa Bridge	富士川橋	265 m (869 ft)	381 m (1,250 ft)	Arch; Concrete deck arch	Shin-Tōmei Expressway; Fuji River	2005	Shizuoka; 35°10′54.4″N 138°36′42.3″E	Shizuoka	
56	Yabegawa Bridge	矢部川大橋	261 m (856 ft)	517 m (1,696 ft)	Cable-stayed; Concrete box girder deck, concrete pylons 128+261+128	Ariake Sea Coastal Road; Yabe River	2009	Miyama - Yanagawa; 33°06′52.1″N 130°26′06.9″E	Fukuoka	
57	Saigo Bridge	西郷大橋	260 m (850 ft)	270 m (890 ft)	Arch; Steel through arch	Sea of Japan	1977	Okinoshima; 36°12′05.2″N 133°19′24.8″E	Shimane	
58	Ikara Bridge	伊唐大橋	260 m (850 ft)	675 m (2,215 ft)	Cable-stayed; Concrete box girder deck, concrete pylons 120+260+120	Yatsushiro Sea	1996	Nagashima; 32°13′07.0″N 130°11′08.7″E	Kagoshima	
59	Fuchu Yotsuya Bridge	府中四谷橋	260 m (850 ft)		Cable-stayed; Steel box girder deck, steel pylons	Tama River	1997	Hino - Fuchū; 35°39′34.6″N 139°26′24.1″E	Tokyo	
60	Tensho Takamatu Bridge	天翔大橋	260 m (850 ft)	463 m (1,519 ft)	Arch; Concrete deck arch	Gokase River	2000	Hinokage; 32°40′57.0″N 131°19′56.1″E	Miyazaki	
61	Chitose Bridge	千歳橋	260 m (850 ft)	365 m (1,198 ft)	Arch; Steel deck arch 260+105	Osaka Bay	2003	Osaka; 34°38′46.8″N 135°27′32.5″E	Osaka	
62	Awa Shirasagi Bridge	阿波しらさぎ大橋	260 m (850 ft)		Cable-stayed; Steel box girder deck, steel pylons 140+260+105	Tokushima Prefectural Road No. 29; Yoshino River	2012	Tokushima; 34°04′51.8″N 134°34′49.0″E	Tokushima	
63	Kamagari Bridge	蒲刈大橋	255 m (837 ft)	480 m (1,570 ft)	Truss; Steel; 85+255+85	Seto Inland Sea	1979	Shimokamagari - Teshima Island; 34°11′05.3″N 132°41′03.4″E	Hiroshima	
64	Kishiwada Bridge	岸和田大橋	255 m (837 ft)	455 m (1,493 ft)	Arch; Steel tied-arch 95+255+95	Bayshore Route; Osaka Bay	1993	Kishiwada; 34°28′08.6″N 135°22′11.4″E	Osaka	
65	Jōgakura Bridge	城ヶ倉大橋	255 m (837 ft)	360 m (1,180 ft)	Arch; Steel deck arch	Japan National Route 394	1995	Aomori; 40°38′59.9″N 140°49′32.9″E	Aomori	
66	Shin Hamadera Bridge	新浜寺大橋	254 m (833 ft)	256 m (840 ft)	Arch; Steel tied-arch	Bayshore Route; Osaka Bay	1994	Sakai; 34°32′59.9″N 135°26′29.4″E	Osaka	
67	Nishinomiyako Bridge	西宮浜大橋	252 m (827 ft)		Arch; Steel tied-arch	Bayshore Route; Osaka Bay	1994	Nishinomiya; 34°42′51.3″N 135°20′29.5″E	Hyōgo	
68	Suehiro Bridge	末広大橋	250 m (820 ft)		Cable-stayed; Steel box girder deck, steel pylons 110+250+110	Tokushima Prefectural Road No. 29; Shinmachi River	1975	Tokushima; 34°03′33.2″N 134°34′20.4″E	Tokushima	
69	Yobuko Bridge	呼子大橋	250 m (820 ft)	728 m (2,388 ft)	Cable-stayed; Concrete box girder deck, concrete pylons 121+250+121	Genkai Sea	1989	Yobuko - Kabe Island; 33°32′37.2″N 129°52′52.6″E	Saga	
70	Namihaya Bridge	なみはや大橋	250 m (820 ft)	1,740 m (5,710 ft)	Box girder Steel, curved bridge 170+250+170	Line No. 5 Yao Osaka Port; Osaka Bay	1995	Osaka; 34°38′44.8″N 135°27′00.2″E	Osaka	
71	Imari Bay Bridge	伊万里湾大橋	250 m (820 ft)	651 m (2,136 ft)	Arch; Steel tied-arch 70+250+70	Imari Bay	2003	Imari; 33°18′13.4″N 129°49′47.1″E	Saga	
72	Eshima Ohashi Bridge	江島大橋	250 m (820 ft)	1,704 m (5,591 ft)	Box girder Prestressed concrete 55+150+250+150+55	Nakaumi	2004	Sakaiminato; 35°31′08.4″N 133°12′00.5″E	Tottori	

== Major footbridges ==
	Name	Japanese	Span	Height	Type	Carries Crosses	Opened	Location	Prefecture	Ref.
1	Kokonoe Yume Suspension Bridge	九重"夢"大吊橋	390 m (1,280 ft)	173 m (568 ft)	Suspension; Steel	Footbridge; Naruko River	2006	Kokonoe; 33°10′26″N 131°13′36″E	Ōita	
2	Ryujin Bridge	竜神峡	375 m (1,230 ft)	117 m (384 ft)	Suspension; Steel	Footbridge	1994	Hitachiōta; 36°41′02″N 140°27′56.9″E	Ibaraki	
3	Momijidani Suspension Bridge	もみじ谷大吊橋	320 m (1,050 ft)		Suspension; Steel	Footbridge; Naka River	1999	Nasushiobara; 36°57′13.3″N 139°52′50.6″E	Tochigi	
4	Miyagase Suspension Bridge	水の郷大つり橋	315 m (1,033 ft)		Suspension; Steel	Footbridge; Lake Miyagase	1995	Miyagase; 35°31′25.2″N 139°13′44.2″E	Kanagawa	
5	Tanise Suspension Bridge	谷瀬の吊り橋	294 m (965 ft)	54 m (177 ft)	Suspension; Steel	Footbridge; Kumano River	1954	Totsukawa; 34°06′07.2″N 135°45′46.0″E	Nara	
6	Aya Teruha Suspension Bridge	照葉大吊橋	250 m (820 ft)	142 m (466 ft)	Suspension; Steel	Footbridge; Ryonan River	1984	Aya; 32°01′47.2″N 131°11′39.9″E	Miyazaki	
7	Mii-Soyokaze Bridge	三井そよかぜ橋	231 m (758 ft)		Suspension; Steel	Footbridge; Sagami River	2012	Midori-ku; 35°35′19.8″N 139°16′04.7″E	Kanagawa	
8	Ueno Skybridge	上野スカイブリッジ	225 m (738 ft)	90 m (300 ft)	Suspension; Steel	Footbridge	1998	Ueno; 36°04′19″N 138°46′43″E	Gunma	

== Notes and references ==
- Notes
- Agency for Cultural Affairs. "Cultural Heritage Online". bunka.nii.ac.jp (in Japanese).
- Japan Society of Civil Engineers. "Winners of Tanaka Prize". jsce.or.jp (in Japanese).
- Nicolas Janberg. "International Database for Civil and Structural Engineering". Structurae.com.
- Others references

== See also ==
- Transport in Japan
- List of bridges in Kyoto
- 土木学会田中賞 (in Japanese) - Liste des prix de la Société des ingénieurs civils Tanaka
