= 1957 Isahaya floods =

1957 natural disaster in Japan

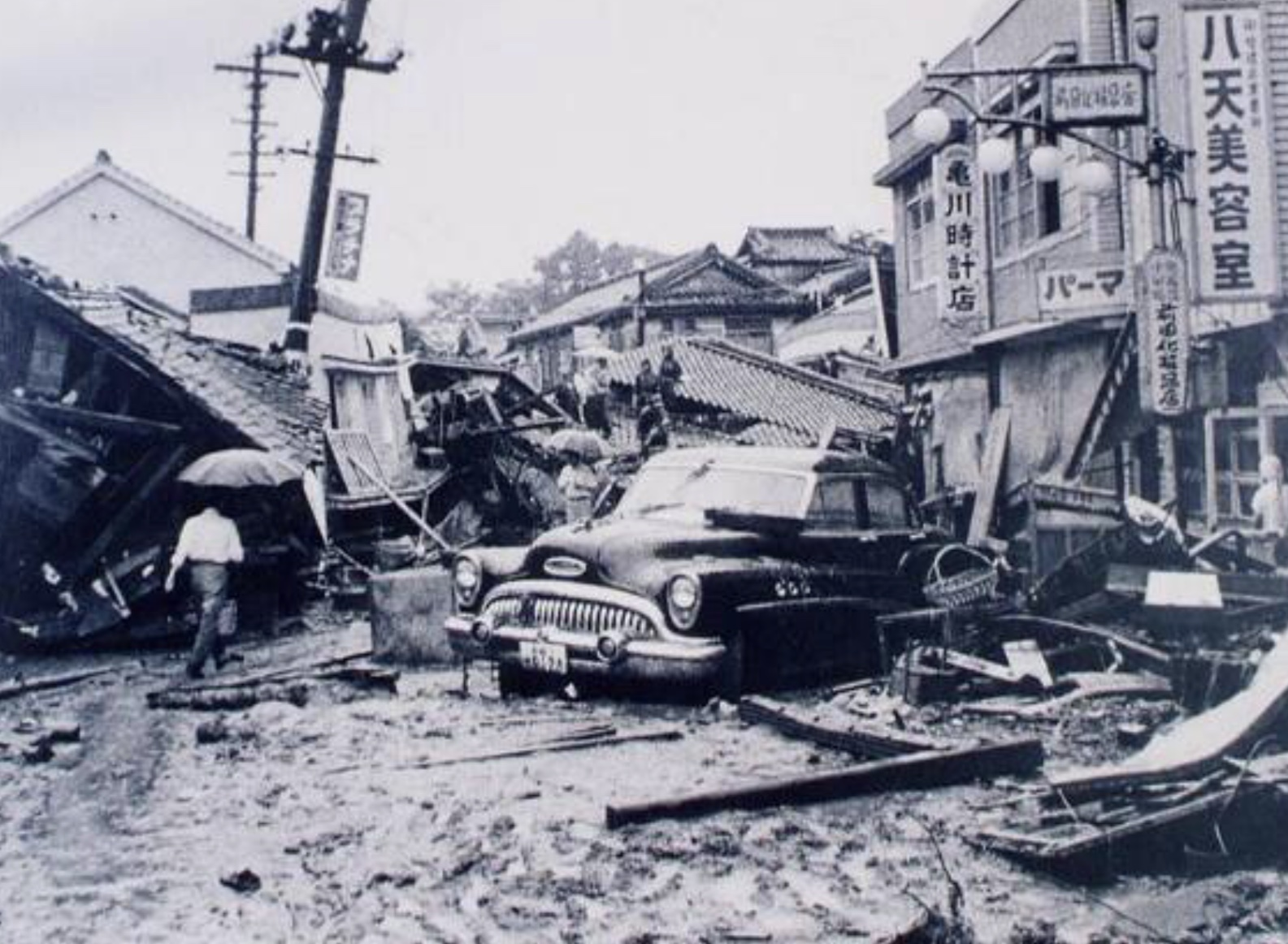
Flood damages

The 1957 Isahaya flood (Japanese: 諫早豪雨) was a series of floods occurring in the northwest part of the Japanese island of Kyushu, in and around Isahaya, Nagasaki Prefecture. Spanning 3 days, from July 25 to July 28, 1957, torrential rain brought floods and landslides to the region. The Ministry of Agriculture, Forestry and Fisheries (at that time) recorded an astonishing 1.109 meters of rain in just one 24-hour period, the highest ever recorded in Japan.

== Flood ==
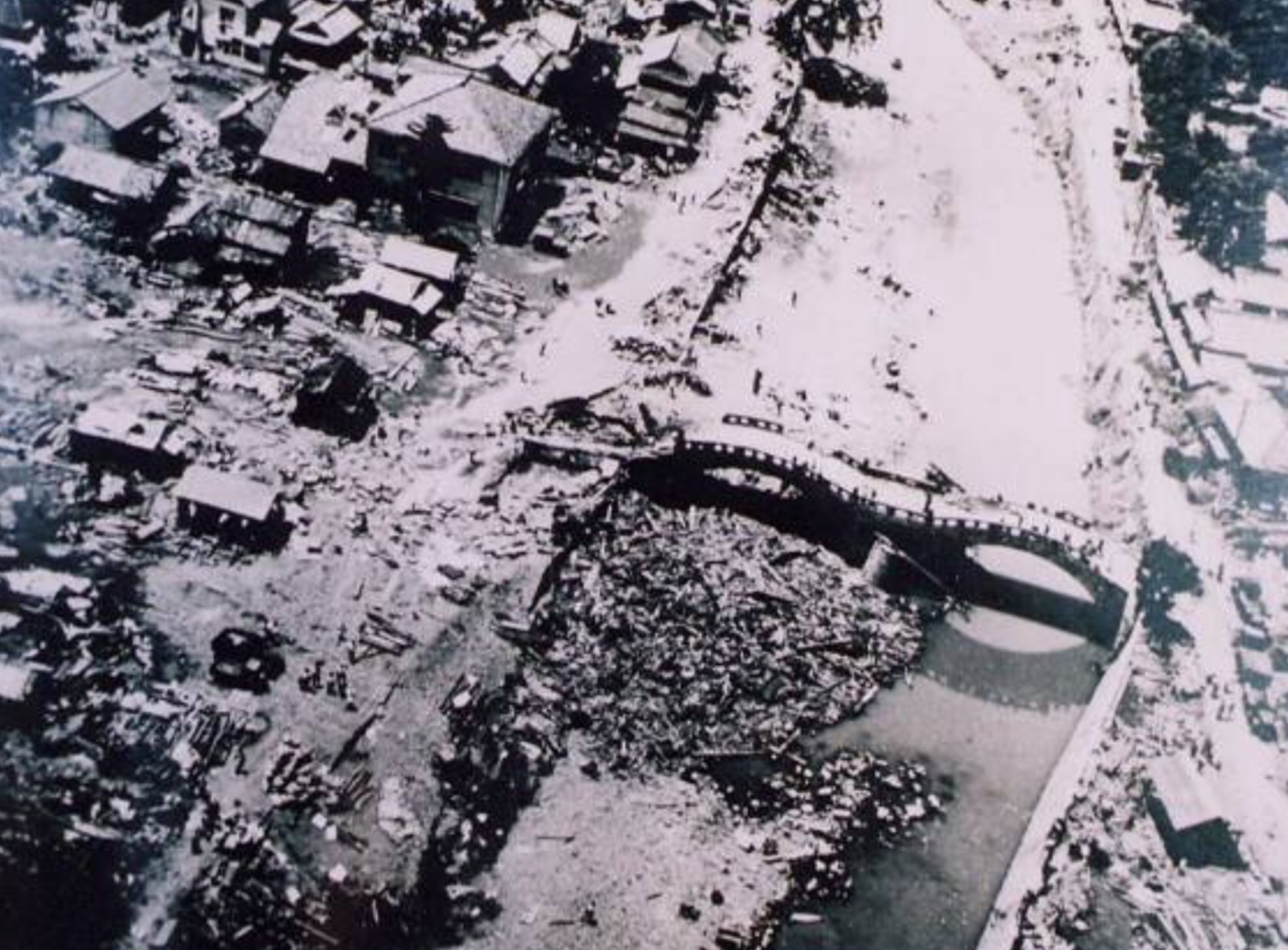
Megane bridge with debris from the 1957 flood.

After July 21, 1957, a high pressure system over the Maritime Province strengthened and the monsoon front moved south. The Baiu front ran from the Kanto coast through southern Kyushu to the southern Yellow Sea on July 24. On the morning of the 25th, a low pressure system formed in the southern Yellow Sea above the front and moved eastward, while the front itself moved northward and became more active. Thereafter, at 3:00 p.m. on the 25th, the monsoon front was mostly stationary in central Nagasaki Prefecture, remaining there until the 26th, bringing record heavy rain accompanied by thunder.

At 2:00 p.m. on July 25, Isahaya City established a flood control headquarters, but by this time sub-floor flooding had occurred in Tobu Kosei Town. At 3 p.m., the Honmeigawa River exceeded the warning water level of 3.50 meters, and an emergency siren was sounded. As the situation became increasingly dire the first evacuation order siren was sounded at 6:50 p.m., and the second evacuation order siren sounded at 7:30 p.m..

At around 8:00 p.m., debris flows were occurring frequently in the upper reaches of the Honmei River, and at around 9:30 p.m., the evacuation order siren was sounded for the third time as the Honmei River overflowed, but power was cut off in the city immediately after, disrupting communication. The heavy rains caused the Honmeigawa River to flood twice in Isahaya City. The second flood, caused by a large-scale debris flow upstream, brought in a large amount of sediment and debris which caused great damage. The muddy torrent hit the Higashi-Eisho-cho area in front of Isahaya Station, broke the levee upstream on the east side of Shimen Bridge, cut through Tenma-cho, and also destroyed the right-bank levee behind Takagi Shrine. Furthermore, debris got caught in the Megane Bridge, built during the 1830s of stone to prevent it from being washed away by floods. It stood, but the debris blocked the escape of floodwaters, causing further damage.

Kumamoto City recorded a daily precipitation of 480.5mm, exceeding the daily precipitation of 411.9mm during the 1953 Shirakawa flood in north Kyushu.

== Deaths ==
In Isahaya City alone more than 500 people died and according to a White Paper on Fire Services, published by the Japanese government to increase public understanding of fire prevention policies, 586 people were killed, 136 people were missing, 3,860 people were injured, 1,564 houses were completely destroyed, 2,802 houses were partially destroyed, 24,046 houses were flooded above the floor level, and 48,519 houses were flooded below the floor level. The Isahaya Flood 30th Anniversary Commemorative Book puts the number of dead and missing at 630 (539 in the Isahaya area, 53 in the Moriyama area, 37 in the Takagi area, and 1 in the Konagai area), and reports also indicate that there were 630 people dead and missing.

== Aftermath ==
Japanese prime minister Nobusuke Kishi flew surveyed the damage from a plane flying over the disaster area and dropped 250000 leaflets with his promise that help was on its way.

The United States donated relief supplies and sent its Air Force to Japan with a mercy airlift of food and clothing for the flood victims.

=== Megane bridge ===
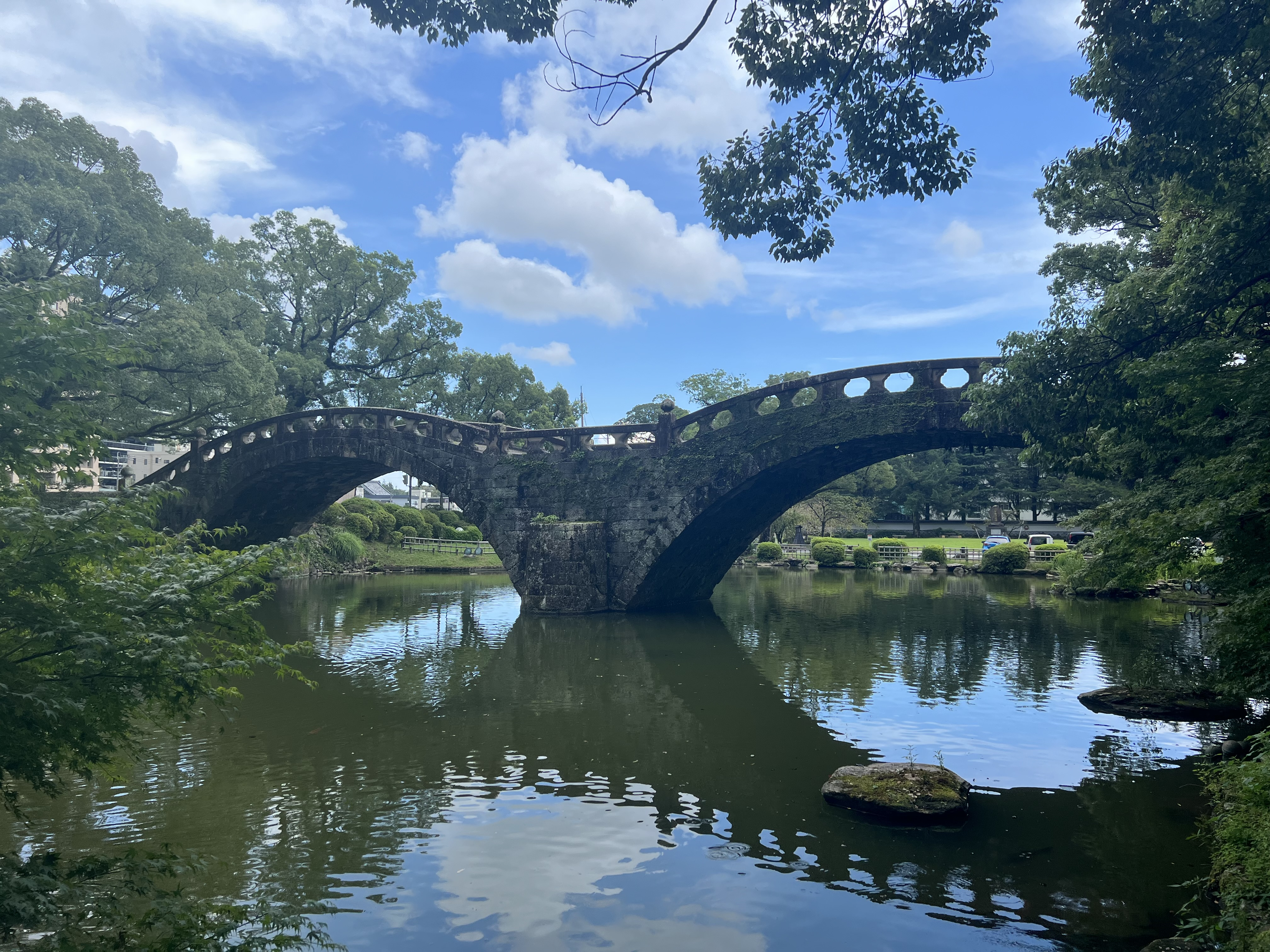
Megane Bridge, a historic stone bridge in Isahaya.

Since Megane bridge had exacerbated the flooding by catching and holding debris, blocking the escape of floodwater, it was decided to blow it up and turn it into rubble for the seawall. However, through the efforts of Mayor Gihei Nomura and others it became, in 1958, the first stone bridge in Japan to be designated an important cultural property. From 1959 to 1960 construction work was carried out to relocate it to Isahaya Park.

=== National Isahaya Bay Reclamation Project ===
In 1989 construction began on the Isahaya Bay Reclamation Project whose purpose is to prevent flood damage caused by heavy rains such as the Isahaya Torrential Rain. A completion ceremony was held in 2007, its disaster prevention effectiveness are yet are unknown. Although the project is the subject of debate, the flooding of the Honmei River, which once occurred every few years, has been reduced. Storm surge damage has disappeared, and Isahaya citizens rate the water level control and flood prevention effects of the reclamation project highly.

=== River festival ===
After the great flood, the Isahaya Manyo River Festival has been held on July 25 every year on the riverbed in the middle reaches of the Honmei River.

== See also ==
- 1953 Northern Kyushu flood
- 1953 Wakayama flood
