= Kobe Bridge =

Steel arch bridge in Kobe, Japan

Kobe Bridge 神戸大橋
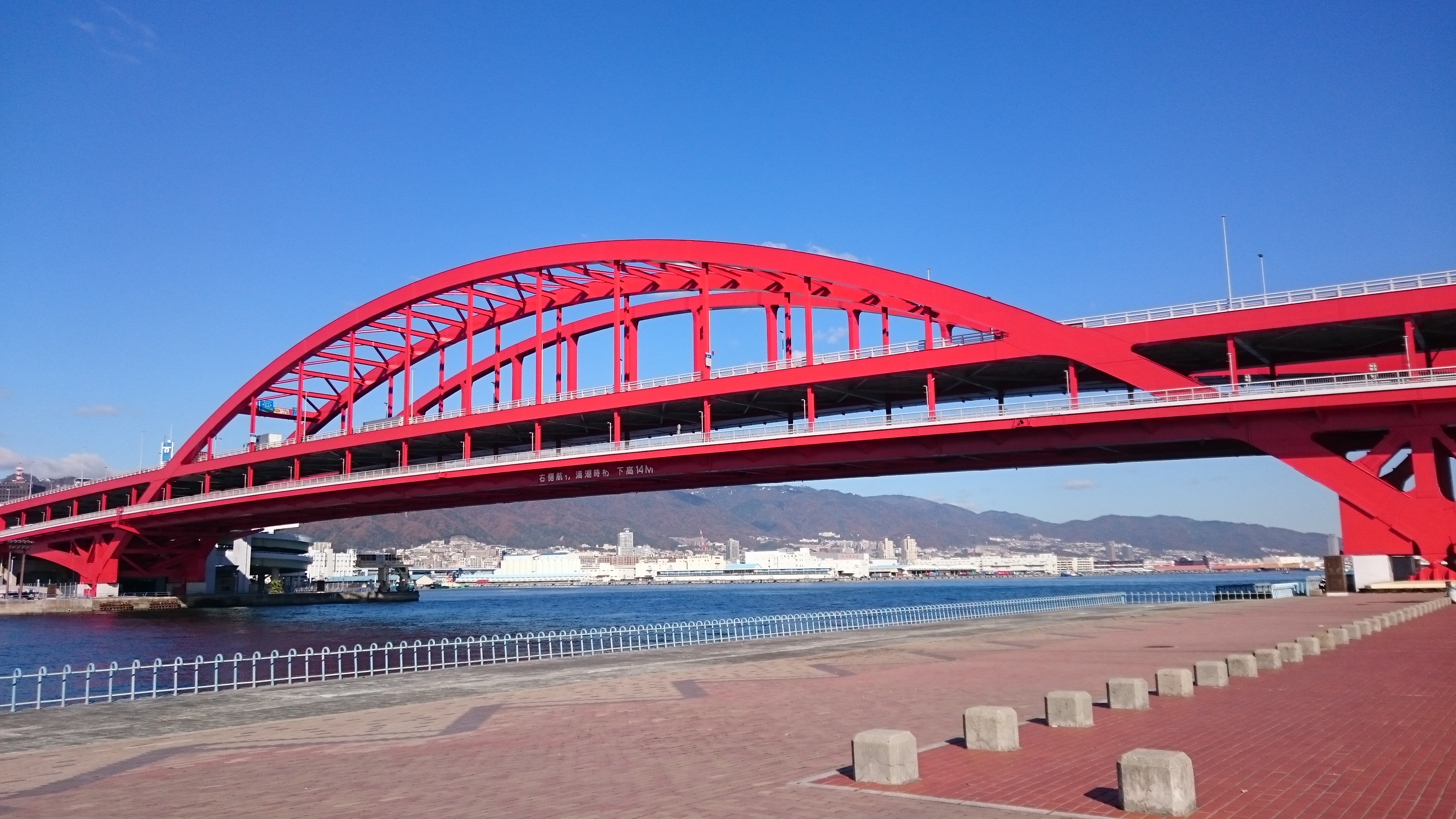
- Kobe Bridge viewed from Port Island
- Coordinates: 34.67899°N 135.20319°E
- Carries: Road traffic and pedestrians
- Crosses: Port of Kobe
- Locale: Kobe, Hyōgo Prefecture, Japan
- Owner: Kobe City
- Heritage status: JSCE Civil Engineering Heritage Site (2022)

Characteristics
- Design: Three-span continuous self-anchored double-deck steel arch bridge
- Material: Steel
- Total length: 319 metres (1,047 ft)
- Longest span: 217 metres (712 ft)
- No. of spans: 3
- No. of lanes: 8 (4 on each level)

History
- Constructed by: Kawasaki Heavy Industries (superstructure); Shimizu Corporation and Kajima Corporation (substructures)
- Construction start: May 1968
- Construction end: March 1970
- Opened: 10 April 1970 (lower deck)

Location
- Location of Kobe Bridge

Kobe Bridge (Japanese: 神戸大橋, Kōbe Ōhashi), also known as Kobe Ohashi Bridge, is a double-deck steel arch bridge in Kobe, Hyōgo Prefecture, Japan. Construction was completed in March 1970, and the bridge spans Kobe Harbour, connecting Shinkō Pier No. 4 on the mainland to the artificial island of Port Island. The bridge is 319 metres (1,047 ft) long, with a central span of 217 metres (712 ft). It carries one-way road traffic on two levels, with the upper deck serving traffic toward Sannomiya and the lower deck serving traffic toward Port Island. The bridge also has a pedestrian walkway.

It was Japan's first double-deck steel arch bridge and was designated a Civil Engineering Heritage Site by the Japan Society of Civil Engineers in 2022, recognising its contribution to the development of the Port of Kobe.

== Design and appearance ==
Kobe Bridge is a three-span continuous, self-anchored steel arch bridge. Its central span measures 217 metres, with two adjoining spans of 51 metres each, giving a total structural length of 319 metres. The bridge is supported by a combination of steel pipe pile and caisson foundations.

Its red steel arches have become a landmark of Kobe Harbour. Repainting work was carried out in 2013 and was reported complete by April 2014, refreshing the bridge's red appearance. A more extensive repainting programme began in 2025, involving the complete removal of existing paint to expose the underlying steel before recoating. The project is expected to be completed in June 2027, at an estimated cost of ¥3 billion.

Kobe Bridge illuminated at night, viewed from Port Island North Park.

The bridge's illumination was redesigned in November 2013 as part of Kobe City's night-time landscape programme. Designed by the Motoko Ishii Design Office, the project aimed to create a new lighting scheme characteristic of the Port of Kobe. Special lighting projects columns of light skywards from the bridge's four corners, during cruise-ship arrivals and departures at night and on designated occasions as part of Kobe City's coordinated landmark illumination programme.

== History ==
=== Construction ===
Kobe Bridge was constructed as part of the development of Port Island, an artificial island built to expand the Port of Kobe. The bridge was designed to provide a road connection between the island and the rest of the city.

Construction began in 1968. The bridge's superstructure was erected by Kawasaki Heavy Industries using large floating cranes and three temporary supporting bents, a method selected to accommodate the short construction schedule and challenging site conditions.

Construction was complicated by obstacles at the site, ground conditions on the recently reclaimed land and the need to connect the bridge's approach roads with the existing passenger terminal. The project also incorporated weathering steel and protective coatings containing micaceous iron oxide.

The bridge was completed in March 1970. An opening ceremony was held on 10 April 1970, initially opening the four lanes of the lower deck to traffic.

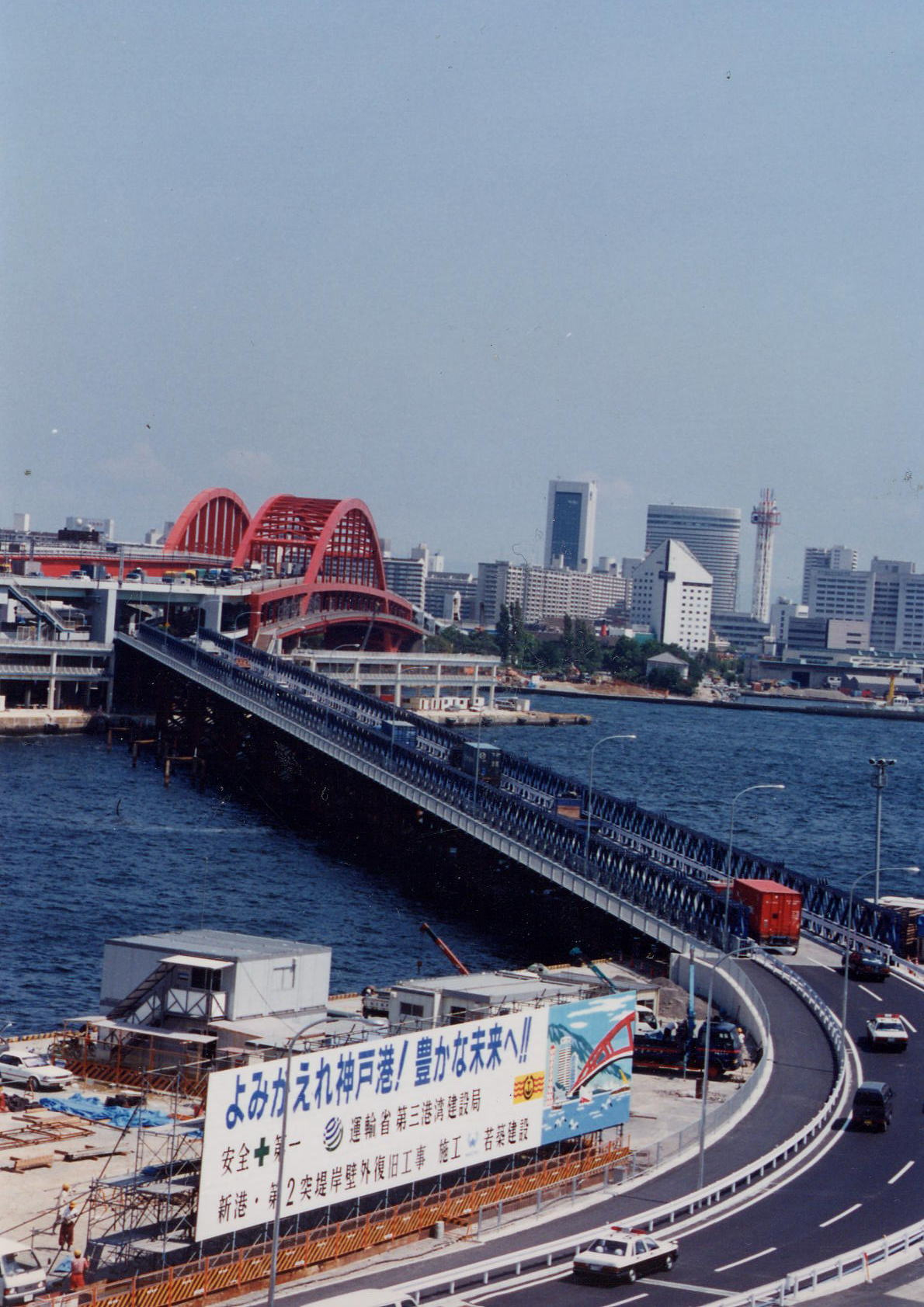
Temporary bridge connecting Kobe Bridge to Shinkō Pier No. 3 following the 1995 earthquake.

=== 1995 Kobe earthquake ===
On 17 January 1995, Kobe Bridge was damaged during the Kobe earthquake. The earthquake caused significant movement of the bridge's foundations: a later investigation finding the top of a caisson foundation to have been displaced towards the sea by approximately 0.6–0.8 metres.

The earthquake also damaged the bridge's approach roads, disrupting road access. A temporary connection opened on 1 August 1995 while restoration work took place. The bridge returned to full service on 4 July 1996.

=== Recognition ===
Kobe Bridge received the 1970 Tanaka Award in the works category from the Japan Society of Civil Engineers. In 2022, the society designated the bridge a Civil Engineering Heritage Site, recognising its significance as Japan's first double-deck steel arch bridge and its contribution to the development of the Port of Kobe.

== In popular culture ==
Kobe Bridge was the model for the fictional Fuyuki Bridge in the Fate/stay night franchise, appearing in works including the anime series Fate/Zero. It appears in several battle scenes and has become a destination for fans visiting places associated with the series. In 2020, the Kobe Tourism Bureau included the bridge in a promotional campaign for the film Fate/stay night: Heaven's Feel III. spring song, as an augmented-reality location and in commemorative artwork.

The bridge was also used as a location for the 2019 Japanese film Leaving the Scene, directed by Yutaka Mizutani.

== See also ==
- Higashi Kobe Bridge
- Port Island Line
- List of bridges in Japan
