= Teleport Bridge =

Bridge in Tokyo, Japan

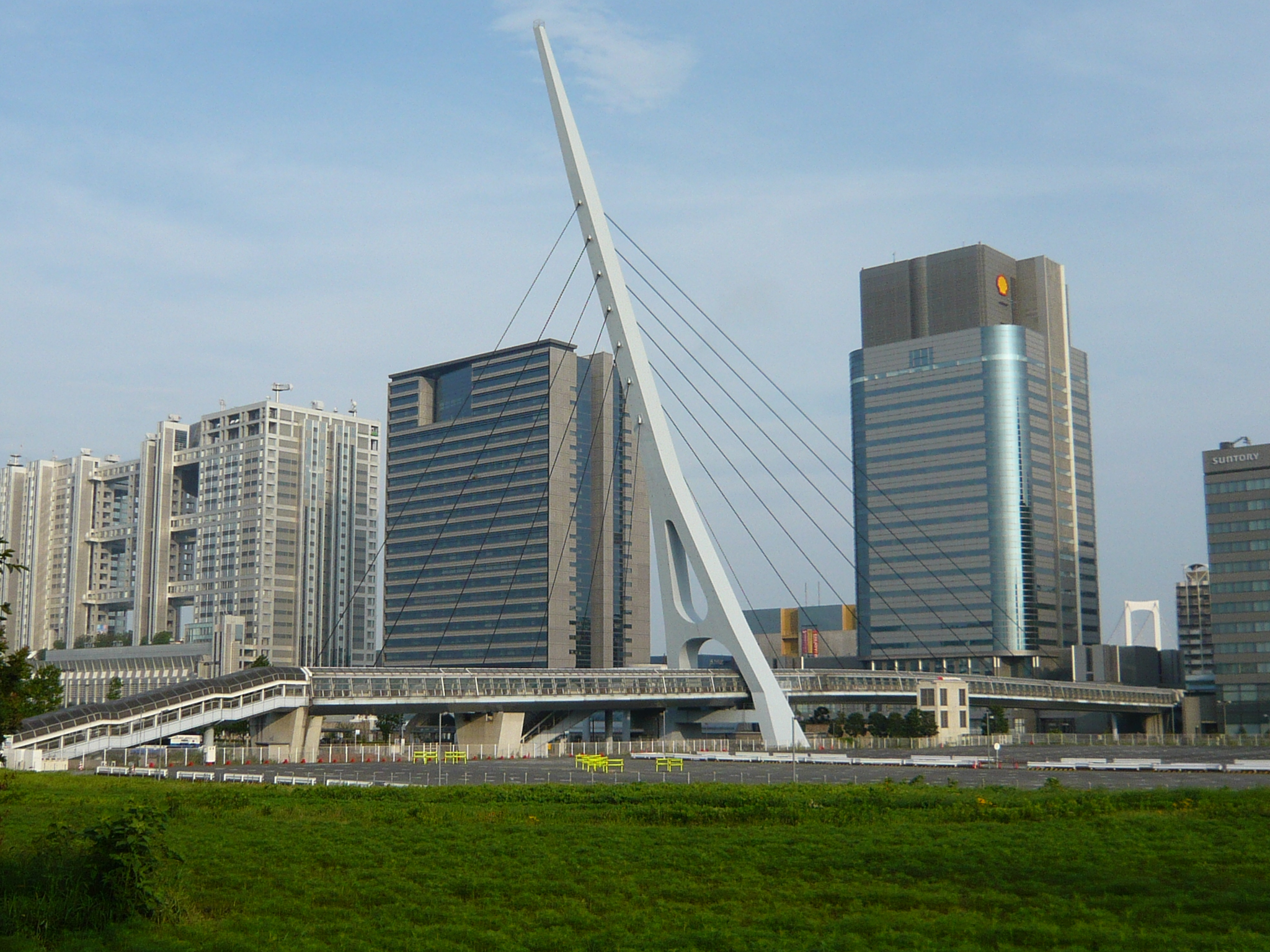
- The bridge in 2007
- Coordinates: 35°37′42″N 139°46′44″E
- Locale: Tokyo, Japan

Location
- Interactive map of Teleport Bridge

The Teleport Bridge (Japanese: テレポートブリッジ) is a pedestrian-only bridge in Odaiba, located adjacent to the Tokyo Teleport Station. It connects the Aomi and Daiba areas of Tokyo, Japan.

== See also ==
- List of bridges in Japan
