= 1982 Nagasaki flood =

Natural disaster in Japan

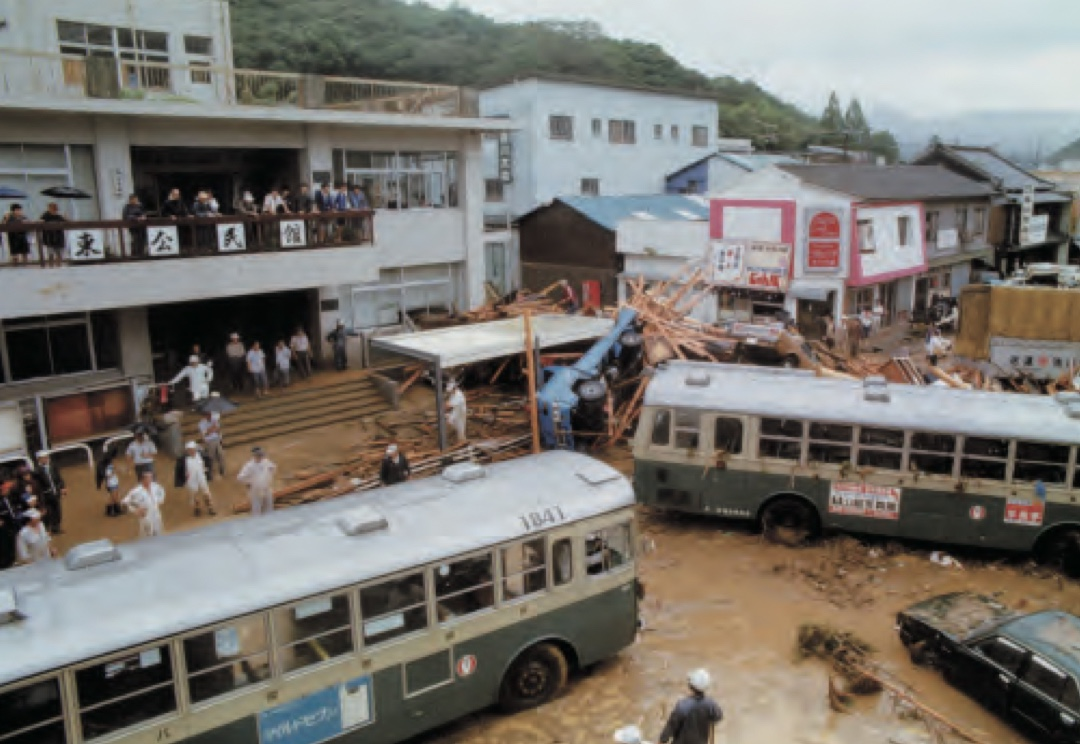
Flood damage

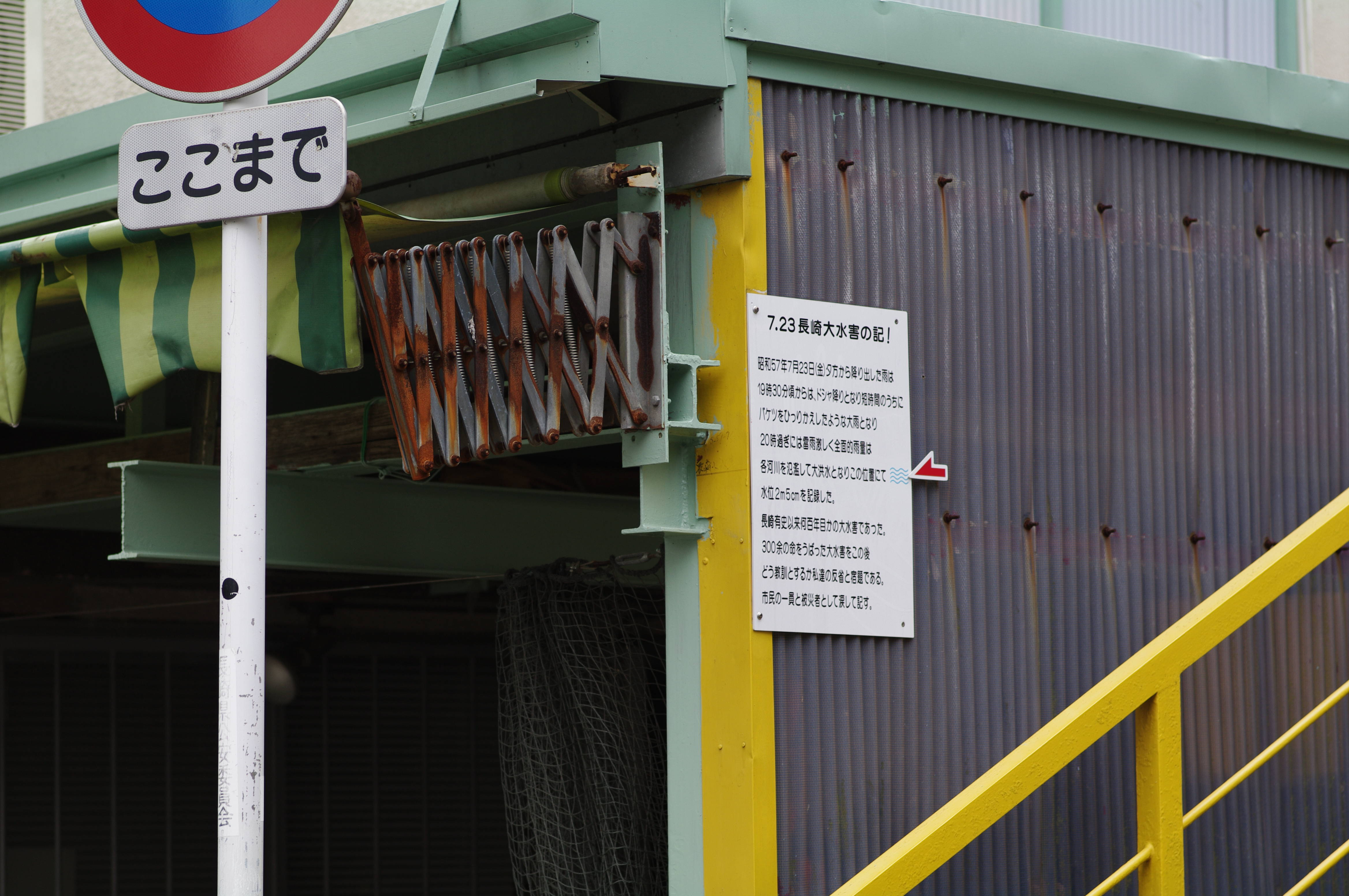
The flood caused the water to rise to a height of 2.05 m above the surface.

The 1982 Nagasaki flood (Japanese: 長崎大水害) was caused by a cloudburst that occurred mainly in Nagasaki, Japan in July 1982.

== Overview ==
On July 23, 1982, due to the influence of the Meiyu front, a cloudburst occurred around Nagasaki. Due to this cloudburst, mudflows and rivers overflowed their banks in quick succession.

Throughout the Nagasaki area, following rainfall observed at 100 to 187 mm a per hour, as well as landslides throughout the area. According to the Japanese government report, 299 people died in Nagasaki Prefecture, along with 23 in Kumamoto Prefecture.

The Japan Meteorological Agency named the heavy rain from July 23 to July 25 the "July 1982 heavy rain" (昭和57年7月豪雨). On the other hand, Nagasaki Prefecture named this disaster the "7.23 Nagasaki Flood" (7.23長崎大水害).

== See also ==
- 1957 Isahaya flood
