= Meiko Nishi Ohashi roadway bridges =

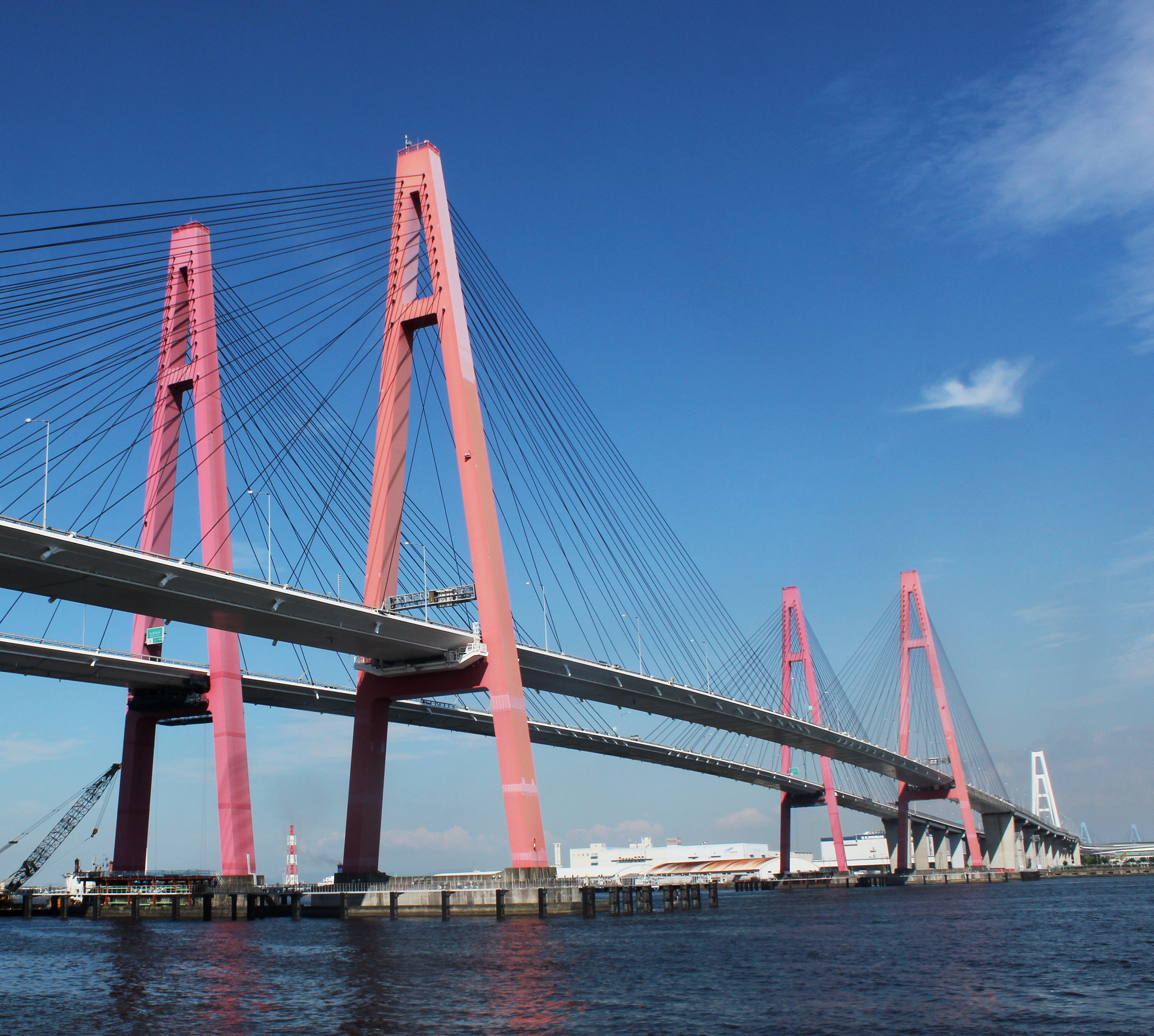
- Coordinates: 35.051843°N 136.834545°E
- Crosses: Port of Nagoya
- Locale: Nagoya

Characteristics
- Design: semi-fan cable-stayed bridges with continuous steel-box girder decks and A-frame pylons
- Material: Steel
- Total length: approximately 758 metres (2,487 ft) (both)
- Height: 122 metres (400 ft) (pylons)
- Longest span: 406 metres (1,332 ft) (1985 bridge); 405 metres (1,329 ft) (1997 bridge)
- No. of spans: 3 each
- Piers in water: 2 each

History
- Opened: 1985 (1st); 1997 (2nd)

Location
- Interactive map of Meiko Nishi Ohashi roadway bridges

The Meiko Nishi Ohashi roadway bridges (名港西大橋) are two cable-stayed bridges, completed in 1985 and 1997, crossing the Port of Nagoya in Japan. Their pylons are A-shaped and painted bright red.

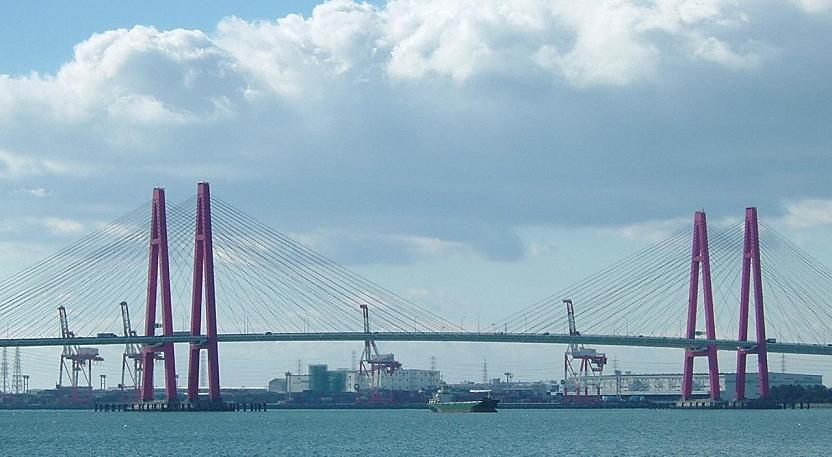
Meiko Nishi Bridges from a distance

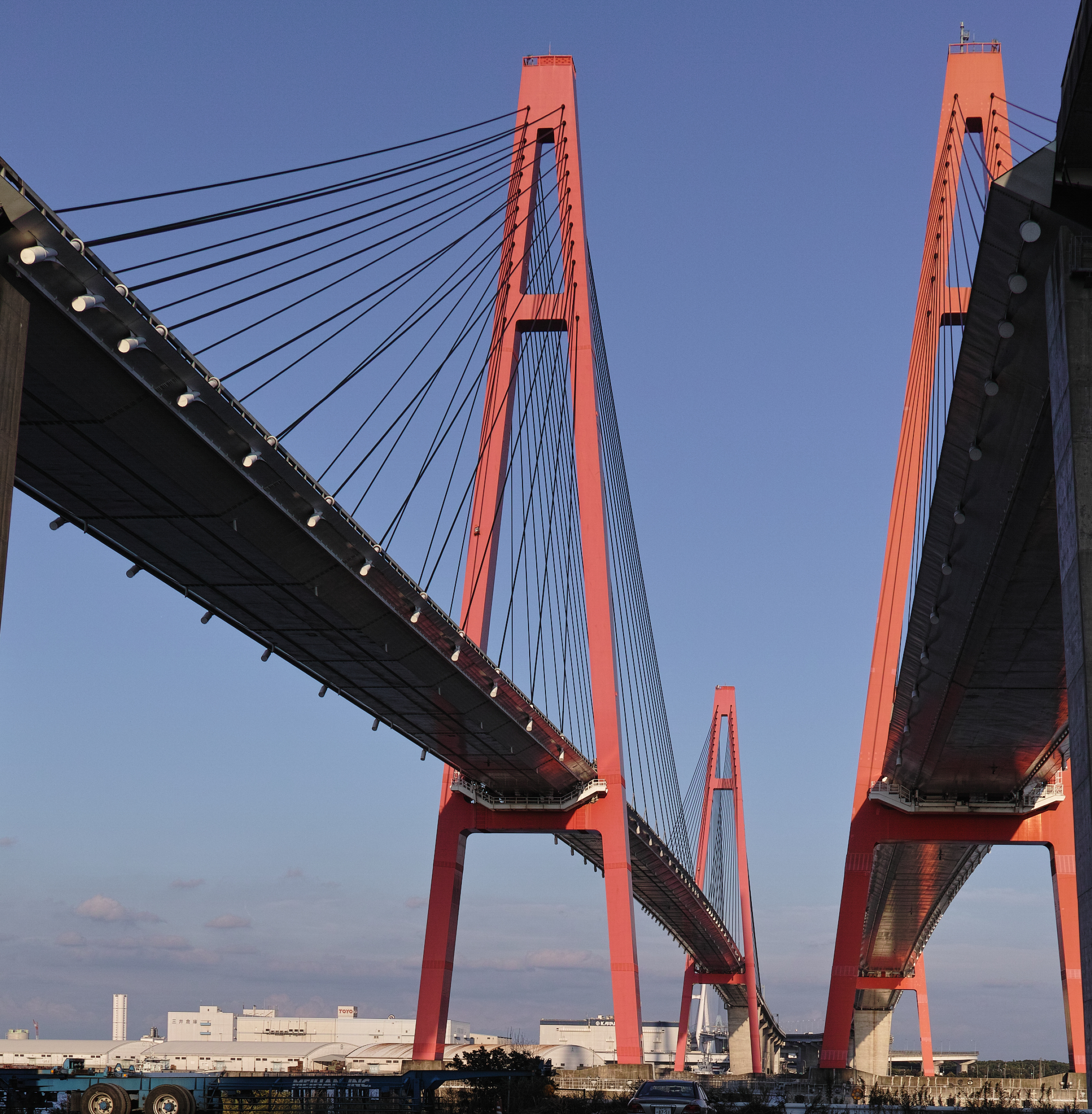
Under the bridges

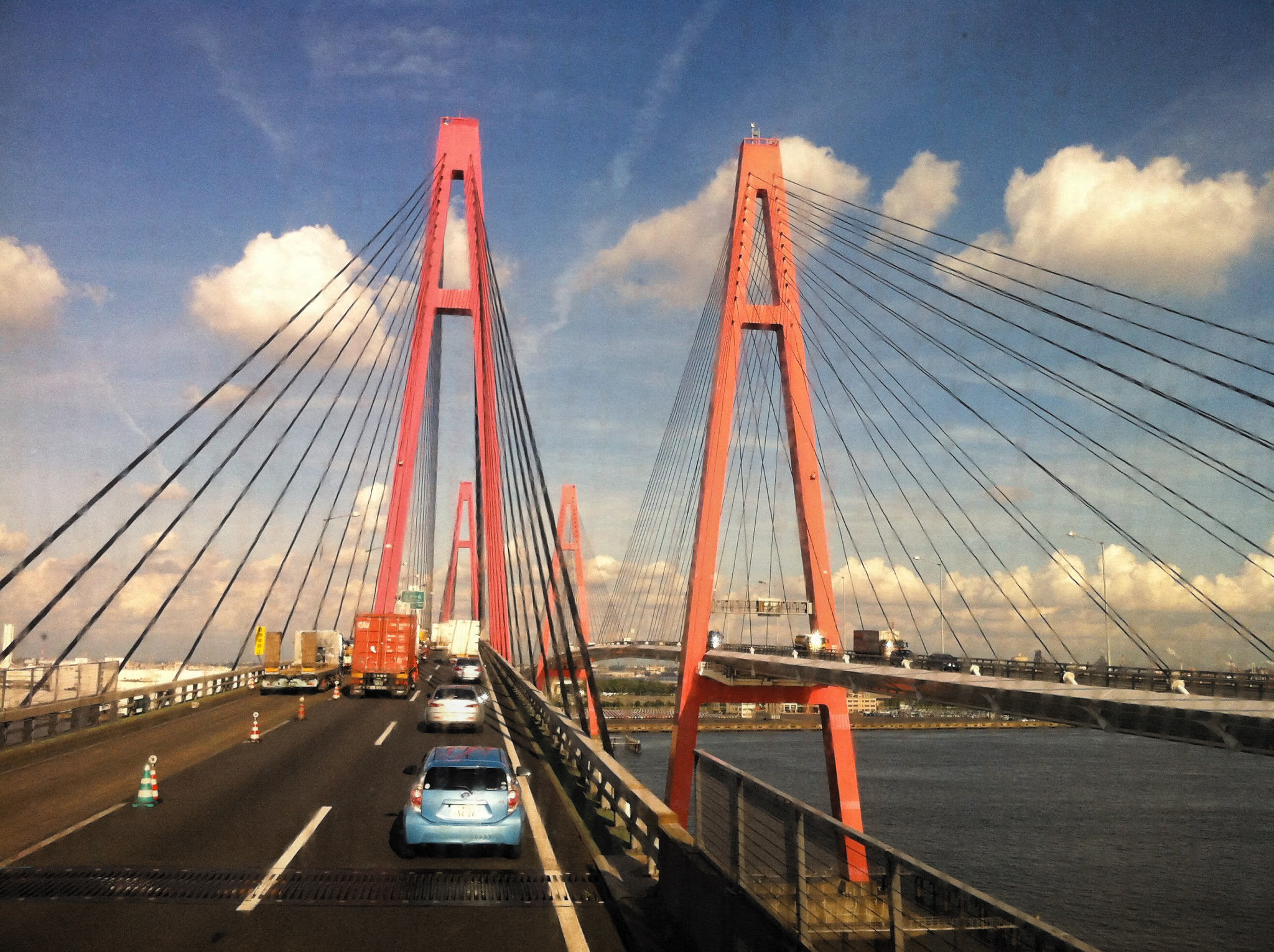
Driving on the bridges

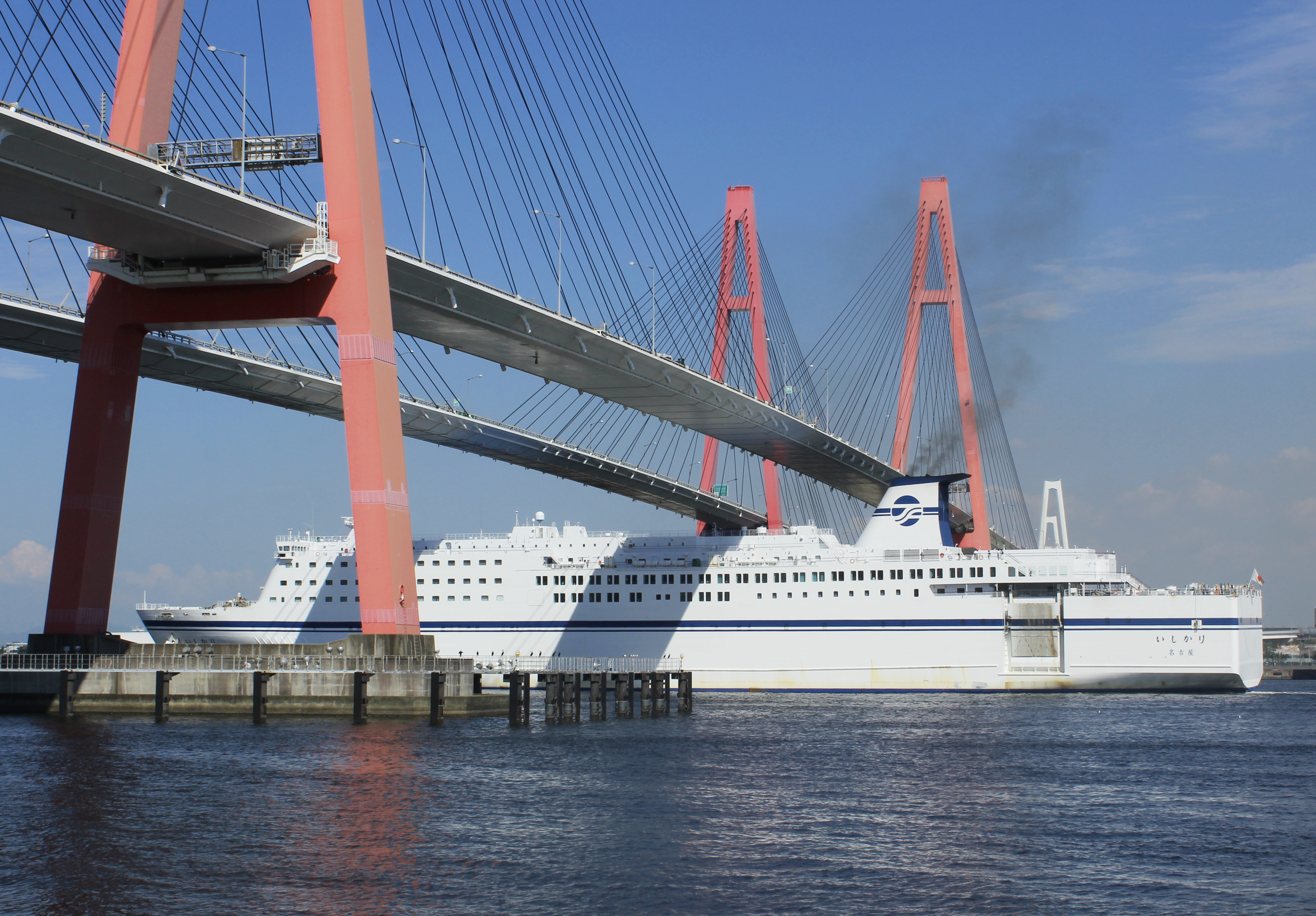
Ship crossing under the bridges
