= Megane Bridge =

Japanese stone arch bridge in Nagasaki

Coordinates: 32°44′50″N 129°52′48″E

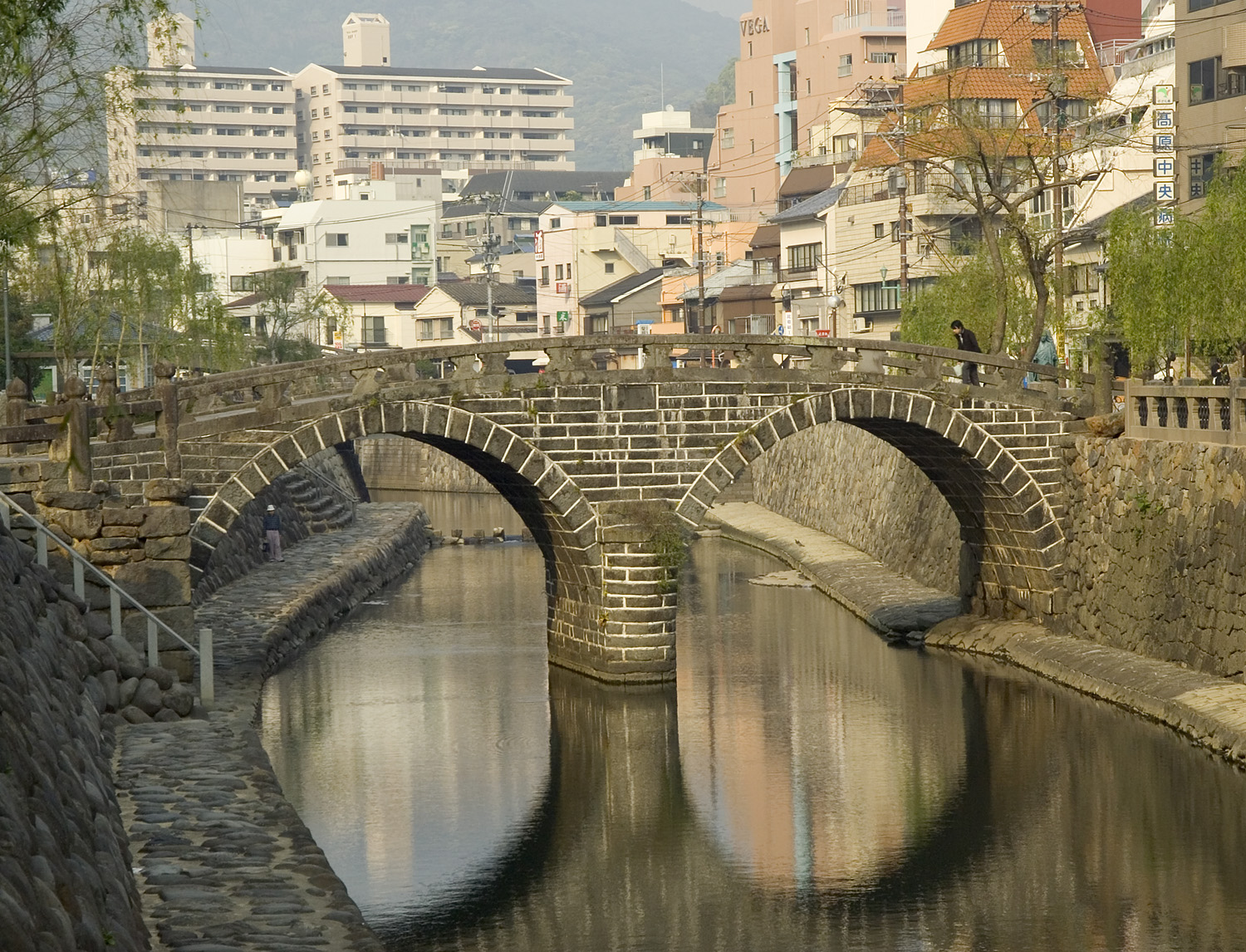
Meganebashi

Map

Meganebashi (眼鏡橋) or Spectacles Bridge, over the Nakashima River (中島川) was built in Nagasaki in 1634 by the Chinese monk Mokusunyoujo who was in the second generation of Chinese monks living at Kofukuji Temple.

== Bridge ==
It is said to be the oldest stone arch bridge in Japan along with Edo's Nihonbashi bridge and Iwakuni's Kintaikyou bridge and has been designated as an Important Cultural Property. Megane Bridge is also part of the first group of bridges built over Nakashima river. Megane Bridge is made of stone and is a double arch bridge. It received the nickname "Spectacles Bridge" because its two arches and their reflection in the water create the image of a pair of spectacles. Vehicles are prohibited from crossing the bridge and is strictly prohibited to pedestrians only. On July 23, 1982, a disastrous deluge washed away six of the ten stone bridges over the Nakashima River. Meganebashi was badly damaged but almost all the original stones were retrieved and the bridge was restored to its original appearance. As well as being damaged in a flood in 1982 another flood in 1647 destroyed Megane Bridge but was rebuilt the following year in 1648 by Koumu Hirado.

There is a similar but larger "Spectacles Bridge" in Isahaya Park.

Near Megane Bridge are 20 heart shaped stone within the bridge's embankment from which you can make a wish for eternal love. It is also said that the more heart shaped stones you find the luckier you will be.
