= List of bridges in Kyoto =

These are some, but not all of the bridges of the City of Kyoto:

- Misono-bashi (御薗橋)35°03′26″N 135°45′04″E
- Kamigamo Bridge
- Nakagamo-bashi
- Idzumoji-bashi
- Aoi-bashi
- Kojin-bashi
- Marutamachi-bashi
- Ebisugawa-bashi
- Nijo-hashi
- Sanjō Ōhashi
- Shijō Ōhashi
- Matsubara-hashi
- Gojo Bridge
- Shomen-bashi
- Shichijo-hashi
- Shiokoji-bashi
