= Shiwaku Islands =

Archipelago in the Seto Inland Sea, Japan

Coordinates: 34°22′15.34″N 133°37′7.73″E

The Shiwaku Islands (塩飽諸島, Shiwaku-shotō) or Shiwaku-jima (塩飽島) are an archipelago in the Seto Inland Sea, between the larger Japanese islands of Honshu and Shikoku.

The group is part of Kagawa Prefecture and consists of 28 islands of various sizes. To the northwest, in Okayama Prefecture lie the Kasaoka Islands. The name derives from shioyaku (塩焼く) or shiowaku (潮湧く) both meaning boiling seawater to get salt. However, the name may also refer to rough water created by the confluence of tides that mix around the islands.

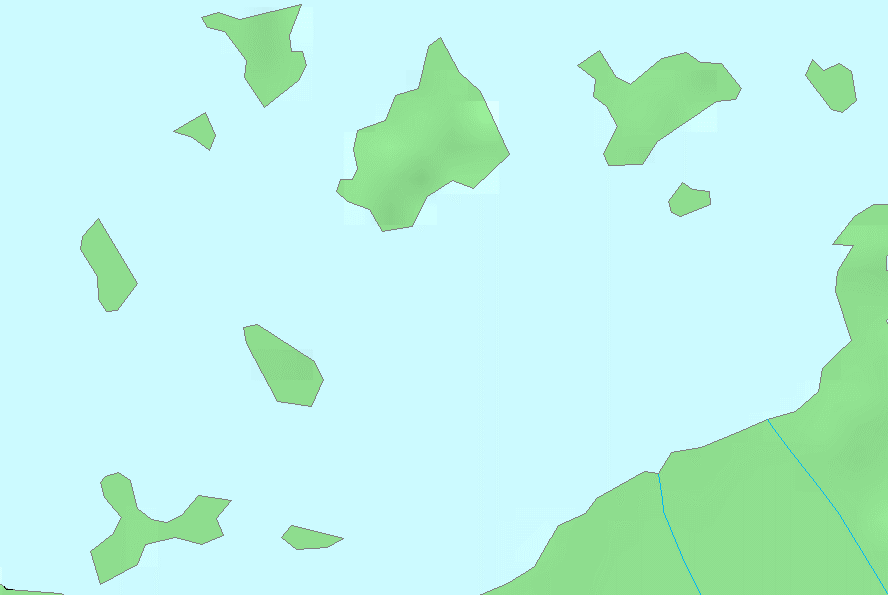

== History ==
Since ancient times, the islands have been an important point for maritime transport.

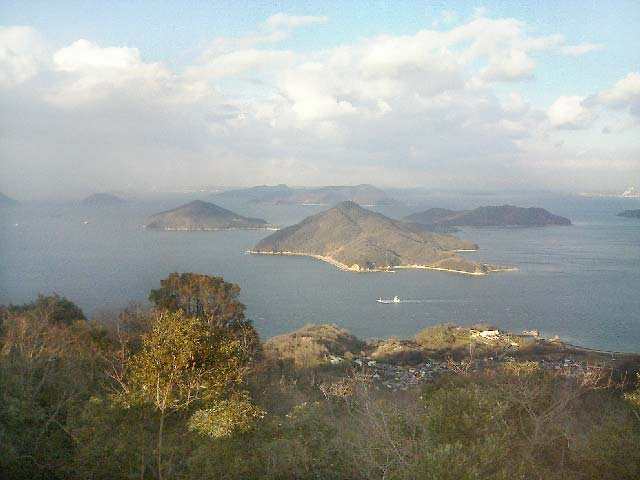
Shiwaku Islands

== Islands ==
=== Awashima ===
粟島, part of Mitoyo, populated. In Meiji 30 (1897), the National Mercantile Marine School was established here and subsequently many talented men were sent into the shipping industry.

=== Bentenjima ===
弁天島, part of Marugame, unpopulated.

=== Budojima ===
歩渡島, This island is connected to Hitsuishi-jima. The name (歩 = walk, 渡 = cross) derives from the fact that it is possible to cross between the islands.

=== [Sanuki] Hiroshima ===
広島, part of Marugame and one of the seven "salt boiling islands". area: 11.66 km², circumference: 18.5 km. Hiroshima is the largest of the Shiwaku Islands and is sometimes called Sanuki-Hiroshima to differentiate it from Hiroshima Prefecture on the main Japanese island Honshu. The China Sea Directory from 1873 contains a description of the island and recommends Enoura Bay (referred to as Ino Ura) as an anchorage:

‘The outline of Hiroshima is very irregular, and its sharp rocky ridges are very conspicuous. The summit of the island, which presents southward the appearance of an almost perpendicular cliff, is 990 feet above the sea. On the south shore is Ino Ura, a small bay, on the shores of which are several small villages, the valleys around which are cultivated. The eastern hills are covered with brushwood, but the western ridges are thickly wooded. In the ravines, the sides of which are rocky precipices, numerous deer are found.

Ino Ura is a convenient anchorage for vessels passing through the Seto Inland Sea, and is generally chosen as a night anchorage, especially when bound from Hiogo to the westward, it being within convenient distance, and can be arrived at before nightfall. Care must be taken not to approach the shore too closely, as the head of the bay shoals very suddenly but good holding ground will be found here out of the strength of the tides.’

On the island is the grave of Frank Toovey Lake, a Victorian sailor who died here in 1868 while part of Richard Henry Brunton's survey party.

=== Hitsuishijima ===
櫃石島, The island takes its name from a megalith in the shape of a chest (jap: 櫃) at its southern part. area: 0.85 km², circumference: 5.4 km, part of Sakaide.

The principal industry on the island is collection of shellfish by diving and trawl fishing.

In mid January the yearly peach festival is held on the compounds of the Ōji-Shrine (王子神社, Ōji-jinja)

=== Honjima ===
本島, part of Marugame, situated in the center of the Shiwaku Island group. area: 6.74 km², circumference: 16.4 km. It is still the most populous place within the Shiwaku Islands.

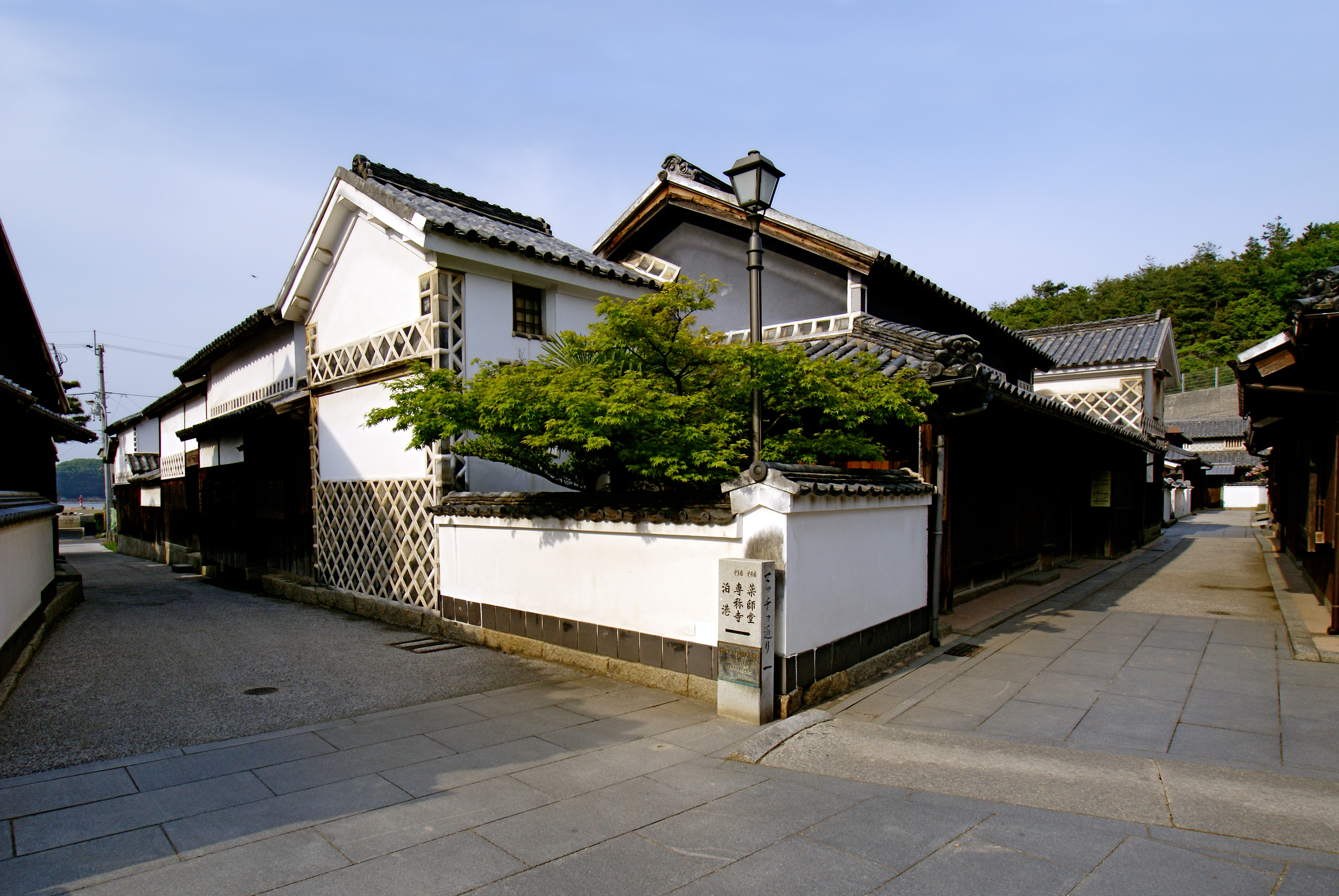
Kasa-jima (笠島)

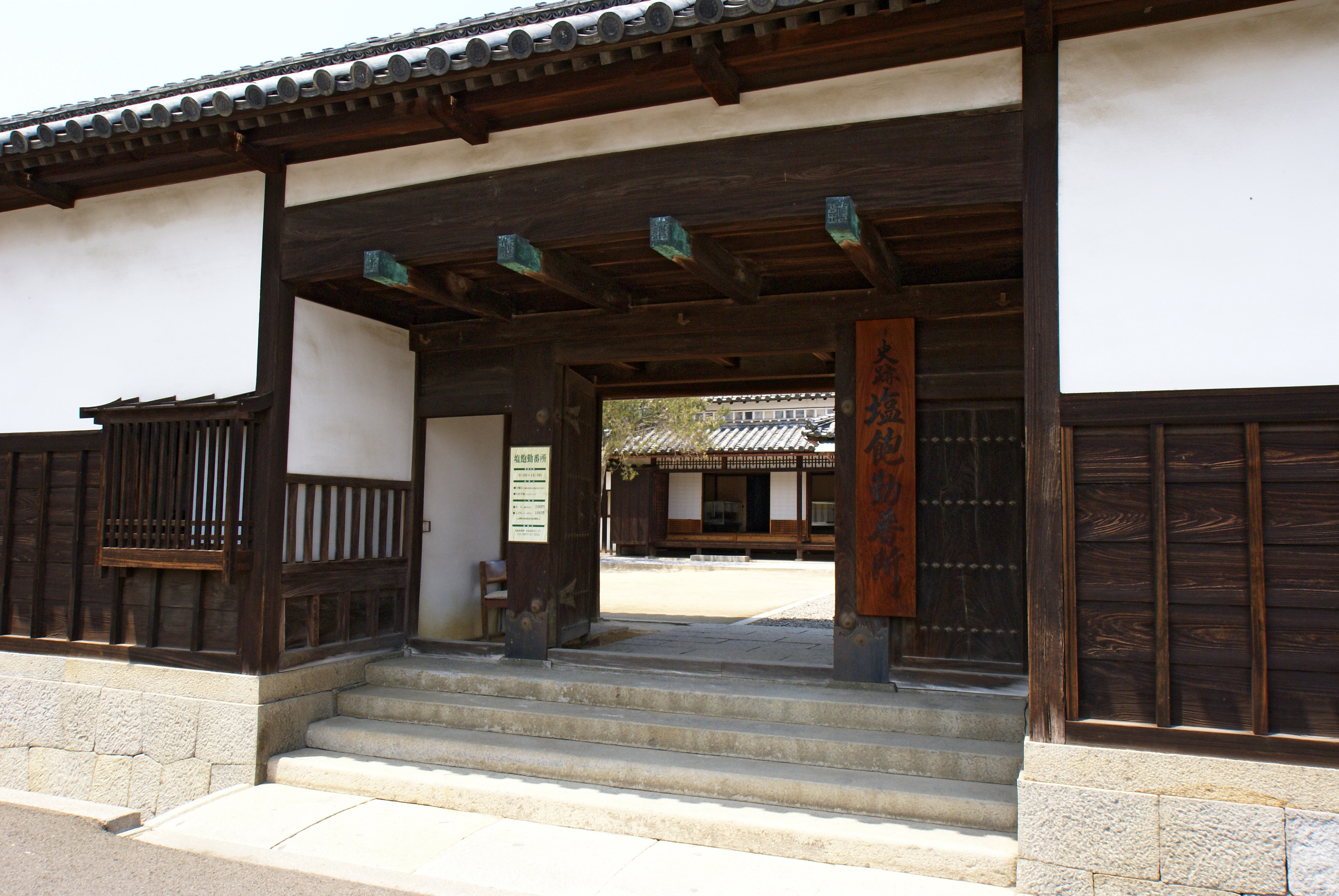
Shiwaku-kinbansho (塩飽勤番所)

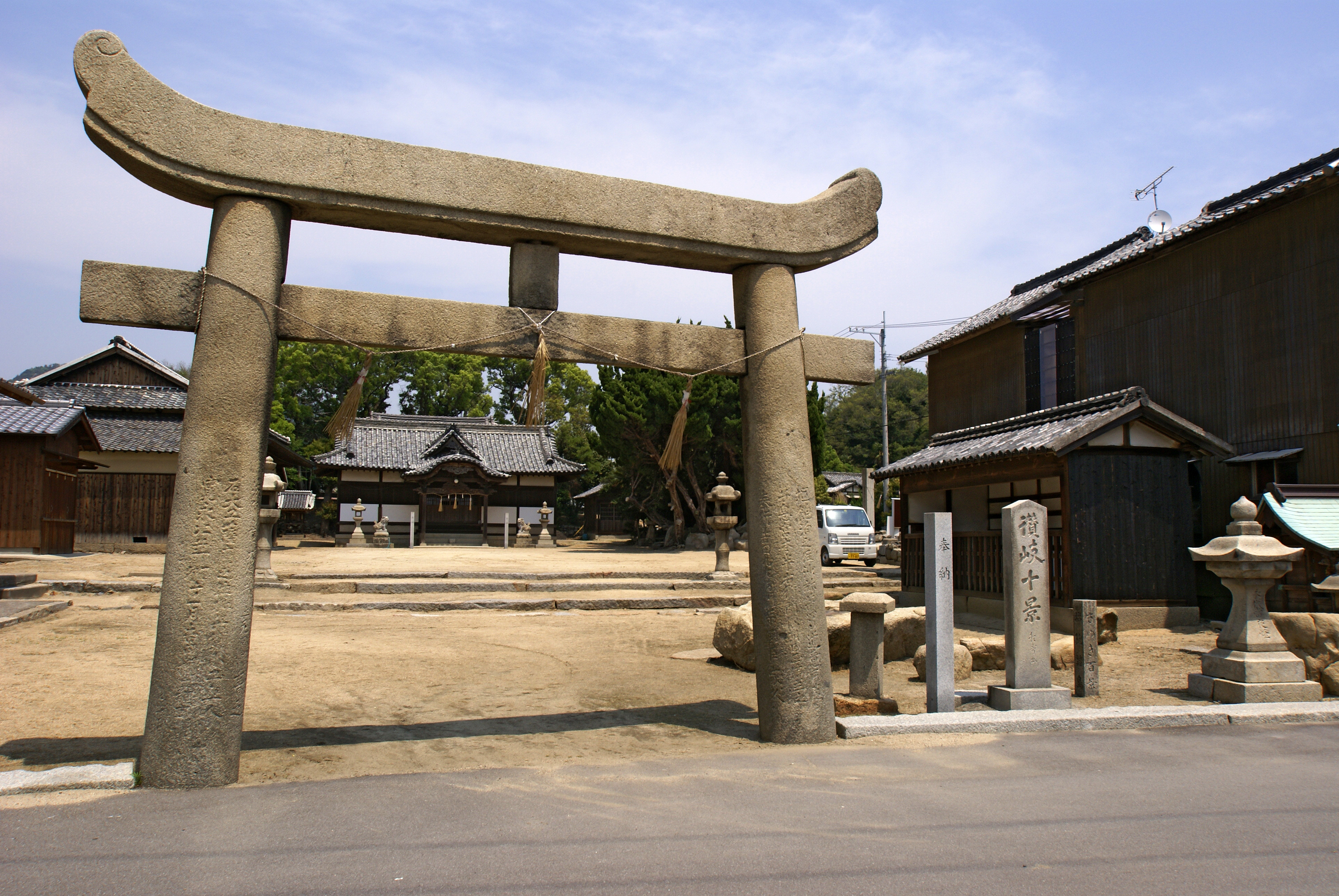
Kogarasu-jinja (木烏神社)

==== Famous places and historic spots ====
Kasajima (笠島) - designated as Preservation District of Groups of Traditional Buildings (重要伝統的建造物群保存地区) of Japan

  - preservation centre of stores and houses on the street ((真木邸))
  - contact house ((小栗邸))
  - document house ((藤井邸))
  - Senshō Temple (専称寺, Senshō-ji) - 年寄り吉田彦右衛門の墓は日本国指定の史跡（史跡「塩飽勤番所」の附指定）
  - Kasajima castle ruins - historical landmark of Kagawa prefecture
  - Chōtoku Temple (長徳寺, Chōtoku-ji) - wooden sedentary statues of Amitābha, Sakyamuni, an image of Yōryū-Kannon (楊柳観音), 500-year-old Japanese Ternstroemia (Ternstroemia gymnanthera) tree, roof tiles from the Tenbun era inscribed with letters and pictures which have been designated as cultural asset of Marugame
  - Anoe Shrine (尾上神社, Anoe-jinja)
  - (笠島港)
- Shiwaku guard house (塩飽勤番所, Shiwaku-kinbansho) - build in 1798, reconstructed in 1862, historical site of Japan
- (千歳座) - small theater built in 1862, situated on the grounds of the Kogarasu Shrine (木烏神社, Kogarasu-jinja)
- Shōgaku Temple (正覚院, Shōgaku-in) - The wooden statue of Kannon boddisattva, the Acala statue, Vaisravana statue and the line carved Jūichimen Kannon mirror image are all Important Cultural Properties of Japan.
- Tōkō Temple (東光寺, Tōkō-ji) - The wooden sedentary statue of the Bhaisajyaguru Buddha is an important cultural property of Japan.
- (夫婦倉) - designated Cultural Property of the city, double warehouse constructed at the end of the Edo period.
- Honjima Tomari swimming area - designated by the Ministry of the Environment as one of the 100 pleasant bathing areas, specially selected part of the island
- Mizumiiro Primary School (水見色小学校, Mizumiiro Shōgakkō) - location for the movie Kikansha Sensei (機関車先生)
- Tomari harbour (泊港, Tomari-kō)

=== Iwakurojima ===
岩黒島, part of Sakaide, Kagawa, populated. The Great Seto Bridge passes across this island. area: 0.16 km², circumference: 1.6 km.

The Iwakurojima Interchange on the down-line (away from Tokyo) of the Seto-Chuo Expressway can be used exclusively by islanders by means of a card to unlock the gate.

There is also an emergency phone. Tourists and other people can use an elevator from the bus stop on top of the bridge to access the island.

=== Kamimashima ===
上真島, part of Marugame, unpopulated.

=== Karashima ===
唐島, part of Mitoyo, unpopulated.

=== Karasugojima ===
烏小島, part of Marugame, unpopulated.

=== Kohadakajima ===
小裸島, part of Sakaide, unpopulated.

=== Koseijima ===
小瀬居島, part of Sakaide, unpopulated.

=== Koyoshima ===
小与島, part of Sakaide, populated. area: 0.24 km², circumference: 1.3 km.

=== Mitsugojima ===
三つ子島, part of Sakaide, unpopulated. The Great Seto Bridge passes across this island.

=== Murokijima ===
室木島, part of Sakaide, unpopulated.

=== Nabeshima ===
鍋島, part of Sakaide, unpopulated. The island is connected to Yoshima via a mole. In 1872 a lighthouse constructed by Richard Henry Brunton was erected on the island. The lighthouse is now unused and is open to the public generally once a year. However, it is possible to reach the lighthouse and view the exterior.

=== Nagashima ===
長島, part of Marugame, unpopulated.

=== Nizurajima ===
二面島, part of Sakaide, unpopulated.

=== Ōhadakajima ===
大裸島, part of Sakaide, unpopulated.

=== Oteshima ===
小手島, part of Marugame. Popular place for catching Japanese amberjack or Sand lance (Ammodytes personatus).area: 0.6 km², circumference: 3.8 km.

=== Sanagishima ===
佐柳島, part of Tadotsu. area: 1.83 km², circumference: 6.6 km.

=== Seijima ===
瀬居島,

=== Shamijima ===
沙弥島. Due to land reclamation of the Sakaide Bannosu (番の州) industrial area in December 1967, the island became connected to the adjacent land. Adjoining, the island services the Seto Ohashi Memorial Park. In summer the island is crowded by guests who come to bathe in the sea. From the Jōmon period on, a salt making culture developed. At Nakanda beach (ナカンダ浜, Nakanda-hama) earthenware and other finds from that time have been excavated.

The Man'yōshū poet Kakinomoto no Hitomaro paid a visit to the island and composed a tanka and tanka appendage. According to the novelist Nakagawa Yoichi (中河与一) from Sakaide, Kakinomoto no Hitomaro had a temple/monument erected on Nakanda beach which in 1936 was moved to its present location on Osogoe beach (オソゴエの浜) at (人麻呂岩).

On 9 April 2005 the Kagawa Prefectural Higashiyama Kaii Art Museum, housing the collection of Kaii Higashiyama was opened.

=== Shimomashima ===
下真島, part of Marugame, unpopulated.

=== Shiraishi ===
白石, part of Marugame, unpopulated.

=== Shishijima ===
志々島, part of Mitoyo. area: 0.74 km², circumference: 3.4 km.

=== Takamijima ===
高見島, part of Tadotsu, populated. area: 2.33 km², circumference: 6.4 km.

=== Teshima ===
手島, part of Marugame, populated. area: 3.41 km², circumference: 10.9 km.

=== Ushijima ===
牛島, part of Marugame, populated. One of seven islands on which salt is extracted from seawater. area: 0.7 km², circumference: 4.2 km.

=== Wasashima ===
羽佐島, part of Sakaide, unpopulated.

=== Yoshima ===
与島, part of Sakaide and one of the seven "salt boiling islands".

- area: 1.10 km², circumference: 6.9 km.

The island is crossed by the Great Seto Bridge and a rest area ("Yoshima parking area") has been built along the highway.

There are in total two parking lots at the rest area. From there the harbour Yoshima-kō (与島港) in the northern part of the island can be reached. At Yoshima-kō there is a Fisherman's Wharf with restaurants and places selling seafood and souvenirs. It is also possible to go with the Japanese warship Kanrin Maru on a sightseeing pleasure cruise of the Great Seto Bridge.

Public-transit buses and authorized islanders can access the island road 274, "Yoshima line", via a personal card. Non-islanders with car may only get as far as the two parking lots as the gate is closed for them. The southern part of the island can be reached by public bus.
