= Isahaya Park =

Park in Isahaya, Nagasaki Prefecture, Japan

Coordinates: 32.844977°N 130.047827°E

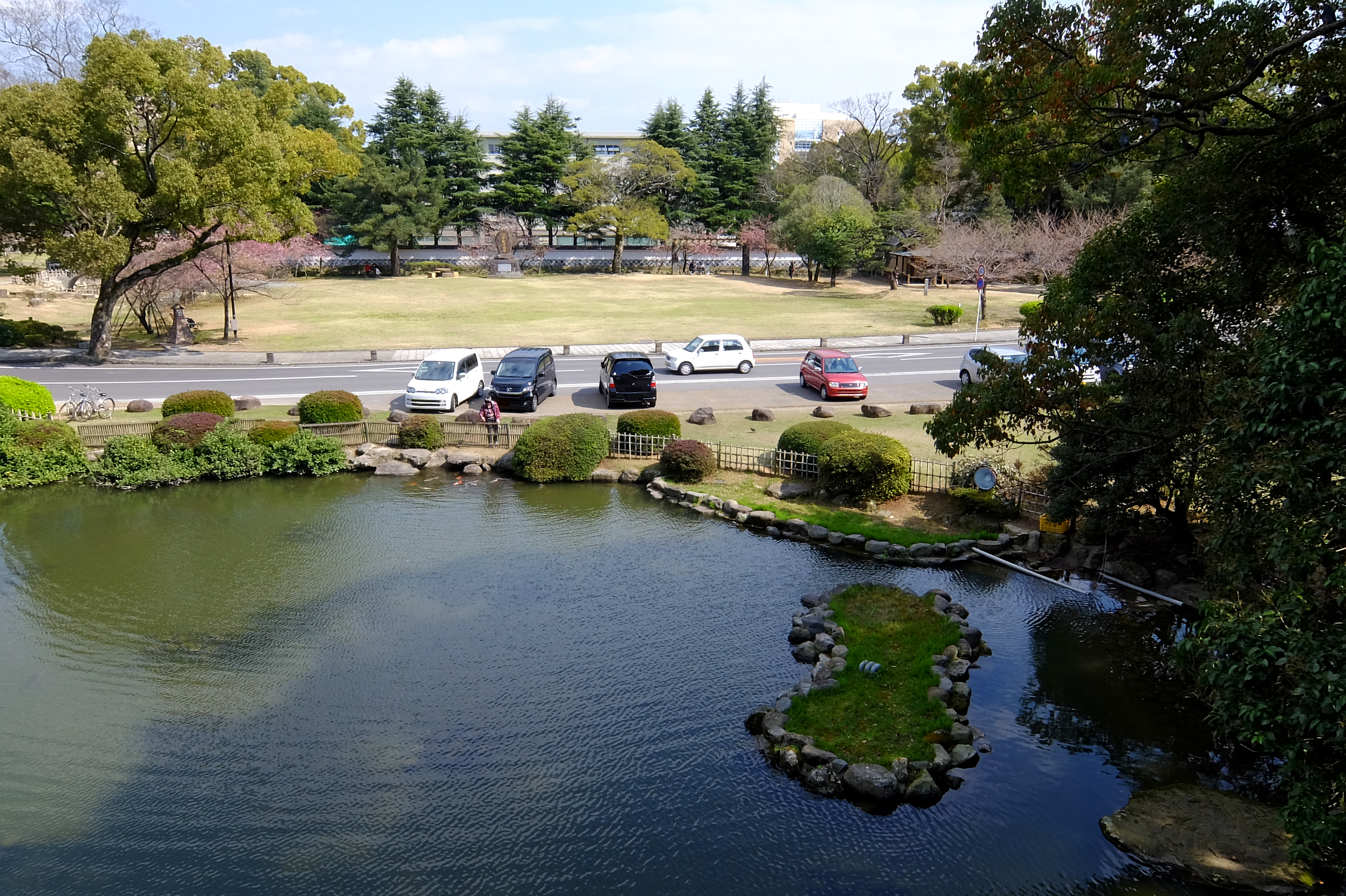
Isahaya Park in Isahaya, Nagasaki prefecture, Japan

Isahaya Park (also known as Azalea Park) is in Isahaya in Nagasaki Prefecture, Japan. It was built on the ruins of Isahaya castle (also known as Takashiro) during the Taishō period. The park is famous for its azalea blooms, and the "Azalea Festival" is held here, on and around April 10 every year. The park is also known for its "Spectacles Bridge" (see below) over the pond. The park is about 50 minutes by bus from Nagasaki city.

== Meganebashi ==
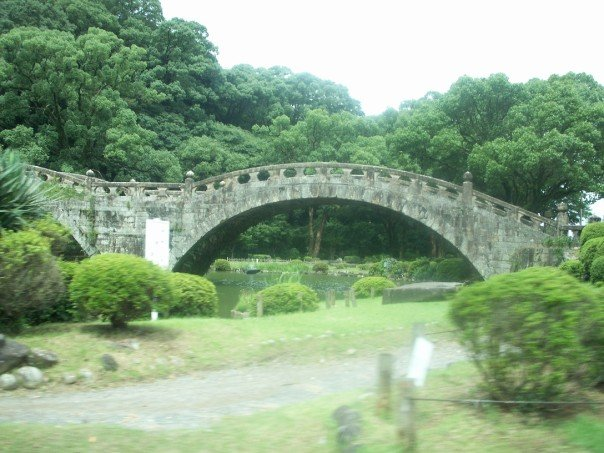

Meganebashi or "Spectacles Bridge" (眼鏡橋) is a double arch stone bridge spanning a pond in the park. The bridge is twice the size of the famous "Spectacles Bridge" in Nagasaki city. The bridge was originally built over the Honmyo river in 1839. After the flood of 1957, it was relocated to the park. Every year on the anniversary of the flood, the city of Isahaya has a festival at the original location of the bridge. It was designated as an Important Cultural Property in 1958.
