= Higashi Kobe Bridge =

Higashi Kobe Bridge 東神戸大橋
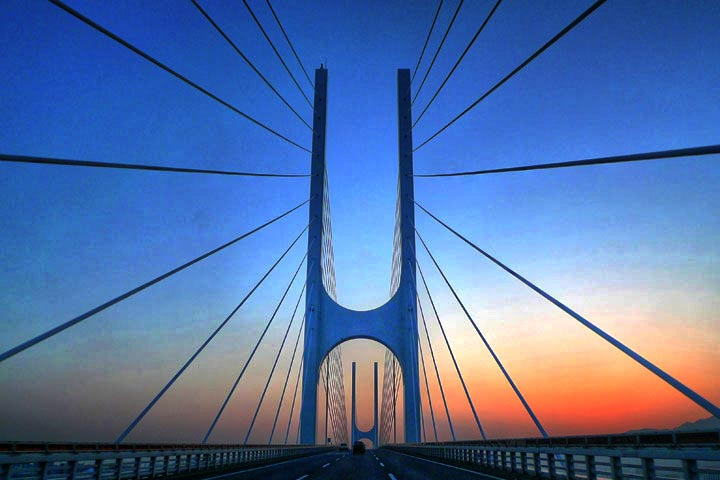
- Coordinates: 34°42′33″N 135°17′32″E
- Carries: Hanshin Expressway 5 Bayshore Route
- Crosses: Kobe Bay
- Locale: Kobe / Osaka, Japan
- Maintained by: Hanshin Expressway Company

Characteristics
- Design: Cable-stayed, Warren truss bridge
- Total length: 1,800 m (5,906 ft)(1.8 km)
- Width: 20 m (66 ft)
- Height: 168 m (551 ft)
- Longest span: 485 m (1,591 ft)
- Load limit: Two(Double)-Decker Bridge
- Clearance below: 32 m (105 ft)

History
- Opened: 1992 Location of the Bridge

The Higashi Kobe Bridge (東神戸大橋, Higashi Kōbe Ōhashi) is a cable-stayed bridge in Kobe, Japan, which opened in 1992. It has a main span of 485 meters and spans a waterway between two artificial islands in Osaka Bay. The bridge is a part of the Hanshin Expressway, which also is cradled by the Tempozan Higashi Bridge, downstream of the Higashi Kobe Bridge. The bridge is also a part of the Bayshore route 5 expressway of Kobe, which is also a part of the Industrial Ring Road of Kobe. The bridge carries two decks of roadway (3 lanes on each deck) (6 in total), and the bridge is 168 meters high and the maximum clearance is 32 meters to the water. The bridge was built by the Hanshin Expressway Public Corporation.

== See also ==
- List of longest cable-stayed bridge spans
