= Kokufu, Gifu =

Dissolved municipality in Gifu prefecture, Japan

Map of Kokufu, Gifu

Kokufu (国府町, Kokufu-chō) was a town located in Yoshiki District, Gifu Prefecture, Japan.

As of 2003, the town had an estimated population of 8,064 and a population density of 90.56 persons per km^{2}. The total area was 89.05 km^{2}.

On February 1, 2005, Kokufu, along with the town of Kuguno, and the villages of Asahi, Kiyomi, Miya, Nyūkawa, Shōkawa and Takane (all from Ōno District), and the village of Kamitakara (also from Yoshiki District), was merged into the expanded city of Takayama and no longer exists as an independent municipality.
