= Takane, Gifu =

Dissolved municipality in Gifu prefecture, Japan

Map of Takane, Gifu

Takane (高根村, Takane-mura) was a village located in Ōno District, Gifu, Japan.

As of 2003, the village had an estimated population of 780 and a population density of 3.53 persons per km^{2}. The total area was 220.66 km^{2}.

On February 1, 2005, Takane, along with the town of Kuguno, and the villages of Asahi, Kiyomi, Miya, Nyūkawa and Shōkawa (all from Ōno District), the town of Kokufu, and the village of Kamitakara (both from Yoshiki District), was merged into the expanded city of Takayama and no longer exists as an independent municipality.

The village was once located in Mashita District (~April 1, 1950). Along with the village of Asahi, the village was transferred to Ōno District on April 1, 1950.
