= Shōkawa, Gifu =

Dissolved municipality in Gifu prefecture, Japan

Map of Shōkawa, Gifu

Shōkawa (荘川村, Shōkawa-mura) was a village located in Ōno District, Gifu Prefecture, Japan.

As of 2003, the village had an estimated population of 1,359 and a population density of 4.20 persons per km^{2}. The total area was 323.28 km^{2}.

On February 1, 2005, Shōkawa, along with the town of Kuguno, and the villages of Asahi, Kiyomi, Miya, Nyūkawa and Takane (all from Ōno District), the town of Kokufu, and the village of Kamitakara (both from Yoshiki District), was merged into the expanded city of Takayama and no longer exists as an independent municipality.

In Fall, the village puts on Japan's longest lion dance festival (Renjishi - 連獅子).

During the building of the Miboro dam, a portion of the village was submerged. One of the village's oldest cherry trees, which was threatened by the dam project, was transplanted to an area alongside the dam made lake.

Though it is merely a pit stop on the way to Shirakawa or Takayama, it boasts an onsen.

In 1999, a prehistoric reptile, Shokawa ikoi, was discovered and named after the town.

== Climate ==
Shōkawa, including parts of Takasu-cho have a humid continental climate (Köppen climate classification Dfb), with four distinct seasons.

Some of the coldest settlements of mainland Japan (Honshu) can be found on this plateau, with a climate similar to that of Hokkaido, boasting an average of 10 metres snowfall throughout the winter season and giving rise to a selection of ski resorts and winter activities.

Climate data for Shōkawa, Gifu (1981～2010)
Month	Jan	Feb	Mar	Apr	May	Jun	Jul	Aug	Sep	Oct	Nov	Dec	Year
Mean daily maximum °C (°F)	−0.2 (31.6)	0.7 (33.3)	4.6 (40.3)	12.1 (53.8)	17.8 (64.0)	21.2 (70.2)	24.7 (76.5)	26.1 (79.0)	21.6 (70.9)	15.6 (60.1)	9.5 (49.1)	3.0 (37.4)	13.0 (55.4)
Daily mean °C (°F)	−5.3 (22.5)	−4.9 (23.2)	−1.1 (30.0)	5.2 (41.4)	10.9 (51.6)	15.4 (59.7)	19.4 (66.9)	20.3 (68.5)	16.1 (61.0)	9.2 (48.6)	3.1 (37.6)	−2.3 (27.9)	7.2 (45.0)
Mean daily minimum °C (°F)	−11.7 (10.9)	−12.3 (9.9)	−7.5 (18.5)	−1.8 (28.8)	3.5 (38.3)	9.6 (49.3)	14.7 (58.5)	15.5 (59.9)	11.3 (52.3)	3.4 (38.1)	−2.6 (27.3)	−8.0 (17.6)	1.2 (34.2)
Average precipitation mm (inches)	152.0 (5.98)	135.4 (5.33)	173.4 (6.83)	175.9 (6.93)	221.2 (8.71)	262.4 (10.33)	331.8 (13.06)	233.6 (9.20)	324.6 (12.78)	165.4 (6.51)	143.8 (5.66)	137.1 (5.40)	2,439.3 (96.04)
Mean monthly sunshine hours	75.8	103.3	149.6	181.6	185.1	143.2	138.2	155.6	117.0	128.3	102.3	81.7	1,563.7
Source: Japan Meteorological Agency
