= Nyūkawa, Gifu =

Dissolved municipality in Gifu prefecture, Japan

Map of Nyūkawa, Gifu

Nyūkawa (丹生川村, Nyūkawa-mura) was a village located in Ōno District, Gifu, Japan.

== Population ==
As of 2003, the village had an estimated population of 4,684 and a population density of 20.62 persons per km^{2}. The total area was 227.15 km^{2}.

== Merge ==
On February 1, 2005, Nyūkawa, along with the town of Kuguno, and the villages of Asahi, Kiyomi, Miya, Shōkawa and Takane (all from Ōno District), the town of Kokufu, and the village of Kamitakara (both from Yoshiki District), was merged into the expanded city of Takayama and no longer exists as an independent municipality.
