= Kuguno, Gifu =

Dissolved municipality in Gifu prefecture, Japan

Map of Kuguno, Gifu

Kuguno (久々野町, Kuguno-chō) was a town located in Ōno District, Gifu Prefecture, Japan.

As of 2003, the town had an estimated population of 4,077 and a population density of 38.43 persons per km^{2}. The total area was 106.10 km^{2}.

On February 1, 2005, Kuguno, along with the villages of Asahi, Kiyomi, Miya, Nyūkawa, Shōkawa and Takane (all from Ōno District), the town of Kokufu, and the village of Kamitakara (both from Yoshiki District), was merged into the expanded city of Takayama and no longer exists as an independent municipality.

Kuguno is further broken into several wards each holding its own events throughout the year.

== Economy ==
Primary Industry- Agriculture- Tomatoes, Apples, Peaches Secondary Industries- Forestry (several small lumber mills), Tourism (Michi no Eki, Arukopia Ski Hill, Mini golf, Apple/Peach picking).

== Education ==
Nursery School (age 3–5), Elementary School (age 6–11), Junior High School (age 12–14)

== Government ==
Prior to February 1, 2005 Kuguno was an independent town in the district of Ono, but has since merged with the City of Takayama.

== Religion ==
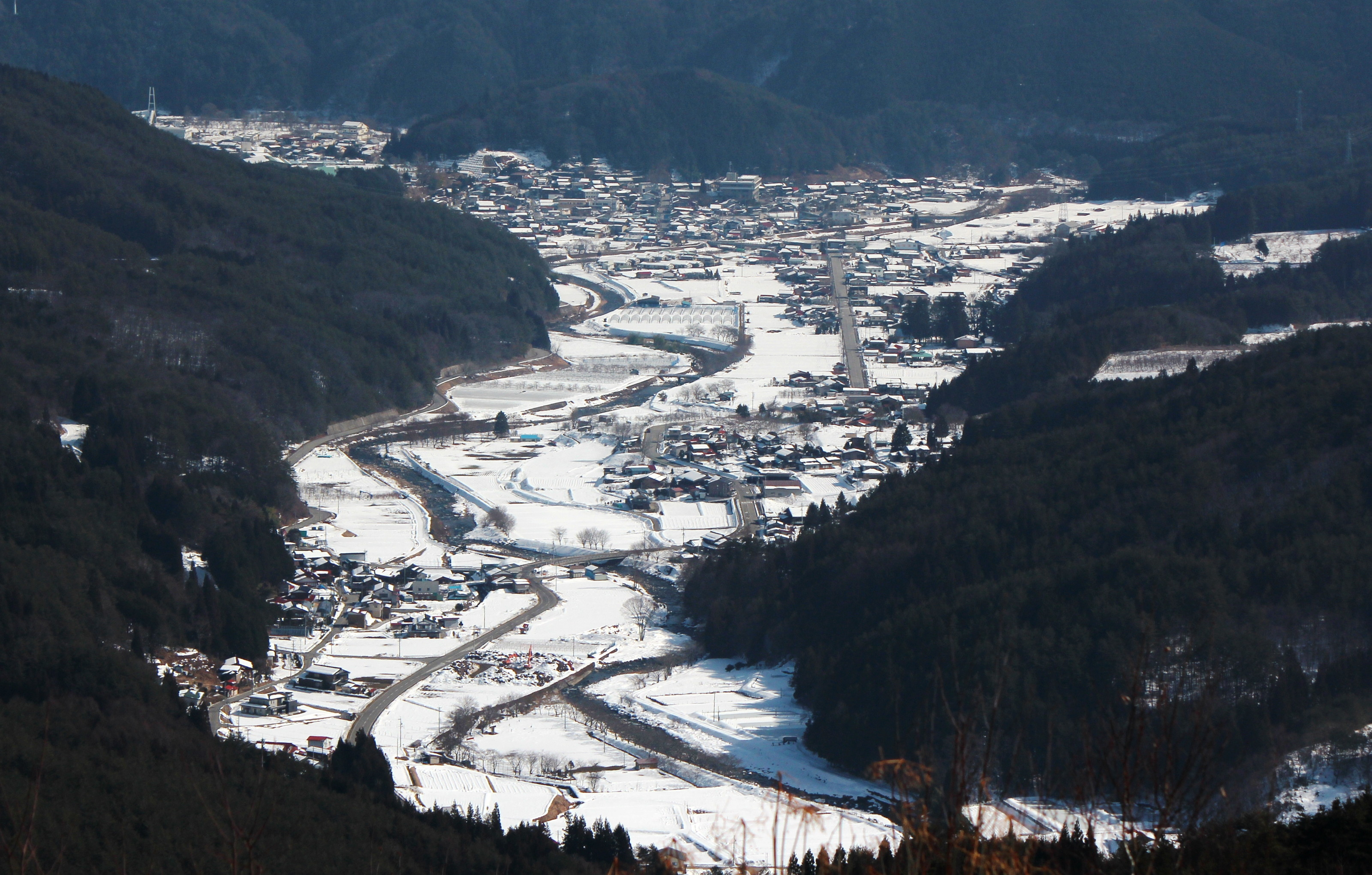
Kuguno, Gifu from Mount Kurai

The spring festivals are centered on the Four Shinto Shrines in the community.
