= Asahi, Gifu =

Dissolved municipality in Gifu prefecture, Japan

Location of Asahi in Gifu Prefecture

Asahi (朝日村, Asahi-mura) was a village located in Ōno District, Gifu Prefecture, Japan.

As of 2003, the village had an estimated population of 2,088 and a population density of 11.14 persons per km^{2}. The total area was 187.37 km^{2}.

On February 1, 2005, Asahi, along with the town of Kuguno, and the villages of Kiyomi, Miya, Nyūkawa, Shōkawa and Takane (all from Ōno District), the town of Kokufu, and the village of Kamitakara (both from Yoshiki District), was merged into the expanded city of Takayama and no longer exists as an independent municipality.

The village was once located in Mashita District (~April 1, 1950). Along with the village of Takane, the village was transferred to Ōno District on April 1, 1950, which lasted until February 1, 2005.
