= Miya, Gifu =

Dissolved municipality in Gifu prefecture, Japan

Map of Miya, Gifu

Miya (宮村, Miya-mura) was a village located in Ōno District, Gifu, Japan.

As of 2003, the village had an estimated population of 2,661 and a population density of 51.28 persons per km^{2}. The total area was 51.89 km^{2}.

On February 1, 2005, Miya, along with the town of Kuguno, and the villages of Asahi, Kiyomi, Nyūkawa, Shōkawa and Takane (all from Ōno District), the town of Kokufu, and the village of Kamitakara (both from Yoshiki District), was merged into the expanded city of Takayama and no longer exists as an independent municipality.
