= Kamitakara, Gifu =

Dissolved municipality in Gifu prefecture, Japan

Map of Kamitakara, Gifu

Kamitakara (上宝村, Kamitakara-mura) was a village located in Yoshiki District, Gifu Prefecture, Japan.

As of 2003, the village had an estimated population of 3,874 and a population density of 8.15 persons per km^{2}. The total area was 475.12 km^{2}.

On February 1, 2005, Kamitakara, along with the town of Kuguno, and the villages of Asahi, Kiyomi, Miya, Nyūkawa, Shōkawa and Takane (all from Ōno District), and the town of Kokufu (also from Yoshiki District), was merged into the expanded city of Takayama and no longer exists as an independent municipality.
