= Kokufu Station (disambiguation) =

Kokufu Station is a passenger railway station located in the city of Toyooka, Hyōgo Prefecture, Japan.

Kokufu Station or 国府駅 may also refer to:

- Hida-Kokufu Station
- Kō Station (Aichi)
