= Sarubobo =

Type of Japanese amulet

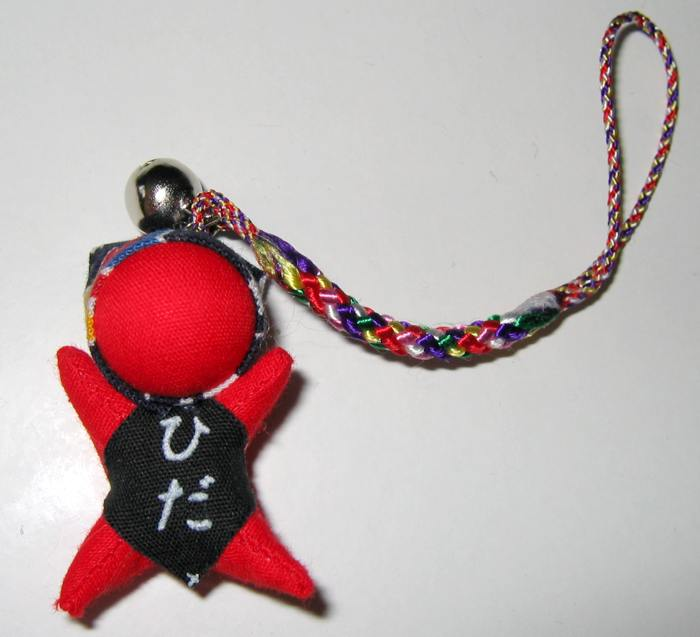
A tiny sarubobo, intended to be hung from a mobile phone

Sarubobo (さるぼぼ) is a Japanese amulet, particularly associated with the town of Takayama in Gifu Prefecture. Sarubobo are red human-shaped dolls, with no facial features, made in a variety of sizes. Traditionally, sarubobo are made by grandmothers for their grandchildren as dolls, and for their daughters as a charm for good marriage, good children and to ensure a well-rounded couple.

== Etymology ==
Sarubobo literally translated from the Japanese as "a baby monkey". "Saru" is the Japanese word for monkey, and "bobo" is the word for baby in the dialect of Takayama.

There are several reasons why the amulet has this name. The sarubobo is associated with three wishes:

- Protection from bad things.

In Japanese, the English word "leave" translates as "saru", so possession of a sarubobo means that bad things will "saru"

- A happy home, a good match

In Japanese, a happy home is "kanai enman", a good match is "ryo-en" (Another way of saying "saru" is "en".)

- Having an easy delivery on birth.

Monkeys' childbirth is easy.

The face of the sarubobo is traditionally red, as is the face of baby monkeys.

== Facelessness ==
Sarubobo dolls and charms usually have no facial features. The reasons for this are unclear, but some have been suggested. One suggestion is that, originally, sarubobo were made from left over cloth and made by relatives, so there was no need for them to be completely accurate.

Another suggestion is that the absence of a face allows the owner to imagine it - when the owner is sad, they can imagine their sarubobo to be sad too. A common tale told by the people of Takayama is that the facelessness is the result of the dolls being made during the period of World War II. The mothers knew that these were hard and unhappy times but, did not want to give the dolls sad faces. So they left them faceless.

== Modern sarubobo ==
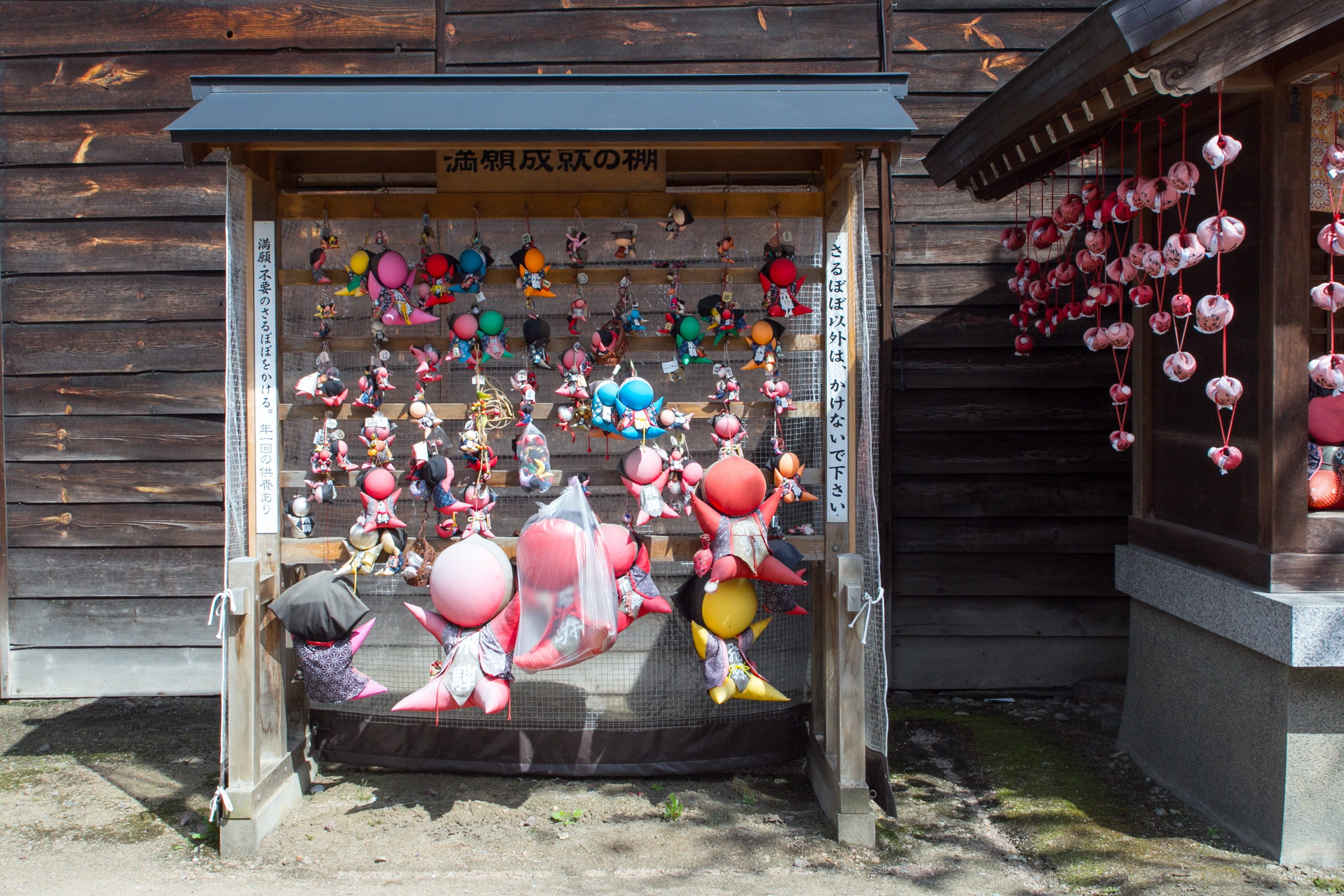
Sarubobo at Takayam's Hida Kokubunji Temple

Nowadays, sarubobo are a popular souvenir in Takayama, and are available in many different colours and shapes from souvenir shops. There is even a Hello Kitty doll dressed as a sarubobo.

The differently coloured sarubobo are each associated with different wishes;

- The red is for luck in marriage, fertility and childbirth
- Blue - for luck in study and work
- Pink - for luck in love
- Green - for luck in health
- Yellow - for luck in money
- Black - to remove bad luck
- Purple - for wisdom and personal growth

There is also a differently-shaped sarubobo called a tobibobo.
