= Chichibu Night Festival =

Annual festival in Saitama, Japan

The Chichibu Night Festival (秩父夜祭, Chichibu Yo Matsuri) is an annual festival held between 2 and 3 December in Chichibu, centred at the Chichibu Shrine The festival has been held for over 300 years, and has been described as a Japanese UNESCO Intangible Cultural Heritage item. In March 2020, the Time Out magazine described the Chichibu Night Festival as one of Japan's big three float festivals, along with the Gion Festival in Kyoto and the Takayama Festivals in Gifu.

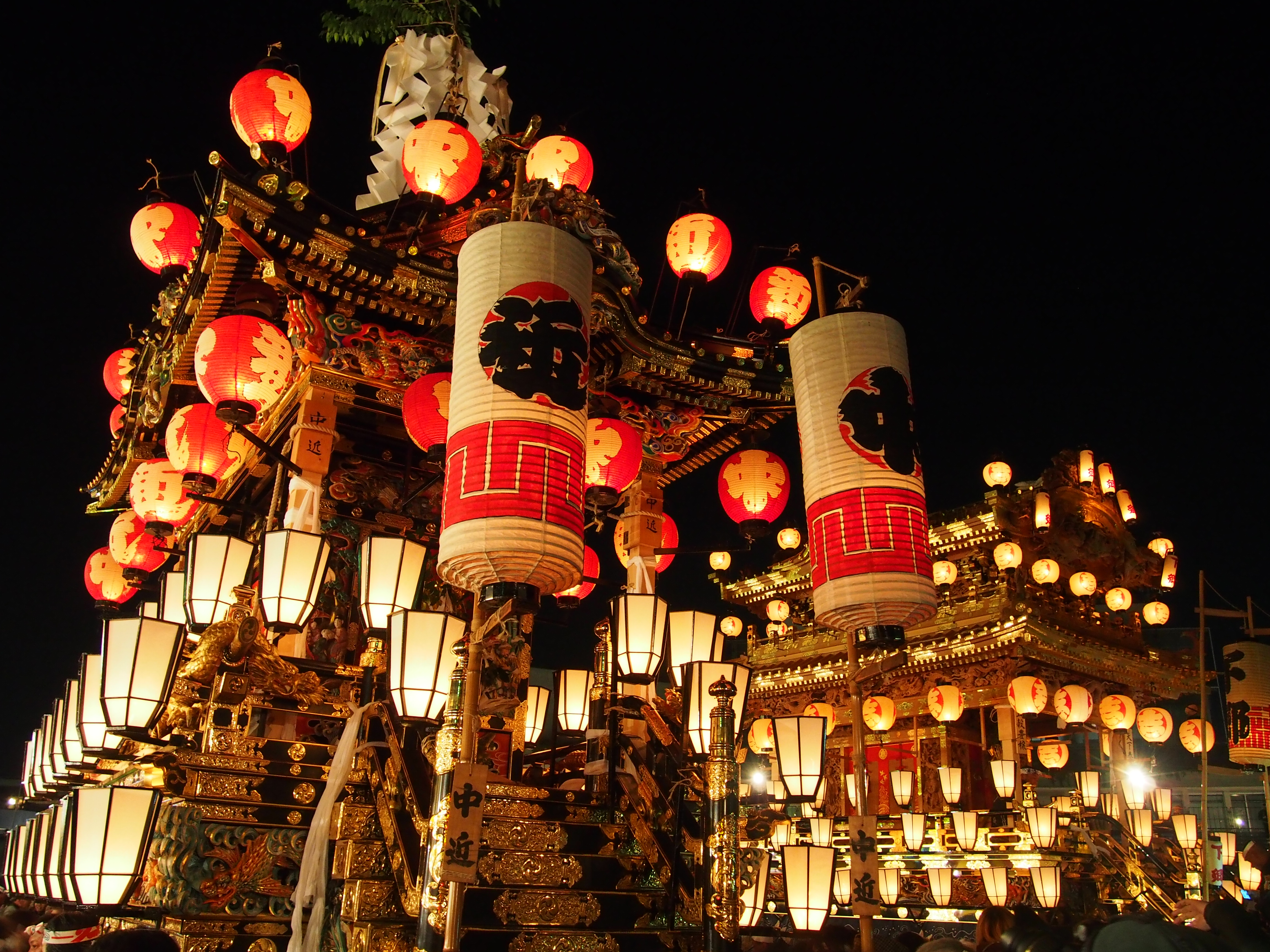
