= Hisako Nakamura =

Japanese artist and quadruple amputee (1897–1968)

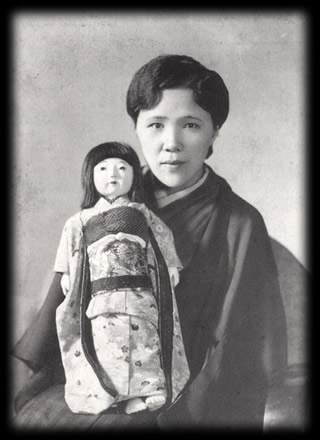
- Born: 中村久子; 1897; Takayama City, Gifu prefecture, Japan
- Died: 1968 (aged 70–71); Takayama City, Japan
- Occupations: Artist, author, performer

Hisako Nakamura (Japanese: 中村久子, 1897–1968) was a Japanese author, artist, and performer. Due to a childhood infection caused by frostbite, Nakamura lost both her hands and feet by the age of three. As an adult, she was featured in sideshow exhibitions showing her distinct needlework and knitting abilities. In later years, Nakamura became an accomplished and acknowledged calligraphist, doll-maker, and author, as well as a leading figure in Shin Buddhism.

== Early life ==
Hisako Nakamura was born in 1897 in Takayama City, in the Gifu prefecture of Japan. Her father, Eitaro Kaminari, was a tatami maker and her mother, Aya Kaminari, was a traditional doctor of herbology and external medicine. At the age of three, Nakamura developed frostbite from the cold temperatures in Takayama City, which progressed into gangrene, causing her to have both her hands and feet amputated. Nakamura grew up in poverty and faced discrimination from her community due to her physical condition and appearance. Her pain was considered karma from the gods, in return for her father not marrying the girl he loved. As a result, her father was instructed to repent, and she to stay indoors and away from others, excluded from activities, and kept out of school.

At age ten, Nakamura received texts, paper pencils, slate and chalk, from her grandmother that she could use as hand-me-down study materials. Through copying the writings, she gradually began to learn. Nakamura began writing by holding a pencil or a piece of chalk in her mouth, and by holding a pair of scissors between her legs. With practice, she mastered using scissors with her mouth and was also able to learn to hold a needle in her mouth and thread it, allowing her to sew her own garments. With time, Nakamura learned and adapted anything she needed or wanted to know how to do.

== Later life and career ==
Nakamura was twenty years old when she left her home in search of work to support herself. After being approached by one of her father's friends and not having many options available, she decided to join a sideshow exhibition in Nagoya. Nakamura was given the name Daruma Masume or "Daruma Daughter." Nakamura recalls in her memoir, The Hands and Feet of the Heart, "The name Daruma Masume might be said to be the fate of a woman without hands or feet. It was a name I hated." As an artist in the sideshow exhibition, Nakamura did needlework, knit, tied knots, and did works of calligraphy. Nakamura continued working in this exhibition—expanding her skills to doll-making and other areas—for twenty-two years. During this time, she was married to Yuzo Nakatani, shortly after the death of her mother and younger brother, Eizo. After their marriage, Nakamura gave birth to a daughter, Michiko.

In April 1923, Nakamura formally and officially requested to leave the sideshow exhibition, currently being run by the Ikeno's, part of the Yakuza syndicate. Prior to leaving, Nakatani had been in poor health and his health continued to deteriorate as they moved to his elder brother's home in Kiryu City. Shortly after moving there, Nakamura's grandmother's health worsened along with her husband's. They both passed within a few days of each other, with her daughter being eighteen months old at the time. Nakamura married another husband whom she lost to death and another whom she lost to divorce. She gave birth to two daughters, Tomiko and Taeko, in her second and third marriage. By the time she entered into her third marriage, she was once again performing in exhibitions. Her final marriage was in 1934 to Toshio Nakamura.

On April 17, 1937, Helen Keller visited Japan when attending a public meeting with the prime minister of Japan and other government ministers in Tokyo, Japan. Nakamura also attended this meeting, through the connections of an acquaintance, Takeo Iwahashi. Upon being able to meet Keller, Nakamura crafted a handmade, well-prepared doll and dressing for Keller. At their meeting, Keller was told in great detail about Nakamura and the story of her life. Upon understanding Nakamura's story, Keller embraced her with tears. She signed, "She is much more unfortunate than I, and a much greater person." Nakamura and Keller continued to embrace each other in tears, until Keller returned to her seat, holding the doll that Nakamura had hand-crafted her as a gift. Nakamura says of the encounter in her memoir, "When we work at something in which we put all our heart, there is neither ocean nor national boundary. The sacred and true mind of beings overcomes many obstacles in life--that is what I learned then." The two met two more times after this initial meeting, and their friendly bond continued.

At age forty-two, Nakamura encountered the Tannisho, which served as her spiritual awakening. The Jodo Shinshu teachings of Buddhism introduced a new and important path to her life, and through this realization, she decidedly rejected the advice to accept her situation passively. She began to live life with "boundless compassion that not only shouldered the burdens of her life as its ultimate concern, but provided the energy and strength for her to live each day positively and vigorously. Nakamura became known for her deep-seated faith and was a traveling and well-requested lecturer for the religion. She studied Buddhist books and publishing her own articles recounting her own experiences and Shin teachings.

== Death and legacy ==
Nakamura died in 1968 at her home in Takayama City. The memorial of her death is celebrated by her family members and by members of the Buddhist community who knew her and remember her. Her lectures and work in the Jodo Shinshu Buddhist community are still celebrated and acknowledged widely.

== Selected works ==
=== Books ===
- Τhe Hands and Feet of the Heart
