= Takayama Festival =

Japanese festival

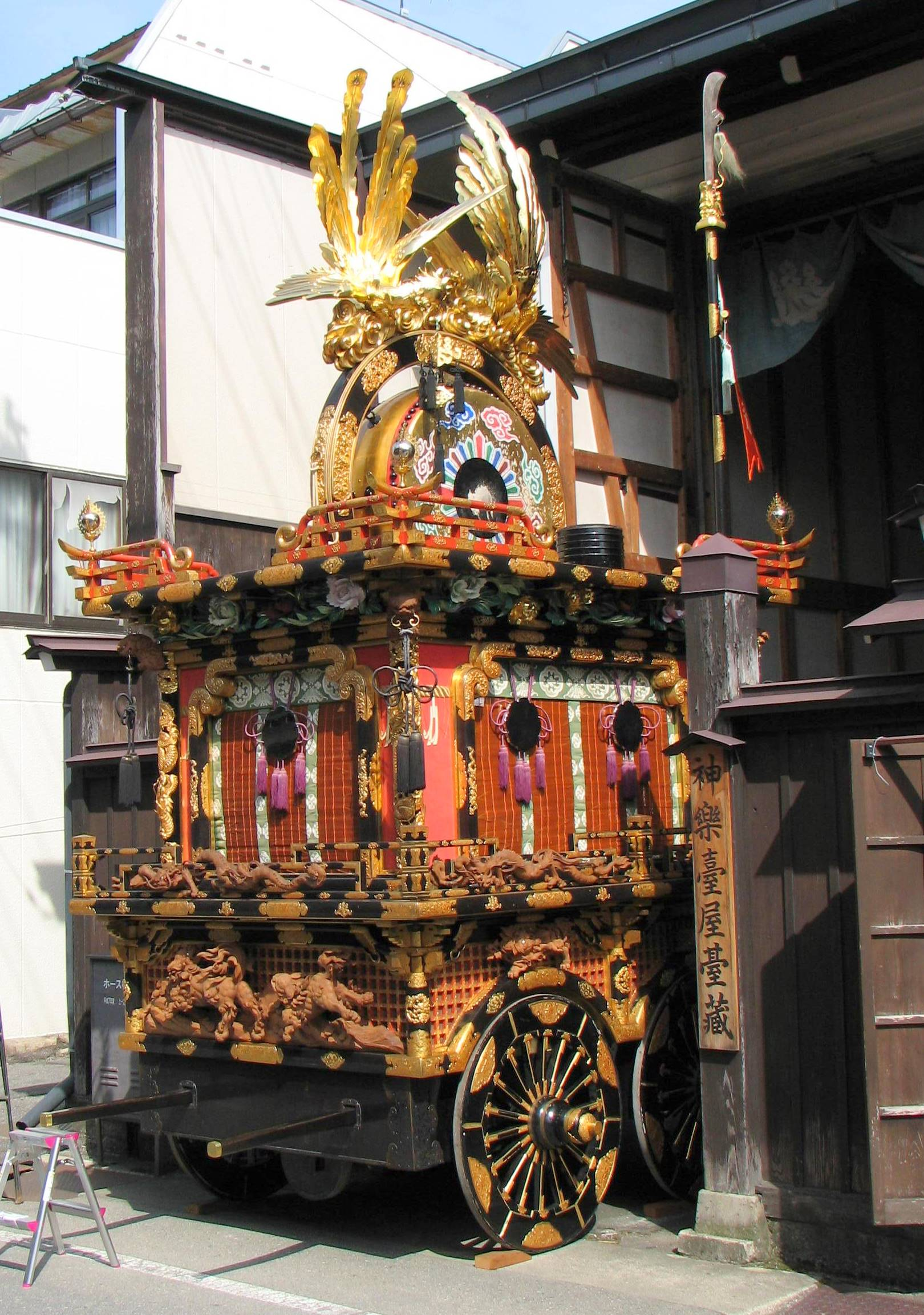
Takayama Matsuri Float

The Takayama Festivals (高山祭, Takayama Matsuri) in Takayama in Japan started in the 16th to 17th century. The festivals are believed to have been started during the rule of the Kanamori family. Correspondence dated 1692 place the origin to 40 years prior to that date. One of the festivals is held on 14 and 15 April and the other on 9 and 10 October.

The Spring Takayama Festival is centered on the Hie Shrine. The shrine is also known as the Sanno Shrine, and the spring festival is also known as the Sanno Festival. The Sanno Festival is held to pray for a good harvest and the Autumn Festival is for giving thanks.

The Autumn festival is centered on the Sakurayama Hachiman Shrine and is referred to as the Hachiman Festival. It is held after the crops are harvested. The fall festival is one of the three largest festivals in Japan. The other two are Kyoto's Gion Matsuri and the Chichibu Night Festival Matsuri.

== Floats ==
The festivals are famous for the large ornate floats, or yatai, which roam around the city at night. The floats date back to the 17th century, and are decorated with intricate carvings of gilded wood and detailed metal-work, similar in style to art from Kyoto during the Momoyama period, and blended with elements from the early Edo period. Detailed carving, lacquering and beautiful decorative metal-works is found not only on the outside of the floats, but inside as well, under the roof and behind the panels, where the work is amazingly detailed. The floats are also “gorgeously decorated with embroidered drapery."

"The yatai floats are lined up before dusk, and once the town becomes veiled in the evening darkness, as many as 100 chochin lanterns are lit on each of the floats. The unique ornaments of the yatai floats look even more resplendent in the darkness of the night". The floats are moved around the city by people but are wheeled carts and the bearers are not required to endure the load. The floats are lit by traditional lanterns and escorted on a tour of the city by people in traditional kimono or hakama. Each float reflects the district in Takayama to which it represents. The craftsmanship and the Hotei tai "has intricate marionettes" which perform on top. The puppet show is registered as a "cultural asset”. The tall festive floats are displayed during the two days of both festivals. During inclement weather the floats are returned to their storage houses. The Takayama Matsuri Yatai Kaikan stores four of the 11 fall floats; the others are stored in special storehouses throughout the city, when not in use. During inclement weather, the outer doors to the Yatai Kaikan are open so visitors may view them. The floats in the Yatai Kaikan are changed several times a year.

The Yatai Kaikan is located in the northern end of Takayama's old town, a 15–20 minute walk from the station. The Yatai Kaikan is open is from 08:30 to 17:00 from March to November and from 09:00 to 16:30 from December to February. The admission fee is 840 yen.

== Marionettes ==
The marionettes are made of wood, silk and brocade or embroidered cloth. They are operated by strings and push rods from within the yatai. “Karakuri (mechanical) puppet plays performed on a stage are superb”. The puppets like the Yatai represent the skilled craftsmen of the area. The three marionettes “on Hotei Tai (the god of fortune)” require 9 puppet masters to manipulate the 36 strings which make the marionettes move in a lifelike manner, with gestures, turns and other movements. A problem with the puppets are parts needed to repair the puppets. The springs in the puppets are made of Right whale baleen and cannot be replaced with steel springs or the baleen of other whales. Other materials used to make the springs cannot duplicate the movements of the springs made with Right whale baleen.

== See also ==
- Takayama, Gifu
