= Takayama, Gifu =

City in Gifu Prefecture, Japan

Takayama 高山市
- City
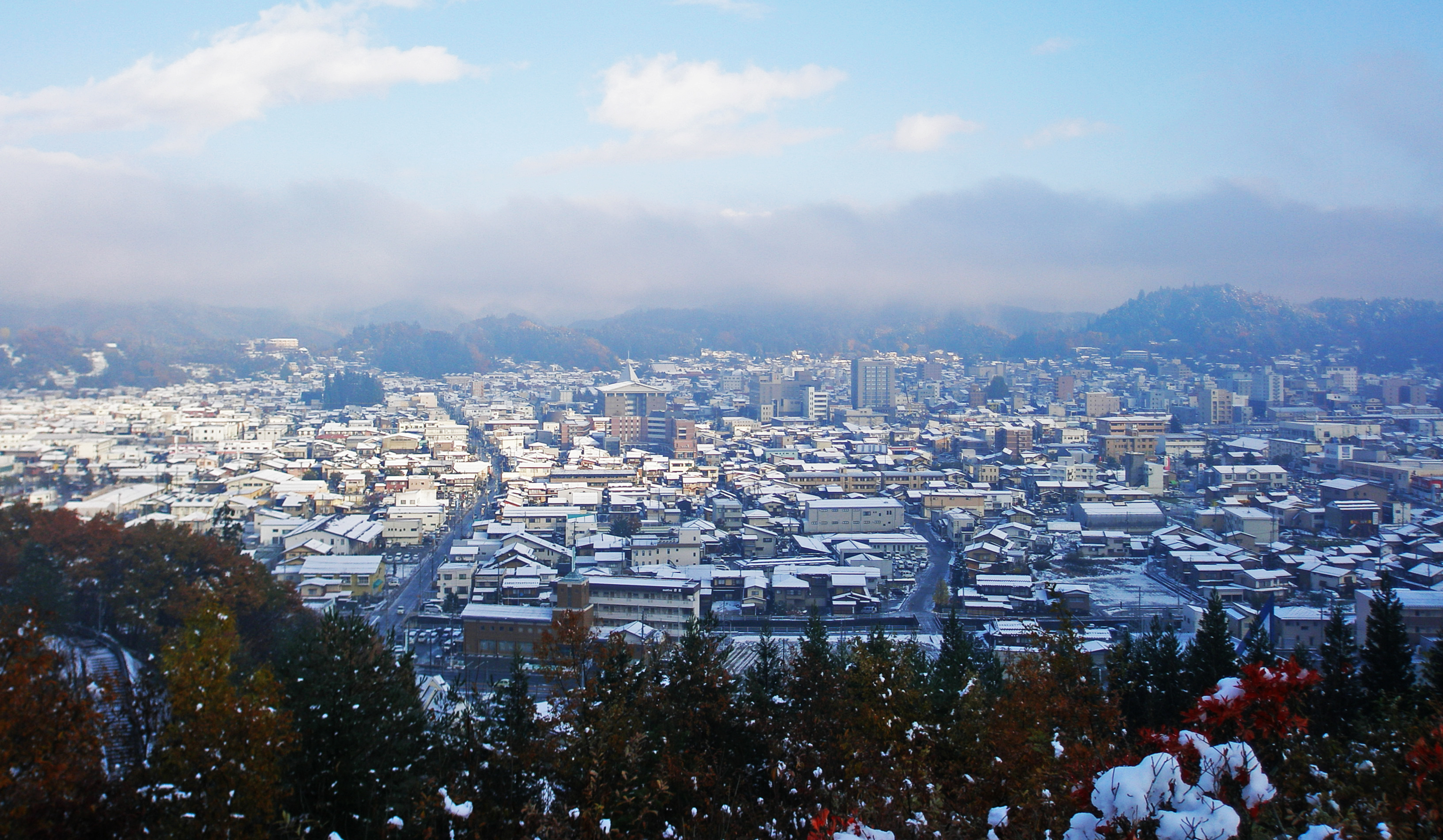
- City view from Tenbo Park

- Flag Seal
- Location of Takayama in Gifu Prefecture

- Coordinates: 36°8′45.7″N 137°15′7.8″E
- Country: Japan
- Region: Chūbu
- Prefecture: Gifu
- First official recorded: 377 AD
- City settled: November 1, 1936

Government
  - Mayor: Akira Tanaka(since September 2022)

Area
  - Total: 2,177.61 km^{2} (840.78 sq mi)

Population (September 1, 2025)
  - Total: 81,968
  - Density: 37.641/km^{2} (97.490/sq mi)
- Time zone: UTC+9 (Japan Standard Time)
- Phone number: 0577-32-3333
- Address: 2–18 Hanaoka-chō, Takayama-shi, Gifu-ken 506-8555
- Climate: Dfa
- Website: Official website
- Symbols
- Flower: Rhododendron reticulate
- Tree: Japanese yew

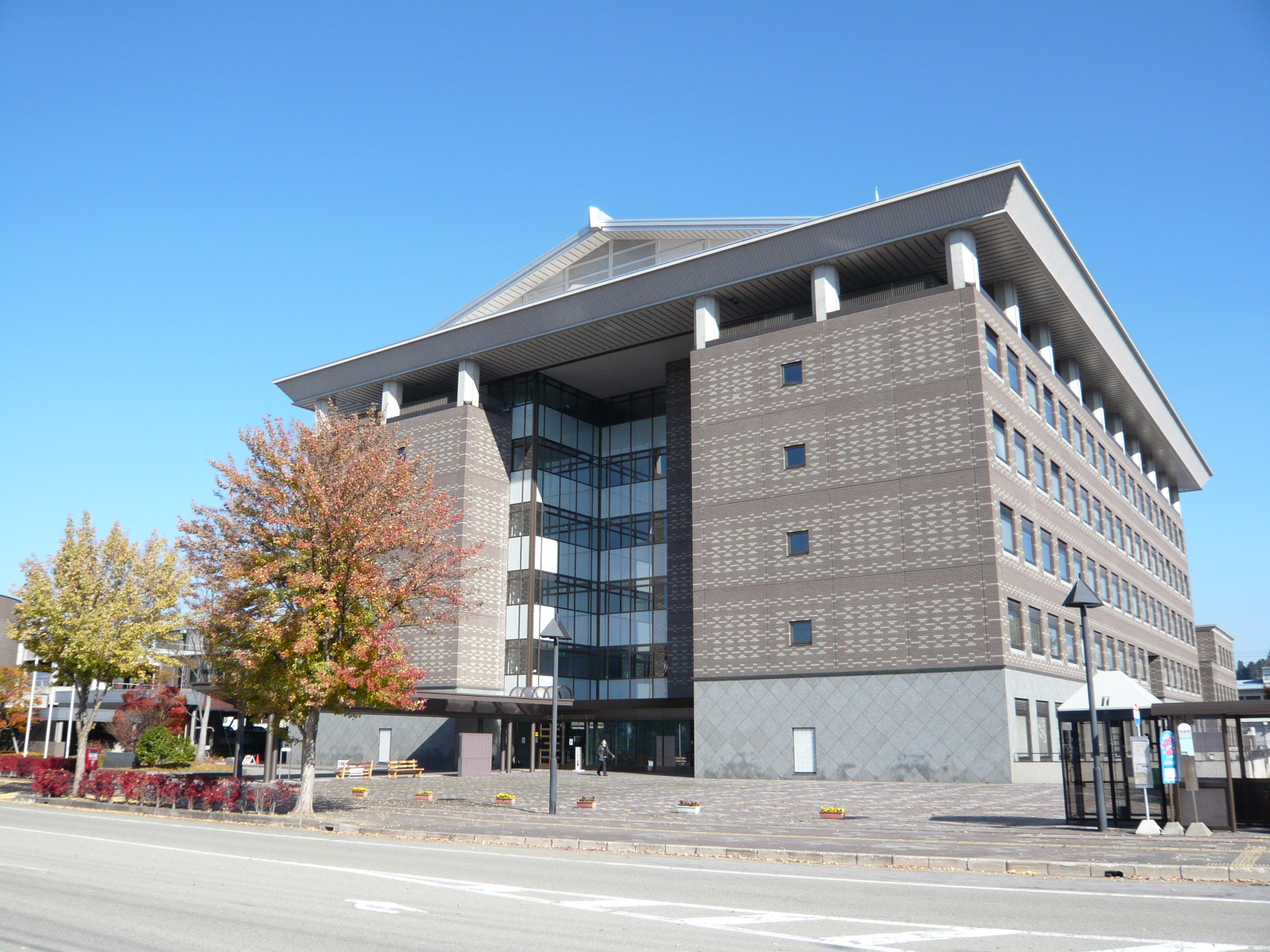
Takayama City Hall

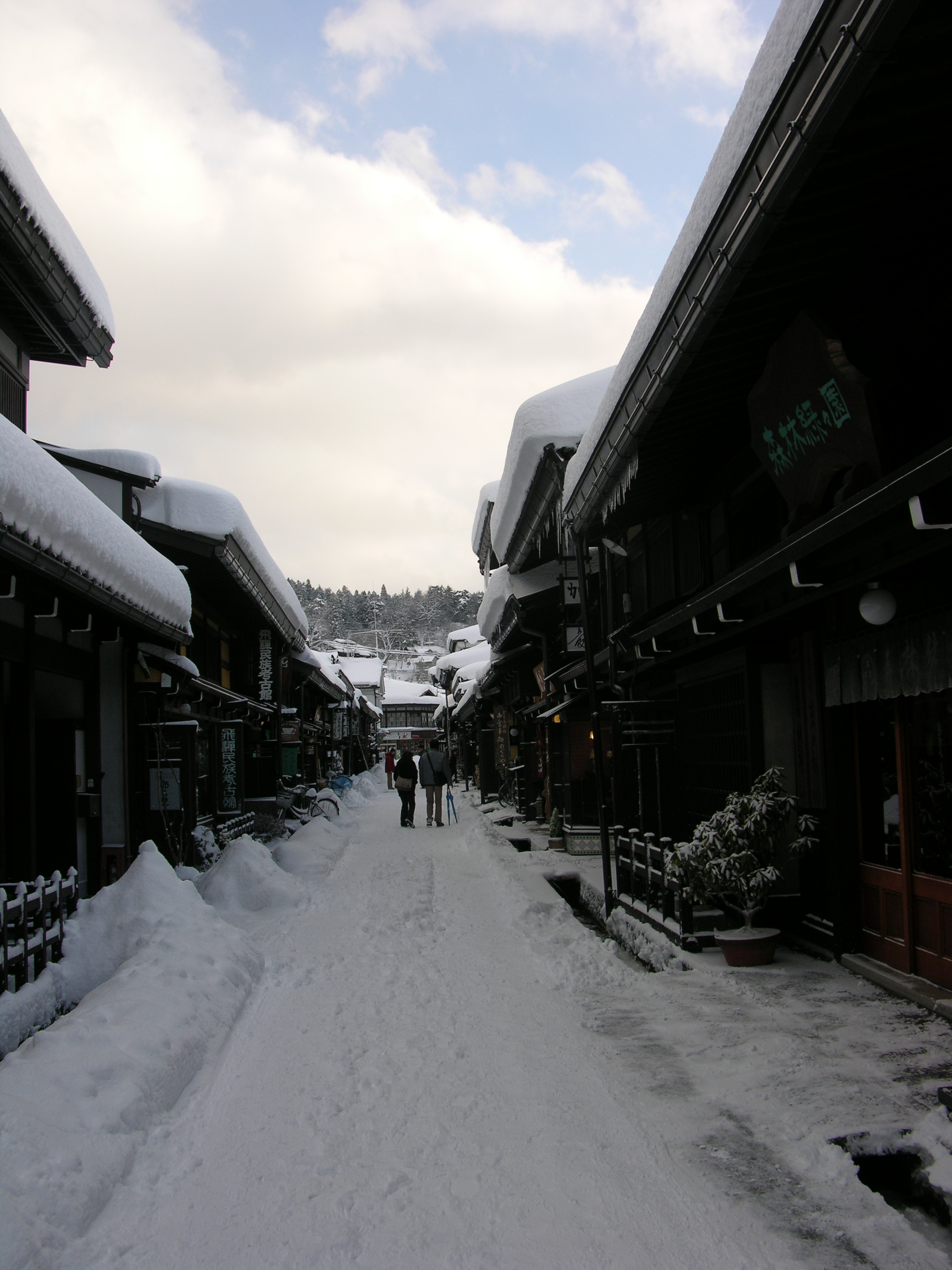
Traditional street during the winter

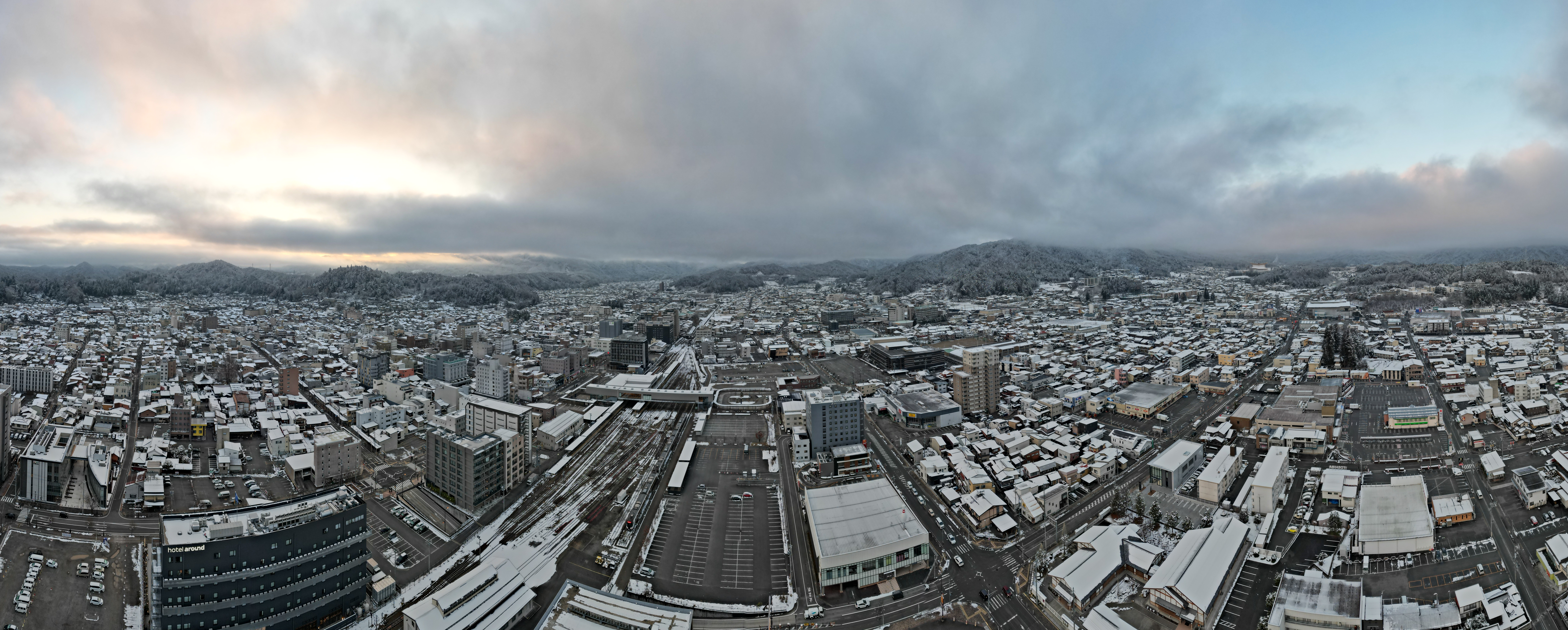
Takayama aerial panorama.

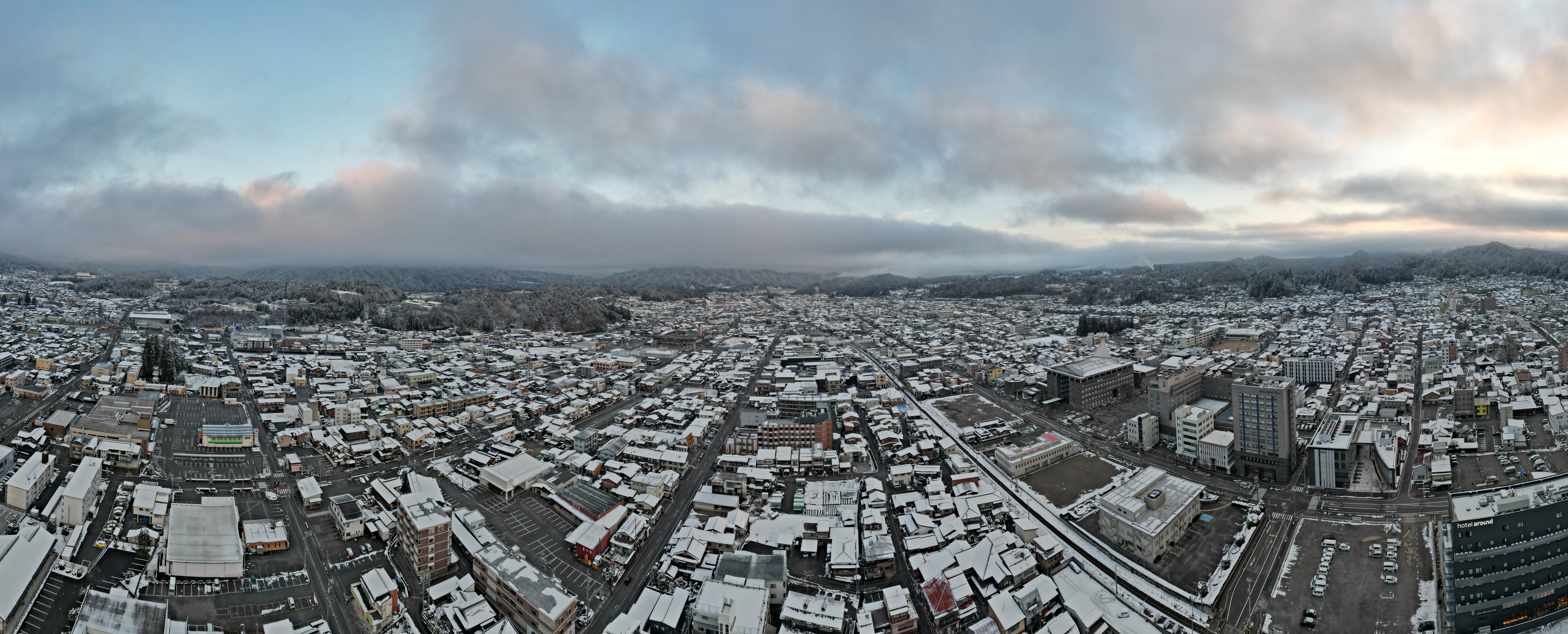
Takayama aerial perspective facing east.

Takayama (高山市, Takayama-shi; Japanese pronunciation: [tä̀.kä́.jä̀.mä̀, -jä́.mä́(.ɕì)]) is a city located in Gifu Prefecture, Japan. As of 1 September 2025, the city had an estimated population of 81,968 in 36,815 households, and a population density of 41 persons per km^{2}. The total area of the city was 2,177.61 square kilometers (840.78 sq mi) making it the largest city by area in Japan. The high altitude and separation from other areas of Japan kept the area fairly isolated, allowing Takayama to develop its own culture over about a 300-year period.

== Etymology ==
The city is popularly known as Hida-Takayama (飛騨高山) in reference to the old Hida Province to differentiate it from other places named Takayama. The name 'Takayama' means 'tall mountain'.

== Geography ==
Takayama is located in northern Gifu Prefecture, in the heart of the Japanese Alps. Mount Hotakadake is the highest point in the city at 3,190 meters (10,470 ft). The city has the largest geographic area of any municipality in Japan.

=== Neighboring municipalities ===
- Fukui Prefecture
  - Ōno
- Gifu Prefecture
  - Gero
  - Gujō
  - Hida
  - Shirakawa
- Ishikawa Prefecture
  - Hakusan
- Nagano Prefecture
  - Kiso
  - Matsumoto
  - Ōmachi
- Toyama Prefecture
  - Toyama

== Climate ==
The city has a climate characterized by hot and humid summers, and mild winters (Köppen climate classification Dfa). The average annual temperature in Takayama is 11.4 °C (52.5 °F). The average annual rainfall is 1,776.5 mm (69.94 in) with July as the wettest month. The temperatures are highest on average in August, at around 24.4 °C (75.9 °F), and lowest in January, at around −1.2 °C (29.8 °F). It features four distinct seasons with a wide range of temperatures between the summer and winter, somewhat resembling parts of northern Japan and Hokkaido. Takayama is part of the heavy snow area of Japan (豪雪地帯, gōsetsu-chitai) with snowfall most days throughout the winter season. Takayama and many other places exposed to the Sea of Japan experience lake-effect snow, generating some of the highest, most consistent snowfall in the world.

Spring is short-lived, usually dry with mild temperatures and plenty of sunshine. Cherry blossoms can be seen in Takayama from the middle to the end of April, around three weeks later than Nagoya.

Summer begins around the end of May to the beginning of June. It is humid and wet with the arrival of the rainy season (梅雨, tsuyu), receiving high rainfall amounts. It then yields to a hotter and generally less humid end to the summer with daytime temperatures usually higher than 30 °C (86 °F) and occasionally higher than 35 °C (95 °F) coupled with strong sunshine.

Autumn approaches during the middle of October and is short and dry. and cool with diminishing sunlight. Colorful foliage from maples (紅葉, momiji/kōyō) can be seen in the Takayama area from the end of October to the first week of November.

Winter arrives around the beginning of December and is moderately long, cold, and icy with high amounts of snowfall annually amounting to an average of 5.11 meters (201 inches) commonly leading to the development of snowbanks in the outer areas of the city. The first snowfall usually arrives at the end of November and lasts until the beginning of April. Yearly low temperatures in the city center drop as low as −15 °C (5 °F) and occasionally fail to reach above freezing point during the day.

Climate data for Takayama (1991–2020 normals, extremes 1899–present)
Month	Jan	Feb	Mar	Apr	May	Jun	Jul	Aug	Sep	Oct	Nov	Dec	Year
Record high °C (°F)	16.7 (62.1)	18.5 (65.3)	24.3 (75.7)	30.6 (87.1)	33.2 (91.8)	35.8 (96.4)	37.1 (98.8)	37.7 (99.9)	35.4 (95.7)	30.2 (86.4)	25.2 (77.4)	21.7 (71.1)	37.7 (99.9)
Mean maximum °C (°F)	8.9 (48.0)	12.5 (54.5)	18.8 (65.8)	26.2 (79.2)	29.9 (85.8)	31.6 (88.9)	34.4 (93.9)	35.3 (95.5)	32.2 (90.0)	26.4 (79.5)	20.2 (68.4)	14.0 (57.2)	35.6 (96.1)
Mean daily maximum °C (°F)	3.2 (37.8)	4.7 (40.5)	9.8 (49.6)	17.0 (62.6)	22.9 (73.2)	26.1 (79.0)	29.5 (85.1)	31.0 (87.8)	26.1 (79.0)	19.9 (67.8)	13.1 (55.6)	6.2 (43.2)	17.5 (63.5)
Daily mean °C (°F)	−1.2 (29.8)	−0.6 (30.9)	3.4 (38.1)	9.7 (49.5)	15.6 (60.1)	19.7 (67.5)	23.5 (74.3)	24.4 (75.9)	20.0 (68.0)	13.5 (56.3)	7.1 (44.8)	1.6 (34.9)	11.4 (52.5)
Mean daily minimum °C (°F)	−4.8 (23.4)	−4.9 (23.2)	−1.6 (29.1)	3.4 (38.1)	9.4 (48.9)	14.9 (58.8)	19.4 (66.9)	20.1 (68.2)	15.9 (60.6)	9.2 (48.6)	2.9 (37.2)	−1.7 (28.9)	6.9 (44.4)
Mean minimum °C (°F)	−10.8 (12.6)	−11.6 (11.1)	−7.3 (18.9)	−3.2 (26.2)	2.4 (36.3)	8.8 (47.8)	15.9 (60.6)	15.9 (60.6)	9.4 (48.9)	2.8 (37.0)	−2.3 (27.9)	−7.3 (18.9)	−12.2 (10.0)
Record low °C (°F)	−23.5 (−10.3)	−25.5 (−13.9)	−21.2 (−6.2)	−7.6 (18.3)	−3.1 (26.4)	1.8 (35.2)	8.1 (46.6)	9.4 (48.9)	3.8 (38.8)	−3.5 (25.7)	−10.7 (12.7)	−19.5 (−3.1)	−25.5 (−13.9)
Average precipitation mm (inches)	101.9 (4.01)	93.5 (3.68)	122.5 (4.82)	123.9 (4.88)	125.2 (4.93)	170.4 (6.71)	260.9 (10.27)	197.9 (7.79)	225.9 (8.89)	155.5 (6.12)	94.4 (3.72)	104.4 (4.11)	1,776.5 (69.94)
Average snowfall cm (inches)	117 (46)	90 (35)	29 (11)	3 (1.2)	0 (0)	0 (0)	0 (0)	0 (0)	0 (0)	0 (0)	2 (0.8)	66 (26)	305 (120)
Average precipitation days (≥ 0.5 mm)	17.6	14.3	14.9	12.6	11.8	13.2	15.7	12.5	13.0	11.6	12.4	17.0	166.6
Average relative humidity (%)	82	78	73	68	68	74	78	77	79	81	82	84	77
Mean monthly sunshine hours	92.9	115.6	153.8	173.5	189.2	143.6	147.0	177.3	131.6	128.9	100.8	82.4	1,638.3
Source: Japan Meteorological Agency

Climate data for Tochio, Takayama (1991–2020 normals, extremes 1978–present)
Month	Jan	Feb	Mar	Apr	May	Jun	Jul	Aug	Sep	Oct	Nov	Dec	Year
Record high °C (°F)	13.3 (55.9)	17.2 (63.0)	23.1 (73.6)	28.4 (83.1)	31.8 (89.2)	33.3 (91.9)	35.2 (95.4)	35.4 (95.7)	34.7 (94.5)	28.6 (83.5)	24.6 (76.3)	19.3 (66.7)	35.4 (95.7)
Mean daily maximum °C (°F)	1.7 (35.1)	2.9 (37.2)	7.7 (45.9)	15.1 (59.2)	20.9 (69.6)	24.2 (75.6)	27.5 (81.5)	29.0 (84.2)	24.2 (75.6)	18.0 (64.4)	11.5 (52.7)	4.6 (40.3)	15.6 (60.1)
Daily mean °C (°F)	−2.3 (27.9)	−1.9 (28.6)	1.8 (35.2)	8.0 (46.4)	13.6 (56.5)	17.5 (63.5)	21.1 (70.0)	22.2 (72.0)	18.0 (64.4)	11.8 (53.2)	5.8 (42.4)	0.4 (32.7)	9.7 (49.5)
Mean daily minimum °C (°F)	−5.9 (21.4)	−6.2 (20.8)	−2.8 (27.0)	2.2 (36.0)	7.4 (45.3)	12.5 (54.5)	16.9 (62.4)	17.6 (63.7)	13.7 (56.7)	7.2 (45.0)	1.5 (34.7)	−3.0 (26.6)	5.1 (41.2)
Record low °C (°F)	−14.2 (6.4)	−14.9 (5.2)	−12.7 (9.1)	−9.2 (15.4)	−2.2 (28.0)	3.5 (38.3)	9.5 (49.1)	8.9 (48.0)	1.9 (35.4)	−3.1 (26.4)	−6.9 (19.6)	−13.8 (7.2)	−14.9 (5.2)
Average precipitation mm (inches)	95.6 (3.76)	97.4 (3.83)	137.3 (5.41)	145.1 (5.71)	166.1 (6.54)	203.8 (8.02)	338.5 (13.33)	203.6 (8.02)	222.8 (8.77)	168.4 (6.63)	129.6 (5.10)	108.7 (4.28)	2,004.2 (78.91)
Average precipitation days (≥ 1.0 mm)	15.6	12.8	13.8	12.8	12.6	13.3	16.6	12.4	12.5	11.9	12.7	16.0	162.9
Mean monthly sunshine hours	69.4	97.0	130.7	168.9	195.3	157.8	150.3	178.0	133.5	138.3	104.1	70.7	1,595.1
Source: Japan Meteorological Agency

Climate data for Miyanomae, Takayama (1991–2020 normals, extremes 1978–present)
Month	Jan	Feb	Mar	Apr	May	Jun	Jul	Aug	Sep	Oct	Nov	Dec	Year
Record high °C (°F)	12.2 (54.0)	16.3 (61.3)	20.9 (69.6)	27.3 (81.1)	29.7 (85.5)	32.1 (89.8)	33.1 (91.6)	33.5 (92.3)	32.2 (90.0)	26.8 (80.2)	22.8 (73.0)	19.3 (66.7)	33.5 (92.3)
Mean daily maximum °C (°F)	1.0 (33.8)	2.1 (35.8)	6.5 (43.7)	13.7 (56.7)	19.6 (67.3)	22.8 (73.0)	26.3 (79.3)	27.6 (81.7)	23.0 (73.4)	17.0 (62.6)	10.8 (51.4)	4.1 (39.4)	14.5 (58.1)
Daily mean °C (°F)	−3.9 (25.0)	−3.5 (25.7)	0.4 (32.7)	6.8 (44.2)	12.6 (54.7)	16.7 (62.1)	20.6 (69.1)	21.3 (70.3)	17.2 (63.0)	10.7 (51.3)	4.6 (40.3)	−0.9 (30.4)	8.6 (47.5)
Mean daily minimum °C (°F)	−9.1 (15.6)	−9.4 (15.1)	−5.1 (22.8)	0.3 (32.5)	5.9 (42.6)	11.5 (52.7)	16.0 (60.8)	16.6 (61.9)	12.6 (54.7)	5.7 (42.3)	−0.4 (31.3)	−5.3 (22.5)	3.3 (37.9)
Record low °C (°F)	−19.9 (−3.8)	−20.3 (−4.5)	−17.2 (1.0)	−12.8 (9.0)	−3.3 (26.1)	0.8 (33.4)	4.3 (39.7)	6.9 (44.4)	−0.2 (31.6)	−4.4 (24.1)	−10.9 (12.4)	−18.5 (−1.3)	−20.3 (−4.5)
Average precipitation mm (inches)	95.1 (3.74)	102.4 (4.03)	145.4 (5.72)	141.6 (5.57)	157.8 (6.21)	210.7 (8.30)	306.3 (12.06)	214.5 (8.44)	240.8 (9.48)	175.2 (6.90)	121.9 (4.80)	104.5 (4.11)	2,016.1 (79.37)
Average precipitation days (≥ 1.0 mm)	15.3	13.1	14.6	12.1	11.8	14.5	15.3	13.1	12.6	11.6	11.7	14.8	160.6
Mean monthly sunshine hours	87.6	108.0	146.4	177.3	200.9	152.1	153.1	179.1	139.0	142.3	118.9	88.0	1,693.5
Source: Japan Meteorological Agency

Climate data for Mumaya, Takayama (1991–2020 normals, extremes 1978–present)
Month	Jan	Feb	Mar	Apr	May	Jun	Jul	Aug	Sep	Oct	Nov	Dec	Year
Record high °C (°F)	9.6 (49.3)	13.4 (56.1)	19.1 (66.4)	26.8 (80.2)	28.7 (83.7)	31.2 (88.2)	32.7 (90.9)	33.5 (92.3)	30.8 (87.4)	25.6 (78.1)	22.4 (72.3)	18.0 (64.4)	33.5 (92.3)
Mean daily maximum °C (°F)	−0.1 (31.8)	1.1 (34.0)	5.1 (41.2)	12.2 (54.0)	18.3 (64.9)	21.6 (70.9)	25.2 (77.4)	26.5 (79.7)	22.0 (71.6)	16.2 (61.2)	9.8 (49.6)	2.9 (37.2)	13.4 (56.1)
Daily mean °C (°F)	−5.1 (22.8)	−4.6 (23.7)	−0.8 (30.6)	5.2 (41.4)	11.3 (52.3)	15.8 (60.4)	19.9 (67.8)	20.6 (69.1)	16.4 (61.5)	9.8 (49.6)	3.6 (38.5)	−2.0 (28.4)	7.5 (45.5)
Mean daily minimum °C (°F)	−11.3 (11.7)	−11.4 (11.5)	−7.1 (19.2)	−1.6 (29.1)	3.9 (39.0)	10.1 (50.2)	15.4 (59.7)	16.0 (60.8)	11.6 (52.9)	4.2 (39.6)	−2.0 (28.4)	−7.4 (18.7)	1.7 (35.1)
Record low °C (°F)	−25.1 (−13.2)	−25.4 (−13.7)	−22.0 (−7.6)	−17.3 (0.9)	−6.1 (21.0)	−1.6 (29.1)	3.7 (38.7)	6.0 (42.8)	−1.1 (30.0)	−8.0 (17.6)	−16.4 (2.5)	−23.8 (−10.8)	−25.4 (−13.7)
Average precipitation mm (inches)	143.8 (5.66)	128.3 (5.05)	167.6 (6.60)	189.9 (7.48)	203.3 (8.00)	253.1 (9.96)	353.3 (13.91)	257.9 (10.15)	319.5 (12.58)	195.7 (7.70)	137.3 (5.41)	155.4 (6.12)	2,489.9 (98.03)
Average precipitation days (≥ 1.0 mm)	17.8	14.3	14.2	12.3	12.1	13.3	15.4	13.4	13.0	11.3	11.9	17.0	166.0
Mean monthly sunshine hours	78.6	108.6	154.4	181.6	194.4	144.7	135.0	159.5	126.4	137.7	117.8	85.7	1,625.9
Source: Japan Meteorological Agency

== Demographics ==
Per Japanese census data, the population of Takayama peaked around the year 2000 and has declined since.

Historical population
Year	Pop.	±%
1940	60,258	—
1970	88,602	+47.0%
1980	95,037	+7.3%
1990	95,859	+0.9%
2000	97,023	+1.2%
2010	92,747	−4.4%
2020	84,419	−9.0%
2025	81,968	−2.9%
Source: The Population of the Prefectures and Cities of Japan in Most Recent Times (Based upon the results of the 1940 census), Takayama population statistics

== History ==
The area around Takayama was part of traditional Hida Province and was settled as far back as the Jōmon period. During the Sengoku period, Kanamori Nagachika ruled the area from Takayama Castle and the town of Takayama developed as a castle town. During the Edo period, the area was tenryō under the direct control of the Tokugawa shogunate. In the post-Meiji Restoration cadastral reforms, Ōno District in Gifu prefecture was created, and the town of Takayama was established in 1889 with the creation of the modern municipalities system. At the time, it was the most populous municipality in Gifu Prefecture. On November 1, 1936, Takayama merged with the town of Onada, forming the city of Takayama. Takayama annexed the village of Josue in 1943 and the village of Ohachiga in 1955. On February 1, 2005, the town of Kuguno and the villages of Asahi, Kiyomi, Miya, Nyūkawa, Shōkawa, and Takane (all from Ōno District), the town of Kokufu, and the village of Kamitakara (both from Yoshiki District) were absorbed to create the expanded city of Takayama. This made Takayama both the largest city and largest municipality in Japan by area.

== Government ==
Takayama has a mayor-council form of government with a directly elected mayor and a unicameral city legislature of 24 members.

== Economy ==
The economy of Takayama is strongly based on tourism, agriculture, and woodworking.

== Education ==
=== Colleges and universities ===
- Gifu University – Takayama Watershed Area Science Research Centre
- Kyoto University – Hida Observatory
- Nagoya University – Takayama Earthquake Observatory

=== Primary and secondary education ===
Takayama has 19 public elementary schools and 12 public middle schools operated by the city government. The city has three public high schools operated by the Gifu Prefectural Board of Education, and one private high school.

== Transportation ==
=== Railway ===
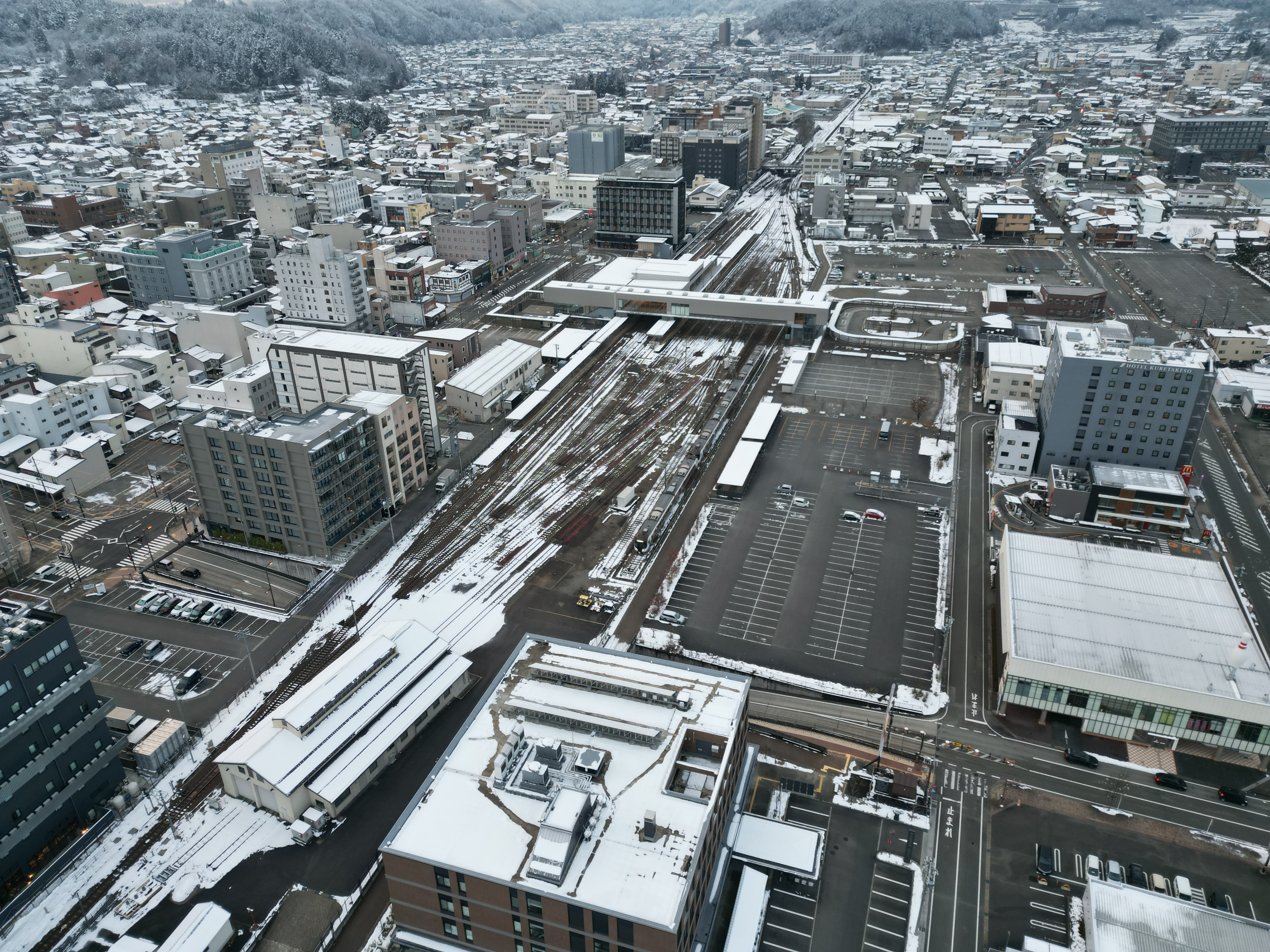
Takayama Train and Bus Station from above.

JR Tōkai – Takayama Main Line

- Nagisa – Kuguno – Hida-Ichinomiya – Takayama – Hozue – Hida-Kokufu

=== Highway ===
- Tōkai-Hokuriku Expressway
- Chūbu-Jūkan Expressway
- National Route 41
- National Route 156
- National Route 158
- National Route 257
- National Route 361
- National Route 471
- National Route 472

== Sister cities ==
Domestic

- Matsumoto, Nagano Prefecture, since November 1, 1971
- Hiratsuka, Kanagawa Prefecture, since October 22, 1982
- Echizen, Fukui Prefecture, since October 22, 1982
- Kaminoyama, Yamagata Prefecture, since October 13, 1988

International

- Denver, Colorado, United States, since June 27, 1960
- Lijiang, Yunnan, People's Republic of China friendship city, since March 21, 2002
- Kunming, Yunnan, People's Republic of China friendship city, since April 23, 2012
- Sibiu, Romania, friendship city, since September 4, 2012
- Urubamba, Cusco, Peru friendship city, since August 22, 2013

== Local attractions ==
This city was selected as one of the top ten travel destinations in Asia by Lonely Planet Magazine in the year 2017.

- Mount Norikura, a dormant volcano that is 3,026 meters (9,928 ft) tall is east of Takayama. A bus takes visitors to a point near the summit.
- Shin-Hotaka Ropeway and Okuhida Spa Resort: There is a 3,200-meter ropeway offering great views of the Northern Alps.
- There are old homes in the heart of Takayama that are cultural artifacts.
- Takayama has multiple morning markets near the river in the center of town.
- The Hida Minzoku Mura Folk Village is nearby.
- Takayama is the home of one of the three largest Shinto festivals in Japan. The Takayama Festivals are two distinctive festivals. The yatai (floats) used can be found in the Takayama Yatai Kaikan (Takayama Festival Float Exhibition Hall). Nearby is the Sakurayama Nikkō Kan, an exhibit of 1/10 scale replicas of Nikkō's famous Tōshō-gū shrine.
- Takayama-shi Kyodo-kan is a local history museum with handicrafts and traditional items.
- Takayama Jin'ya is a historical government house and National Historic Site
- Kusakabe Folk Museum is a local museum in an old merchant's home.
- Hida Kokubun-ji, founded in the Nara period as the provincial temple of Hida, it is the oldest structure in Takayama. It has a three-level pagoda and stands beside a ginkgo tree that is over 1,200 years old.
- Ankokuji Temple and Storehouse is an ancient structure from 1408 that is recognized as a national treasure.
- Hida Takayama Kur Alp (Hida Takayama Spa Land) is a large public bath and swimming area.
- World shrine to Su-God, the worldwide headquarters of Sukyo Mahikari organization
- Hida Tōshō-gū shrine
- Akahogi Tile Kiln Site, a National Historic Site
- Dōnosora Site, ruins of a Jōmon period village, a National Historic Site
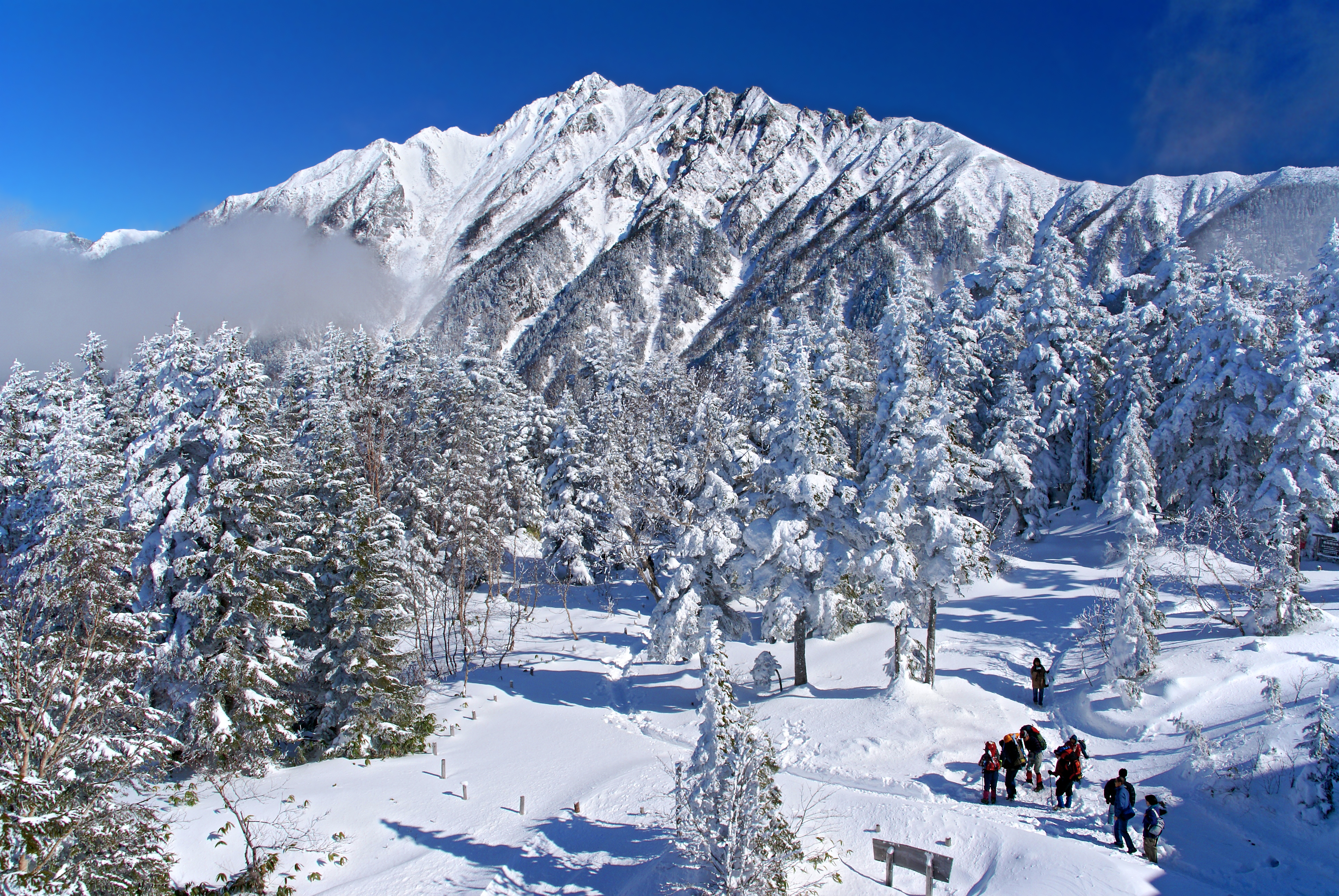
Hida Mountains

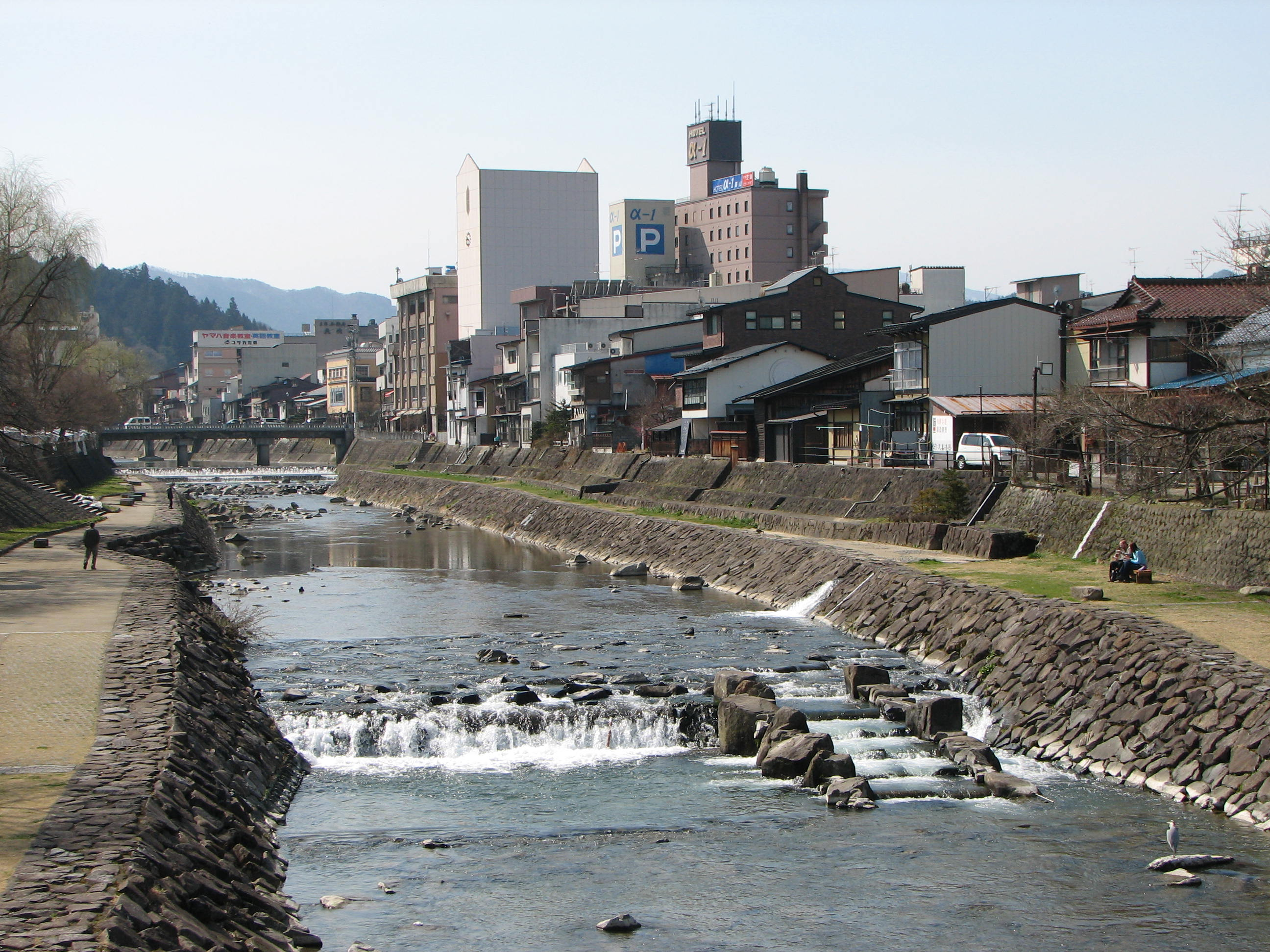
Miyagawa River

Sanmachi Street

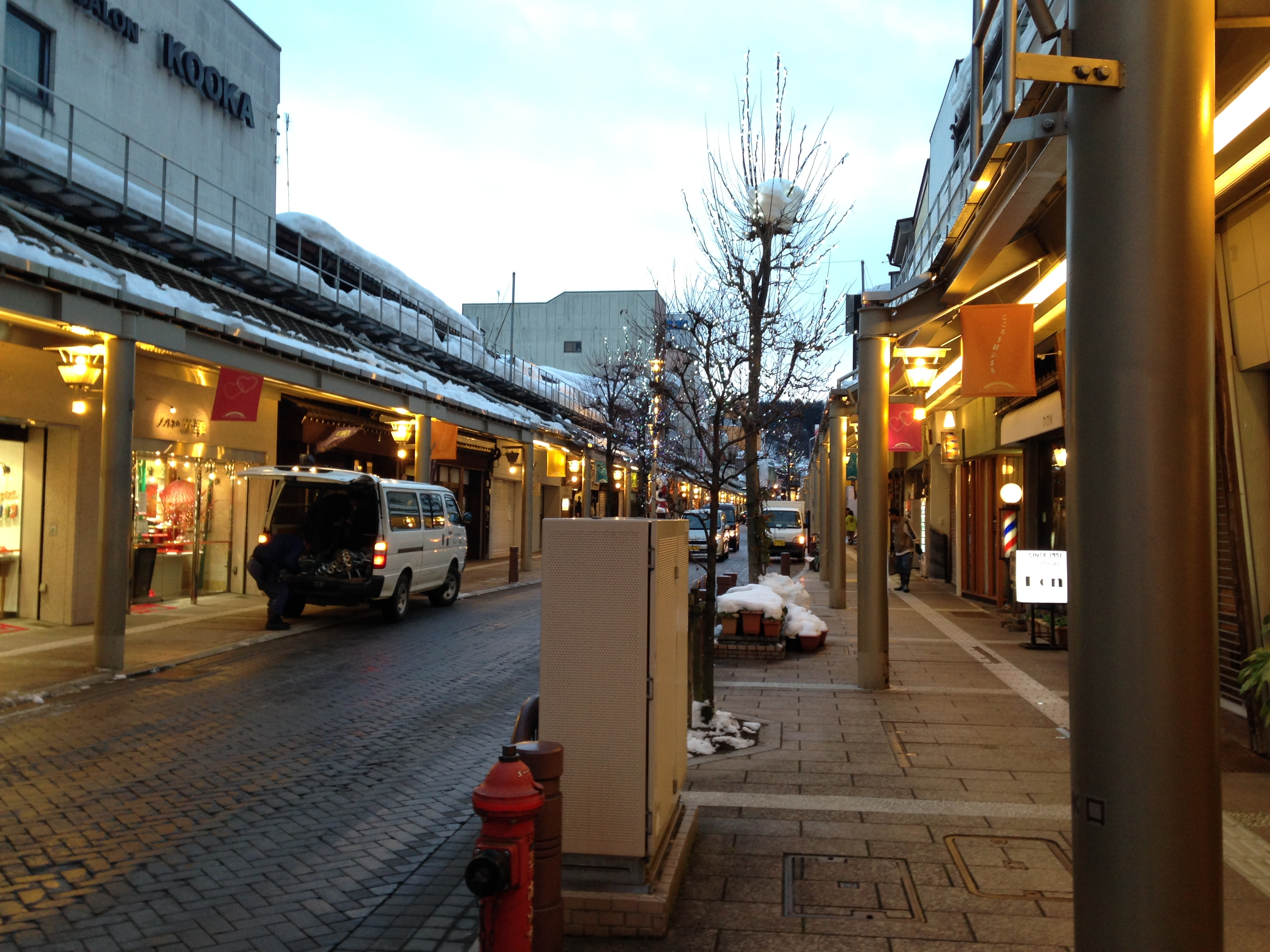
Hommachi shopping street

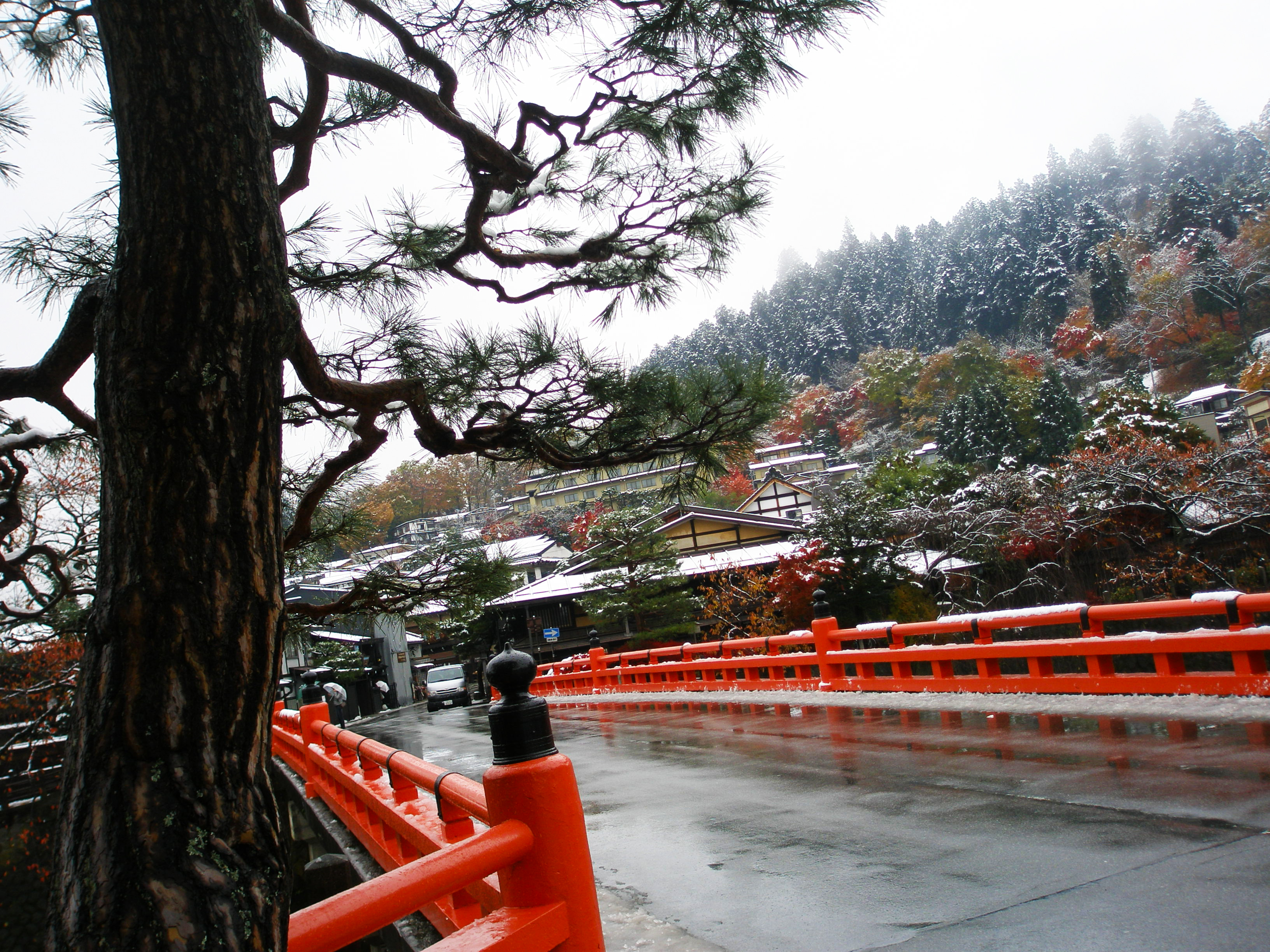
Nakabashi's early season snowfall

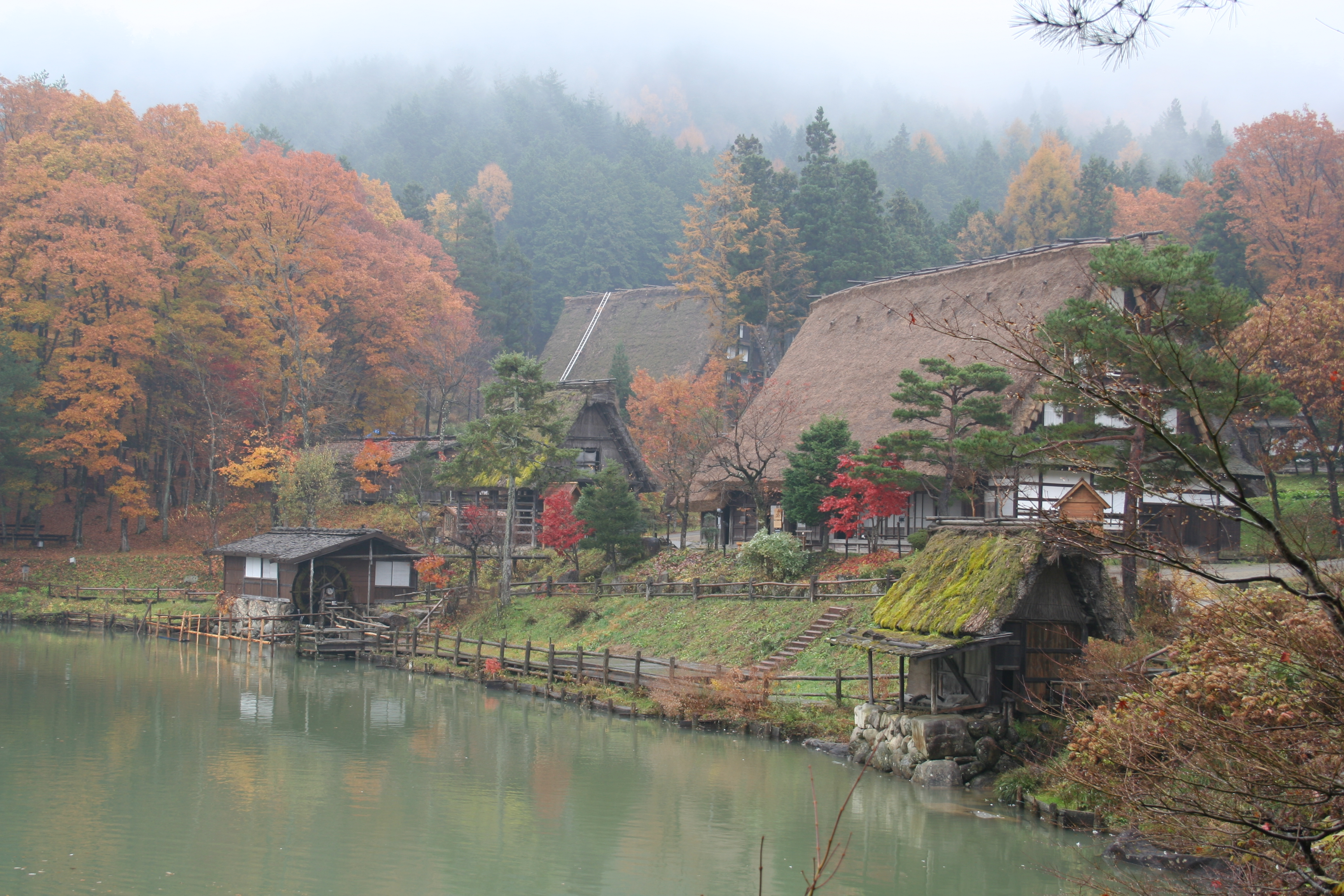
Hida-no-Sato folk village in autumn

Municipal Memorial Hall

Takayama Jinya

Kusakabe House

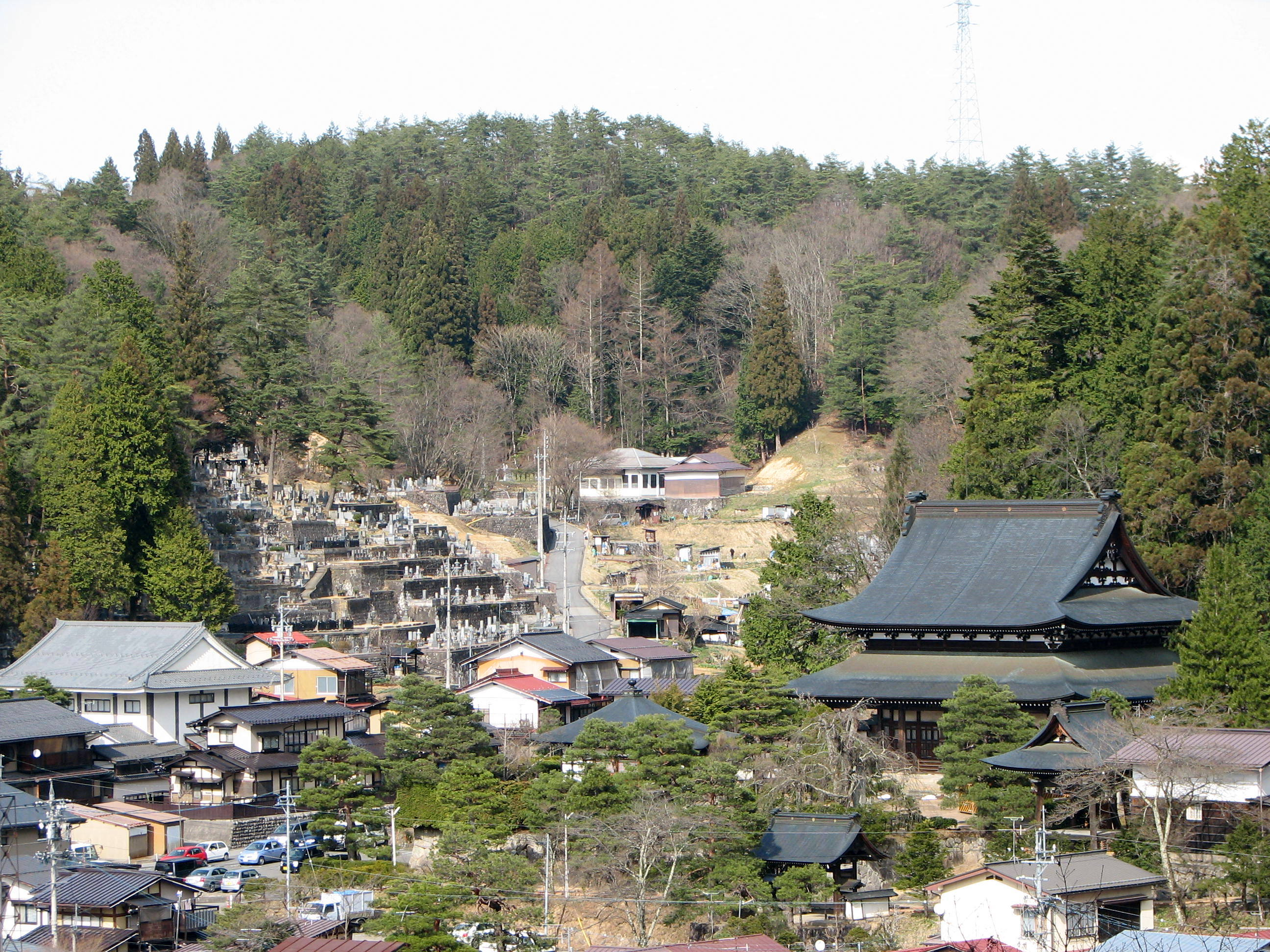
Higashiyama temple area

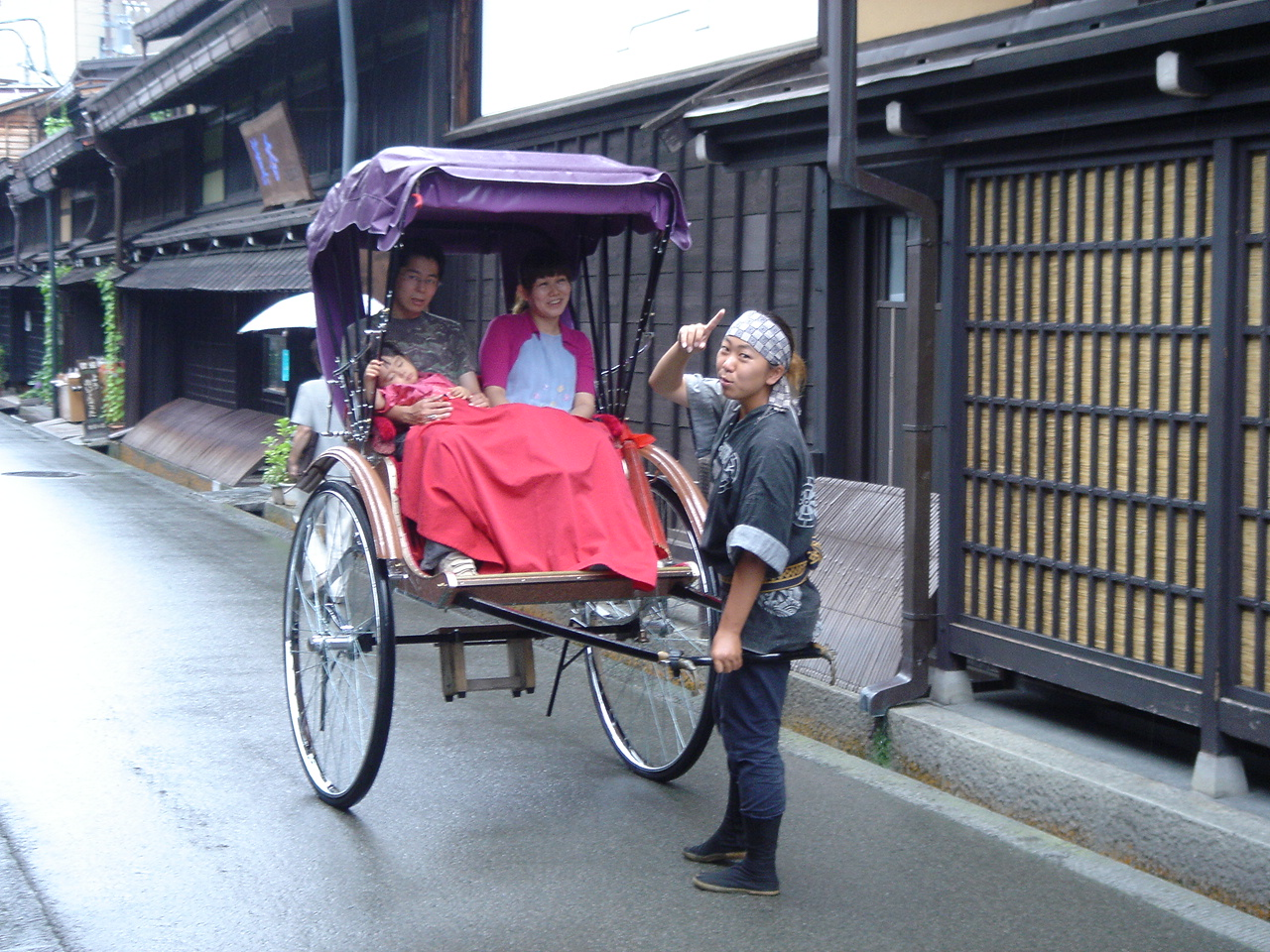
A rickshaw in Takayama

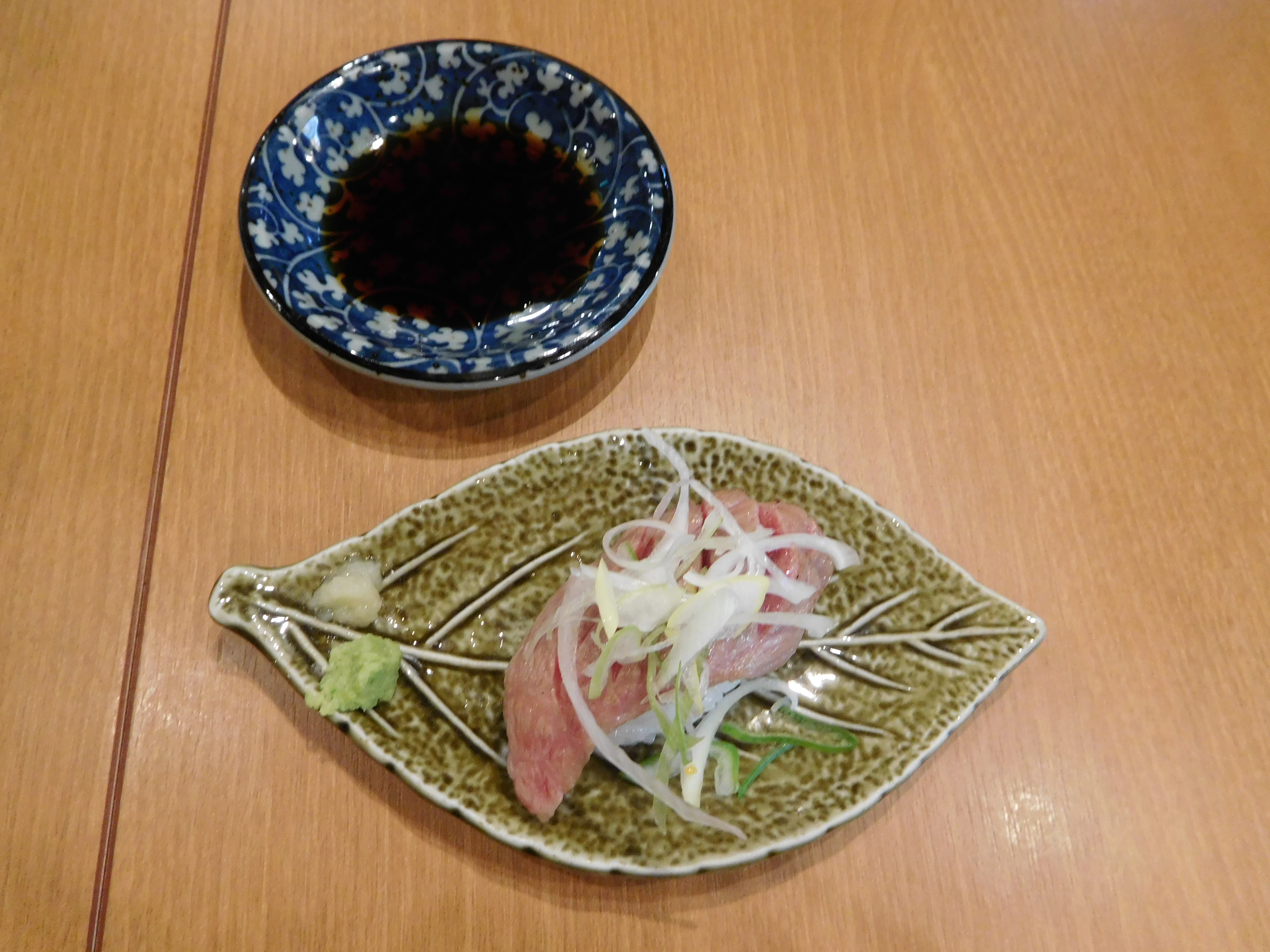
A beef sushi, one of popular foods for tourists

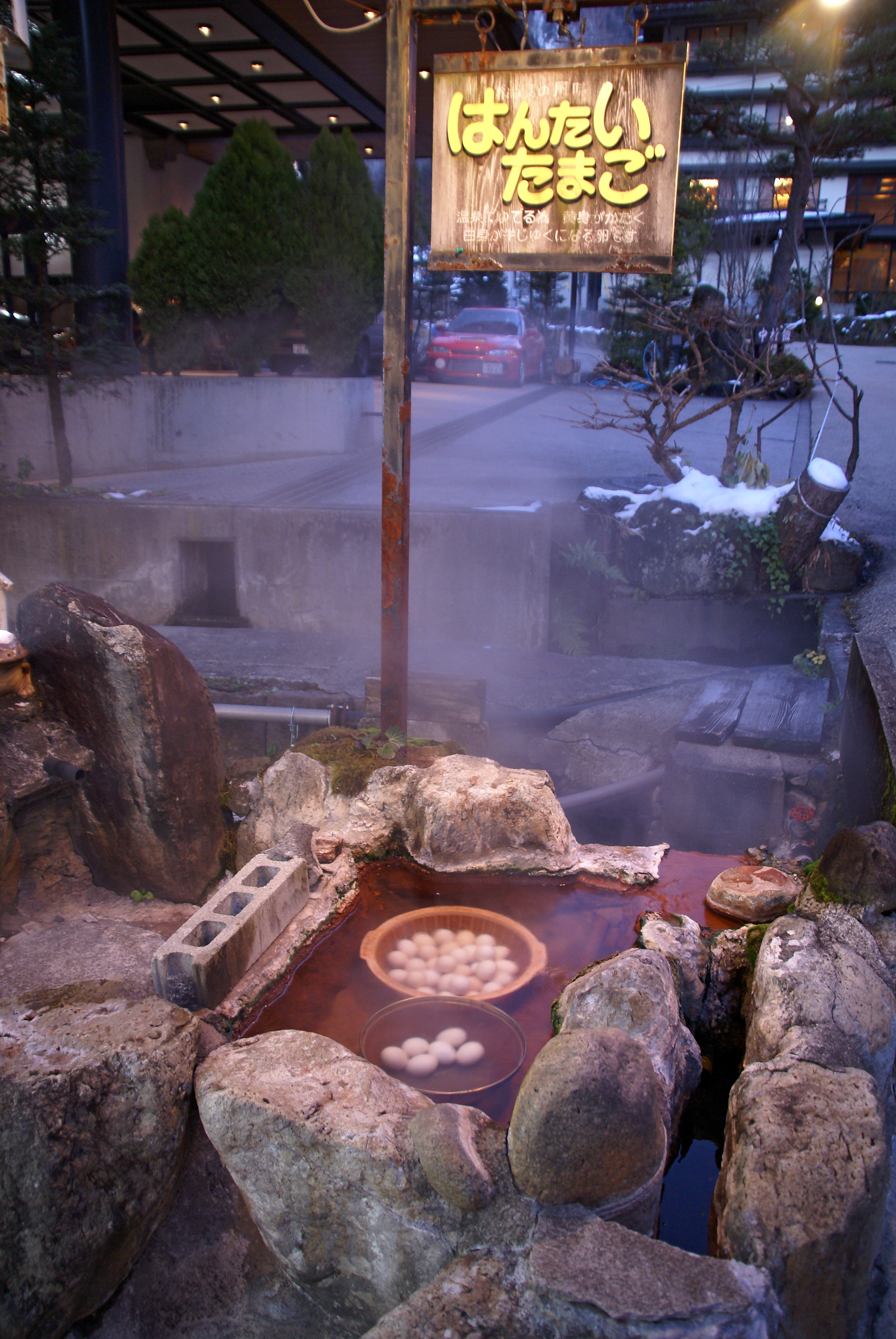
Hirayu onsen Onsen tamago

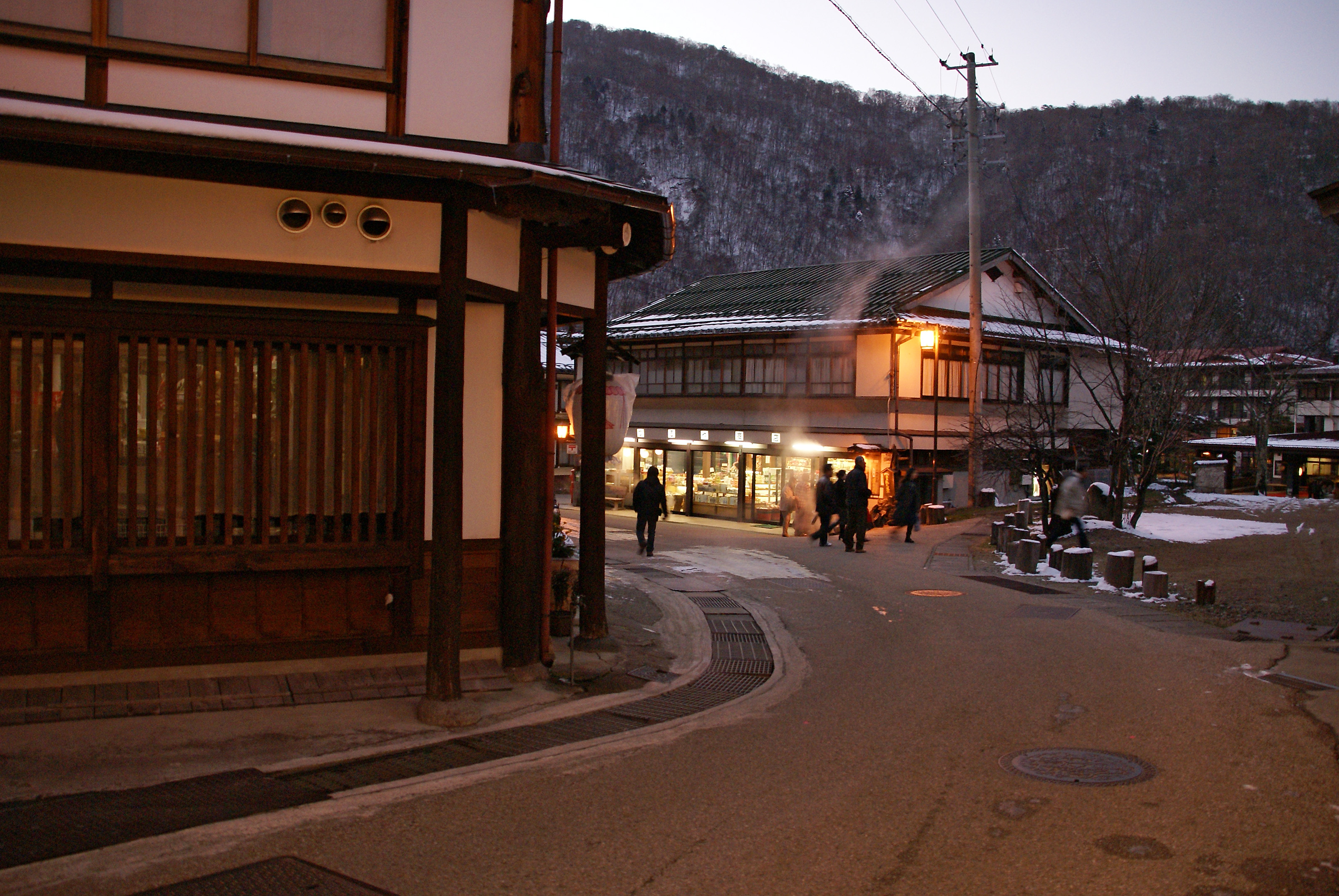
Hirayu onsen

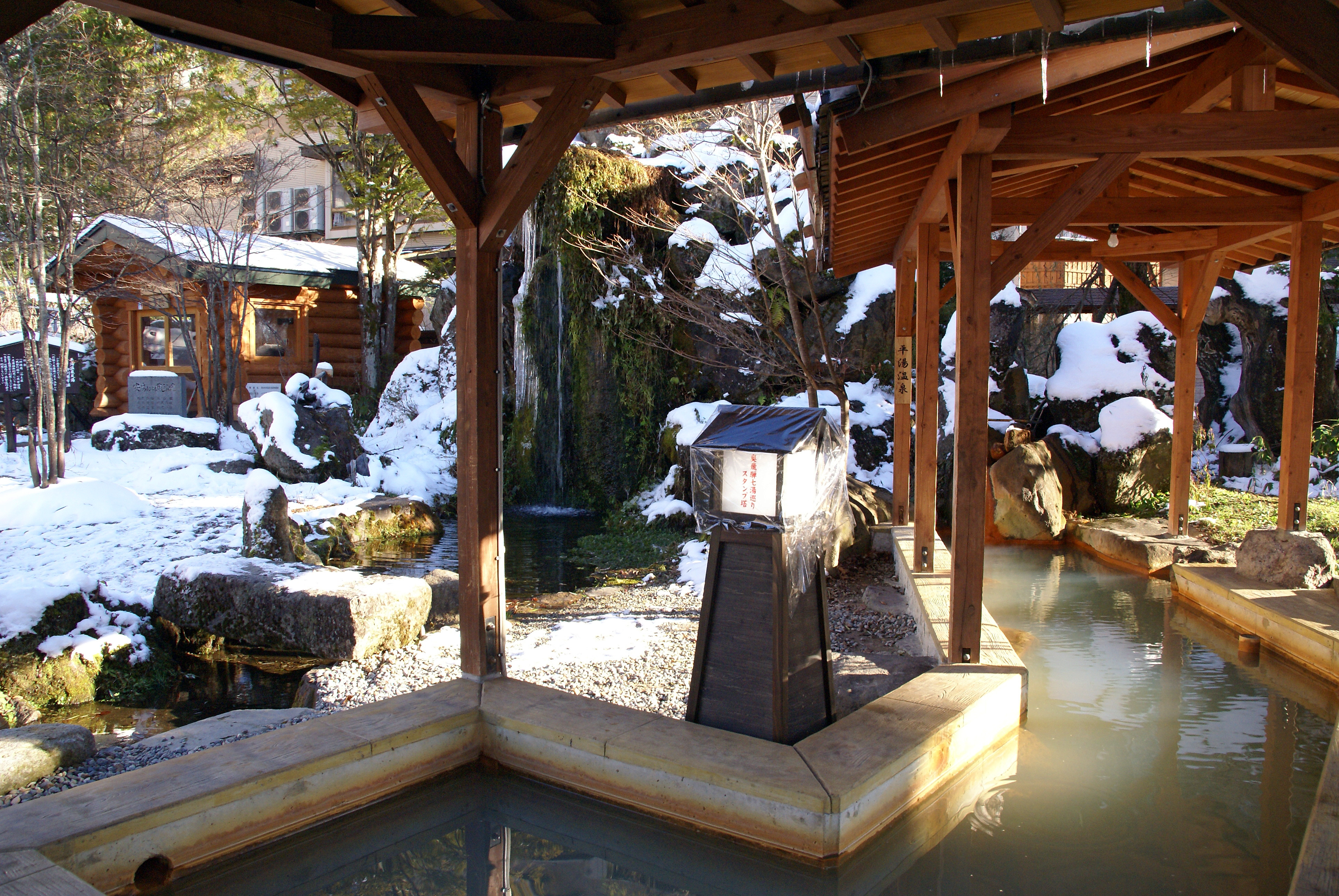
Hirayu onsen

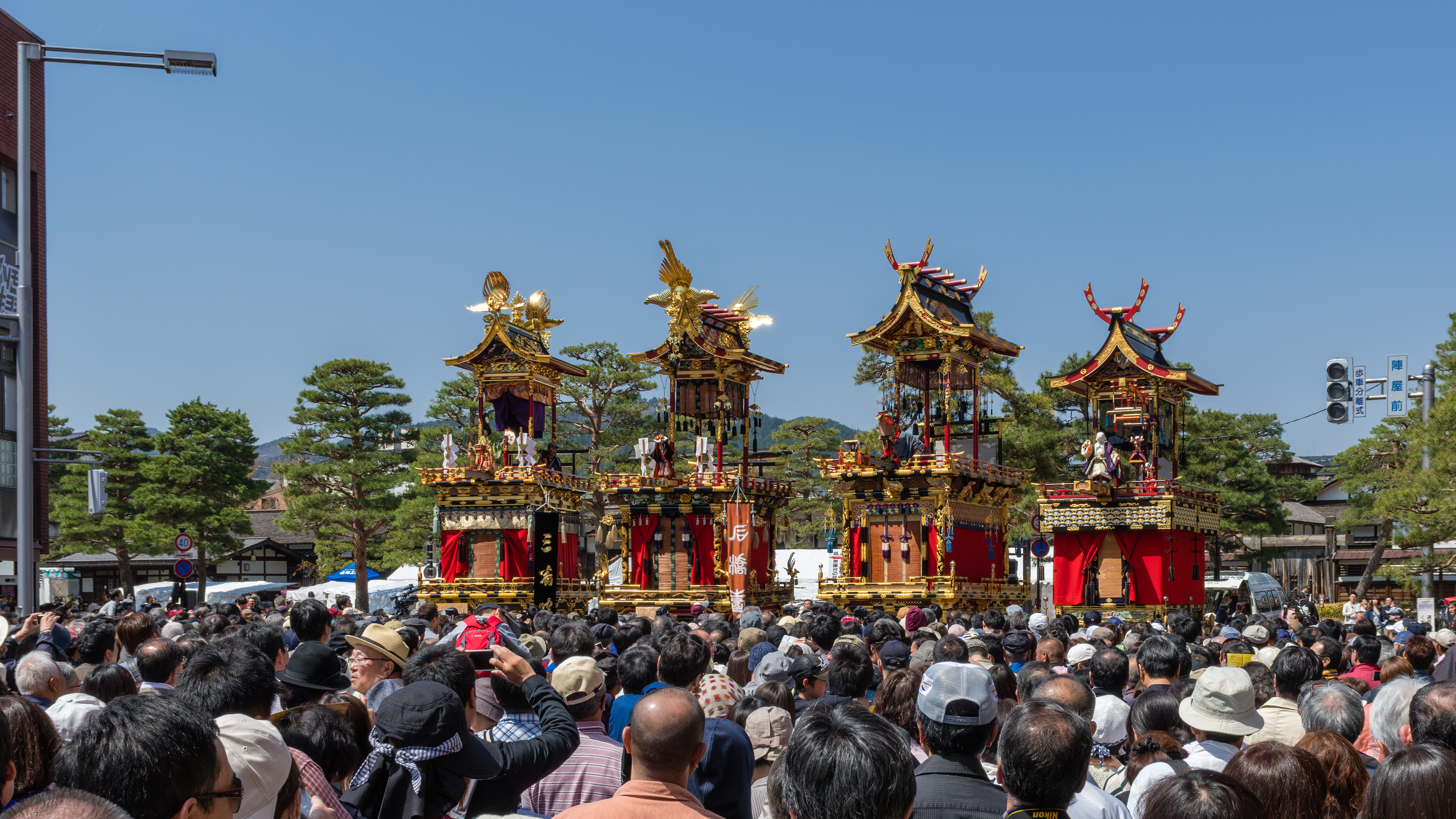
Presentation of floats during Sannō Matsuri

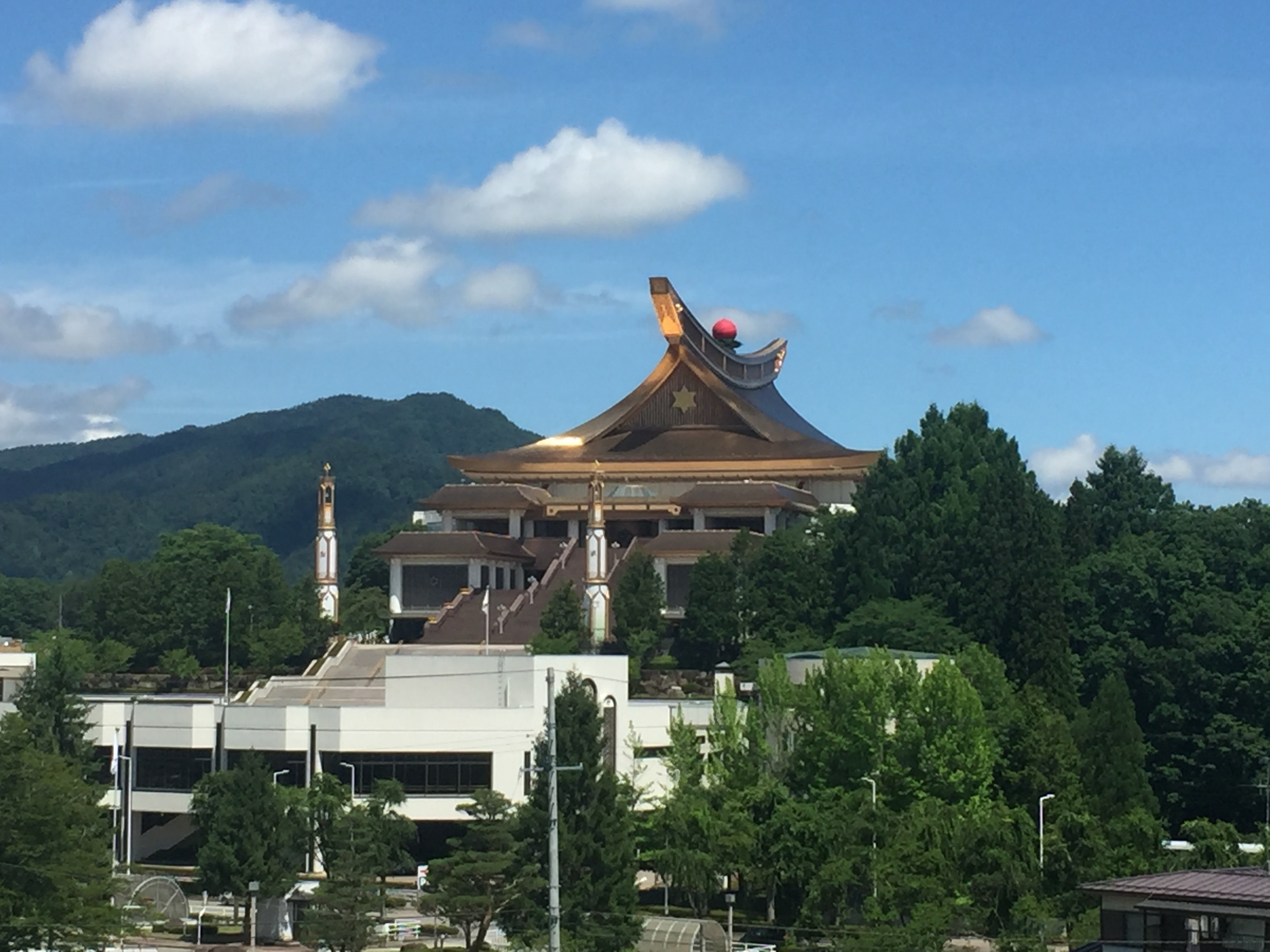
World Shrine of Sukyo Mahikari

== Culture ==
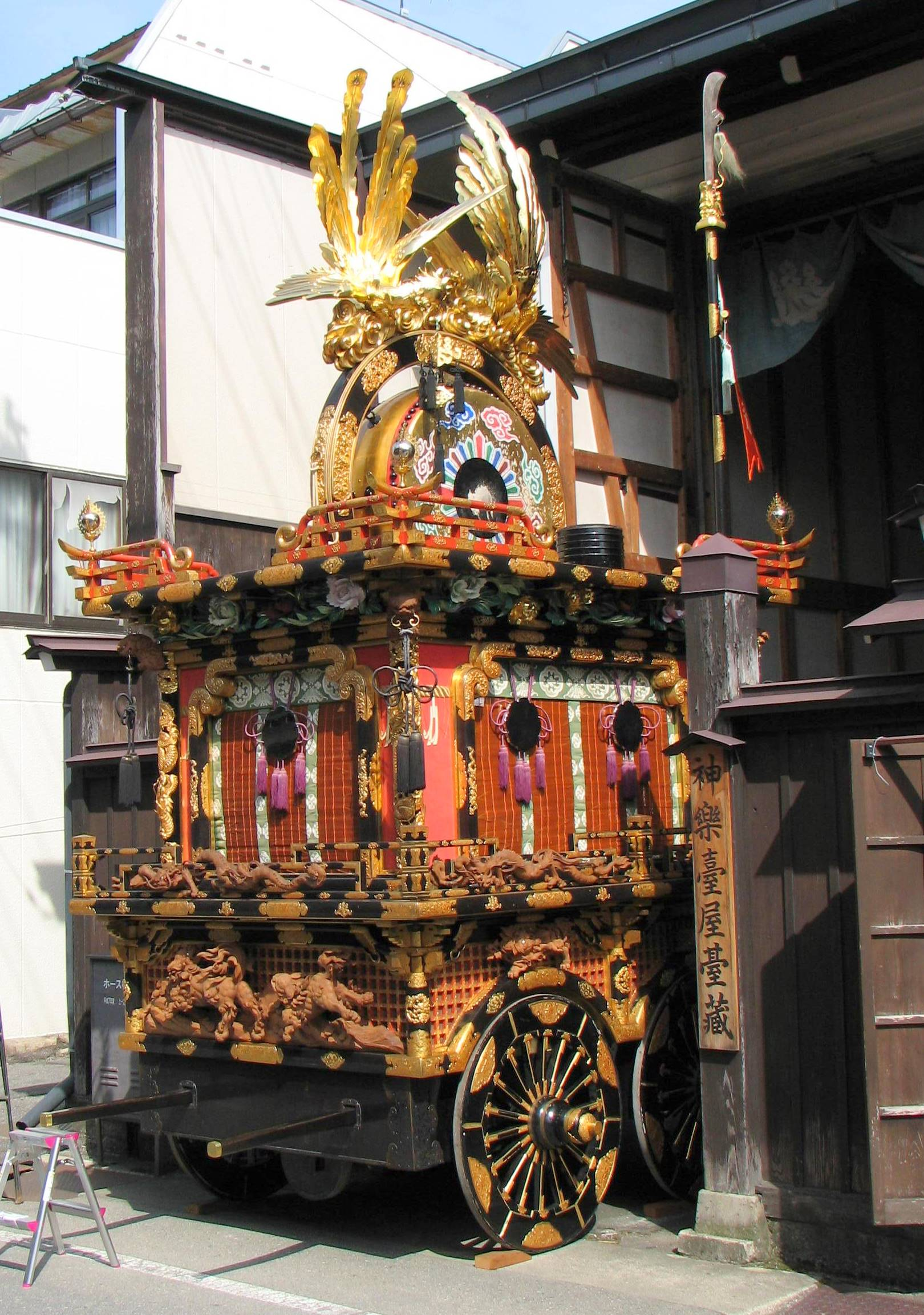
Takayama Matsuri float

- Takayama is known for its local foods, including sansai (mountain vegetables), wasakana (river fish), beef, soba, ramen, and sake.
- In addition to its fame for its carpentry, Takayama is well known for its lacquerware, pottery, and furniture.
- Takayama is associated with charms known as "sarubobos", which are traditionally passed from grandmothers to grandchildren and mothers to daughters, though are now often sold as souvenirs. The city and the Hida area are also known for carpentry, and its carpenters are called Hida no takumi.
- Around the east of the city is a tour, called the Higashiyama Walking Course (東山歩行道, Higashiyama-hokōdō), which goes past many shrines and temples to Shiroyama Park (城山公園, Shiroyama-kōen).
- Takayama holds two festivals every year, Sannō Matsuri (山王祭り) in spring and Hachiman Matsuri (八幡祭り) in autumn. These festivals are among the most popular in Japan.

== In popular culture ==
Takayama was the basis for the settings in the anime series Hyouka, adapted from Honobu Yonezawa's Classic Literature Club series. Designs of the fictional city of Kamiyama are based on Takayama.

A restaurant in Takayama was featured in the 2016 animated film Your Name.

== Notable people ==
- Hisako Nakamura (1897–1968) – artist and author

== See also ==
- Takayama Festival
