= Hida-Kokufu Station =

Railway station in Takayama, Gifu Prefecture, Japan

Hida-Kokufu Station 飛騨国府駅
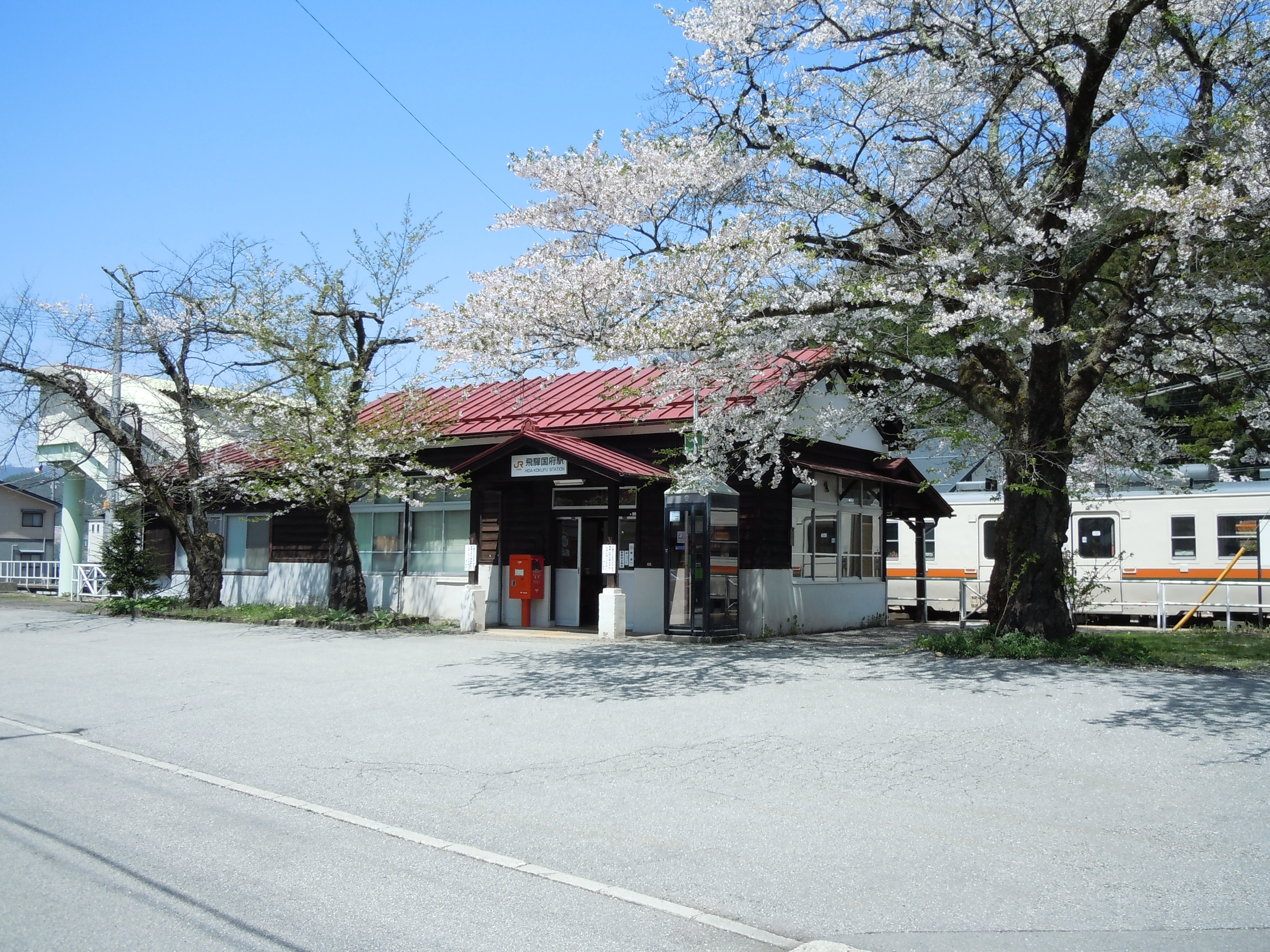
- Hida-Kokufu Station in April 2012

General information
- Location: Kokufu Hirose-cho, Takayama-shi, Gifu-ken 509-4119; Japan
- Coordinates: 36.2111°N 137.2153°E
- Operator: JR Central
- Line: Takayama Main Line
- Distance: 147.6 km from Gifu
- Platforms: 2 side platforms
- Tracks: 2

Other information
- Status: Unstaffed

History
- Opened: October 25, 1934

Passengers
- FY2015: 22 daily
Location
- Location within Gifu Prefecture Location within Japan

Hida-Kokufu Station (飛騨国府駅, Hida-Kokufu-eki) is a railway station on the Takayama Main Line in the city of Takayama, Gifu Prefecture, Japan, operated by Central Japan Railway Company (JR Central).

== Lines ==
Hida-Kokufu Station is served by the JR Central Takayama Main Line, and is located 147.6 kilometers from the official starting point of the line at Gifu.

== Station layout ==
Hida-Kokufu Station has two opposed ground-level side platforms connected by a footbridge. The station is unattended.

=== Platforms ===
1	■ Takayama Main Line	for Toyama
2	■ Takayama Main Line	for Takayama and Gero

== Adjacent stations ==
«	Service	»
Takayama Main Line
Limited Express "Hida": Does not stop at this station
Hozue	Local	Hida-Furukawa

== History ==
Hida-Kokufu Station opened on October 25, 1934. The station was absorbed into the JR Central network upon the privatization of Japanese National Railways (JNR) on April 1, 1987.

== Surrounding area ==
- Takayama Kokufu Junior High School

== See also ==
- List of railway stations in Japan
