= Ōno District =

District in Gifu Prefecture, Japan

Coordinates: 36.210°N 136.869°E

Location of Shirakawa village in Gifu Prefecture

Ōno (大野郡, Ōno-gun) is a district located in Gifu Prefecture, Japan.

The district is in a mountainous region near the geographic centre of Japan. Prior to February 1, 2005, the district comprised seven small communities, but on that day six of them merged into the expanded city of Takayama. Ōno district now contains only the village of Shirakawa, which is declining to merge with any municipality.

As of July 2011, and counting only the village of Shirakawa, the district has an estimated population of 1,734. The total area is 356.55 km^{2}.

The district has only one village left.

- Shirakawa

== District timeline ==
- April 1, 1950 - The district acquired the villages of Asahi and Takane from now defunct Mashita District.
- On February 1, 2005 - The towns and villages of Asahi, Kiyomi, Kuguno, Miya, Nyūkawa, Shōkawa and Takane merged into the expanded city of Takayama.
