= Yoshiki District, Gifu =

Former district in Gifu prefecture, Japan

Yoshiki District (吉城郡, Yoshiki-gun) was a district located in Gifu Prefecture, Japan. The district was dissolved on February 1, 2005, when the town and village in the district merged into the expanded city of Takayama.

As of 2003, the district had an estimated population of 11,938 and a density of 21.16 persons per km^{2}. The total area was 564.17 km^{2}.

== District Timeline ==
On February 1, 2004, the towns of Furukawa and Kamioka and the villages of Kawai and Miyagawa merged to form the city of Hida.

On February 1, 2005, the following town and village in the district, before merging in Takayama, were:

- Kamitakara
- Kokufu
