= List of dams in Toyama Prefecture =

The following is a list of dams in Toyama Prefecture, Japan.

== List ==
Name	Location	Started	Opened	Height	Length	Image	DiJ number
Akao Dam		1939	1978	29.2 m (96 ft)			0861
Akasofu Tameike Dam		1932	1945	31.9 m (105 ft)	200.2 m (657 ft)		0828
Arimine Dam		1960	1959	140 m (460 ft)			0841
Asahi Ogawa Dam				84 m (276 ft)			0878
Dashidaira Dam		1985	1985	76.7 m (252 ft)	136 m (446 ft)		0881
Fujiga-ike Dam		1946	1950	18.2 m (60 ft)	129 m (423 ft)		0832
Funagawa Dam		2012		49.8 m (163 ft)			3204
Furudo Dam		1968	1982	32 m (105 ft)	154 m (505 ft)		0866
Fusegawa Dam				58.5 m (192 ft)			0876
Futomi Dam		1963	1965	30.5 m (100 ft)	59 m (194 ft)		0851
Goi Dam		1974	1992	57 m (187 ft)	230 m (750 ft)		0872
Hanyu-ohike Dam		1989	1993	15 m (49 ft)	126 m (413 ft)		0830
Harayama Dam			1939	18.5 m (61 ft)	45 m (148 ft)		3423
Horinji Dam		1953	1955	15.8 m (52 ft)	86 m (282 ft)		3427
Jatani-ike Dam			1949	19 m (62 ft)	87 m (285 ft)		0831
Johana Dam				59 m (194 ft)			0877
Jinzukawa No.1 Dam		1951	1954	45 m (148 ft)	344.4 m (1,130 ft)		0836
Jinzukawa No.2 Dam		1952	1953	40 m (130 ft)	336.8 m (1,105 ft)		0837
Jinzukawa No.3 Dam		1953	1954	15.5 m (51 ft)	242 m (794 ft)		0838
Kadogawa Dam		1969	1978	58.5 m (192 ft)	180 m (590 ft)		0862
Kamiichigawa Dam		1959	1964	64 m (210 ft)	146 m (479 ft)		0850
Kamiichigawa No.2 Dam		1971	1985	67 m (220 ft)	205 m (673 ft)		0867
Kitamata Dam		1980	1986	35 m (115 ft)	107 m (351 ft)		0882
Konadegawa Dam		1969	1978	45 m (148 ft)	224 m (735 ft)		0863
Komaki Dam		1925	21 Nov 1930	79.2 m (260 ft)			0816
Koregatani Dam			1968	15.5 m (51 ft)	192.7 m (632 ft)		0855
Koyadaira Dam		1936	1936	54.5 m (179 ft)	119.7 m (393 ft)		0820
Kumanogawa Dam		1970	1984	89 m (292 ft)	220 m (720 ft)		
Kurobe Dam		1963	Jan 1961	186 m (610 ft)			0848
Kubusugawa Dam				95 m (312 ft)			0879
Kubusu No.2 Dam		1937	1941	18.6 m (61 ft)	82.5 m (271 ft)		0823
Kuwanoin-ike Dam			1953	23 m (75 ft)	86 m (282 ft)		0834
Magawa Choseichi Dam		1927	1929	19.1 m (63 ft)	105 m (344 ft)		0817
Mattate Dam		1927	1929	21.8 m (72 ft)	61.2 m (201 ft)		0815
Muromaki Dam		1956	1961	80.5 m (264 ft)	153.1 m (502 ft)		0846
Narude Dam		1943	Nov 1951	53.2 m (175 ft)	190 m (620 ft)		0833
Nakayama Dam		1960	1961	24 m (79 ft)	70.5 m (231 ft)		0847
Nekomata Dam							
Ninbusuiso Dam		1960	1961	19.9 m (65 ft)	42 m (138 ft)		3591
Oguchigawa Dam		1977	1981	72 m (236 ft)	245 m (804 ft)		0864
Ohara Dam		1942	1942	52 m (171 ft)			0824
Ohgayarindo Tameike Dam		1928	1931	19 m (62 ft)	99 m (325 ft)		0826
Omata Dam		1958	1960	37 m (121 ft)	131.5 m (431 ft)		0844
Sakaigawa Dam		1973	1993	115 m (377 ft)			0870
Sakuraga-ike Dam			1954	27 m (89 ft)	432 m (1,417 ft)		0839
Sennindani Dam		1936	1940	47.5 m (156 ft)	77.3 m (254 ft)		0822
Sengoku-ike Dam			1965	32 m (105 ft)	113 m (371 ft)		0852
Senzoku Dam			1974	23.5 m (77 ft)			0860
Shin Nakachiyama Dam		1956	1959	35 m (115 ft)	71.7 m (235 ft)		0842
Shiraiwagawa Dam		1967	1974	50 m (160 ft)	318 m (1,043 ft)		
Shogawa Goguchi Dam		1934	1939	18.5 m (61 ft)			0821
Soyama Dam		4 Oct 1930	1930	73.2 m (240 ft)			0818
Sukenobu Dam		1931	1931	45.5 m (149 ft)	125.5 m (412 ft)		0819
Suganuma Dam		1956	1958	22 m (72 ft)	50 m (160 ft)		0840
Takado Dam		1967	1973	23.2 m (76 ft)	101.5 m (333 ft)		0857
Terao Dam		1967	1973	29.2 m (96 ft)	192.3 m (631 ft)		0856
Toga Dam		1941	1943				
Toga Dam		1989 (Note: Currently under construction)	2031				
Togagawa Dam			Jun 1974	37 m (121 ft)			0858
Tōri Dam		1967	1967	101 m (331 ft)	219.4 m (720 ft)		0853
Usunaka Dam		1975	1993	68.9 m (226 ft)	238 m (781 ft)		0869
Unazuki Dam		Mar 2001	2000	97 m (318 ft)	190 m (620 ft)		0873
Wadagawa Dam		1962	1967	21 m (69 ft)			0854
Wakatsuchi Dam		1958	1960	26 m (85 ft)	68 m (223 ft)		0843
Yatsuo Dam		1961	1963	21 m (69 ft)	82 m (269 ft)		0849
Yomokurou No.1 Ike Dam		1988	1993	24.3 m (80 ft)	113 m (371 ft)		3630
Yutanigawa Dam		1977	2000	63.7 m (209 ft)	176.4 m (579 ft)		0868

== See also ==
- Media related to Dams in Toyama prefecture at Wikimedia Commons
