= Taisetsu Dam =

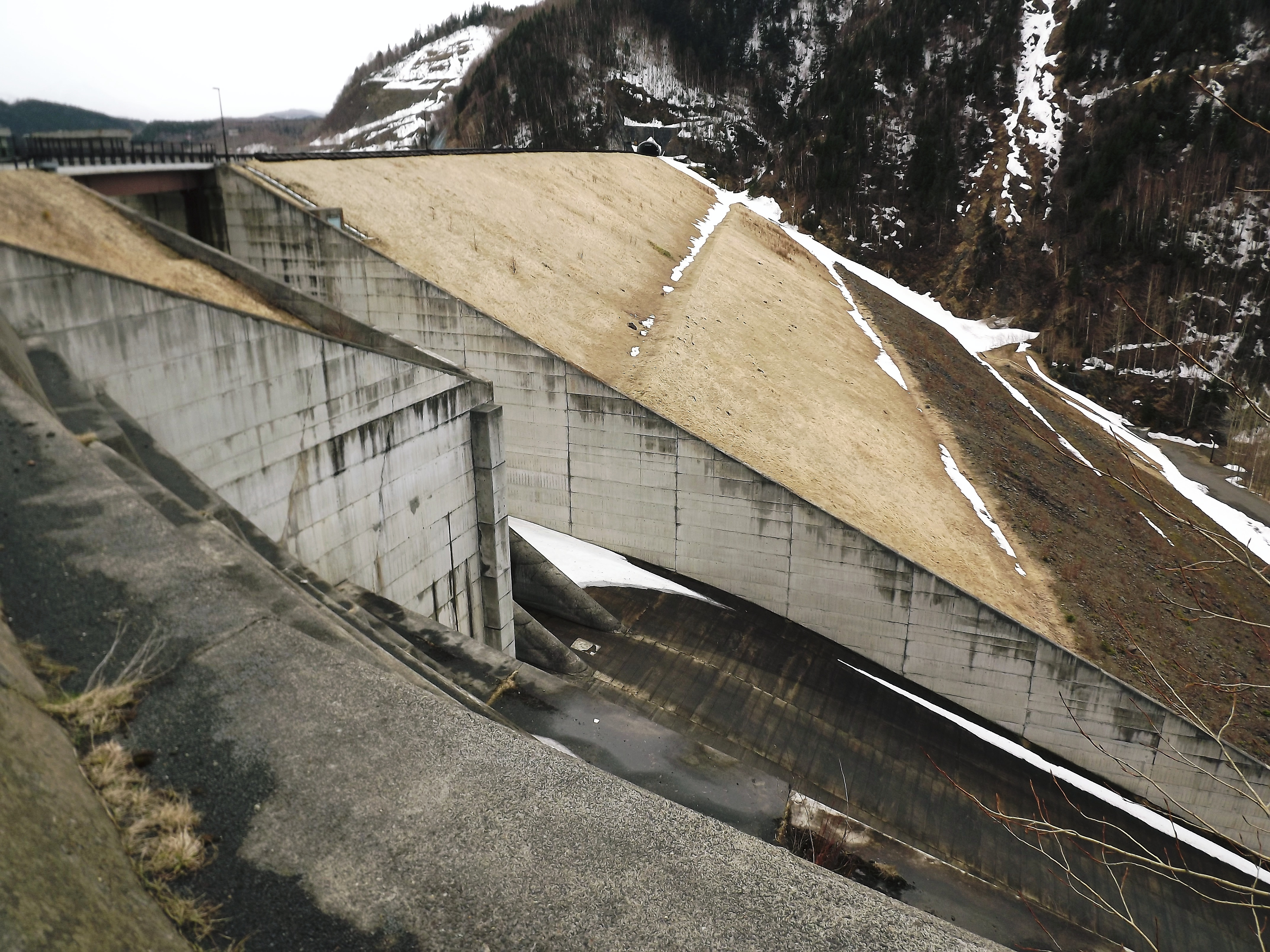
- Interactive map of Taisetsu Dam
- Location: Hokkaido, Japan
- Coordinates: 43°40′35″N 143°02′12″E
- Construction began: 1965
- Opening date: 1975

Dam and spillways
- Impounds: Ishikari River
- Height: 86.5 m
- Length: 440 m

Reservoir
- Total capacity: 66,000,000 m^{3}
- Catchment area: 291.6 km^{2}
- Surface area: 292 hectares

The Taisetsu Dam (大雪ダム) or Taisen Dam is a dam in Hokkaido, Japan. It was planned as a multipurpose rockfill dam by the Hokkaido Ministry of Land, Transportation, Infrastructure Development. It was built upon the Ishikari River for the purpose of flood control and water basin for Asahikawa, Hokkaido, irrigation, and hydropower. The artificial lake created as a result of the construction of the dam is known as the Taisetsu Lake.

== Overview ==
The Ishikari River Comprehensive development plan was formulated in 1947. The plan included a number of dam projects along the main tributaries which resulted in the construction of Ashibetsu Dam as well as Nakayama Dam. In 1954, Typhoon No. 15 known as Typhoon Toyamaru (洞爺丸台風) caused damage to the trees in the Kamikawa Basin, as well as many roads in the surrounding area. A survey of the Ishikari River was conducted and in 1955 and construction of the dam began in 1965. The dam was completed in 1975 after 10 years of construction and has allowed for greater control of flooding and supplies up to 20,000 kW of hydropower. In 1981, another major flood occurred and caused considerable damage to the region. The revision of the Ishikari River comprehensive development plan was required which led to the planning and creation of more dams. In 2007, the Chubetsu Dam was completed as part of this project.
