= Ashibetsu Dam =

Dam in Hokkaidō Prefecture, Japan

Coordinates: 43°17′04″N 142°05′58″E

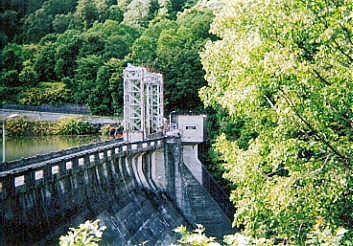
- Interactive map of Ashibetsu Dam
- Location: Ashibetsu, Hokkaidō, Japan

Dam and spillways
- Impounds: Sorachi River

The Ashibetsu Dam (芦別ダム, Ashibetsu damu) is a dam in Ashibetsu, Hokkaidō, Japan, completed in 1952.

The dam is managed by the Ministry of Land, Infrastructure, Transport and Tourism. The dam is a 22.8-metre-tall gravity dam. The Ashibetsu Dam was constructed as part of the Katsurazawa Dam project. The construction of the Katsurazawa Dam led to the creation of the artificial lake known as Lake Ashibetsu after which the Ashibestu Dam is named.

== Development ==
After the Second World War, the comprehensive Ishikari River system development plan in Hokkaido was started by the Ministry of Land, Infrastructure, Transport and Tourism in parallel with the electric power generation project. The Ikushunbetsu River and Ashibetsu Rivers were targeted within the scope of the electric power generation project which led to the creation of the dams. The Ashibetsu Dam is the smallest of the dams of the Ishikari River system. It is the only multipurpose dam for irrigation, water supply and electricity generation without Flood control aside from the Sarutani Dam located in Nara Prefecture.

== Ashibetsu Lake ==
Ashibetsu Lake is an artificial lake that rests quietly surrounded by a Virgin forest. In recent years, Ashibetsu Lake has become increasingly Sedimented. In dedicated electricity-producing dams, the water intake amount is not affected by the sedimentation, however, where there is a flood control mechanism, sedimentation becomes a problem. The sedimentation rate of the Ashibetsu Dam is approximately 79.8%, which is the highest for any multi-purpose dams. Since the Ashibetsu Dam does not have a flood control mechanism, the rate of sedimentation is not an issue.
