= Mattate Dam =

Dam in Toyama Prefecture, Japan

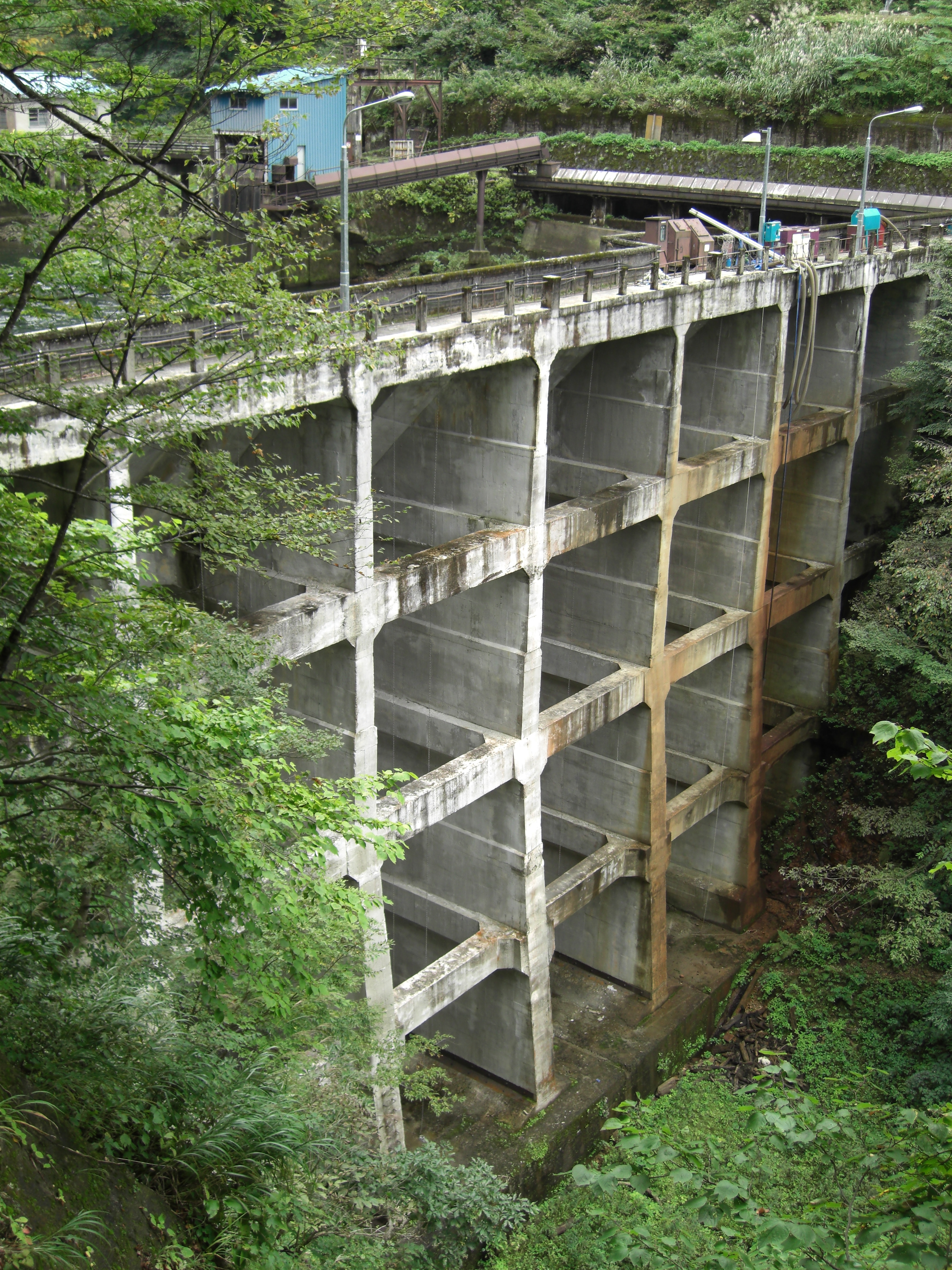

- Location within Japan
- Location: Toyama Prefecture, Japan
- Coordinates: 36°31′24″N 137°23′20″E
- Construction began: 1927
- Opening date: 1929

Dam and spillways
- Height: 21.8 m (72 ft)
- Length: 61.2 m (201 ft)

Reservoir
- Total capacity: 26 thousand cubic meters
- Catchment area: 23 sq. km
- Surface area: 1 hectares

Mattate Dam is a buttress dam located in Toyama prefecture in Japan. The dam is used for power production. The catchment area of the dam is 23 km^{2}. The dam impounds about 1 ha of land when full and can store 26 thousand cubic meters of water. The construction of the dam was started in 1927 and completed in 1929.
