= Wakatsuchi Dam =

Dam in Toyama Prefecture, Japan

- Location within Japan
- Location: Toyama Prefecture, Japan
- Coordinates: 36°33′52″N 137°4′19″E
- Construction began: 1958
- Opening date: 1960

Dam and spillways
- Height: 26 m (85 ft)
- Length: 68 m (223 ft)

Reservoir
- Total capacity: 242,000 m^{3} (8,500,000 cu ft)
- Catchment area: 62.6 km^{2} (24.2 sq mi)
- Surface area: 2 hectares (4.9 acres)

Wakatsuchi Dam is an arch dam located in Toyama prefecture in Japan. The dam is used for power production. The catchment area of the dam is 62.6 km^{2}. The dam impounds about 2 ha of land when full and can store 242 thousand cubic meters of water. The construction of the dam was started on 1958 and completed in 1960.
