= Muromaki Dam =

Dam in Toyama Prefecture, Japan

- Location within Japan
- Location: Toyama Prefecture, Japan
- Coordinates: 36°32′18″N 137°5′30″E
- Construction began: 1956
- Opening date: 1961

Dam and spillways
- Height: 80.5 m (264 ft)
- Length: 153.1 m (502 ft)

Reservoir
- Total capacity: 17000 thousand cubic meters
- Catchment area: 128.3 sq. km
- Surface area: 71 hectares

Muromaki Dam is an arch dam located in Toyama prefecture in Japan. The dam is used for flood control and power production. The catchment area of the dam is 128.3 km^{2}. The dam impounds about 71 ha of land when full and can store 17000 thousand cubic meters of water. The construction of the dam was started on 1956 and completed in 1961.
