= Fujiga-ike Dam =

Dam in Toyama Prefecture, Japan

Fujiga-ike
- Location within Japan
- Interactive map of Fujiga-ike
- Location: Toyama Prefecture, Japan
- Coordinates: 36°38′43″N 137°5′56″E
- Construction began: 1946
- Opening date: 1950

Dam and spillways
- Height: 18.2 m (60 ft)
- Length: 129 m (423 ft)

Reservoir
- Total capacity: 615 thousand cubic meters
- Catchment area: 4.6 sq. km
- Surface area: 10 hectares

Fujiga-ike is an earthfill dam located in Toyama prefecture in Japan. The dam is used for irrigation. The catchment area of the dam is 4.6 km^{2}. The dam impounds about 10 ha of land when full and can store 615 thousand cubic meters of water. The construction of the dam was started on 1946 and completed in 1950.
