= Koyadaira Dam =

Dam in Toyama Prefecture, Japan

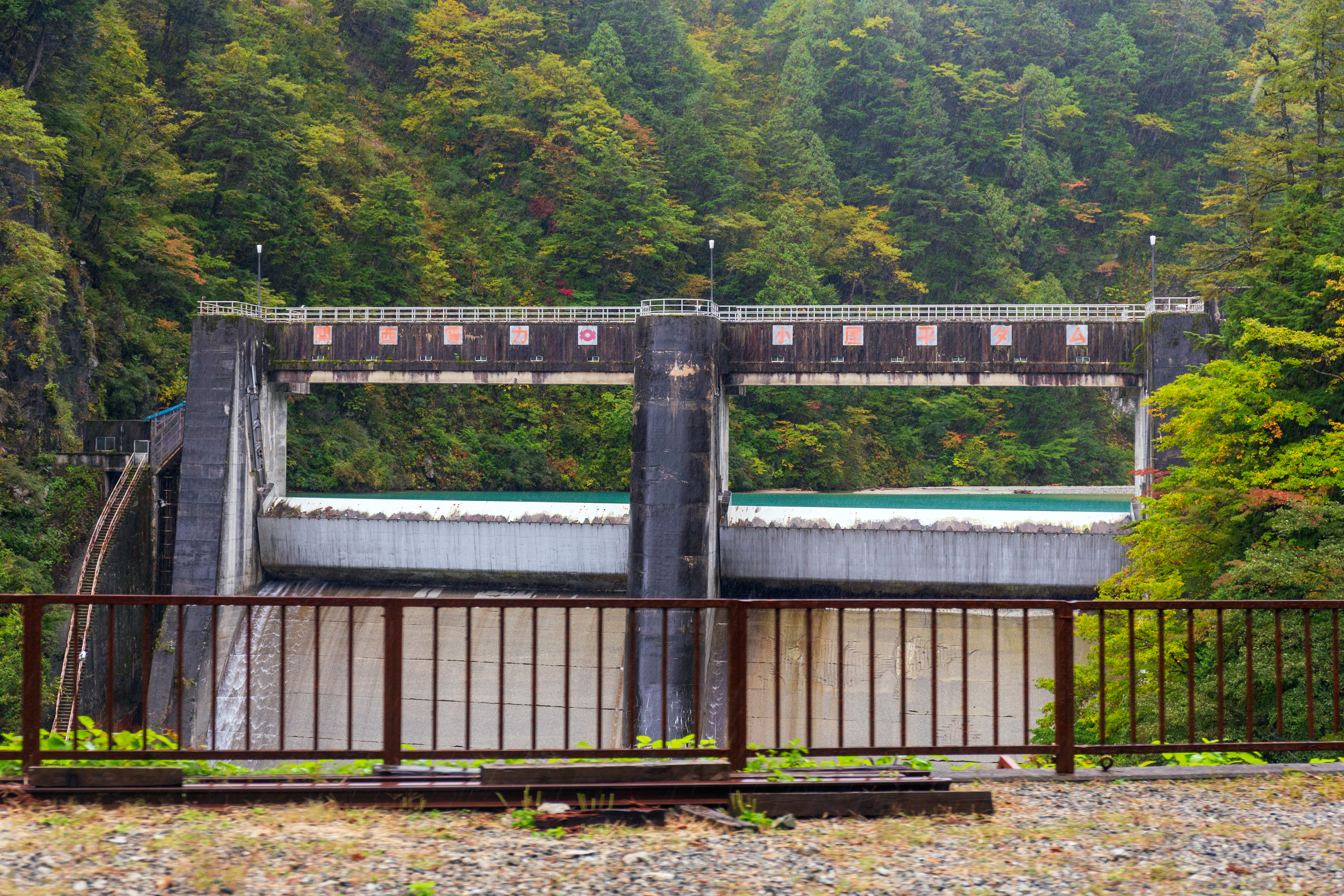

- Location within Japan
- Location: Toyama Prefecture, Japan
- Coordinates: 36°42′36″N 137°38′53″E
- Construction began: 1933
- Opening date: 1936

Dam and spillways
- Height: 54.5 m (179 ft)
- Length: 119.7 m (393 ft)

Reservoir
- Total capacity: 2122 thousand cubic meters
- Catchment area: 404.8 sq. km
- Surface area: 10 hectares

Koyadaira Dam is a gravity dam located in Toyama prefecture in Japan. The dam is used for power production. The catchment area of the dam is 404.8 km^{2}. The dam impounds about 10 ha of land when full and can store 2122 thousand cubic meters of water. The construction of the dam was started on 1933 and completed in 1936.
