= Goi Dam =

Dam in Toyama Prefecture, Japan

- Location within Japan
- Interactive map of Goi Dam
- Location: Toyama Prefecture, Japan
- Coordinates: 36°45′08″N 136°52′54″E
- Construction began: 1974
- Opening date: 1992

Dam and spillways
- Height: 57 m (187 ft)
- Length: 230 m (750 ft)

Reservoir
- Total capacity: 8800 thousand cubic meters
- Catchment area: 13.8 sq. km
- Surface area: 57 hectares

Goi Dam is a rockfill dam located in Toyama prefecture in Japan. The dam is used for irrigation. The catchment area of the dam is 13.8 km^{2}. The dam impounds about 57 ha of land when full and can store 8800 thousand cubic meters of water. The construction of the dam was started on 1974 and completed in 1992.
