= Usunaka Dam =

Dam in Toyama Prefecture, Japan

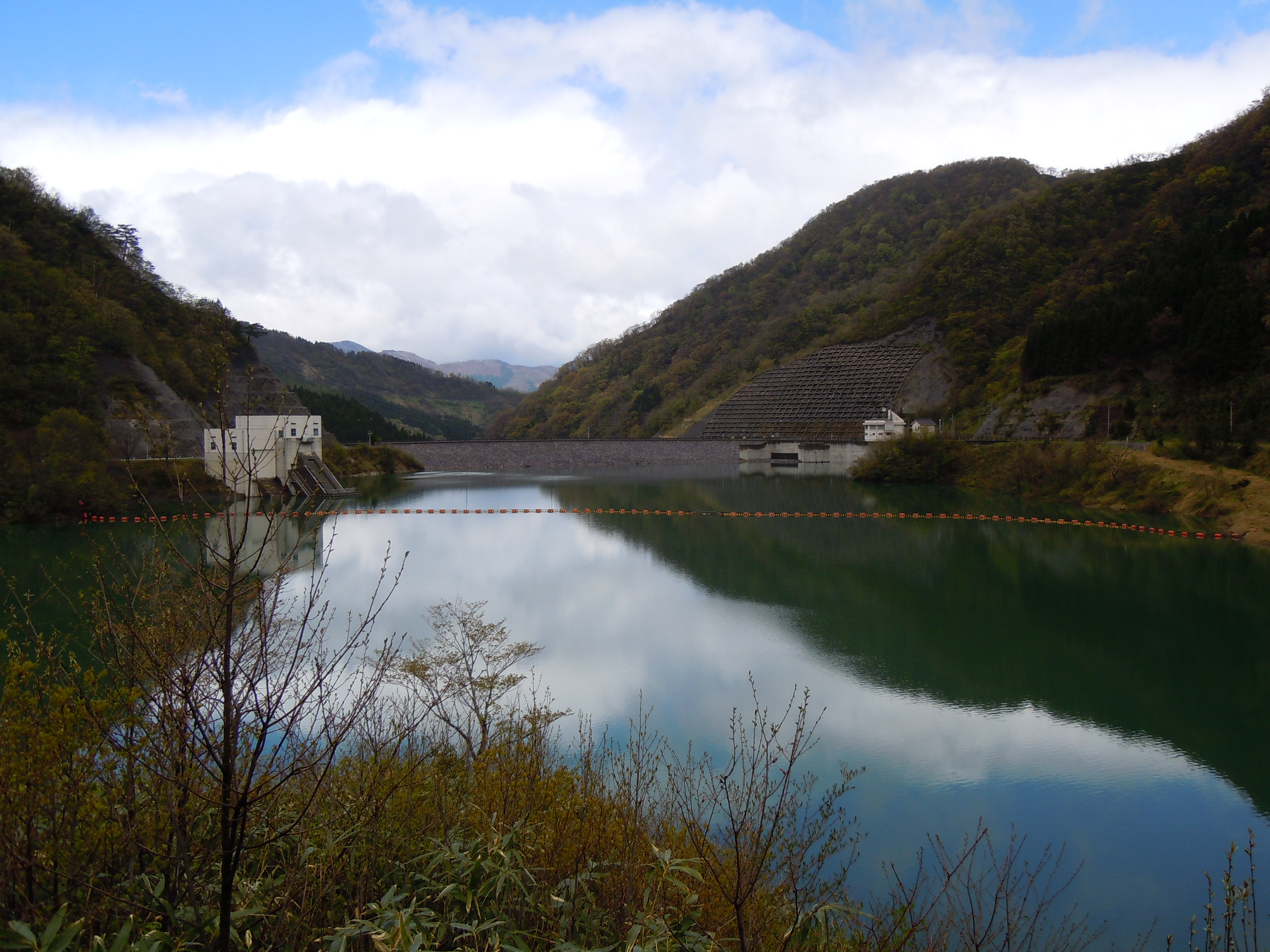

- Location within Japan
- Location: Toyama Prefecture, Japan
- Coordinates: 36°28′07″N 136°51′16″E
- Construction began: 1975
- Opening date: 1993

Dam and spillways
- Height: 68.9 m (226 ft)
- Length: 238 m (781 ft)

Reservoir
- Total capacity: 6,950,000 m^{3} (245,000,000 cu ft)
- Catchment area: 13.5 km^{2} (5.2 sq mi)
- Surface area: 30 hectares (74 acres)

Usunaka Dam is a rockfill dam located in Toyama prefecture in Japan. The dam is used for flood control and irrigation. The catchment area of the dam is 13.5 km^{2}. The dam impounds about 30 ha of land when full and can store 6950 thousand cubic meters of water. The construction of the dam was started on 1975 and completed in 1993.
