= Senzoku Dam =

Senzoku Dam may refer to:

- Senzoku Dam (Kagawa)
- Senzoku Dam (Toyama)
