= Jin-ichi Dam =

Dam in Toyama Prefecture, Japan

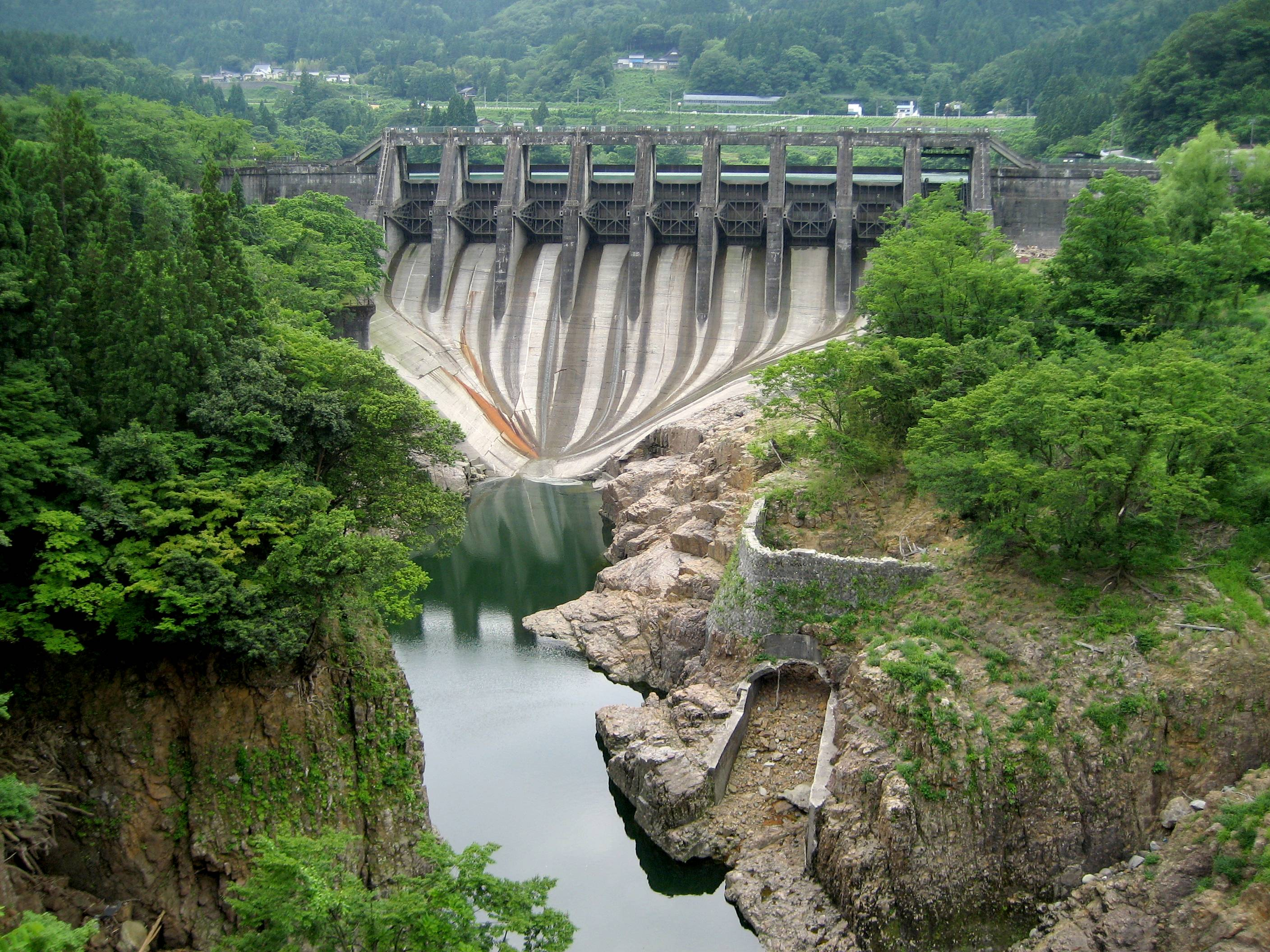

- Location within Japan
- Interactive map of Jin-ichi Dam
- Location: Toyama Prefecture, Japan
- Coordinates: 36°29′45″N 137°14′28″E
- Construction began: 1951
- Opening date: 1954

Dam and spillways
- Height: 45 m (148 ft)
- Length: 344.4 m (1,130 ft)

Reservoir
- Total capacity: 5742 thousand cubic meters
- Catchment area: 1960 sq. km
- Surface area: 78 hectares

Jin-ichi (Jin No. 1 )Dam is a gravity dam located in Toyama prefecture in Japan. The dam is used for power production. The catchment area of the dam is 1960 km^{2}. The dam impounds about 78 ha of land when full and can store 5742 thousand cubic meters of water. The construction of the dam was started on 1951 and completed in 1954.
