= Takado Dam =

Dam in Toyama Prefecture, Japan

- Location within Japan
- Location: Toyama Prefecture, Japan
- Coordinates: 36°53′34″N 136°53′49″E
- Construction began: 1967
- Opening date: 1973

Dam and spillways
- Height: 23.2 m (76 ft)
- Length: 101.5 m (333 ft)

Reservoir
- Total capacity: 433,000 m^{3} (15,300,000 cu ft)
- Catchment area: 2.6 km^{2} (1.0 sq mi)
- Surface area: 6 hectares (15 acres)

Takado Dam is an earthfill dam located in Toyama prefecture in Japan. The dam is used for flood control and irrigation. The catchment area of the dam is 2.6 km^{2}. The dam impounds about 6 ha of land when full and can store 433 thousand cubic meters of water. The construction of the dam was started on 1967 and completed in 1973.
