= Futomi Dam =

Dam in Toyama Prefecture, Japan

- Location within Japan
- Interactive map of Futomi Dam
- Location: Toyama Prefecture, Japan
- Coordinates: 36°28′42″N 136°48′36″E
- Construction began: 1963
- Opening date: 1965

Dam and spillways
- Height: 30.5 m (100 ft)
- Length: 59 m (194 ft)

Reservoir
- Total capacity: 352 thousand cubic meters
- Catchment area: 48.2 sq. km
- Surface area: 5 hectares

Futomi Dam is a gravity dam located in Toyama prefecture in Japan. The dam is used for power production. The catchment area of the dam is 48.2 km^{2}. The dam impounds about 5 ha of land when full and can store 352 thousand cubic meters of water. The construction of the dam was started on 1963 and completed in 1965.
