= Jin-san Dam =

Dam in Toyama Prefecture, Japan

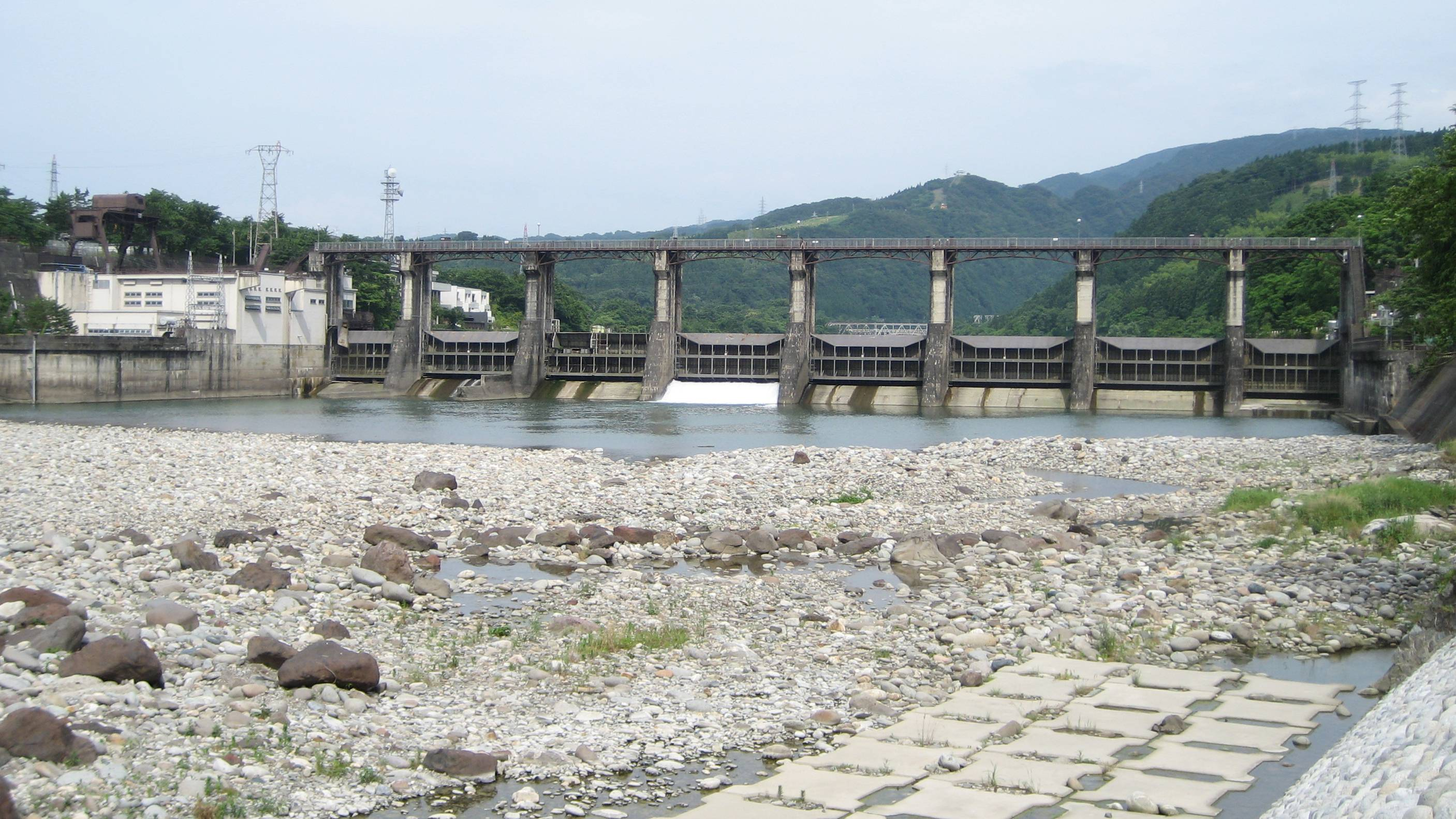

- Location within Japan
- Interactive map of Jin-san Dam
- Location: Toyama Prefecture, Japan
- Coordinates: 36°33′36″N 137°12′07″E
- Construction began: 1953
- Opening date: 1954

Dam and spillways
- Height: 15.5 m (51 ft)
- Length: 242 m (794 ft)

Reservoir
- Total capacity: 1455 thousand cubic meters
- Catchment area: 2063 sq. km
- Surface area: 26 hectares

Jin-san (Jin No. 3) Dam is a gravity dam located in Toyama prefecture in Japan. The dam is used for power production. The catchment area of the dam is 2063 km^{2}. The dam impounds about 26 ha of land when full and can store 1455 thousand cubic meters of water. The construction of the dam was started on 1953 and completed in 1954.
