= Sengoku-ike Dam =

Dam in Toyama Prefecture, Japan

Sengoku-ike
- Location within Japan
- Location: Toyama Prefecture, Japan
- Coordinates: 36°57′24″N 136°59′51″E
- Opening date: 1965

Dam and spillways
- Height: 32 m (105 ft)
- Length: 113 m (371 ft)

Reservoir
- Total capacity: 270,000 m^{3} (9,500,000 cu ft)
- Catchment area: 1.2 km^{2} (0.46 sq mi)
- Surface area: 27 hectares (67 acres)

Sengoku-ike is an earthfill dam located in Toyama prefecture in Japan. The dam is used for irrigation. The catchment area of the dam is 1.2 km^{2}. The dam impounds about 27 ha of land when full and can store 270 thousand cubic meters of water. The construction of the dam was completed in 1965.
