= Tori Dam =

Dam in Toyama Prefecture, Japan

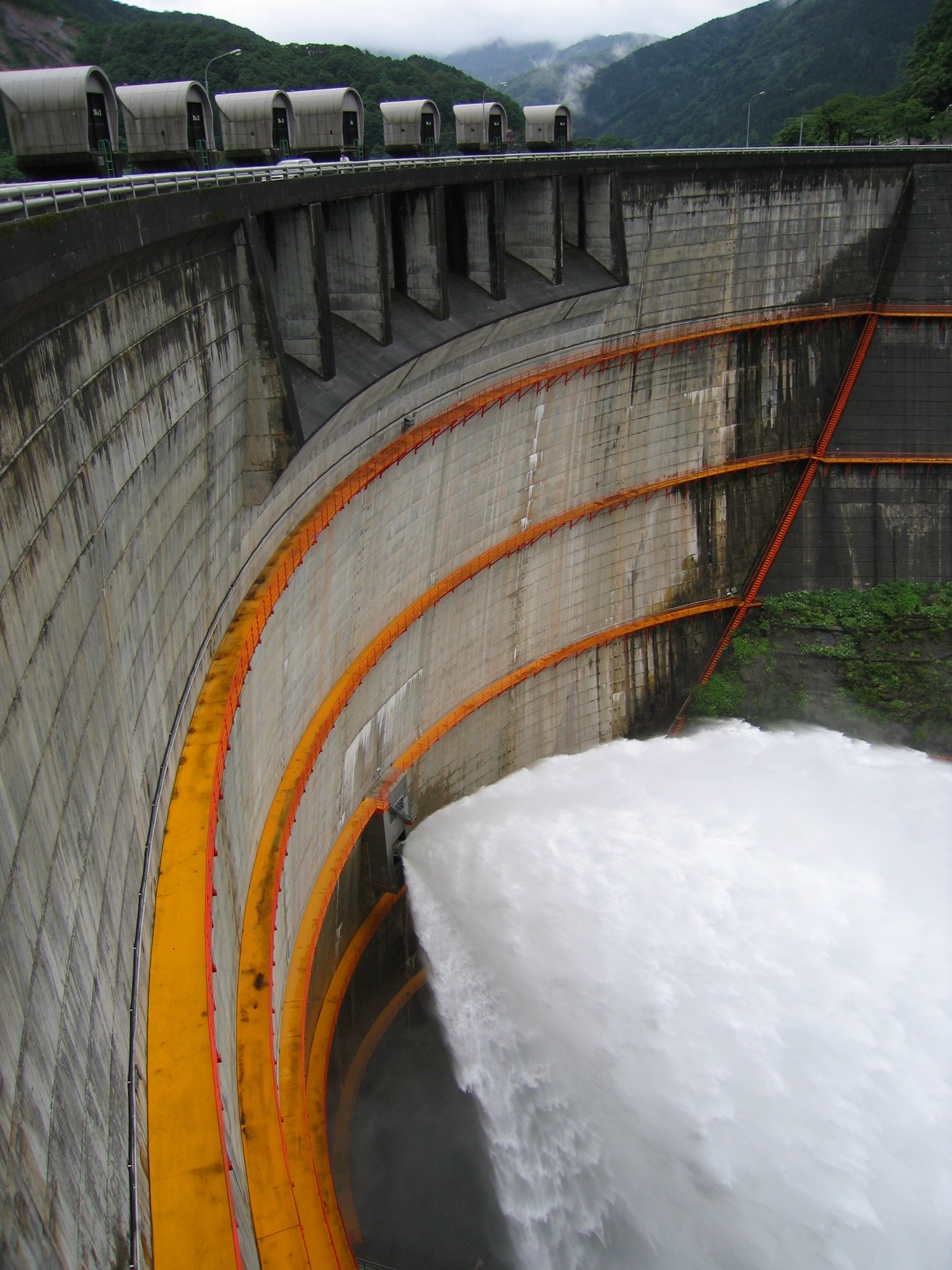

- Location within Japan
- Location: Toyama Prefecture, Japan
- Coordinates: 36°28′11″N 136°48′22″E
- Construction began: 1958
- Opening date: 1967

Dam and spillways
- Height: 101 m (331 ft)
- Length: 219.4 m (720 ft)

Reservoir
- Total capacity: 31,400,000 m^{3} (1.11×10^{9} cu ft)
- Catchment area: 45.9 km^{2} (17.7 sq mi)
- Surface area: 103 hectares (250 acres)

Tori Dam is an arch dam located in Toyama prefecture in Japan. The dam is used for flood control, irrigation and power production. The catchment area of the dam is 45.9 km^{2}. The dam impounds about 103 ha of land when full and can store 31400 thousand cubic meters of water. The construction of the dam was started on 1958 and completed in 1967.
