= Kubusu No.2 Dam =

Dam in Toyama Prefecture, Japan

- Location within Japan
- Location: Toyama Prefecture, Japan
- Coordinates: 36°27′19″N 137°10′40″E
- Construction began: 1937
- Opening date: 1941

Dam and spillways
- Height: 18.6 m (61 ft)
- Length: 82.5 m (271 ft)

Reservoir
- Total capacity: 132 thousand cubic meters
- Catchment area: 41 sq. km
- Surface area: 2 hectares

Kubusu No.2 Dam is a gravity dam located in Toyama prefecture in Japan. The dam is used for power production. The catchment area of the dam is 41 km^{2}. The dam impounds about 2 ha of land when full and can store 132 thousand cubic meters of water. The construction of the dam was started on 1937 and completed in 1941.
