= Omata Dam =

Dam in Toyama Prefecture, Japan

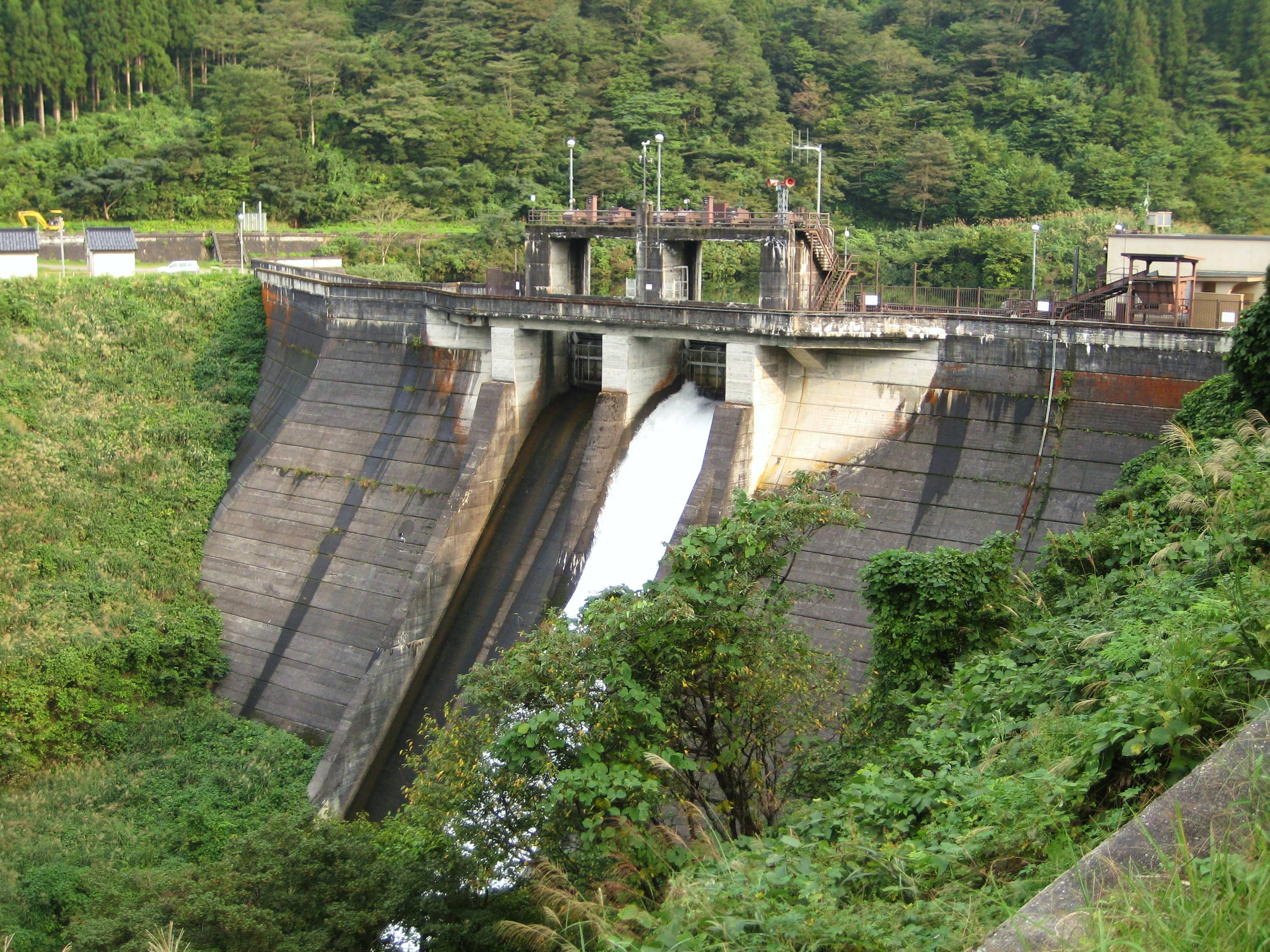

- Location within Japan
- Location: Toyama Prefecture, Japan
- Coordinates: 36°33′50″N 137°22′01″E
- Construction began: 1958
- Opening date: 1960

Dam and spillways
- Height: 37 m (121 ft)
- Length: 131.5 m (431 ft)

Reservoir
- Total capacity: 761,000 m^{3} (26,900,000 cu ft)
- Catchment area: 274.6 km^{2} (106.0 sq mi)
- Surface area: 7 hectares (17 acres)

Omata Dam is a gravity dam located in Toyama prefecture in Japan. The dam is used for power production. The catchment area of the dam is 274.6 km^{2}. The dam impounds about 7 ha of land when full and can store 761 thousand cubic meters of water. The construction of the dam was started on 1958 and completed in 1960.
