= Shiraiwagawa Dam =

Dam in Toyama Prefecture, Japan

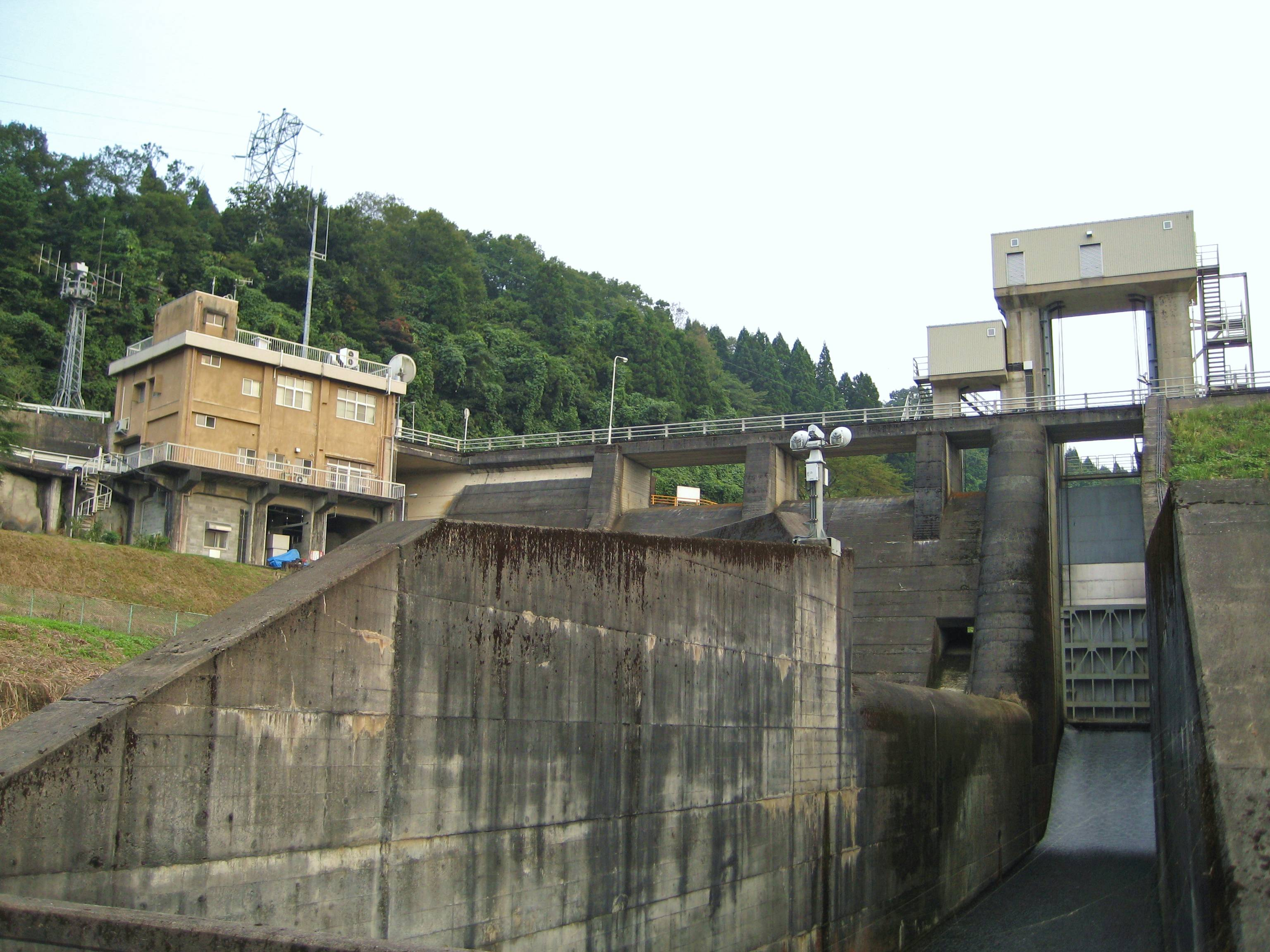

- Location within Japan
- Location: Toyama Prefecture, Japan
- Coordinates: 36°38′21″N 137°21′35″E
- Construction began: 1967
- Opening date: 1974

Dam and spillways
- Height: 50 m (160 ft)
- Length: 318 m (1,043 ft)

Reservoir
- Total capacity: 2,200,000 m^{3} (78,000,000 cu ft)
- Catchment area: 24 km^{2} (9.3 sq mi)
- Surface area: 19 hectares (47 acres)

Shiraiwagawa Dam is a gravity concrete & fill dam (compound) dam located in Toyama prefecture in Japan. The dam is used for flood control and water supply. The catchment area of the dam is 24 km^{2}. The dam impounds about 19 ha of land when full and can store 2200 thousand cubic meters of water. The construction of the dam was started on 1967 and completed in 1974.
