= Yomokurou No.1 Ike Dam =

Dam in Toyama Prefecture, Japan

- Location within Japan
- Location: Toyama Prefecture, Japan
- Coordinates: 36°48′44″N 137°1′31″E
- Construction began: 1988
- Opening date: 1993

Dam and spillways
- Height: 24.3 m (80 ft)
- Length: 113 m (371 ft)

Reservoir
- Total capacity: 124,000 m^{3} (4,400,000 cu ft)
- Catchment area: 0.8 km^{2} (0.31 sq mi)
- Surface area: 2 hectares (4.9 acres)

Yomokurou No.1 Ike Dam is an earthfill dam located in Toyama prefecture in Japan. The dam is used for flood control and irrigation. The catchment area of the dam is 0.8 km^{2}. The dam impounds about 2 ha of land when full and can store 124 thousand cubic meters of water. The construction of the dam was started on 1988 and completed in 1993.
