= Jatani-ike Dam =

Dam in Toyama Prefecture, Japan

Jatani-ike
- Location within Japan
- Interactive map of Jatani-ike
- Location: Toyama Prefecture, Japan
- Coordinates: 36°29′01″N 136°49′54″E
- Opening date: 1949

Dam and spillways
- Height: 19 m (62 ft)
- Length: 87 m (285 ft)

Reservoir
- Total capacity: 360 thousand cubic meters
- Catchment area: sq. km
- Surface area: 3 hectares

Jatani-ike is an earthfill dam located in Toyama prefecture in Japan. The dam is used for irrigation. The catchment area of the dam is km^{2}. The dam impounds about 3 ha of land when full and can store 360 thousand cubic meters of water. The construction of the dam was completed in 1949.
