= Sennindani Dam =

Dam in Toyama Prefecture, Japan

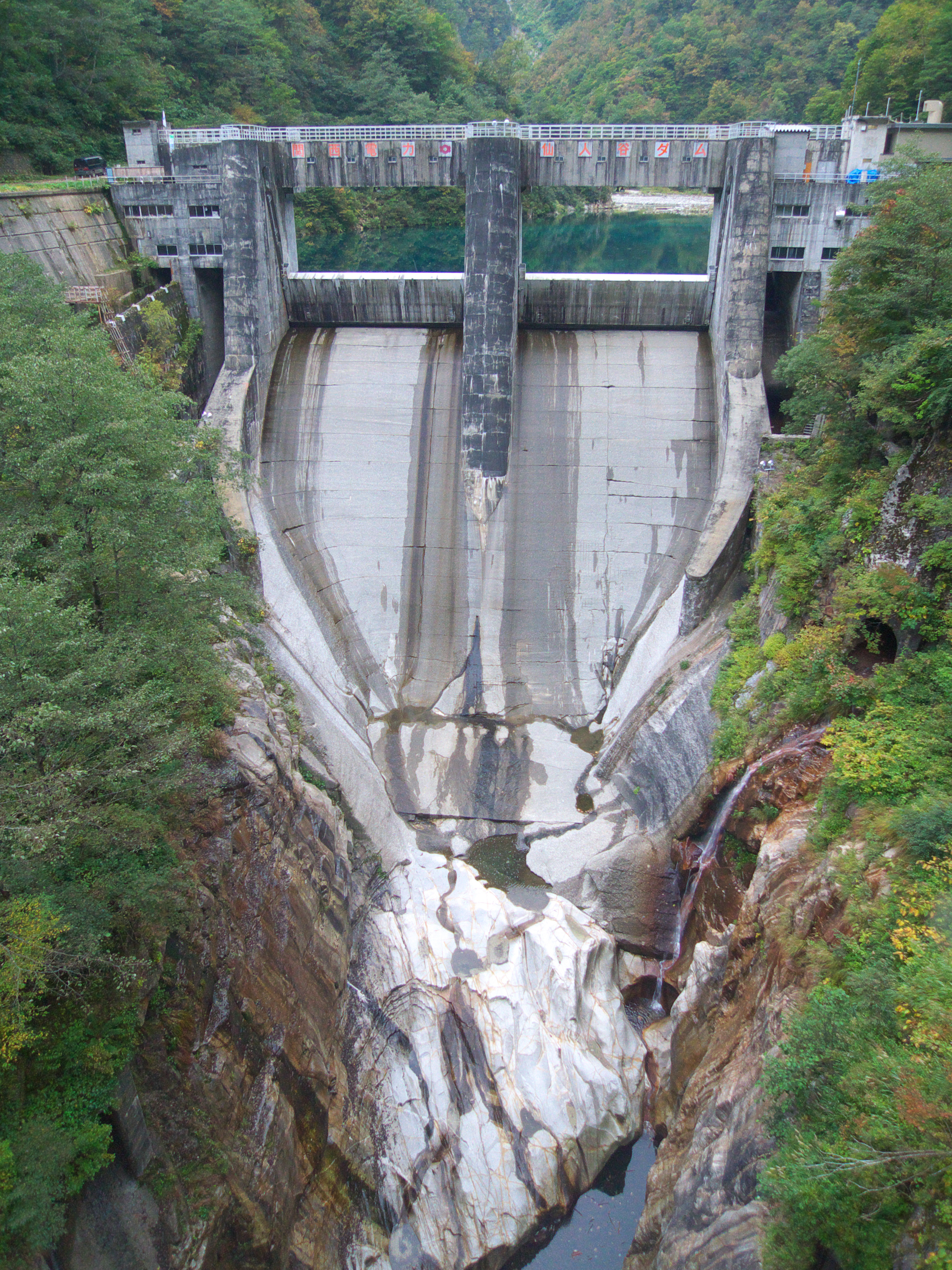

- Location within Japan
- Location: Toyama Prefecture, Japan
- Coordinates: 36°38′58″N 137°40′54″E
- Construction began: 1936
- Opening date: 1940

Dam and spillways
- Height: 47.5 m (156 ft)
- Length: 77.3 m (254 ft)

Reservoir
- Total capacity: 682,000 m^{3} (24,100,000 cu ft)
- Catchment area: 284.1 km^{2} (109.7 sq mi)
- Surface area: 6 hectares (15 acres)

Sennindani Dam is a gravity dam located in Toyama prefecture in Japan. The dam is used for power production. The catchment area of the dam is 284.1 km^{2}. The dam impounds about 6 ha of land when full and can store 682 thousand cubic meters of water. The construction of the dam was started on 1936 and completed in 1940.
