= Kumanogawa Dam =

Dam in Toyama Prefecture, Japan

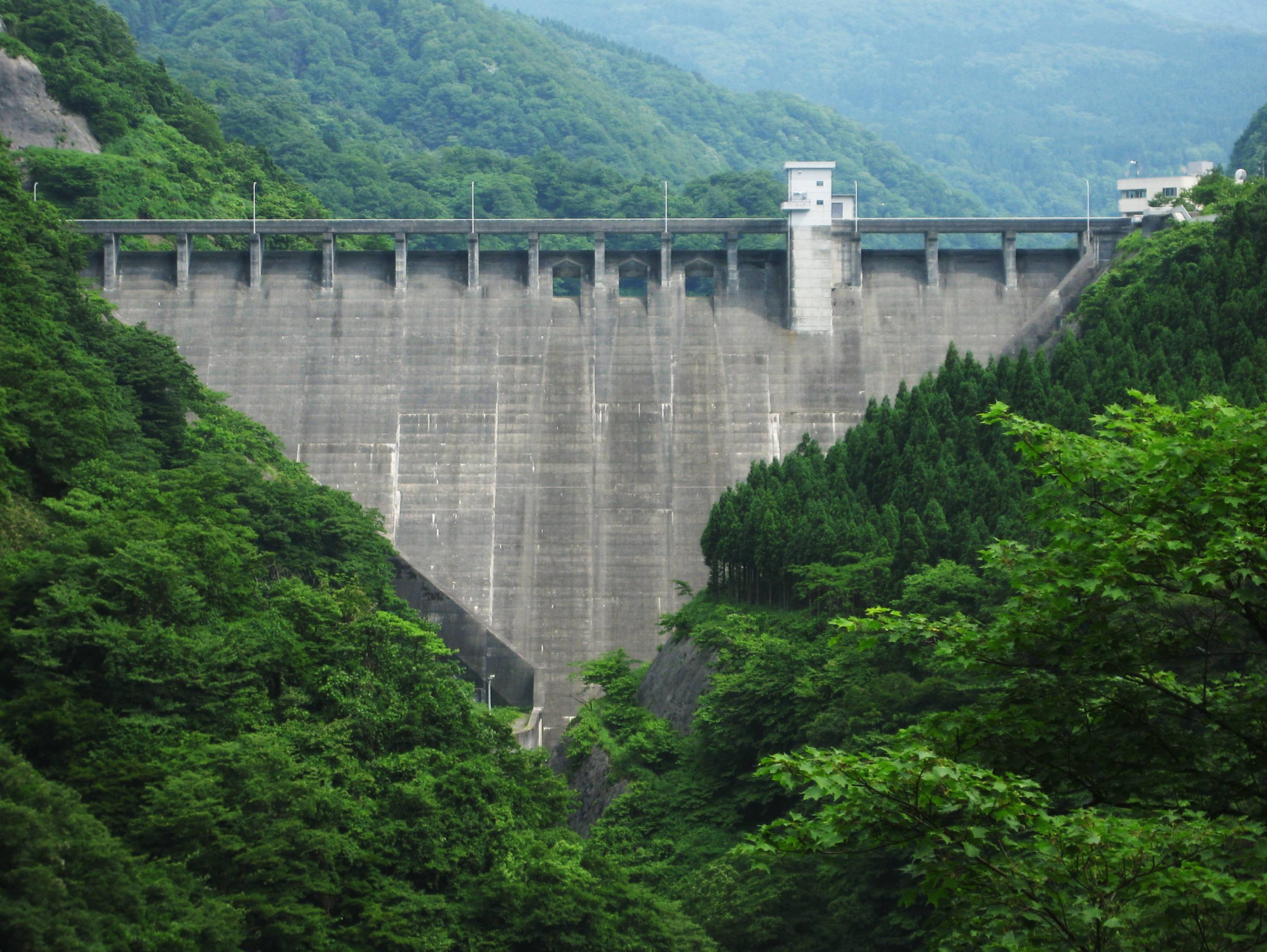

- Location within Japan
- Location: Toyama Prefecture, Japan
- Coordinates: 36°33′39″N 137°18′47″E
- Construction began: 1970
- Opening date: 1984

Dam and spillways
- Height: 89 m (292 ft)
- Length: 220 m (720 ft)

Reservoir
- Total capacity: 9100 thousand cubic meters
- Catchment area: 39.8 sq. km
- Surface area: 34 hectares

Kumanogawa Dam is a gravity dam located in Toyama prefecture in Japan. The dam is used for flood control, water supply and power production. The catchment area of the dam is 39.8 km^{2}. The dam impounds about 34 ha of land when full and can store 9100 thousand cubic meters of water. The construction of the dam was started on 1970 and completed in 1984.
