= Oguchigawa Dam =

Dam in Toyama Prefecture, Japan

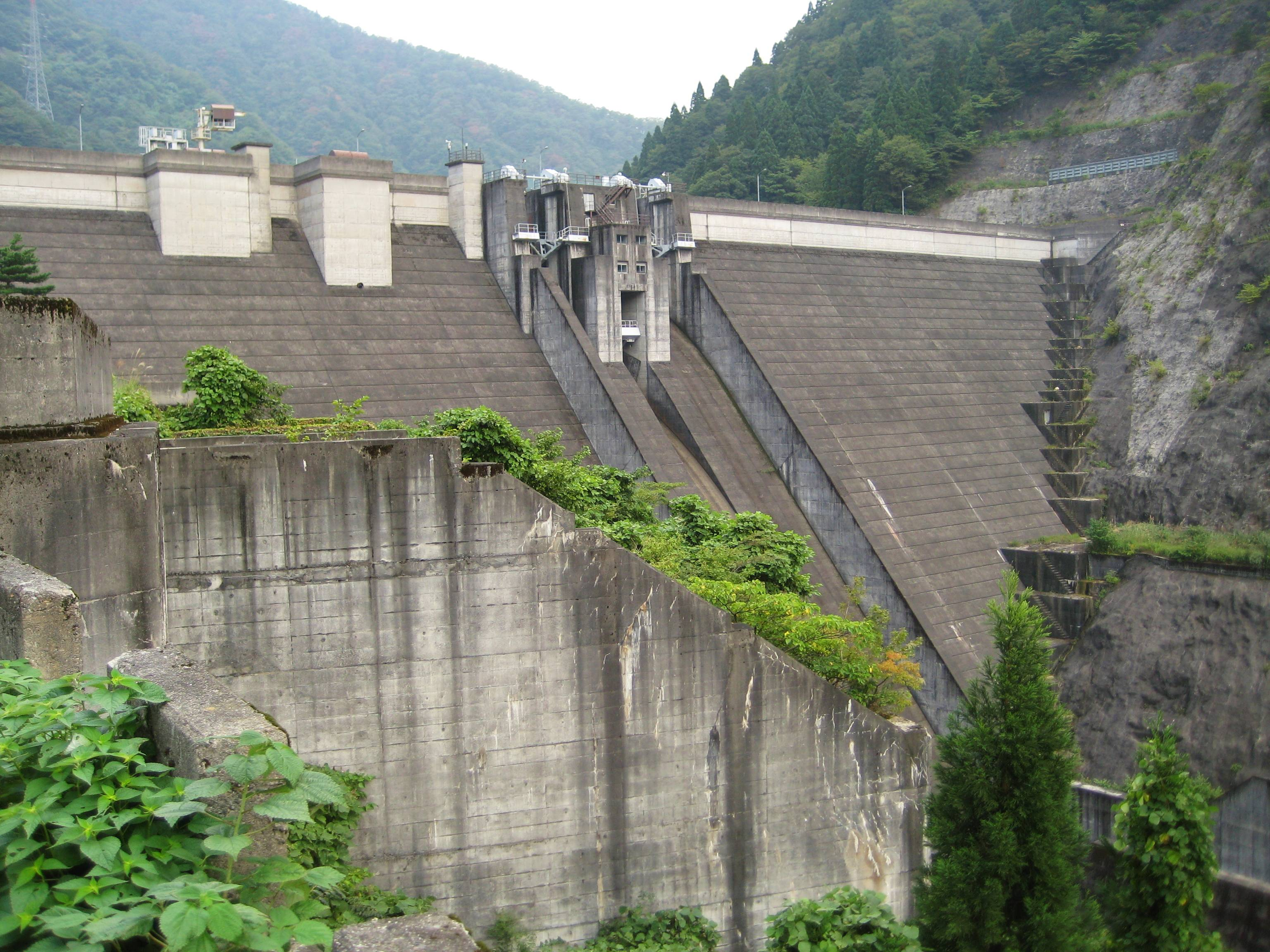

- Location within Japan
- Location: Toyama Prefecture, Japan
- Coordinates: 36°33′01″N 137°21′57″E
- Construction began: 1977
- Opening date: 1981

Dam and spillways
- Height: 72 m (236 ft)
- Length: 245 m (804 ft)

Reservoir
- Total capacity: 2,718,000 m^{3} (96,000,000 cu ft)
- Catchment area: 251.1 km^{2} (97.0 sq mi)
- Surface area: 11 hectares (27 acres)

Oguchigawa Dam is a gravity dam located in Toyama prefecture in Japan. The dam is used for power production. The catchment area of the dam is 251.1 km^{2}. The dam impounds about 11 ha of land when full and can store 2718 thousand cubic meters of water. The construction of the dam was started on 1977 and completed in 1981.
