= Ninbusuiso Dam =

Dam in Toyama Prefecture, Japan

- Location within Japan
- Location: Toyama Prefecture, Japan
- Coordinates: 36°30′44″N 137°4′21″E
- Construction began: 1960
- Opening date: 1961

Dam and spillways
- Height: 19.9 m (65 ft)
- Length: 42 m (138 ft)

Reservoir
- Total capacity: 13 thousand cubic meters
- Catchment area: 0.8 sq. km
- Surface area: hectares

Ninbusuiso Dam is a gravity dam located in Toyama prefecture in Japan. The dam is used for power production. The catchment area of the dam is 0.8 km^{2}. The dam impounds about ha of land when full and can store 13 thousand cubic meters of water. The construction of the dam was started on 1960 and completed in 1961.
