= Shin Nakachiyama Dam =

Dam in Toyama Prefecture, Japan

- Location within Japan
- Location: Toyama Prefecture, Japan
- Coordinates: 36°32′39″N 137°26′12″E
- Construction began: 1956
- Opening date: 1959

Dam and spillways
- Height: 35 m (115 ft)
- Length: 71.7 m (235 ft)

Reservoir
- Total capacity: 68,000 m^{3} (2,400,000 cu ft)
- Catchment area: 238.6 km^{2} (92.1 sq mi)
- Surface area: 1 hectare (2.5 acres)

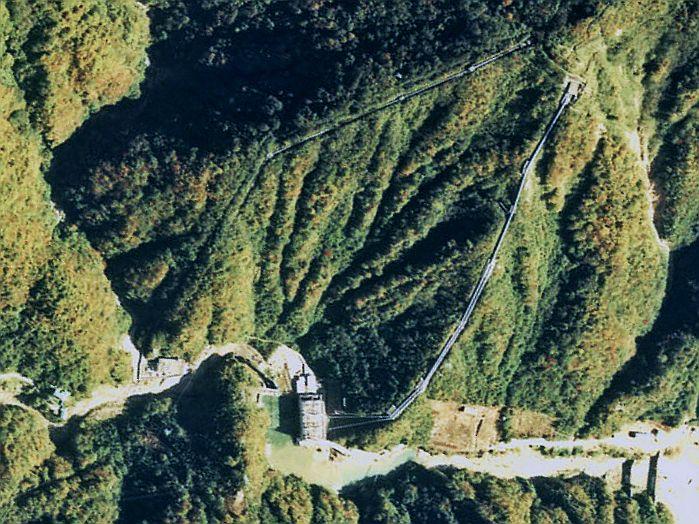
Aerial view of Shin Nakachiyama Dam

Shin Nakachiyama Dam is a gravity dam located in Toyama prefecture in Japan. The dam is used for power production. The catchment area of the dam is 238.6 km^{2}. The dam impounds about 1 ha of land when full and can store 68 thousand cubic meters of water. The construction of the dam was started on 1956 and completed in 1959.
