= Kamiichikawa No.2 Dam =

Dam in Toyama Prefecture, Japan

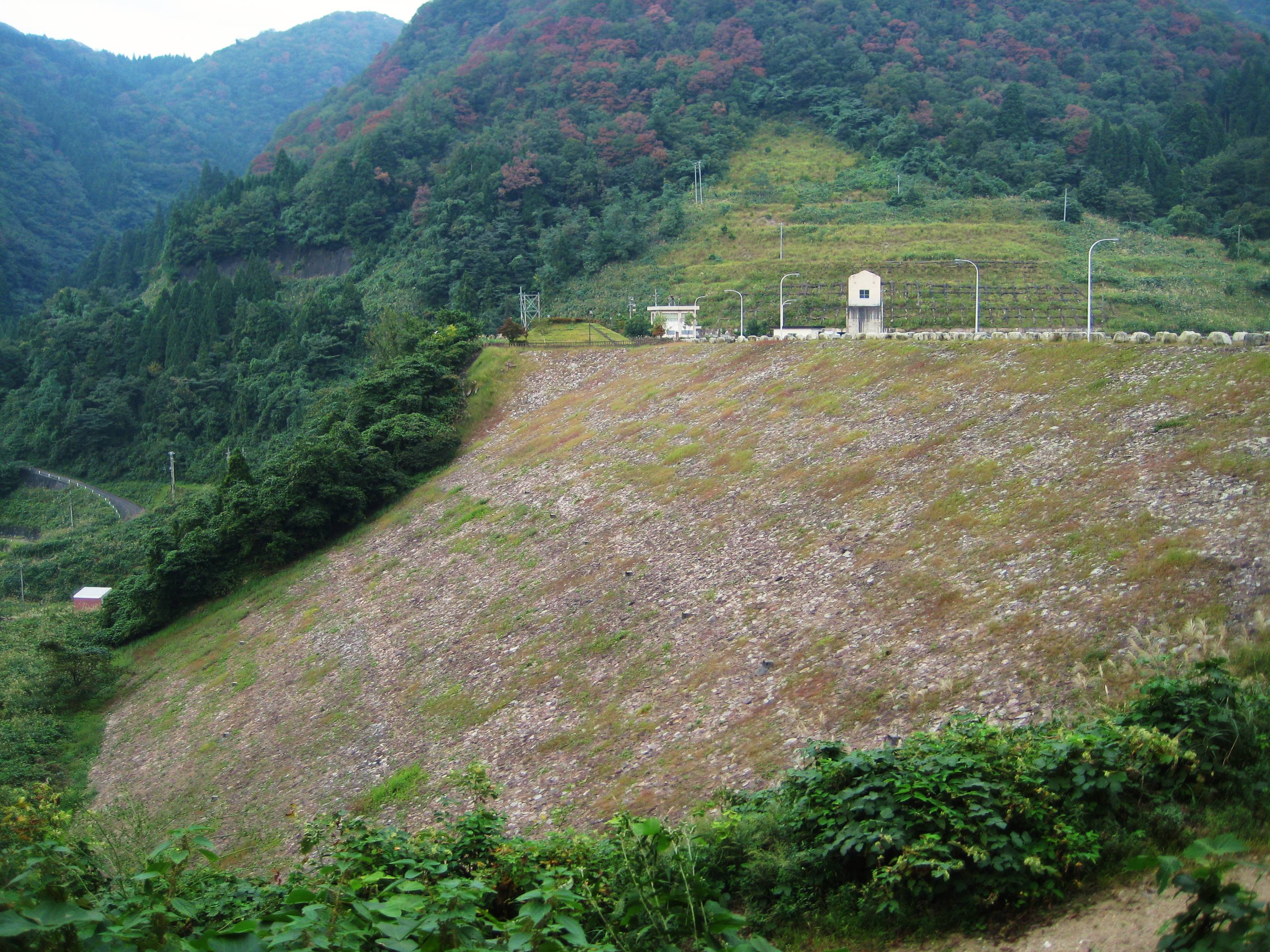

- Location within Japan
- Interactive map of Kamiichikawa No.2 Dam
- Location: Toyama Prefecture, Japan
- Coordinates: 36°40′11″N 137°26′02″E
- Construction began: 1971
- Opening date: 1985

Dam and spillways
- Height: 67 m (220 ft)
- Length: 205 m (673 ft)

Reservoir
- Total capacity: 7800 thousand cubic meters
- Catchment area: 38.7 sq. km
- Surface area: 39 hectares

Kamiichikawa No.2 Dam is a rockfill dam located in Toyama prefecture in Japan. The dam is used for flood control and power production. The catchment area of the dam is 38.7 km^{2}. The dam impounds about 39 ha of land when full and can store 7800 thousand cubic meters of water. The construction of the dam started in 1971 and was completed in 1985.
