= Kadogawa Dam =

Dam in Toyama Prefecture, Japan

Kadokawa Dam
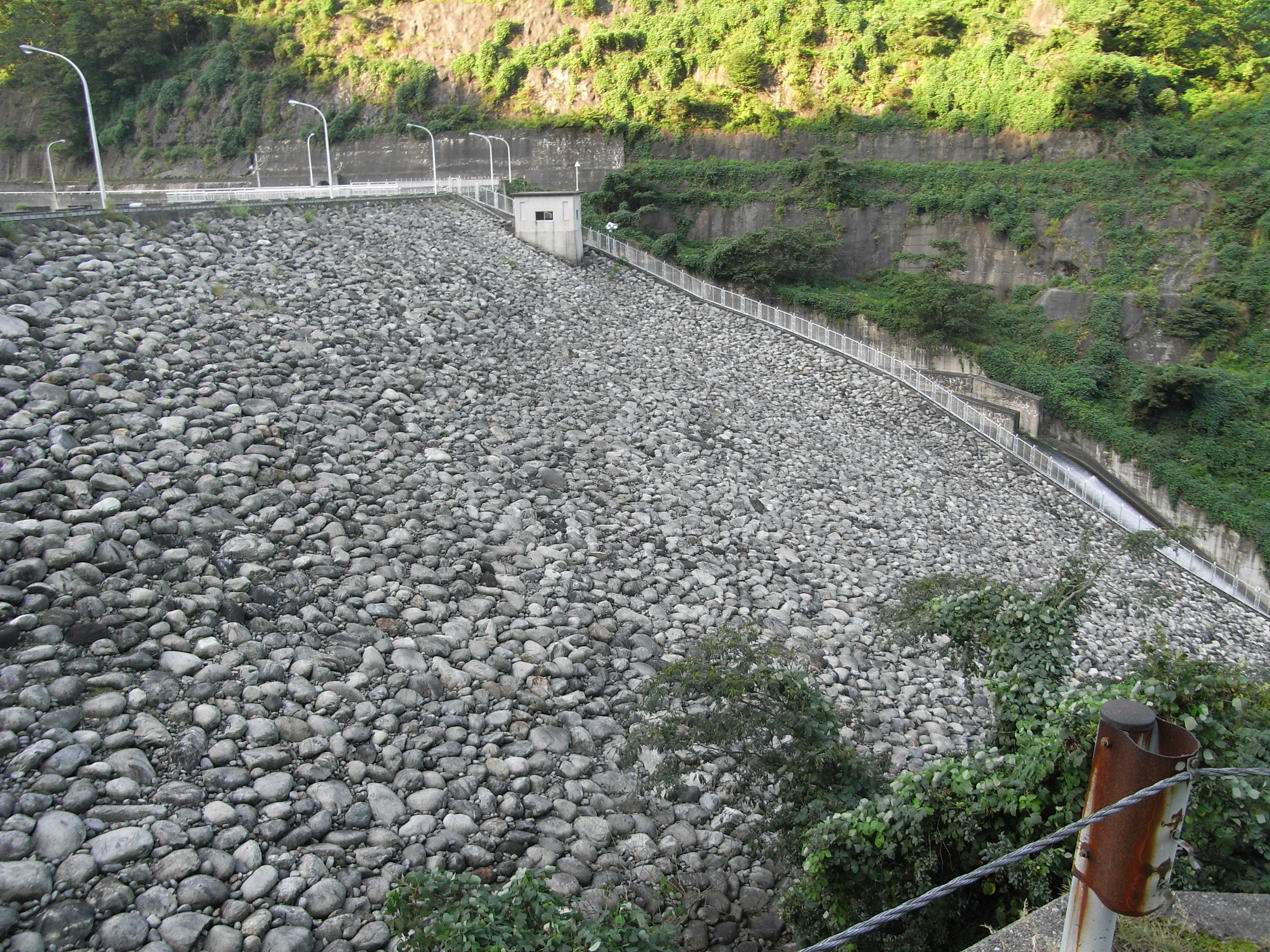

- Location within Japan
- Interactive map of Kadokawa Dam
- Location: Toyama Prefecture, Japan
- Coordinates: 36°45′13″N 137°25′51″E
- Construction began: 1969
- Opening date: 1978

Dam and spillways
- Height: 58.5 m (192 ft)
- Length: 180 m (590 ft)

Reservoir
- Total capacity: 1550 thousand cubic meters
- Catchment area: 16.2 sq. km
- Surface area: 12 hectares

'Kadokawa Dam or Kadogawa Dam is a rockfill dam located in Toyama prefecture in Japan. The dam is used for flood control. The catchment area of the dam is 16.2 km^{2}. The dam impounds about 12 ha of land when full and can store 1550 thousand cubic meters of water. The construction of the dam was started on 1969 and completed in 1978.
