= Yutanigawa Dam =

Dam in Toyama Prefecture, Japan

- Location within Japan
- Location: Toyama Prefecture, Japan
- Coordinates: 36°34′48″N 137°3′44″E
- Construction began: 1977
- Opening date: 2000

Dam and spillways
- Height: 63.7 m (209 ft)
- Length: 176.4 m (579 ft)

Reservoir
- Total capacity: 1,636,000 m^{3} (57,800,000 cu ft)
- Catchment area: 4.2 km^{2} (1.6 sq mi)
- Surface area: 11 hectares (27 acres)

Yutanigawa Dam is a rockfill dam located in Toyama prefecture in Japan. The dam is used for irrigation. The catchment area of the dam is 4.2 km^{2}. The dam impounds about 11 ha of land when full and can store 1636 thousand cubic meters of water. The construction of the dam was started on 1977 and completed in 2000.
