= Konadegawa Dam =

Dam in Toyama Prefecture, Japan

- Location within Japan
- Location: Toyama Prefecture, Japan
- Coordinates: 36°43′32″N 136°51′11″E
- Construction began: 1969
- Opening date: 1978

Dam and spillways
- Height: 45 m (148 ft)
- Length: 224 m (735 ft)

Reservoir
- Total capacity: 6600 thousand cubic meters
- Catchment area: 31.8 sq. km
- Surface area: 70 hectares

Konadegawa Dam is a rockfill dam located in Toyama prefecture in Japan. The dam is used for flood control and water supply. The catchment area of the dam is 31.8 km^{2}. The dam impounds about 70 ha of land when full and can store 6600 thousand cubic meters of water. The construction of the dam was started on 1969 and completed in 1978.
