= Suganuma Dam =

Dam in Toyama Prefecture, Japan

- Location within Japan
- Location: Toyama Prefecture, Japan
- Coordinates: 36°29′12″N 137°3′01″E
- Construction began: 1956
- Opening date: 1958

Dam and spillways
- Height: 22 m (72 ft)
- Length: 50 m (160 ft)

Reservoir
- Total capacity: 524,000 m^{3} (18,500,000 cu ft)
- Catchment area: 43.1 km^{2} (16.6 sq mi)
- Surface area: 8 hectares (20 acres)

Suganuma Dam is a gravity dam located in Toyama prefecture in Japan. The dam is used for power production. The catchment area of the dam is 43.1 km^{2}. The dam impounds about 8 ha of land when full and can store 524 thousand cubic meters of water. The construction of the dam was started on 1956 and completed in 1958.
