= Kamiichigawa Dam =

Dam in Toyama Prefecture, Japan

Kamiichikawa Dam
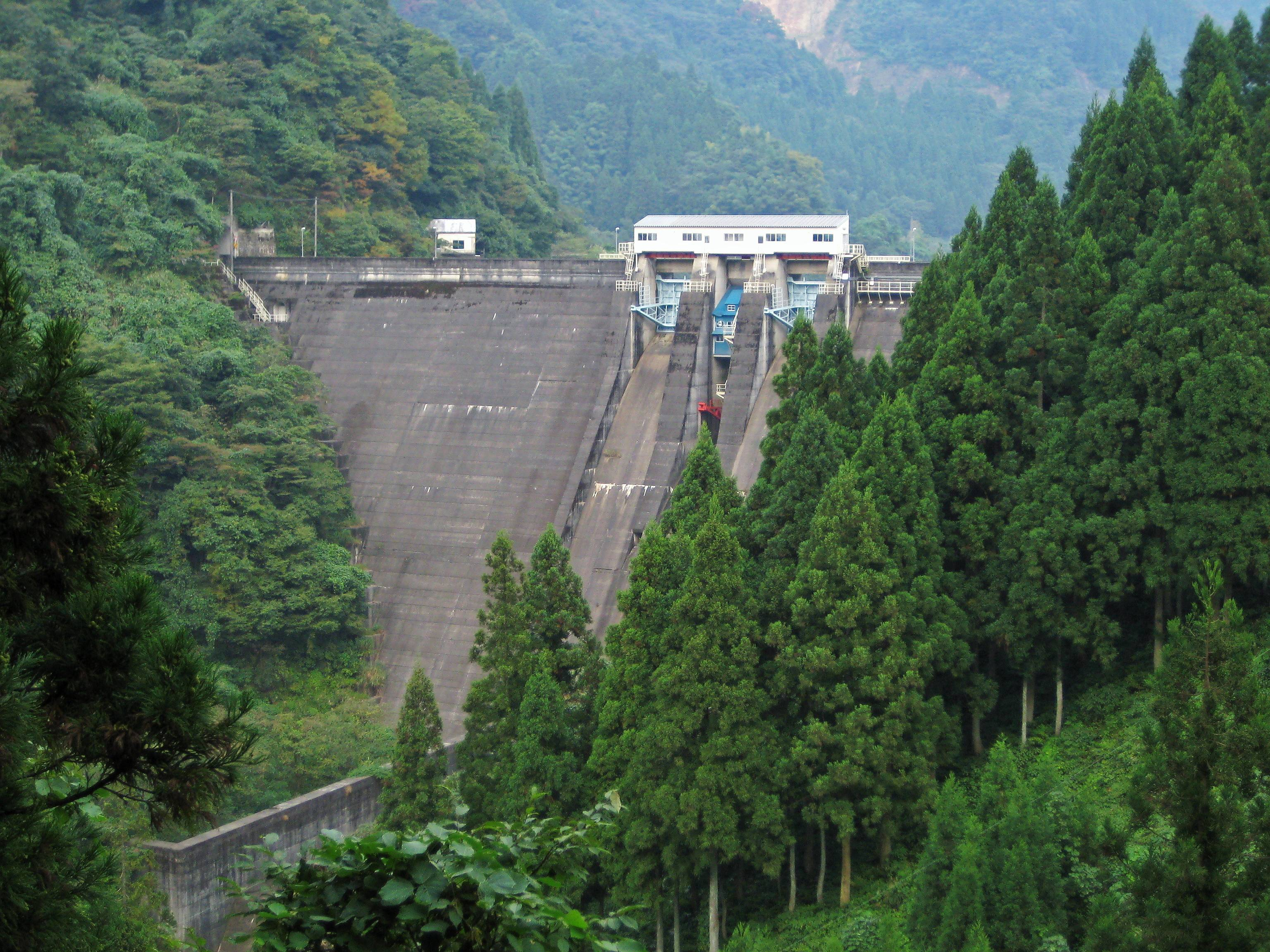

- Location within Japan
- Interactive map of Kamiichikawa Dam
- Location: Toyama Prefecture, Japan
- Coordinates: 36°40′46″N 137°24′59″E
- Construction began: 1959
- Opening date: 1964

Dam and spillways
- Height: 64 m (210 ft)
- Length: 146 m (479 ft)

Reservoir
- Total capacity: 4850 thousand cubic meters
- Catchment area: 44.7 sq. km
- Surface area: 21 hectares

Kamiichikawa Dam is a gravity dam located in Toyama prefecture in Japan. The dam is used for flood control and power production. The catchment area of the dam is 44.7 km^{2}. The dam impounds about 21 ha of land when full and can store 4850 thousand cubic meters of water. The construction of the dam was started on 1959 and completed in 1964.
