= Sakuraga-ike Dam =

Sakuraga-ike Dam may refer to:

- Sakuraga-ike Dam (Kōchi)
- Sakuraga-ike Dam (Toyama)
