= Koregatani Dam =

Dam in Toyama Prefecture, Japan

- Location within Japan
- Location: Toyama Prefecture, Japan
- Coordinates: 36°30′04″N 136°51′45″E
- Opening date: 1968

Dam and spillways
- Height: 15.5 m (51 ft)
- Length: 192.7 m (632 ft)

Reservoir
- Total capacity: 260 thousand cubic meters
- Catchment area: 0.7 sq. km
- Surface area: hectares

Koregatani Dam is an earthfill dam located in Toyama prefecture in Japan. The dam is used for irrigation. The catchment area of the dam is 0.7 km^{2}. The dam impounds about ha of land when full and can store 260 thousand cubic meters of water. The construction of the dam was completed in 1968.
