= Horinji Dam =

Dam in Toyama Prefecture, Japan

- Location within Japan
- Interactive map of Horinji Dam
- Location: Toyama Prefecture, Japan
- Coordinates: 36°33′55″N 136°50′36″E
- Construction began: 1953
- Opening date: 1955

Dam and spillways
- Height: 15.8 m (52 ft)
- Length: 86 m (282 ft)

Reservoir
- Total capacity: 50 thousand cubic meters
- Catchment area: 1.3 sq. km
- Surface area: 1 hectares

Horinji Dam is an earthfill dam located in Toyama prefecture in Japan. The dam is used for irrigation. The catchment area of the dam is 1.3 km^{2}. The dam impounds about 1 ha of land when full and can store 50 thousand cubic meters of water. The construction of the dam was started on 1953 and completed in 1955.
