= Terao Dam =

Dam in Toyama Prefecture, Japan

- Location within Japan
- Location: Toyama Prefecture, Japan
- Coordinates: 36°53′55″N 136°53′55″E
- Construction began: 1967
- Opening date: 1973

Dam and spillways
- Height: 29.2 m (96 ft)
- Length: 192.3 m (631 ft)

Reservoir
- Total capacity: 543,000 m^{3} (19,200,000 cu ft)
- Catchment area: 6 km^{2} (2.3 sq mi)
- Surface area: 5 hectares (12 acres)

Terao Dam is an earthfill dam located in Toyama prefecture in Japan. The dam is used for flood control. The catchment area of the dam is 6 km^{2}. The dam impounds about 5 ha of land when full and can store 543 thousand cubic meters of water. The construction of the dam was started on 1967 and completed in 1973.
