= Harayama Dam =

Dam in Toyama Prefecture, Japan

- Location within Japan
- Interactive map of Harayama Dam
- Location: Toyama Prefecture, Japan
- Coordinates: 36°31′38″N 137°8′02″E
- Opening date: 1939

Dam and spillways
- Height: 18.5 m (61 ft)
- Length: 45 m (148 ft)

Reservoir
- Total capacity: 35 thousand cubic meters
- Catchment area: 0.5 sq. km
- Surface area: 1 hectares

Harayama Dam is an earthfill dam located in Toyama prefecture in Japan. The dam is used for irrigation. The catchment area of the dam is 0.5 km^{2}. The dam impounds about 1 ha of land when full and can store 35 thousand cubic meters of water. The construction of the dam was completed in 1939.
