= Chubetsu Dam =

Coordinates: 43°37′38″N 142°37′46″E

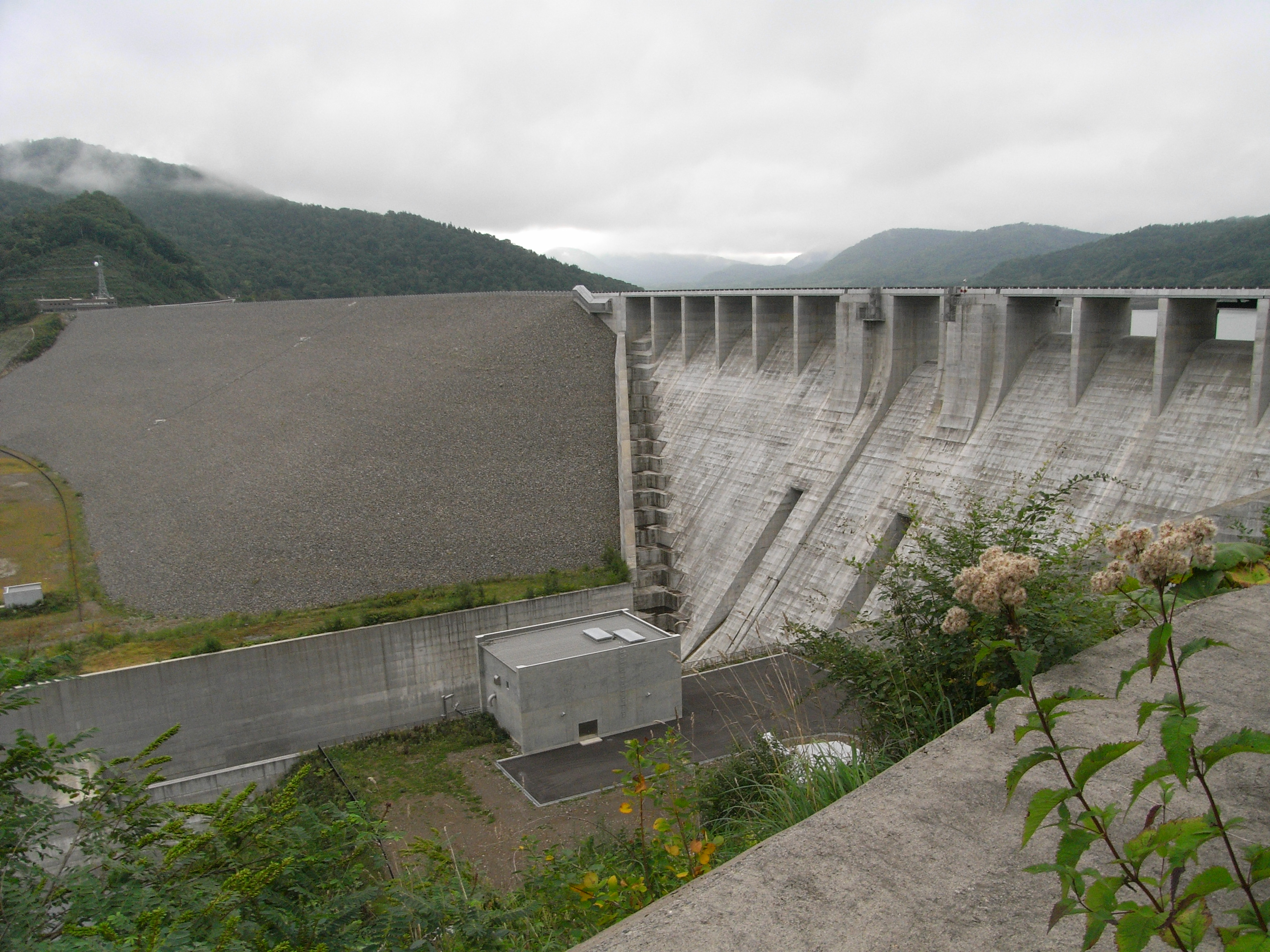
- Interactive map of Chubetsu Dam
- Location: Biei, Hokkaidō, Japan
- Construction began: 1977
- Opening date: 2006

Dam and spillways
- Impounds: Chubetsu River
- Height: 86 m
- Length: 885 m

Reservoir
- Total capacity: 93,000,000 m^{3}
- Catchment area: 238.9 km^{2}
- Surface area: 372 hectares

The Chubetsu Dam (忠別ダム, Chūbetsu damu) is a dam in Biei, Hokkaidō, Japan. The dam was completed in 2006. The dam is located at the border of Biei, Hokkaido and Kamikawa, Hokkaido. It is a multipurpose concrete Gravity dam and Rockfill dam. It stands at 86m tall and has a length of 885m.

== Overview ==
Following World War II, modernization of Agriculture in Japan advanced rapidly and a steady source of water was required for the new farming techniques. Hokkaido's population quickly grew and a stable water supply was needed. For this reason, a survey of agricultural dams along the Chubetsu River was conducted In 1977, the Chubetsu flood control, irrigation, water supply and Hydropower dam was planned. After prolonged, the project was started in 1986 was finally completed in 2007 after some 29 years had passed.
