= Unazuki Dam =

Dam in Toyama Prefecture, Japan

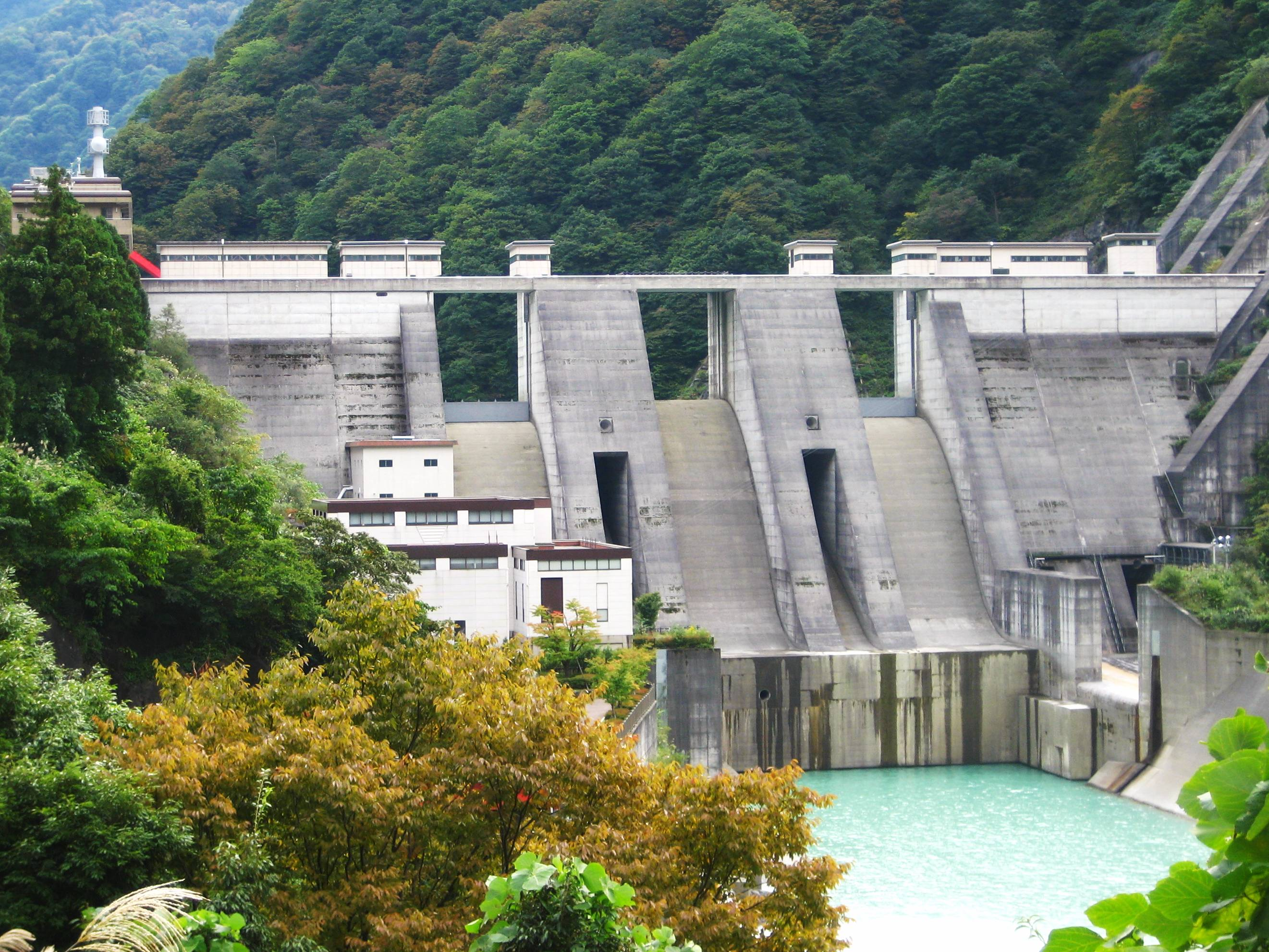

- Location within Japan
- Location: Toyama Prefecture, Japan
- Coordinates: 36°48′34″N 137°35′25″E
- Construction began: 1974
- Opening date: 2000

Dam and spillways
- Height: 97 m (318 ft)
- Length: 190 m (620 ft)

Reservoir
- Total capacity: 24,700,000 m^{3} (870,000,000 cu ft)
- Catchment area: 617.5 km^{2} (238.4 sq mi)
- Surface area: 88 hectares (220 acres)

Unazuki Dam is a gravity dam located in Toyama prefecture in Japan. The dam is used for flood control, water supply and power production. The catchment area of the dam is 617.5 km^{2} (238.4 sq mi). The dam impounds about 88 ha (220 acres) of land when full and can store 24700 thousand cubic meters of water. The construction of the dam started in 1974 and completed in 2000.
