= Magawa Choseichi Dam =

Dam in Toyama Prefecture, Japan

Magawa Choseichi
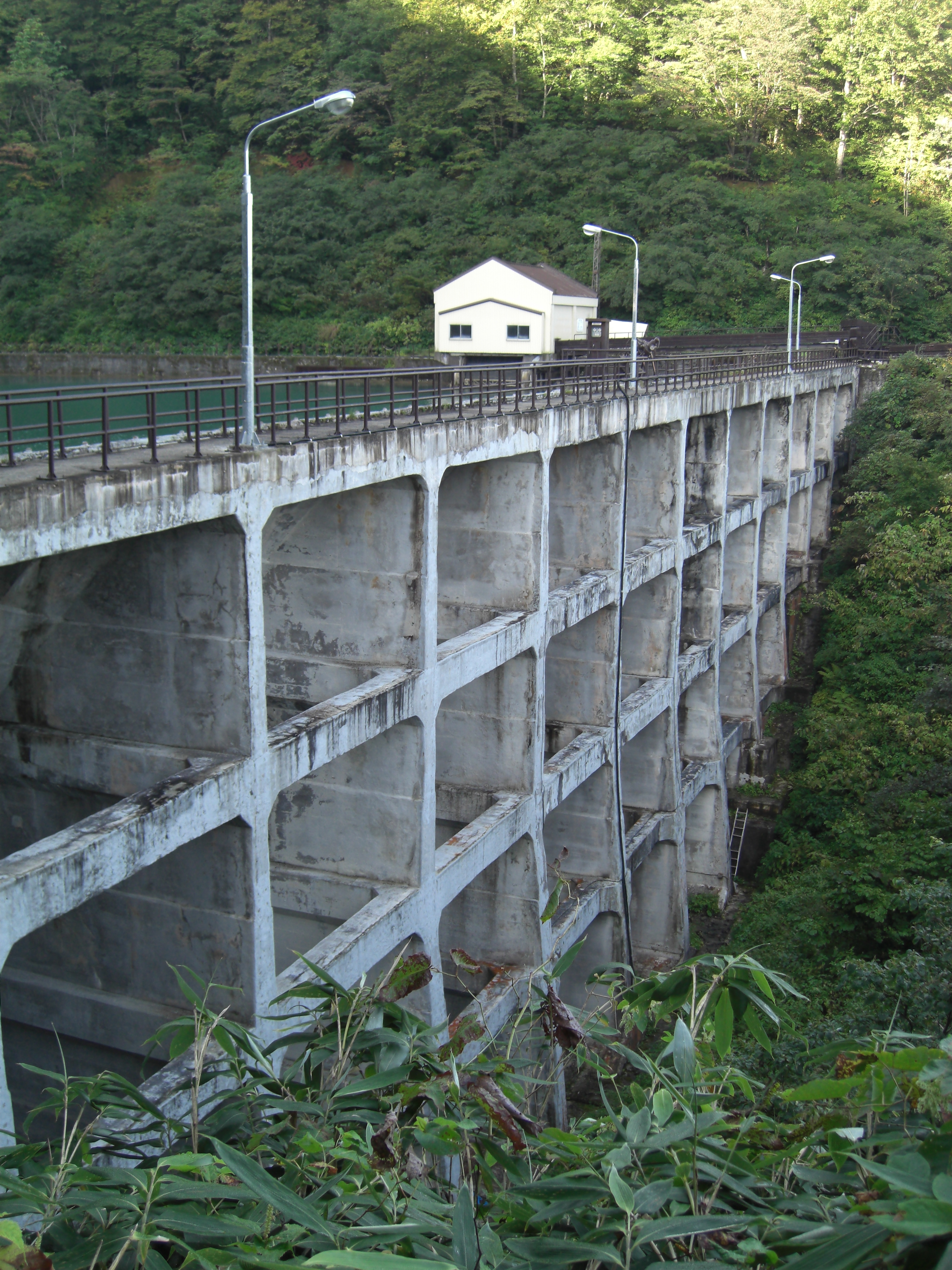

- Location within Japan
- Location: Toyama Prefecture, Japan
- Coordinates: 36°33′58″N 137°27′16″E
- Construction began: 1927
- Opening date: 1929

Dam and spillways
- Height: 19.1 m (63 ft)
- Length: 105 m (344 ft)

Reservoir
- Total capacity: 48 thousand cubic meters
- Catchment area: 105 sq. km
- Surface area: 1 hectares

Magawa Choseichi is a buttress dam located in Toyama prefecture in Japan. The dam is used for power production. The catchment area of the dam is 105 km^{2}. The dam impounds about 1 ha of land when full and can store 48 thousand cubic meters of water. The construction of the dam was started on 1927 and completed in 1929.
