= Furudo Dam =

Dam in Toyama Prefecture, Japan

- Location within Japan
- Interactive map of Furudo Dam
- Location: Toyama Prefecture, Japan
- Coordinates: 36°39′36″N 137°6′19″E
- Construction began: 1968
- Opening date: 1982

Dam and spillways
- Height: 32 m (105 ft)
- Length: 154 m (505 ft)

Reservoir
- Total capacity: 3495 thousand cubic meters
- Catchment area: 2.8 sq. km
- Surface area: 32 hectares

Furudo Dam is an earthfill dam located in Toyama prefecture in Japan. The dam is used for irrigation. The catchment area of the dam is 2.8 km^{2}. The dam impounds about 32 ha of land when full and can store 3495 thousand cubic meters of water. The construction of the dam was started on 1968 and completed in 1982.
