= Kuwanoin-ike Dam =

Dam in Toyama Prefecture, Japan

Kuwanoin-ike
- Location within Japan
- Location: Toyama Prefecture, Japan
- Coordinates: 36°48′47″N 136°53′30″E
- Opening date: 1953

Dam and spillways
- Height: 23 m (75 ft)
- Length: 86 m (282 ft)

Reservoir
- Total capacity: 794 thousand cubic meters
- Catchment area: 2.9 sq. km
- Surface area: 11 hectares

Kuwanoin-ike is an earthfill dam located in Toyama prefecture in Japan. The dam is used for irrigation. The catchment area of the dam is 2.9 km^{2}. The dam impounds about 11 ha of land when full and can store 794 thousand cubic meters of water. The construction of the dam was completed in 1953.
