= Katsurazawa Dam =

Dam in Hokkaidō Prefecture, Japan

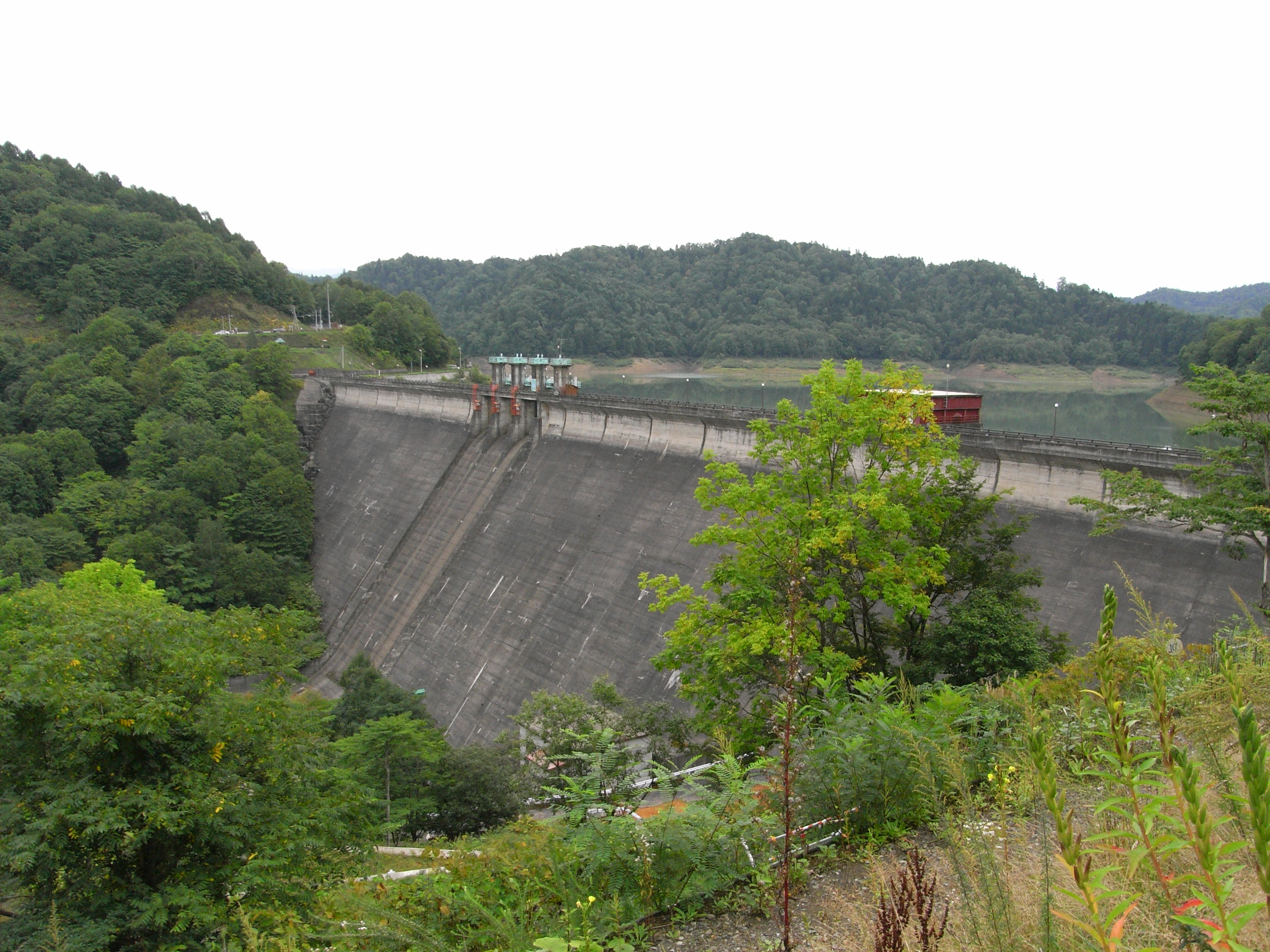
- Interactive map of Katsurazawa Dam
- Location: Hokkaidō, Japan.
- Coordinates: 43°14′23″N 142°00′09″E
- Construction began: 1947
- Opening date: 1957

Dam and spillways
- Impounds: Kushunbetsu River
- Height: 63.6 m
- Length: 334.3 m

Reservoir
- Total capacity: 92,700,000 m^{3}
- Catchment area: 446.2 km^{2}
- Surface area: 499 hectares

The Katsurazawa Dam is a dam in Hokkaidō, Japan. It was Hokkaido's first multipurpose dam and the post-war Ishikari River watershed development plan's starting point. The dam is a 63.6m in height Concrete Gravity dam, immediately downstream from the Shinkatsurazawa Dam. The artificial lake resulting from the construction of the Katsurazawa Dam is known as the Katsurazawa Lake.

== Overview ==
The construction of the dam would lead to the relocation of 172 households. The dam's goals were to supply water for irrigation to Bibai Fields, Bibai City, Mikasa City, and also to produce up to 15,000 kW of Hydro Electric Power.

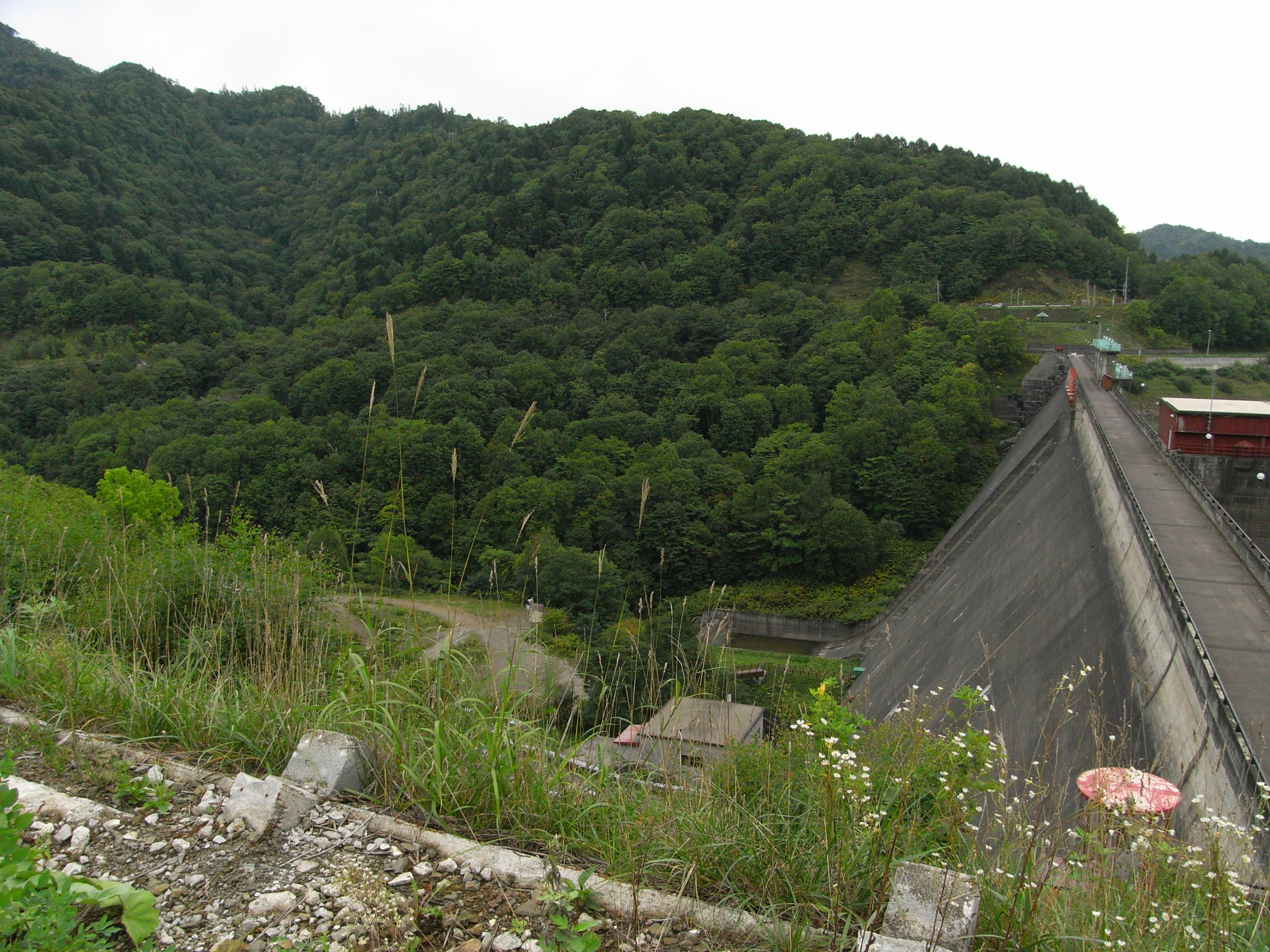
Shin-Katsurazawa Dam (Modified Katsurazawa Dam)

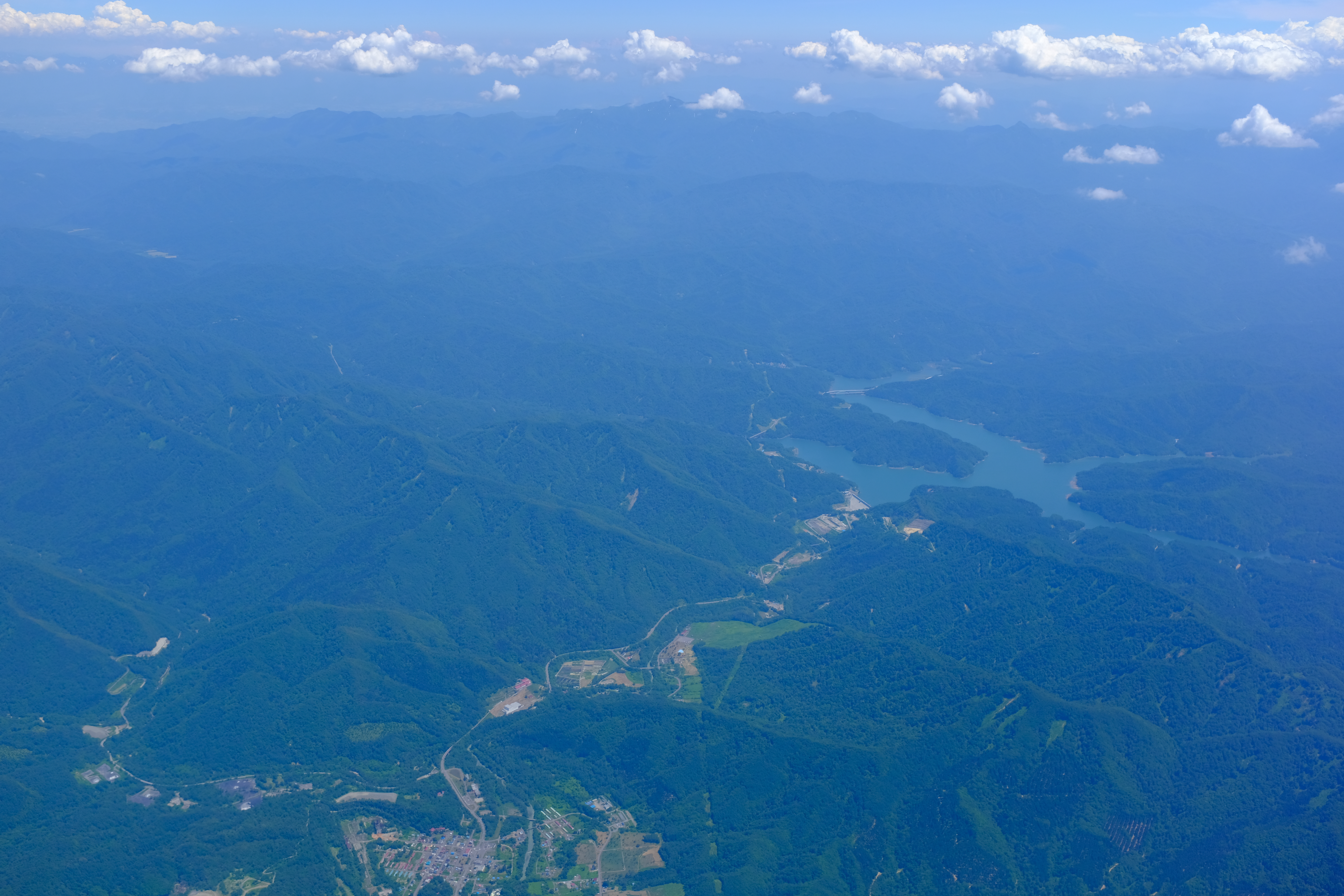
View from an airplane
