= Sukenobu Dam =

Dam in Toyama Prefecture, Japan

Sukenobe Dam
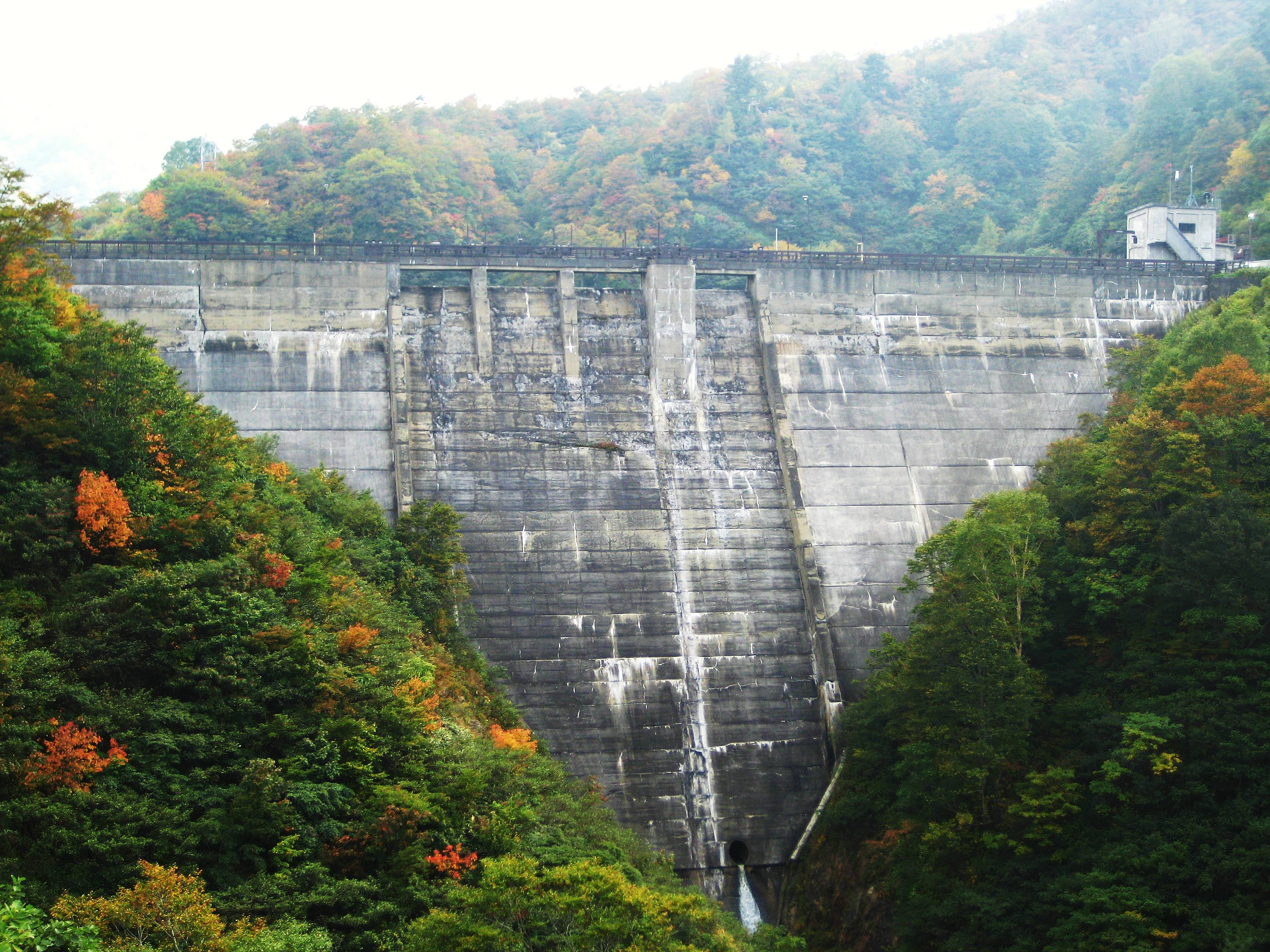

- Location within Japan
- Location: Toyama Prefecture, Japan
- Coordinates: 36°29′21″N 137°23′57″E
- Construction began: 1928
- Opening date: 1931

Dam and spillways
- Height: 45.5 m (149 ft)
- Length: 125.5 m (412 ft)

Reservoir
- Total capacity: 8,790,000 m^{3} (310,000,000 cu ft)
- Catchment area: 6.8 km^{2} (2.6 sq mi)
- Surface area: 60 hectares (150 acres)

Sukenobe Dam is a gravity dam located in Toyama prefecture in Japan. The dam is used for power production. The catchment area of the dam is 6.8 km^{2}. The dam impounds about 60 ha of land when full and can store 8790 thousand cubic meters of water. The construction of the dam was started on 1928 and completed in 1931.
