= Hanyu-ohike Dam =

Dam in Toyama Prefecture, Japan

Hanyu-ohike
- Location within Japan
- Interactive map of Hanyu-ohike
- Location: Toyama Prefecture, Japan
- Coordinates: 36°39′54″N 136°49′38″E
- Construction began: 1989
- Opening date: 1993

Dam and spillways
- Height: 15 m (49 ft)
- Length: 126 m (413 ft)

Reservoir
- Total capacity: 225 thousand cubic meters
- Catchment area: 0.5 sq. km
- Surface area: hectares

Hanyu-ohike is an earthfill dam located in Toyama prefecture in Japan. The dam is used for irrigation. The catchment area of the dam is 0.5 km^{2}. The dam impounds about ha of land when full and can store 225 thousand cubic meters of water. The construction of the dam was started on 1989 and completed in 1993.
