= Yatsuo Dam =

Dam in Toyama Prefecture, Japan

- Location within Japan
- Location: Toyama Prefecture, Japan
- Coordinates: 36°33′43″N 137°5′53″E
- Construction began: 1961
- Opening date: 1963

Dam and spillways
- Height: 21 m (69 ft)
- Length: 82 m (269 ft)

Reservoir
- Total capacity: 300,000 m^{3} (11,000,000 cu ft)
- Catchment area: 135.5 km^{2} (52.3 sq mi)
- Surface area: 5 hectares (12 acres)

Yatsuo Dam is a gravity dam located in Toyama prefecture in Japan. The dam is used for power production. The catchment area of the dam is 135.5 km^{2}. The dam impounds about 5 ha of land when full and can store 300 thousand cubic meters of water. The construction of the dam was started in 1961 and completed in 1963.
