= Jin-ni Dam =

Dam in Toyama Prefecture, Japan

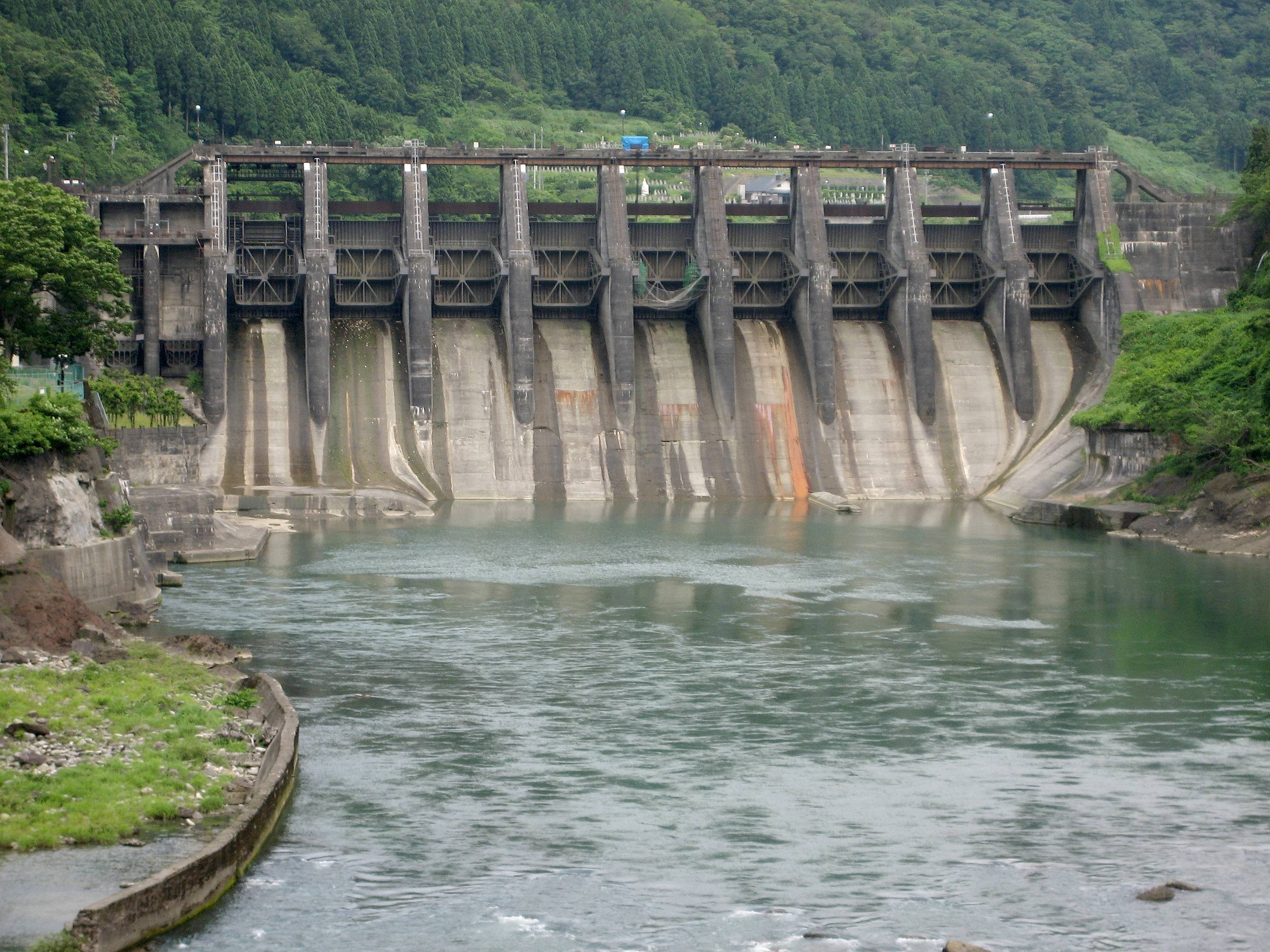

- Location within Japan
- Interactive map of Jin-ni Dam
- Location: Toyama Prefecture, Japan
- Coordinates: 36°33′11″N 137°13′24″E
- Construction began: 1952
- Opening date: 1953

Dam and spillways
- Height: 40 m (130 ft)
- Length: 336.8 m (1,105 ft)

Reservoir
- Total capacity: 8663 thousand cubic meters
- Catchment area: 2060 sq. km
- Surface area: 67 hectares

Jin-ni (Jin No. 2) Dam is a gravity dam located in Toyama prefecture in Japan. The dam is used for power production. The catchment area of the dam is 2060 km^{2}. The dam impounds about 67 ha of land when full and can store 8663 thousand cubic meters of water. The construction of the dam was started on 1952 and completed in 1953.
