= Ohgayarindo Tameike Dam =

Dam in Toyama Prefecture, Japan

Ohgayarindo Tameike
- Location within Japan
- Location: Toyama Prefecture, Japan
- Coordinates: 36°29′10″N 136°54′19″E
- Construction began: 1928; 98 years ago
- Opening date: 1931; 95 years ago

Dam and spillways
- Height: 19 m (62 ft)
- Length: 99 m (325 ft)

Reservoir
- Total capacity: 164,000 cubic meters (5,800,000 cu ft)
- Catchment area: 3.6 km^{2} (1.4 sq mi)
- Surface area: 2 hectares (4.9 acres)

Ohgayarindo Tameike is an earthfill dam located in Toyama prefecture in Japan. The dam is used for irrigation. The catchment area of the dam is 3.6 km^{2} (1.4 sq mi). The dam impounds about 2 ha (4.9 acres) of land when full and can store 164,000 cubic meters (5,800,000 cu ft) of water. The construction of the dam was started on 1928 and completed in 1931.
