= Kitamata Dam =

Dam in Toyama Prefecture, Japan

KitamataDam
- Location within Japan
- Location: Toyama Prefecture, Japan
- Coordinates: 36°50′32″N 137°40′04″E
- Construction began: 1980
- Opening date: 1986

Dam and spillways
- Height: 35 m (115 ft)
- Length: 107 m (351 ft)

Reservoir
- Total capacity: 690 thousand cubic meters
- Catchment area: 40 sq. km
- Surface area: 67 hectares

KitamataDam is a gravity dam located in Toyama prefecture in Japan. The dam is used for power production. The catchment area of the dam is 40 km^{2}. The dam impounds about 67 ha of land when full and can store 690 thousand cubic meters of water. The construction of the dam was started on 1980 and completed in 1986.
