= Akasofu Tameike Dam =

Dam in Toyama Prefecture, Japan

Akasofu Tameike
- Location within Japan
- Location: Toyama Prefecture, Japan
- Coordinates: 36°31′33″N 136°56′21″E
- Construction began: 1932
- Opening date: 1945

Dam and spillways
- Height: 31.9 m (105 ft)
- Length: 200.2 m (657 ft)

Reservoir
- Total capacity: 760 thousand cubic meters
- Catchment area: 4.77 sq. km
- Surface area: 7 hectares

Akasofu Tameike is an earthfill dam located in Toyama prefecture in Japan. The dam is used for irrigation. The catchment area of the dam is 4.77 km^{2}. The dam impounds about 7 ha of land when full and can store 760 thousand cubic meters of water. The construction of the dam was started on 1932 and completed in 1945.
