= Ohara Dam =

Ohara Dam may refer to:

- Ohara Dam (Fukui)
- Ohara Dam (Toyama)
- Ohara Dam (Shiga)
