= Nakayama Dam =

Dam in Toyama Prefecture, Japan

- Location within Japan
- Location: Toyama Prefecture, Japan
- Coordinates: 36°29′20″N 137°3′51″E
- Construction began: 1960
- Opening date: 1961

Dam and spillways
- Height: 24 m (79 ft)
- Length: 70.5 m (231 ft)

Reservoir
- Total capacity: 111 thousand cubic meters
- Catchment area: 108.3 sq. km
- Surface area: 2 hectares

Nakayama Dam is a gravity dam located in Toyama prefecture in Japan. The dam is used for power production. The catchment area of the dam is 108.3 km^{2}. The dam impounds about 2 ha of land when full and can store 111 thousand cubic meters of water. The construction of the dam was started on 1960 and completed in 1961.
