= Murakamike Residence =

Historic house in Japan

- 村上家住宅
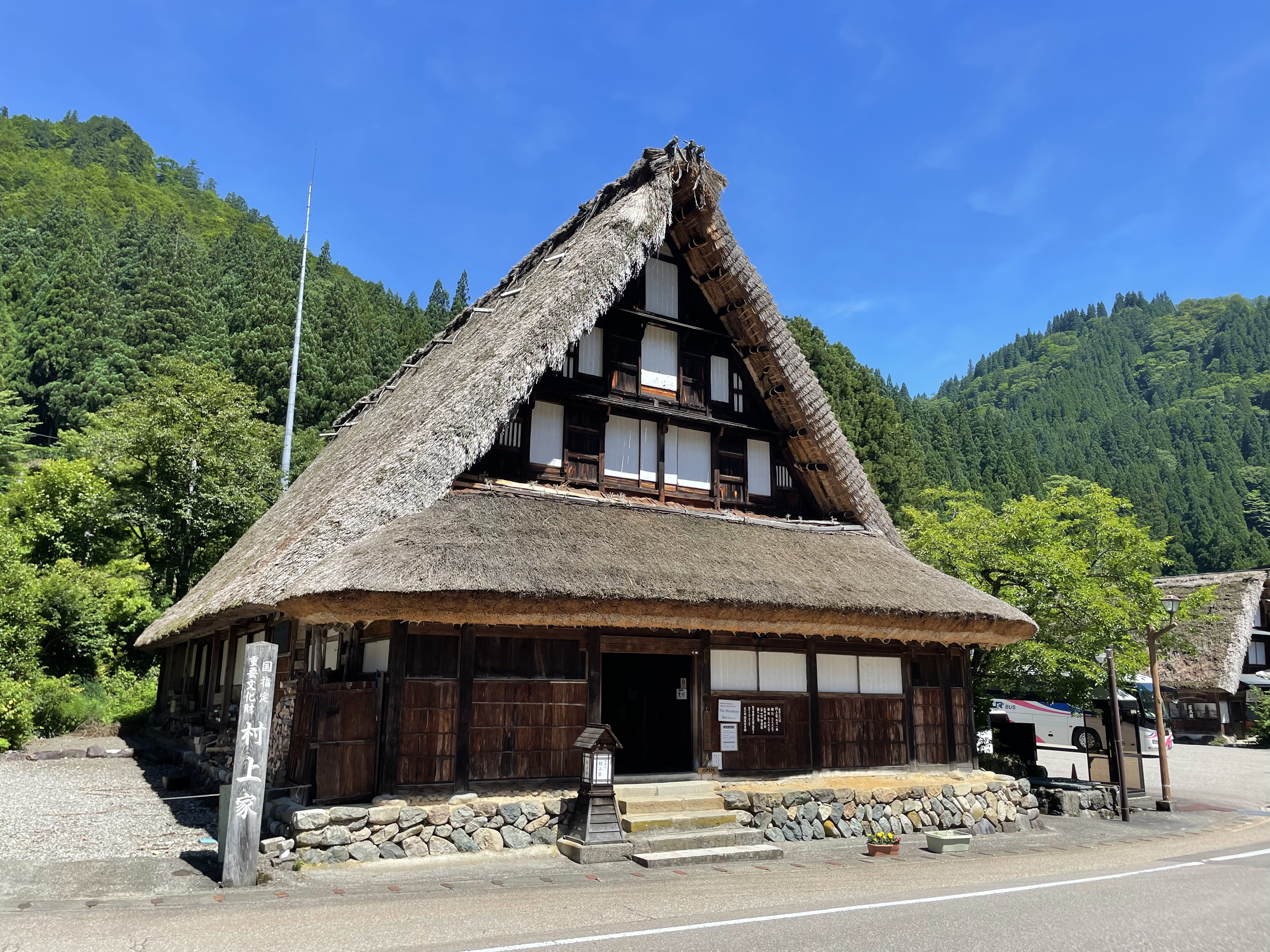
- Murakamike Residence

- Location within Toyama Prefecture Location within Japan

General information
- Location: Gokayama, Japan, Japan
- Coordinates: 36°24′38.04″N 136°55′51.62″E

The Murakamike Residence (村上家住宅) is one of the gasshō-zukuri houses in Kaminashi Village, Nanto City, Toyama Prefecture. It is designated as an Important Cultural Property of Japan.

== Overview ==
Kaminashi village, where the Murakamike Residence is located, was one of the most historic villages in Gokayama, with the oldest wooden house in the prefecture, the Kaminashi Hakusan Shrine.

The Murakamike Residence is thought to have been built around the middle of the Edo period, but local legend has it that it was constructed around the time of the Ishiyama Hongan-ji War, which broke out in 1570 during the Sengoku period. During the time of the Ishiyama Hongan-ji War, a man who was strong enough to lift timbers by himself was helping the Murakami family to build a house, but he became discouraged when he heard the news of the fall of Ishiyama Hongan-ji and could no longer lift the timbers. The Murakamike Residence retains the remains of an old and archaic style, such as showing the transitional style from the Buke-zukuri to the Shoin-zukuri during the Sengoku period.

It is thought that gassho-zukuri minka were established around the 17th century, but in the 18th century, carpenters from Okubo Village in Himi began to work on Gokayama minka, and the gassho-zukuri minka further developed and became larger in scale. Local historian Saeki Yasukazu estimates that the Murakamike Residence was built in the first half of the 18th century, when Okubo carpenters began to expand their business, based on the simple layout of the house with large wood divisions. Saeki also estimates that the "Gassho Guesthouse Kazura," formerly the residence of the Sakai family in Inotani Village and now moved to Sakuraga-ike, was built in the same period.

The Murakamike Residence was originally owned by the Yamazaki family, but after the Yamazaki family moved to Hokkaido at the end of the Edo period, the Murakami family is said to have come to own it. The Murakami family's trade name is "Omote," which means "main house" or "main family," and the Murakami family was positioned as the center of the Kaminashi community.

The Murakamike Residence, along with the Iwaseke residence and others, was designated as an Important Cultural Property on May 14, 1958. A construction report was prepared in 2022.

== Travel Information ==
- Car: About 10 minutes from Gokayama IC
- Bus: Right away on foot from World Heritage Bus "Kaminashi" Bus stop

== See also ==
- Historic Villages of Shirakawa-gō and Gokayama
- The Iwaseke Residence
- The Habake Residence

== Literature ==
- Taira village History Compilation Committee, ed. (1985). History of Taira village (in Japanese). Taira village.
- Saeki, Yasuichi (February 2009). A Study of the History of the Formation of the gasshō-zukuri Minka (in Japanese). Katsura Shobō. ISBN 978-4-9033-5159-9.
- Toyama international College of Crafts & Arts, ed. (2022). Report on Seismic Reinforcement and Conservation Repair of the Murakamike Residence an Important Cultural Property (in Japanese). Toyama international College of Crafts & Arts.
