= Habake Residence =

Traditional house in Nanto, Japan

- 羽馬家住宅
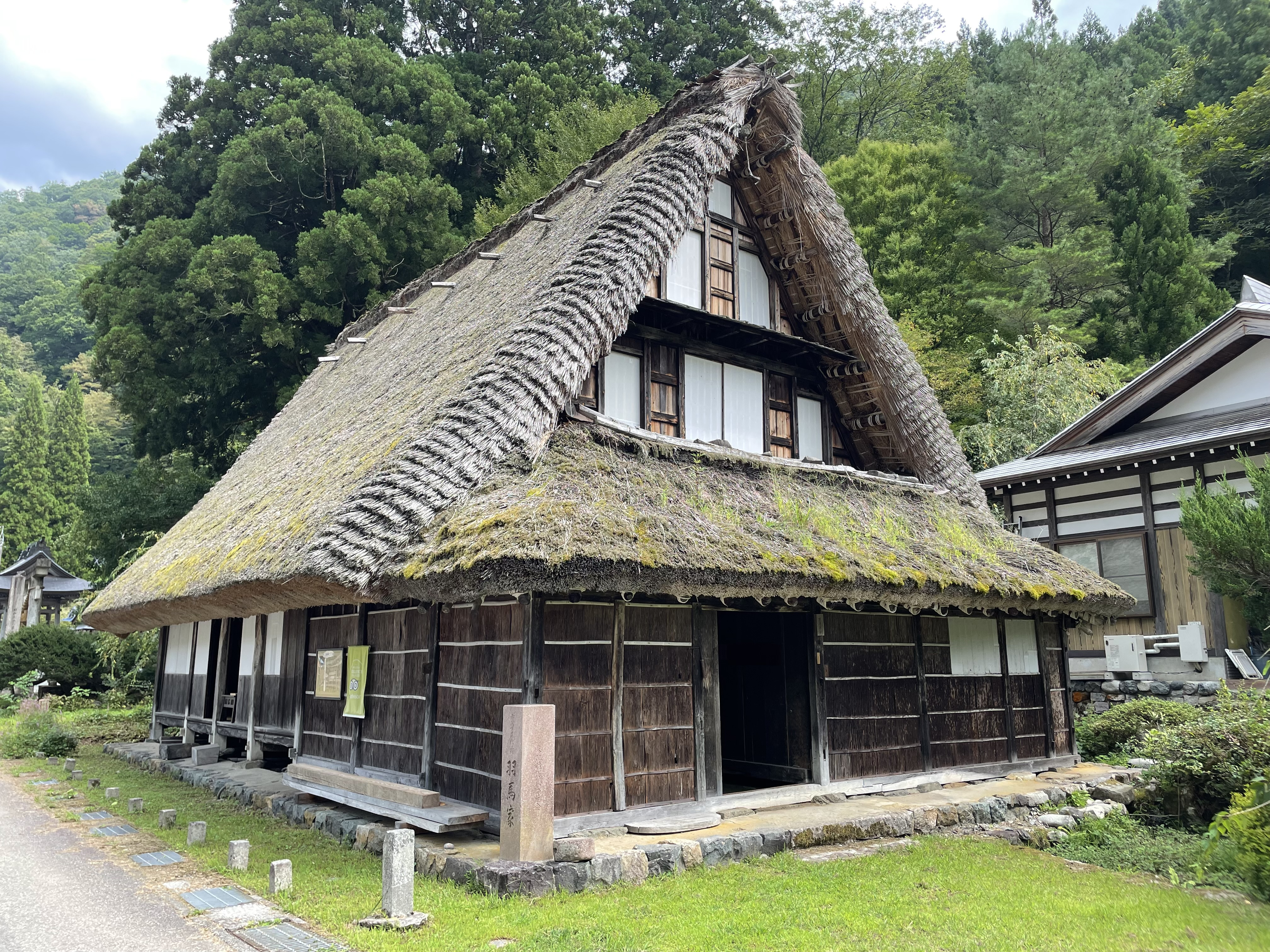
- Habake Residence

- Location within Toyama Prefecture Location within Japan

General information
- Location: Gokayama, Japan, Japan
- Coordinates: 36°24′30.25″N 136°55′55.44″E

The Habake Residence (羽馬家住宅) is one of the gasshō-zukuri houses in Tamukai Village, Nanto City, Toyama Prefecture. It is designated as an Important Cultural Property of Japan.

== Overview ==
Tamukai village, where the Habake residence is located, is on the right bank of the Shogawa River, and in the past there was no way to get to and from the village except by passing baskets. For this reason, the village was one of the penal colonies of the Kaga Domain.

The Habake residence is the oldest existing gasshō-zukuri house in the village, but the date of construction and the owner at that time are not known at all. However, most of the buildings in Tamukai village were destroyed by fire in 1769, and it is said that the Habake residence was moved from Shimamura Village after the fire. This confirmed that the building had been relocated.

Gasshō-zukuri minka are thought to have been built around the middle of the 17th century in the form of foundation stones, and although they do not exist today, it is estimated that the horitate-bashira dwellings at the Yabari Shimojima site were built during this period. The Habake residence is estimated to have been built in the latter half of the 17th century. It is smaller in scale than the gasshō-zukuri villages built after the 18th century, and is said to have retained its old form well in terms of plan configuration and shape.

The plan of the Hambake residence consists of six rooms by dividing the main building into two parts on the left and right, and dividing each part into three sections. The six rooms are divided into the four rooms, which are unique to this region, and the earthen floor niwa-maya, which shows the earliest stage of gasshō-zukuri, in which these rooms are divided in the shape of a rice field. The section for the Buddhist altar was added later, and together with the yarikanna finish method of construction, is highly valued as one of the earliest remains that show the developmental stage of the Gasshō-zukuri minka.

In addition, the narrow space between the pillars, the partition with a wooden board door, the addition of a higher sill in the hari-dai structure, and the use of a three-foot wide cupboard topped with a bag cabinet all indicate that the Houma family residence has retained its old form because it was never repaired or remodeled. Dismantling and repair work was carried out in April 1963 and completed in December of the same year. A detailed construction report of the survey and repair records conducted at that time was prepared and published.

== See also ==
- Historic Villages of Shirakawa-gō and Gokayama
- The Murakamike Residence
- The Iwaseke Residence

== Literature ==
- Taira village History Compilation Committee, ed. (1985). History of Taira village (in Japanese). Taira village.
- Saeki, Yasuichi (February 2009). A Study of the History of the Formation of the gasshō-zukuri Minka (in Japanese). Katsura Shobō. ISBN 978-4-9033-5159-9.
- Important Cultural Properties Habake Residence Repair Committee, ed. (1963). Report on the repair work of the Habake Residence, an Important Cultural Property (in Japanese). Important Cultural Properties Habake Residence Repair Committee.
