= Gyotoku-ji =

Buddhist temple in Nanto, Japan

Gyotoku-ji 行徳寺
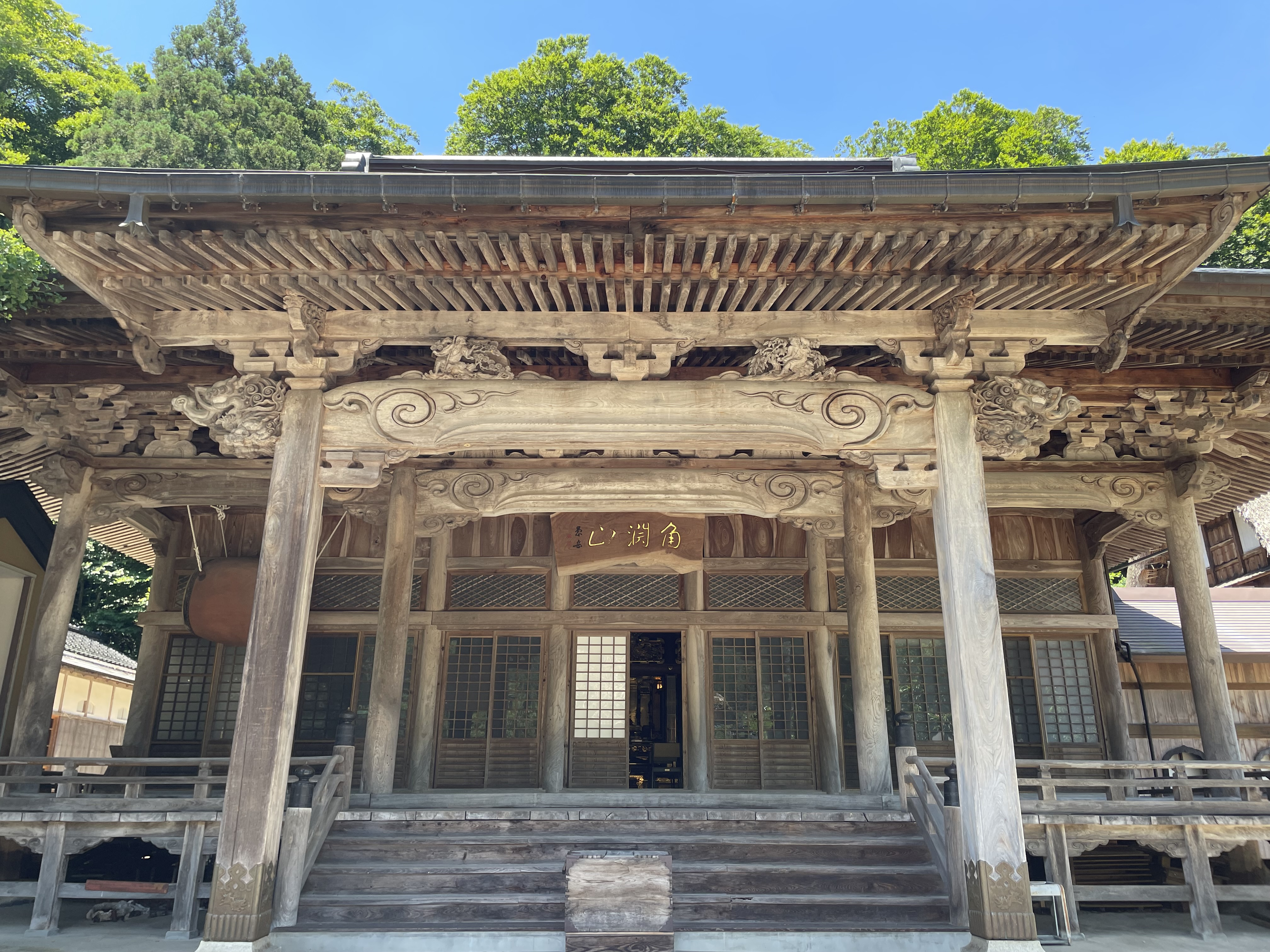
- Gyotoku-ji's Hondō (本堂)

Religion
- Affiliation: Jōdo Shinshū Ōtani-ha
- Deity: Amida Nyorai (Amitābha)

Location
- Location: 825 Nishiakao, Nanto City, Toyama Prefecture
- Country: Japan
- Interactive map of Gyotoku-ji 行徳寺
- Coordinates: 36°22′49.39″N 136°52′14.51″E

Architecture
- Founder: Akaono Doshu(赤尾道宗)

Gyotoku-ji (行徳寺) is a Jōdo Shinshū temple located in the Nishiao district of Nanto City, Toyama Prefecture. It is one of the oldest Gokayama temples.

== History ==
In the latter half of the Muromachi period, during the Bunmei (1392–1573), Rennyo(蓮如), the 8th head of Hongan-ji Temple, stayed at Yoshizaki-gobō in Echizen Province, which led to a rapid increase in Shinshū followers in the Hokuriku region, and the spread of Shinshū in earnest in the Gokayama area. The first to extend their teachings to the Gokayama region was Wada Hongaku-ji Temple in Echizen Province, and there was a monk named Jotoku(浄徳) from Akaodani who was a follower of Hongakuji Temple. The nephew of Jotoku was Akaono Doshu(赤尾道宗), a well-known Myokonin, and Doshu is positioned as the founder of Gyotoku-ji Temple.

Although there are various traditions about Doso's origin and history in later times, there is no doubt that he was a contemporary of Rennyo, as he is often mentioned in Rennyo's writings. Gyotoku-ji Temple still retains a six-character name sign in Rennyo's handwriting, and it seems that the predecessor of Gyotoku-ji Temple was formed by equipping it with these name signs. In the “Kokoroe-nijyuichi-ka-jo(21rules)” which Doshu wrote on December 24, 1501, there is mention of a “dojo(道場),” indicating that a dojo, the predecessor of Gyotoku-ji, had been established at least before 1501.

In 1864, at the end of the Edo period, the “Kuri”(a kitchen) was reconstructed, and this Kuri is still in use today. Records of the construction of the Kuri remain, and like other buildings of the same period, it seems to have been done by a carpenter from Himi.

“Kuri”(a kitchen) of this temple using “Gassho-zukuri” architecture was designated as a cultural asset by Nanto City.

== Collection and Exhibition ==
- “Kokoroe-nijyuichi-ka-jo”(21rules) written by Akaono Doshu
- “Rennyo-goshosoku”(information about Rennyo Shonin)

== Literature ==
- Toga village History Compilation Committee, ed. (2004). History of Toga village 1. Toga village.
- Taira village History Compilation Committee, ed. (1985). History of Taira village. Taira village.
- Nanto City Board of Education, ed. (2008). A bibliography of ancient literature in Gokayama-Kamitaira area. Nanto City Board of Education.
