= Iwaseke Residence =

Traditional house in Nanto, Japan

- 岩瀬家住宅
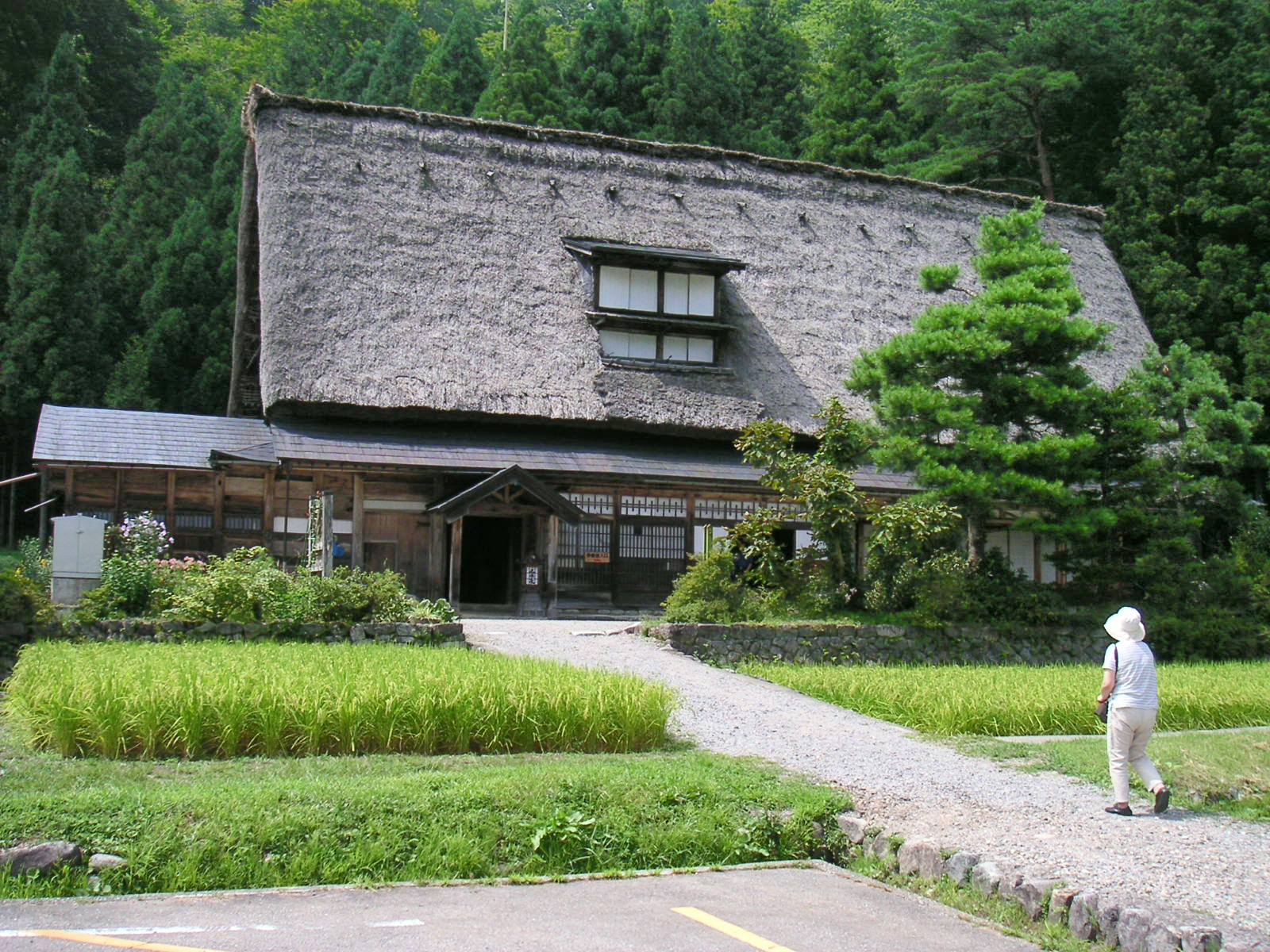
- Iwaseke Residence

- Location within Toyama Prefecture Location within Japan

General information
- Location: Gokayama, Japan, Japan
- Coordinates: 36°22′52.05″N 136°52′14.25″E

The Iwaseke Residence (岩瀬家住宅) is one of the gasshō-zukuri houses in Nishiakao-machi Village, Nanto City, Toyama Prefecture. It is designated as an Important Cultural Property of Japan.

== Overview ==
The Iwaseke Residence was built over a span of 8 years in the late Edo period by Fujii Chouemon(藤井長右衛門). It is one of the largest gasshō-zukuri structures in existence.

The Fujii Chouemon family was the second wealthiest wealthy farmer in Gokayama after the Iwabuchi-mura Iemon(岩渕村伊右衛門), family of Toga Valley, and it seems that the house was built with their ample wealth as a backdrop.

In the 19th century, the Kami-ni-ya built the finest and largest gasshō-zukuri houses in Gokayama, and the Iwaseke residence was representative of these houses and one of the largest gasshō-zukuri still in existence. In the past, as many as 35 people, including servants, lived in the house. Other known residences built around the same time include the Habake residence in Oze and the Ikutake residence in Hosozima.

According to local legend, Fujii Choemon initially asked Kakube, a prominent carpenter from Inami, to build the house, but Kakube recommended Matasaburo, a carpenter from Himi Okubo Village, instead, and the present Iwaseke residence was built by Matasaburo. Matasaburo proceeded with the construction with his excellent skills, but progress was slow due to his overly careful work, and it is said that the construction took a long time.

However, when the Tenpō famine triggered the enforcement of the Takakata-Shiho law in 1837, wealthy farmers had their crops confiscated, and the Fujii Choemon family and the Iwabuchi-mura Iemon family rapidly fell into decline. Furthermore, after the Meiji Restoration, the price of saltpeter plummeted, and the Fujii family gave up their house, which has since been owned by the Iwase family.

The Iwase family residence was designated an Important Cultural Property on May 14, 1958. It is still used as a residence today, and with some exceptions, the interior can be toured.

== See also ==
- Historic Villages of Shirakawa-gō and Gokayama
- The Murakamike Residence
- The Habake Residence

== Literature ==
- Kamitaira village, ed. (1982). History of Kamitaira village (in Japanese). Kamitaira village.
- Taira village History Compilation Committee, ed. (1985). History of Taira village (in Japanese). Taira village.
- Kosakatani, fukuji (2002). The Folk History of Gokayama (in Japanese). Kamitaira village History Compilation Committee.
- Saeki, Yasuichi (February 2009). A Study of the History of the Formation of the gasshō-zukuri Minka (in Japanese). Katsura Shobō. ISBN 978-4-9033-5159-9.
