= Gokayama bobera =

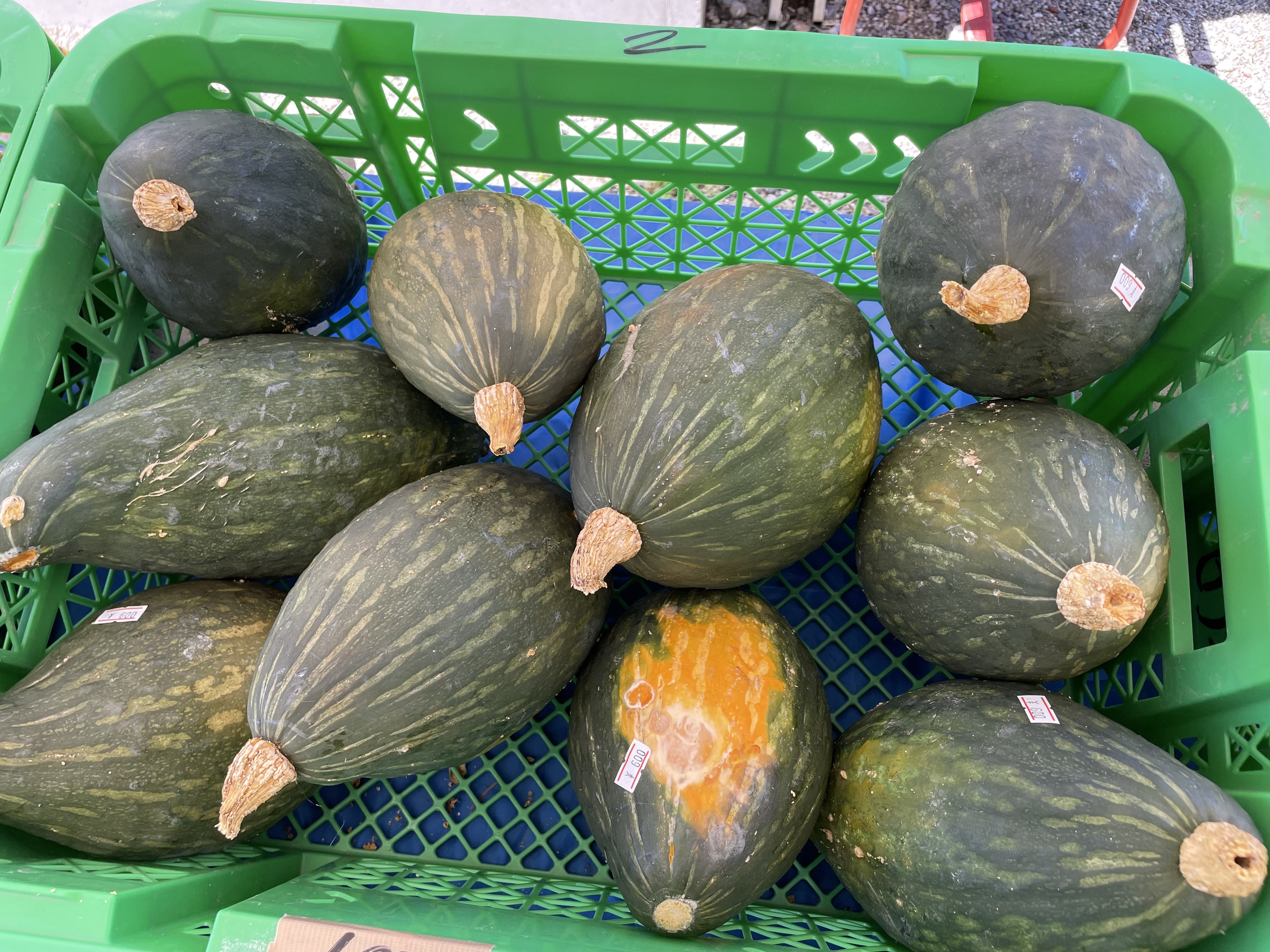
Gokayama bobera sold in the Gokayama region.

Gokayama bobera (五箇山ぼべら) is a variety of pumpkin (or squash) cultivated in the Gokayama region of Nanto City, Toyama Prefecture, Japan.

== Overview ==
In Gokayama, pumpkins have traditionally been called bobura (or bobira in the Otani region). This name is derived from the Portuguese word for pumpkin or gourd, abóbora.

Locals distinguished between round-shaped ones, called bobura, and wrinkled ones, called kiku-bobura (chrysanthemum-shaped bobura). Because the kiku-bobura had a hard rind and a long shelf life, it was traditionally believed that eating it on the winter solstice would prevent stroke (cerebrovascular disease).

The Gokayama bobera is shaped like a rugby ball. Similar to common pumpkins, it features a dark green exterior and an orange flesh.

Each pumpkin weighs between 1.5 kg and 3.5 kg. Its notable characteristics include a soft rind, a strong sweetness, and a texture that becomes thick, creamy, and intensely sweet when cooked.

Before selective breeding efforts, the original bobera had a low crop yield and irregular sizes. Consequently, by the early 21st century, its cultivation was maintained by only a very small number of farmers.

However, in 2004, an official from the Toyama Prefecture Vegetable Association discovered the existence of the bobera during a survey conducted to create a booklet titled "Traditional Vegetables of Toyama." Following this discovery, prefecture officials led selective breeding initiatives, which helped expand its cultivation.

In 2013, the "Gassho no Mori Renewal Council" was established, and as part of its "Gassho no Mori Project," it began efforts to brand the bobera.

Through this initiative, the pumpkins—which had previously been shipped under the generic name "Gokayama Pumpkin"—were unified under the brand name "Gokayama bobera" for commercial marketing.

In the Araya settlement of the Kamitaira region, "Cafe Yoriaidokoro Maruike," which functions as both a local specialty retail shop and a community café, opened across from Dōzen-ji temple in March 2020 and sells bobera.

== Cultivation ==
In Gokayama, the thatched roofs of the Gasshō-zukuri houses are re-roofed every 20-odd years. The old, discarded thatch is tilled into the soil to be used as compost. Gokayama bobera is still cultivated today using this traditional agricultural method involving old thatch.

Additionally, the significant temperature fluctuations between day and night, characteristic of the mountainous terrain of the Gokayama region, are said to produce the deep, rich flavor of the bobera.

The cultivation process begins in May with seed sowing and seedling nursing, alongside land preparation. In late May, the seedlings are transplanted into the fields, and in June, the old thatch is spread around them as they grow. Harvesting takes place from late August, and the produce is marketed and sold from around September through November.

== Culinary Use ==
In ancient times, bobera was cooked in a pot and mixed with millet or buckwheat flour before being divided into bowls for consumption. It was also boiled with salt, and its seeds were sometimes dried, roasted, and crushed to be used like sesame seeds (a preparation known locally as kōbashi).

== Distribution ==
Bobera is primarily sold at roadside stations and local direct-sales shops within the Gokayama region. Because fresh bobera rots easily, roadside stations mainly stock processed goods such as bobera monaka (a type of wagashi filled with bobera paste) or dried bobera, while fresh bobera and various processed products are available at the direct-sales shops.

In recent years, it has also been featured once or twice a year at Aeon and MaxValu supermarkets within Toyama and Ishikawa Prefectures.

== Commercialization ==
As mentioned previously, the short shelf life of fresh bobera led to significant food waste, which posed a challenge for producers. However, in the late 2010s, a technology to puree and freeze-preserve the bobera was established, which has since been used to develop a wide variety of commercial products.

Commercial items created from the pumpkin include roll cakes, Mont Blanc, soft serve ice cream, puddings, monaka, curry, and udon noodles.

In particular, "dried bobera," which was developed in recent years, has garnered attention as a long-lasting product that effectively preserves and highlights the natural flavor of the ingredient.

== Bibliography ==
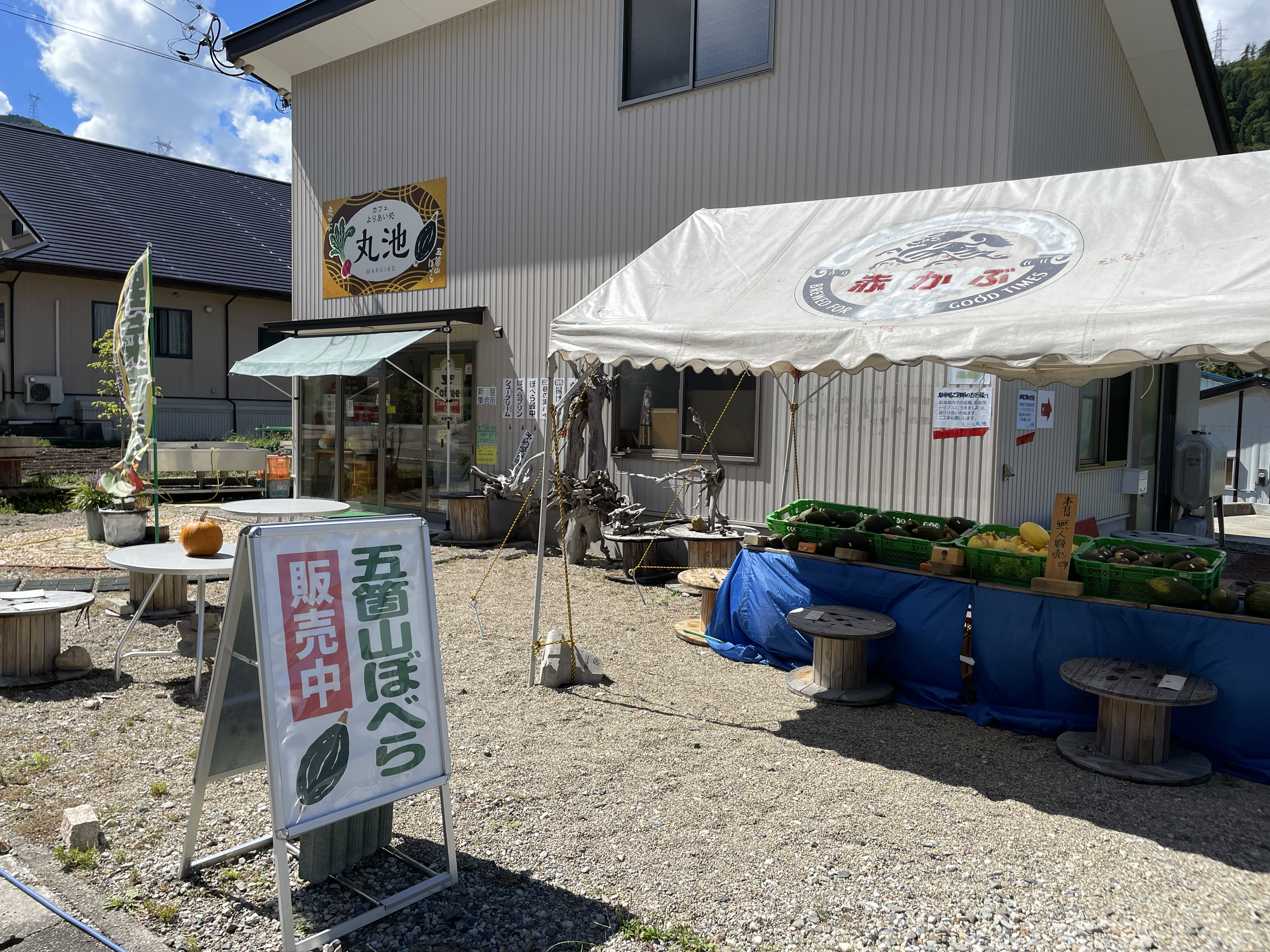
Yoriaidokoro Maruike selling Gokayama bobera.

- Rena Sasaki (2021). "伝統野菜「ぼべら」のブランド化と発信 (Branding and Promotion of the Traditional Vegetable "Bobera")". 金沢大学文化人類学研究室調査実習報告書 (Kanazawa University Cultural Anthropology Laboratory Fieldwork Report) (in Japanese) (36). Department of Cultural Anthropology, Faculty of Human and Social Sciences, Kanazawa University: 87–97.
