= Historic Villages of Shirakawa-gō and Gokayama =

World Heritage Site in Japan

Historic Villages of Shirakawa-go and Gokayama
UNESCO World Heritage Site
- Shirakawa-gō in 2009

- Location within Japan
- Location: Gifu Prefecture and Toyama Prefecture in Chūbu region, Honshu, Japan
- Includes: 1. Ogimachi Village; 2. Ogimachi Village 2; 3. Ainokura Village; 4. Suganuma Village
- Criteria: Cultural: (iv), (v)
- Reference: 734
- Inscription: 1995 (19th Session)
- Area: 68 ha (170 acres)
- Buffer zone: 58,873.1 ha (145,479 acres)
- Coordinates: 36°24′N 136°53′E

The Historic Villages of Shirakawa-gō and Gokayama are one of Japan's UNESCO World Heritage Sites. The cultural property consists of three historic mountain villages over an area of 68 hectares (170 acres) in the remote Shogawa river valley, stretching across the border of Gifu and Toyama Prefectures in central Japan. Shirakawa-gō (白川郷, "White River Old-District") is located in the village of Shirakawa in Gifu Prefecture. The Gokayama (五箇山, "Five Mountains") area is divided between the former villages of Kamitaira and Taira in Nanto, Toyama Prefecture.

The valley is in a mountain region with considerable snowfall, and these villages are well known for their clusters of farmhouses, constructed in the architectural style known as gasshō-zukuri (合掌造り), which are designed to easily shed snow from their steep roofs.

== Geography ==
The three villages are situated in a remote valley, surrounded by high and rugged mountains which receive particularly high snowfall in winter. Remoteness and difficulty of access severely restricted the connection of this region with the outside world until around the 1950s. This isolation led to the development of its unique culture and traditions, including the architectural tradition of the Gassho-style farmhouses which has been handed down through the generations. For some time this region was known as 'the last unexplored area of Japan'.

The Shō River lies in the centre of this region. It rises in the southern mountains, then flows northwards towards the Japan Sea along a deep, winding and narrow valley, surrounded by mountains rising to a height of 1,500 metres (4,921 ft). As a result of this steep terrain, the majority of villages in this area are situated in the narrow strips of land along the valley bottom.

== History ==
Mt Hakusan is the principal mountain in this area, and has been regarded as a sacred summit since ancient times. In the 8th century, the Shirakawa-gō and Gokayama area became a location for ascetic religious practices, and mountain worship centred on Mt Hakusan.

For a long time afterward, the region was under the control of the Tendai sect of Buddhist Japan. The tradition of Ochi-udo Densetsu (legend of defeated warriors who flee to the remote areas) remains today, no doubt as a result of its remote, isolated and mountainous nature. Tendai sect religion was replaced in the 13th century by the Jodo Shin sect, which remains the main religious influence to the present day.

Nowadays all three villages within the world heritage site belong to the modern-day administrative organisation of the Mura system.

== Agriculture and industry ==
The area's mountainous terrain and paucity of flat land offered little opportunity for the traditional cultivation of rice. Farmers historically supplemented their yield with other grains such as buckwheat and millet. Nevertheless, agriculture was only at the level of subsistence farming. The marketable products coming from the area were Japanese paper (washi), nitre for gunpowder manufacture, and sericulture (silkworm farming). The production of silkworms has been traced back to the 16th century, but only got established as a side industry in the late 17th century. It thrived right up until the 1970s (except for a period during the second World War) but has since entirely disappeared. It was the requirement for large quantities of indoor space for silkworm beds and for the storage of their food supply (mulberry leaves) that led to the Gassho-style house, with its multi-leveled division of their roof spaces to increase the functional area of.

== House construction ==
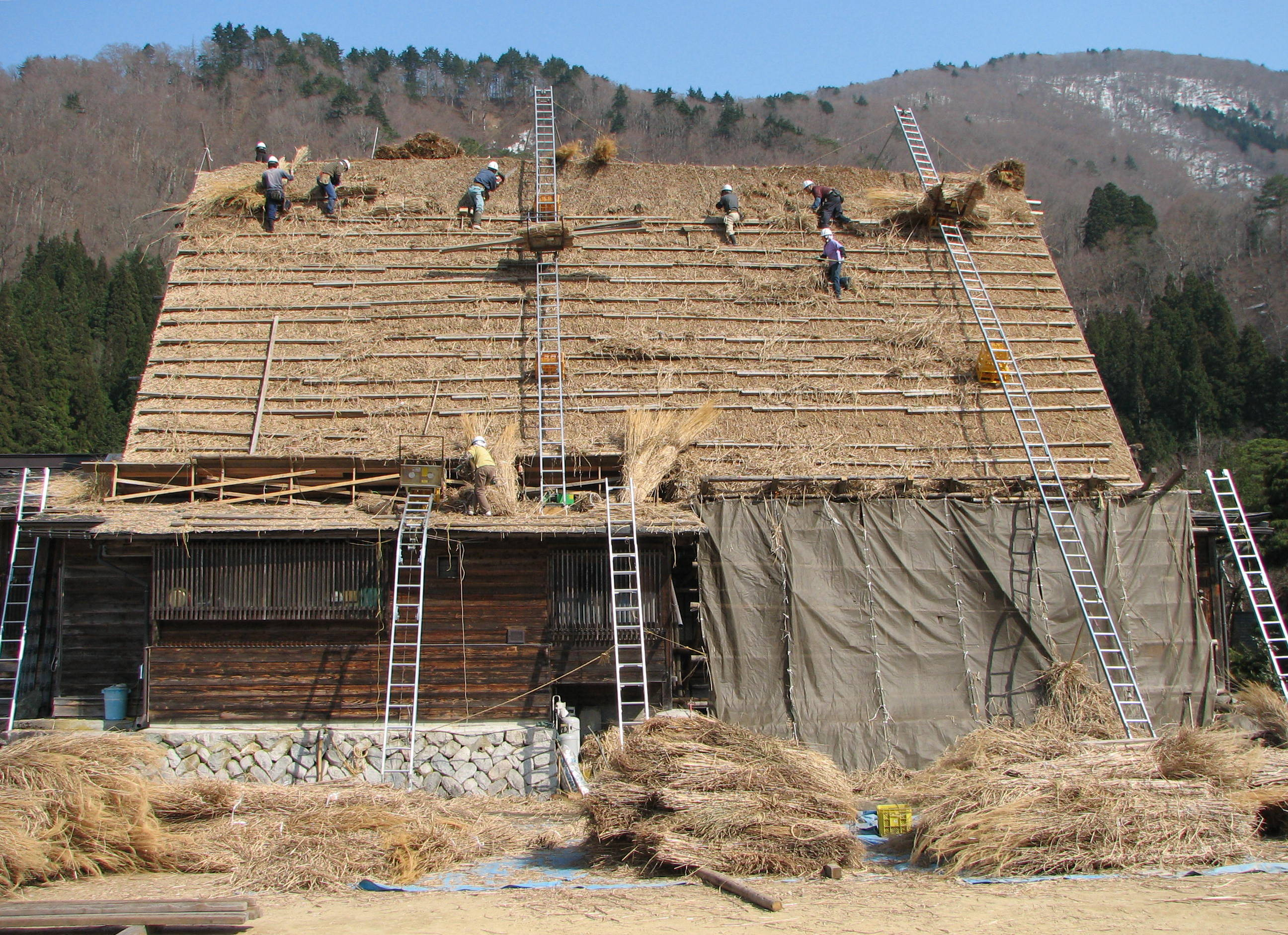
Gassho-style farmhouse being re-thatched in 2008

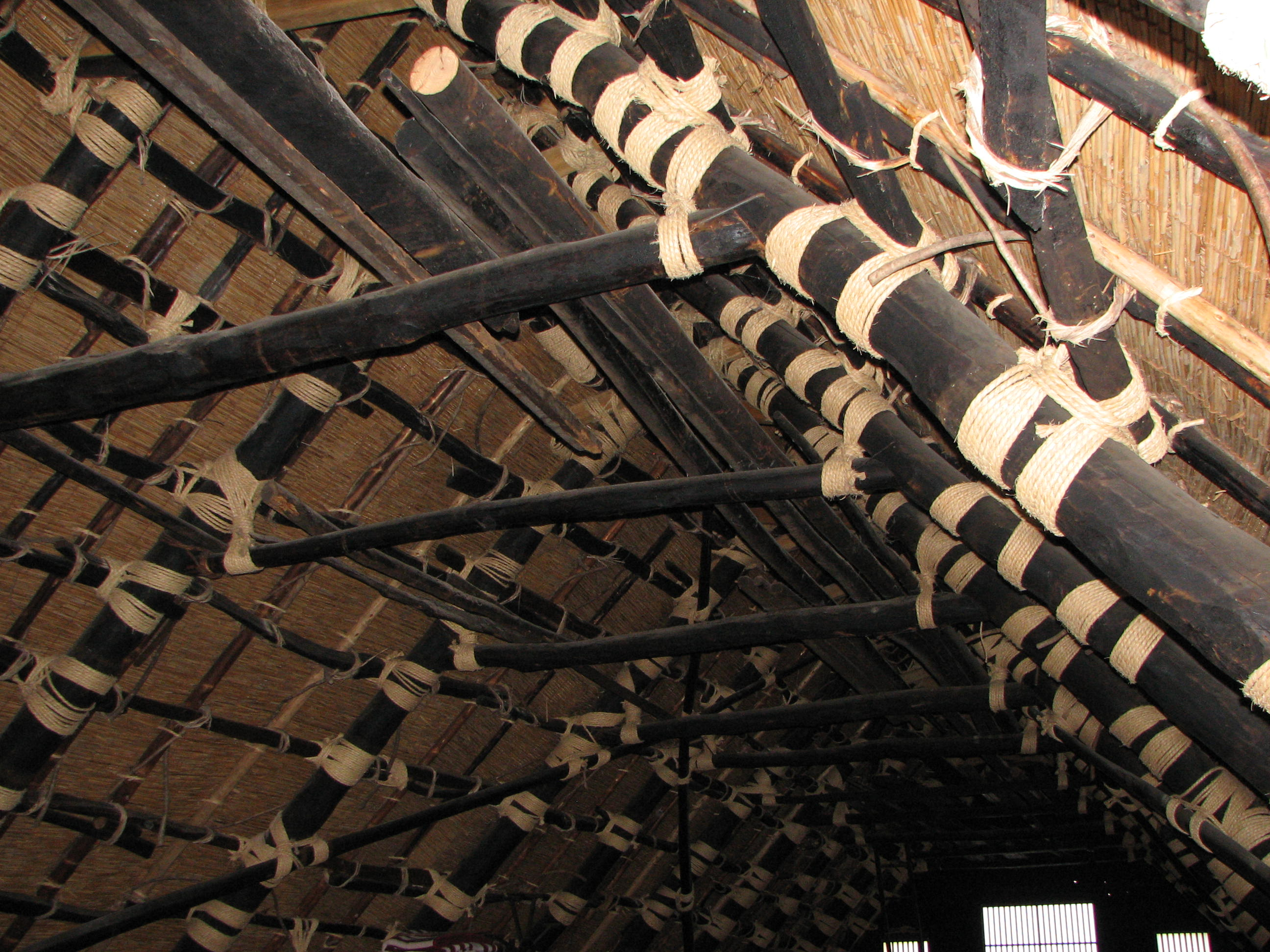
Interior roof construction of Gassho-style farmhouse

The Gasshō-style house ("prayer-hands construction" style) is characterized by a steeply slanting thatched roof, resembling two hands joined in prayer. The design is exceptionally strong and, in combination with the unique properties of the thatching, allows the houses to withstand and shed the weight of the region's heavy snowfalls in winter.

The houses are large, with three to four stories encompassed between the low eaves, and historically intended to house large extended families and highly efficient space for a variety of industries. The densely forested mountains of the region still occupy 96% of all land in the area, and before the introduction of heavy earth-moving machinery, the narrow bands of flat lands running the length of the river valley limited the area available for agriculture and homestead development. The upper stories of the gasshō houses were usually set aside for sericulture, while the areas below the first (ground) floor were often used for the production of nitre, one of the raw materials needed for the production of gunpowder.

The Gassho-style house is architecturally one of Japan's most important and rare types of farmhouse. The clustering of so many surviving examples has given the World Heritage Site its justification for inscription (i.e. formal recognition). This confident style of house construction is unique within Japan, and nowhere else within the country is roof space typically utilized, except for passive storage, and not in a two, three, or four-story manner, as is seen here.

Even today, there is still a system of joint work called "yui" for re-thatching thatched roofs of gassho-zukuri. The thatch replacement was done every 30 to 40 years, and the labor and expense involved was enormous (simply converting the labor cost to today's value, it is said that the cost to replace one side of the roof alone would be more than 10 million yen), but it was done without compensation.

The procedure for re-thatching was rough as follows:

- Preparation begins at least three years prior to the work.
- The amount of thatch needed and the number of workers are estimated based on the area of the roof. It takes 200 to 300 workers daily.
- Set a date for the work and go around the village to ask for help with the thatching and when it will be done.
- Cut and store enough thatch for the work in advance (a common "thatch field" is reserved for this purpose).
- Determine the division of roles (i.e., those who collect thatch, those who carry it, those who sort thatch, those who prepare ropes and other tools, etc.).
- The above is exclusively the work of men. The women prepare meals for the workers, snacks for the rest, and gifts to celebrate the completion of the work.
- Rarely are both sides of the roof sprayed at the same time, but only one side is completed in two days.

In recent years, depopulation, the decline of primary industries, and the aging of the population have made it difficult to maintain ties. On the other hand, the National Trust and volunteers from the general public have begun to gather from various parts of the country and work together to re-thatch the roofs. In Shirakawa-go, the organization that performs the tethering is called "koryaku," and the scope of the tethering is not limited to re-thatching roofs, but extends to all aspects of daily life, including thatching, rice planting, rice harvesting, weeding, chopping firewood, weddings, funerals, and ceremonial occasions.

== World Heritage Site ==
The world heritage site consists of three historic mountain villages, Ogimachi, Ainokura, and Suganuma, surrounded by the steep forested mountains of the Chubu Region within central Japan. Ogimachi is located in Shirakawa-go, while Ainokura and Suganuma are in Gokayama. In total, the area inscribed as a world heritage site for these three villages is 68 hectares (0.68 km^{2}). However, each village area is protected within a buffer zone (Buffer Zone I) in which strict regulation preserves the historic environment. This is contained by a much larger secondary zone (Buffer Zone II), totaling 545.38 square kilometres (210.57 sq mi) in which development actions over a certain scale are controlled to preserve the natural environment and the cultural landscape.

The Committee decided to inscribe the site under criteria (iv) and (v) as the villages are outstanding examples of a traditional human settlement that is perfectly adapted to its environment. The Committee noted the successful adaptation to economic changes and that survival can only be assured through constant vigilance on both sides, the Government authorities and the inhabitants.

— World Heritage Committee, Convention Concerning the Protection of the World Cultural and Natural Heritage.

=== Ogimachi village ===
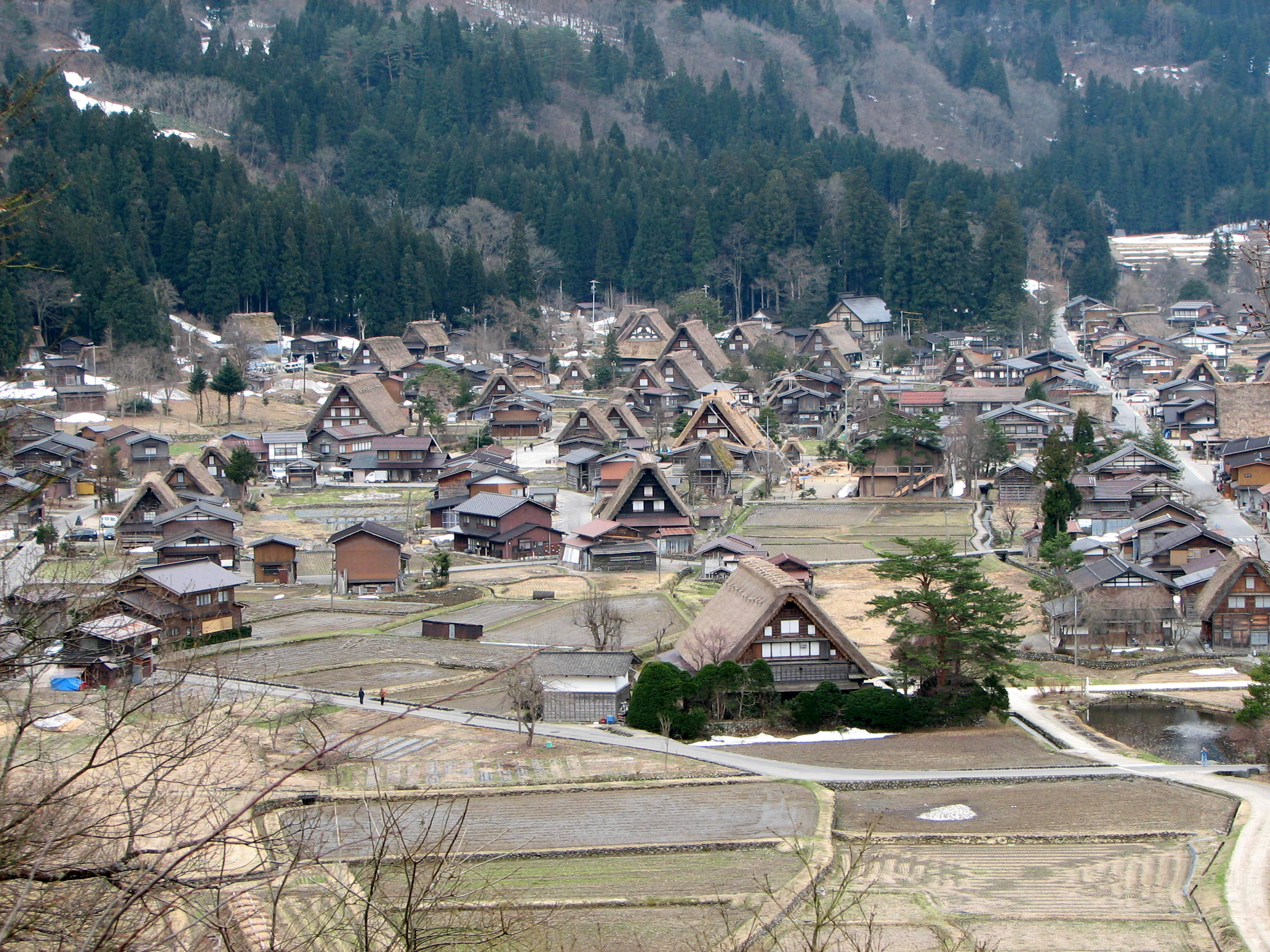
Ogimachi Village

Around the time of its formal inscription as a World Heritage Site (August 1994), Ogimachi contained 152 households and had a population of 634 people. Documents from 1876 showed that the Ogimachi Village had 99 households at that time, and was the largest of 23 villages falling within the Shirakawa-Muri. The central part of the village is on a terrace on the eastern side of the Shō River, some 1500 metres in length and 350 metres wide, and is at an altitude of around 500 metres.

Most of the farmhouses are separated from one another by plots of cultivated land. A network of small roads some 2 to 4 metres in width connect these houses and dates back to the Edo period. A more dominant, 6m-wide roadway runs north-south through the centre of the village, and is more recent, having been constructed in 1890. Those houses built on steep ground near the base of the mountains are situated on small terraces, supported by stone walls. Property boundaries tend to be defined by the network of small roads, so the village has an open nature to it. Most land plots for either rice or grain production are very small, with larger plots of land found on the north and south side of the village. A Shinto shrine which houses the deity that guards the village is located in the south-central part of the village. There are also two Buddhist temples of the Jodo Shinsu sect.

117 buildings and seven additional structures are included in the designation of 'historic buildings of Ogimachi Village' to be preserved. Amongst these are 59 Gassho-style farmhouses, mostly constructed between the end of the Edo period and the end of the Meiji period. (i.e. early 19th to early 20th century). All the ridges of these Gassho-style houses are aligned parallel to the Shō River, thus creating a unified and attractive village scene.

=== Ainokura village ===
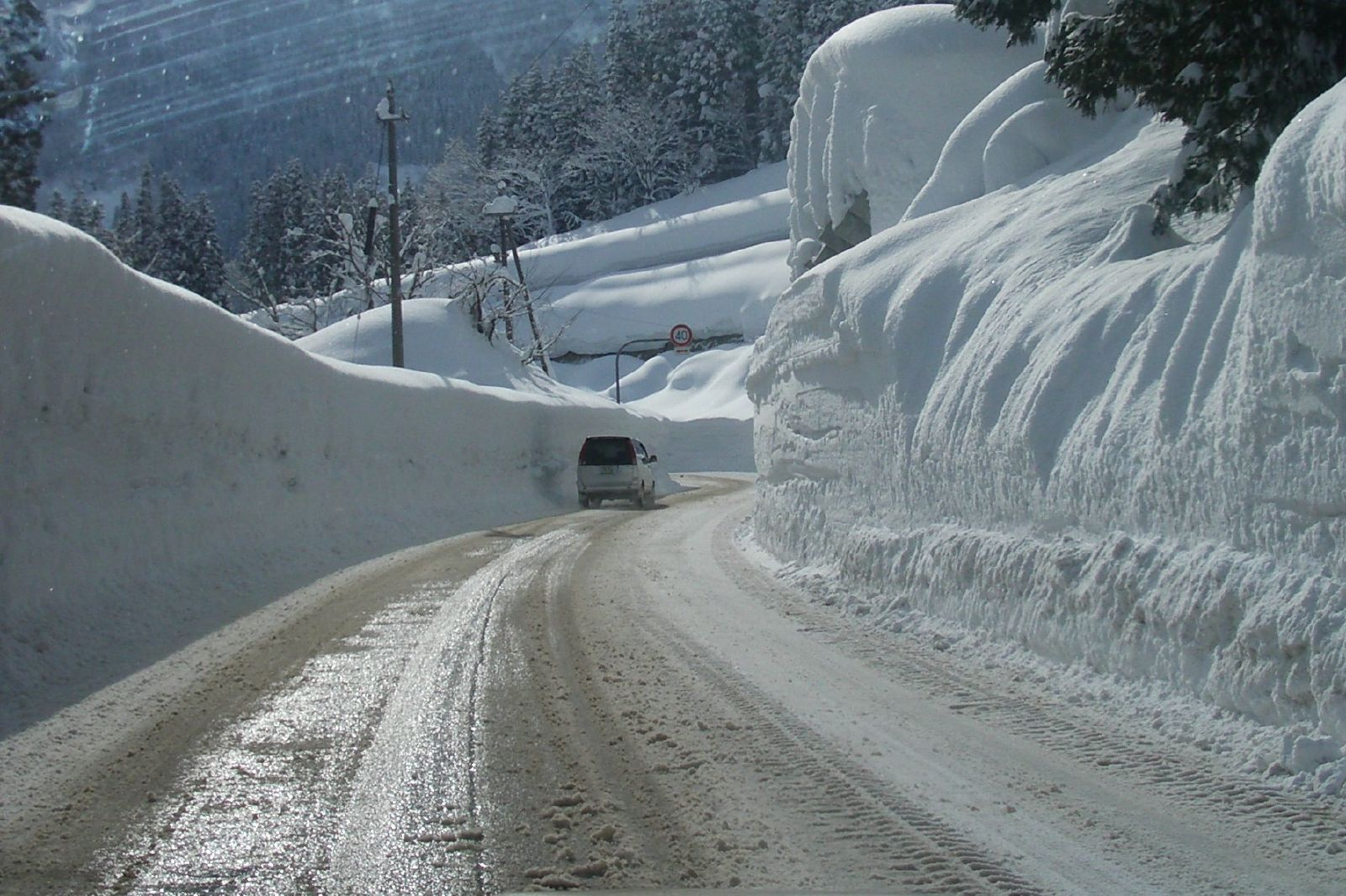
Near Ainokura in January 2006

The village is situated on a high but narrow terraced plateau to the west of, and well above, the Shō River. Surrounded by mountains and forests, Ainokura lies at an altitude of around 400 metres. An old narrow road runs northeast to southwest through the village centre, eventually becoming the main mountain access route that was constructed in 1887. However, a new and wider roadway was built in 1958 which rather disrupts the vista through the village.

As of August 1994, there were 27 households in Ainokura Village, creating a population of 90 individuals. However, in 1887 there were 47 households, making it then the fourth largest of the 25 villages in the Taira-mura area. Most houses are situated on flat, open terraces with stone retaining walls and little space around them. Those irrigated rice fields which surround the areas of housing are small and irregular in shape. Larger rice fields are found on the northeast side of the village. Some of the higher ones were originally used for cultivating mulberry trees for silkworm production. Ainokura Village had the strongest sericulture tradition of all the villages in Taira-mura. However, the industry declined here in the 1950s when a push for self-sufficiency in food led to the mulberry fields being converted to rice production. Water for irrigation is mostly brought in by an aqueduct system that runs from a river valley in the mountains to the west of the village and passes through a network of fine canals within the village.

67 buildings and five additional structures are included in the designation of 'historic buildings of Ainokura Village' to be preserved. Of these, 20 Gassho-style farmhouses were originally included, but this has since increased to 23. Most date from the end of the Edo period to the end of the Meiji period (i.e. early 19th to early 20th century), but the oldest of them dates back to the late 17th century. Room plans were either a four-room square, or a larger six-room structure, plus their earthen-floor space. The Shinto shrine housing the village deity is located on high ground near the village centre and is nowadays surrounded by Japanese cedar trees. A Buddhist temple of the Jodo Shinshu sect forms the religious centre of the community.

=== Suganuma village ===
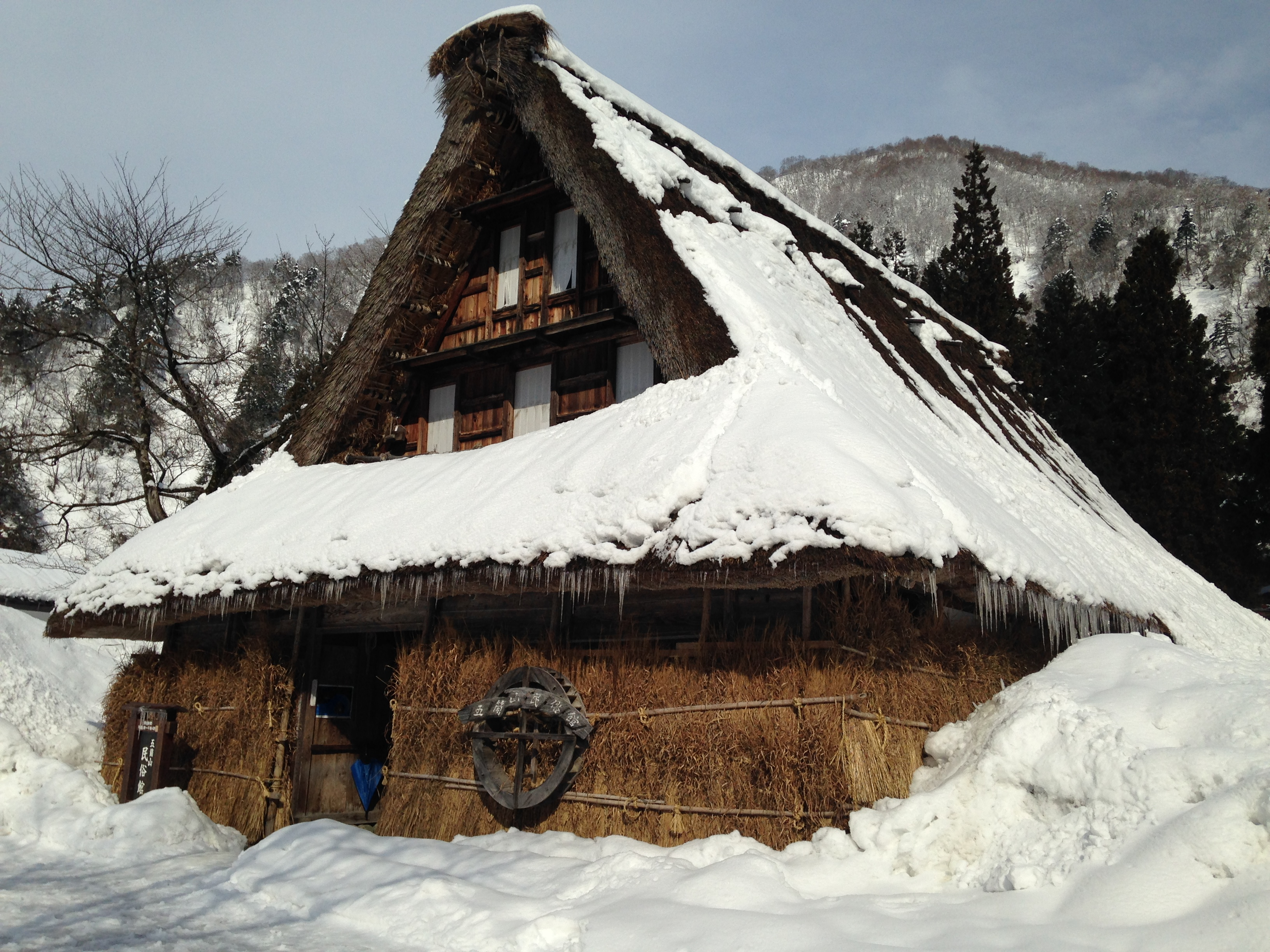
Gokayama Folklore Museum in January 2015

Suganuma is the smallest of the three villages in the World Heritage Site, containing just 8 households and having a population of 40, as of 1994. Records from 1889 reveal that there were then 13 households in the village, making it the 9th largest of the 19 villages in the Kamitaira-mura area. The village is at an altitude of about 330 metres and is situated on a terraced plateau, just 230 metres by 240 metres in size, and with steep mountain slopes to the south. The forests on these slopes are also protected by the World Heritage Site to hold snow back from the village. Felling of trees here is prohibited.

Apart from one large irrigated rice field on the lower side of the village, all other rice fields or crop plots surround the farmhouses themselves. Irrigation was only introduced in 1945; before that, the land was used for mulberry tree cultivation to support silkworm production.

28 buildings and two other structures are included in the designation of 'historic buildings of Suganama Village' to be preserved. Nine Gassho-style houses now remain, of which two were built towards the end of the Edo period (i.e. early 19th century), and six others were constructed in the Meiji period (i.e. between 1868 and 1912). The last Gassho-style house to be constructed here was built in 1926. Storehouses were either of wood or earth wall construction and were built away from the houses to reduce the risk of fire. The Shinto shrine for the village deity is nowadays located on a slight rise but has twice been relocated since the 1930s.

=== Conservation ===
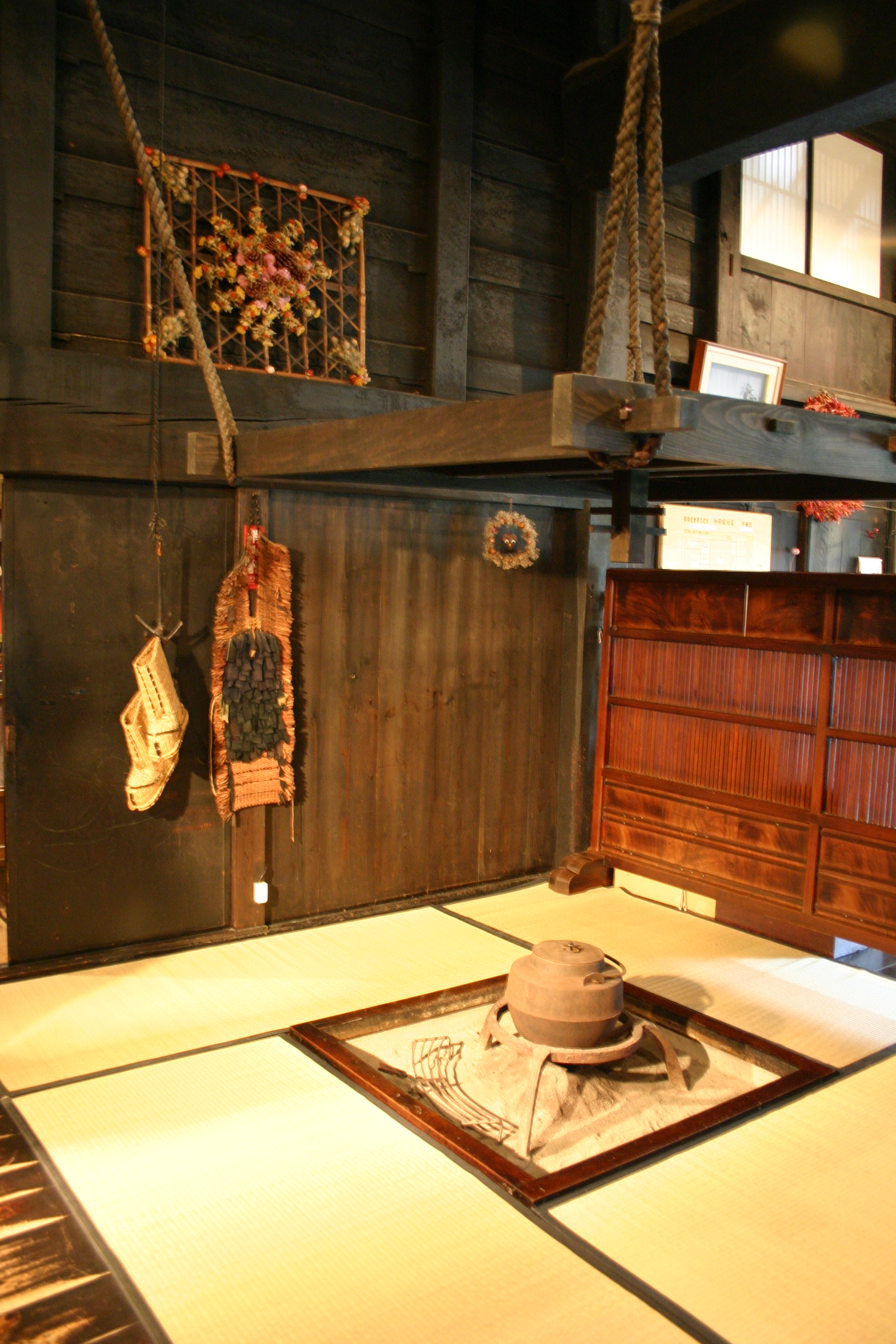
Fireplace of Shirakawa-gō

Because of the manner of their construction, fire is a serious risk to the many properties within the world heritage site. All three villages are equipped with complex fire-extinguishing systems, and residents are organised into fire-fighting squads.

As well as being inscribed as a world heritage site, the suite of properties in these villages is also defined as 'Important Preservation Districts for Groups of Historic Buildings, as defined within Japan's Law for Protection of Cultural Properties. This required preservation plans to be prepared to ensure the protection from damage and restriction on activities which could destroy either the properties themselves or alter the existing landscape.

Each owner is directly responsible for the management and repair of their property, although this is supervised to ensure they use traditional methods and materials and followed the agreed preservation plans. Overall responsibility for the protection of the historic villages lies with the Agency for Cultural Affairs of the Government of Japan, in conjunction with other bodies such as Japan's Ministry of the Environment, Ministry of Agriculture, Forestry and Fisheries (including the Forestry Agency), the Ministry of Land, Infrastructure, Transport and Tourism, Toyama Prefecture, Gifu Prefecture, Shirakawa Village and Nanto City.

== See also ==
- Tourism in Japan
- List of World Heritage Sites in Japan
- Shirakawa, Gifu (village)
- The Murakamike Residence
- The Iwaseke Residence
- The Habake Residence
