= Gokayama =

Heritage Listed area in Toyama Prefecture, Japan

Gokayama (五箇山)
UNESCO World Heritage Site
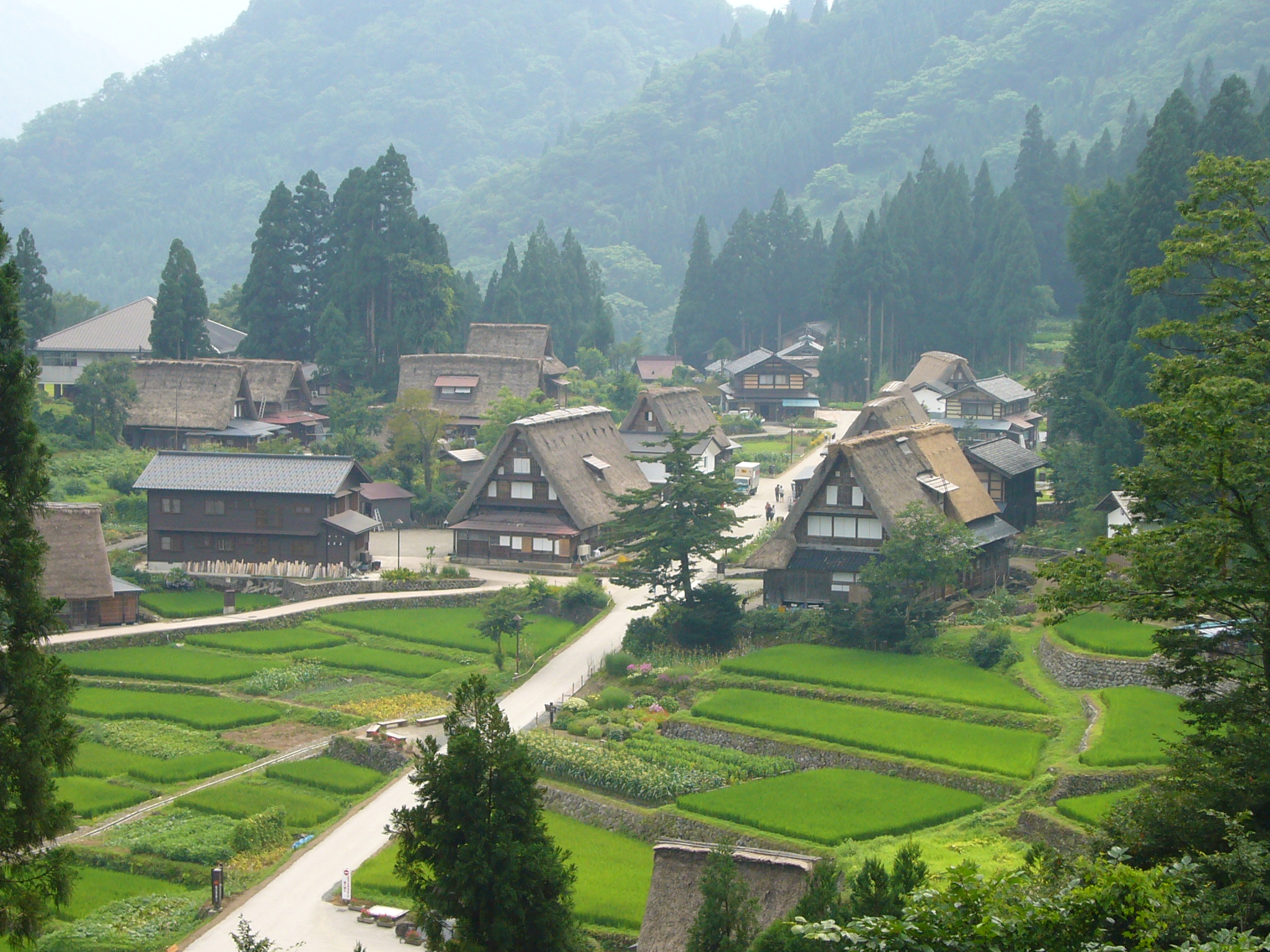
- Gasshō-zukuri houses in Gokayama

- Location within Toyama Prefecture Location within Japan
- Location: Nanto, Toyama, Japan
- Criteria: Cultural: (iv)(v)
- Reference: 734
- Inscription: 1995 (19th Session)
- Coordinates: 36°25′32″N 136°56′8.6″E
- National Historic Site of Japan

Gokayama (Japanese: 五箇山) is an area within the city of Nanto in Toyama Prefecture, Japan. It has been inscribed on the UNESCO World Heritage List due to its traditional gasshō-zukuri houses, alongside nearby Shirakawa-gō in Gifu Prefecture. The survival of this traditional architectural style is attributed to the region's secluded location in the upper reaches of the Shōgawa river. This is also the reason that Gokayama's lifestyle and culture remained very traditional for many years after the majority of the country had modernized. Many of the houses surpass 300 years in age.

The Gokayama region includes the former villages of Taira, Kamitaira, and Toga. The gasshō hamlet of Ainokura is located in Taira, while that of Suganuma is in Kamitaira; both are nationally designated Historic Sites.

== Ainokura ==
Ainokura hamlet (相倉集落, Ainokura shuraku), in the Gokayama region, was inscribed on the World Heritage List in December 1995 as one of the three villages of gassho-style houses.

Ainokura has 20 gassho-style houses known as minka. Most of them are 100 to 200 years old, and the oldest is said to have been built some 400 years ago. The gassho roof has a slope of about 60 degrees forming a nearly equilateral triangle. This steep pitch allows snow to slide off the roof easily. The enormous roof is supported by stout oak beams called chonabari, which are curved at the base. The roofs are rethatched every 15 to 20 years. Nowadays this is done by Gokayama Forest Owners' Cooperative.

Fumihito, Prince Akishino stayed at an Ainokura inn two times. The first time was when he was a second-year student at the Gakushūin high-school when he took part in a summer geography training seminar. While staying in Ainkoura, he said, "I like three places in the world most, one of them is Gokayama". The second time was nine years after that with his wife.

== Suganuma ==
Suganuma hamlet (菅沼集落, Suganuma shuraku) is surrounded on three sides by the Shōgawa River. There are currently 12 houses in the village, nine of which are gassho-zukuri style houses. Two were built in the late Edo period (early to mid-19th century), six were built in the Meiji period, and the newest one was built in 1925. During the Edo period, the economy of Gokayama was based on Japanese paper, sericulture, and the production of saltpeter, which is the raw material for gunpowder. The inhabitants of Suganuma hamlet also practiced rice cultivation using a small amount of land and slash-and-burn agriculture.

== Shinto shrine ==
- Kaminashi Hakusan Shrine(上梨白山宮)
- Kagodo Hakusan Shrine(籠渡白山社)
- Shimonashi zinushi Shrine(下梨地主神社)
- Takasōrei kumano Shrine(高草嶺熊野社)
- Sugio shinmei Shrine(杉尾神明社)
- Ōmamedani hachiman Shrine(大豆谷八幡宮)
- Sakaue hachiman Shrine(坂上八幡宮)
- Hosojima kumano Shrine(細島熊野社)
- Abetto shimmei Shrine(阿別当神明宮)
- Kaimukura sumiyoshi Shrine(皆葎住吉神社)
- Higashiakao hachiman Shrine(東赤尾八幡宮)
- Nishiakao hachiman Shrine(西赤尾八幡社)

== Buddhist architecture ==
- Gyotoku-ji（赤尾行徳寺）
- Saishi-ji(坂上西勝寺)
- Zuigan-ji(下梨瑞願寺)
- Dozen-ji(新屋道善寺)
- Seiko-ji(楮村聖光寺)
- Shomyo-ji(大島称名寺)
- Enjo-ji(上梨円浄寺)
- Honkyo-ji(中畑本教寺)
- Kenkaku-ji(見座見覚寺)
- Sonen-ji(相倉相念寺)
- Kairen-ji(皆葎皆蓮寺)
- Komyo-ji(田向光明寺)
- Koshin-ji(利賀興真寺)
- Tochihara nenbutsu dojo(栃原念仏道場)
- Sugawa nenbutsu dojo(寿川念仏道場)
- Kaminakada nenbutsu dojo(上中田念仏道場)
- Urushidani nenbutsu dojo(漆谷念仏道場)

== International relations ==
=== Twin towns – Sister cities ===
Gokayama is twinned with:

- Alberobello, Italy

== See also ==
- Historic Villages of Shirakawa-gō and Gokayama
- List of Historic Sites of Japan (Toyama)
- World Heritage Sites in Japan
- Gyotoku-ji
- The Murakamike Residence
- The Iwaseke Residence
- The Habake Residence
- Gokayama bobera
