= Gyoka =

Gyoka (Japanese: 漁家, lit. "fishing house") serve as a fishermen's house in Japanese village settings, found throughout Japan, most notably in Niigata Prefecture. It is a category of the Japanese vernacular architecture known as Minka ("folk dwellings"). Gyoka houses typically met the needs of wealthy merchants and landowners, most often fishers.

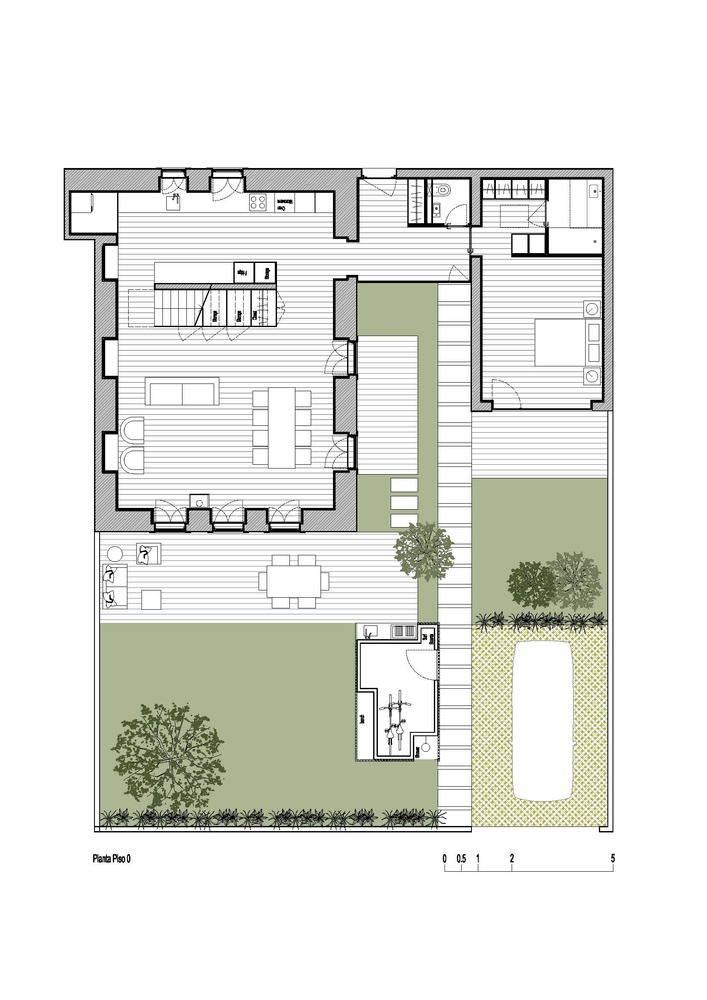
Layout of a Gyoka fishermen's house in Japan

Since they had wealthy owners, Gyoka became characterized by their elaborate, opulent architectural design. They often included inner courtyards, gardens, wooden sliding doors, and woven straw tatami mats.

== Materials and usage ==
Gyoka houses usually are built out of wood, brick, and stone. It also follows the traditional Japanese Minka convention of thatched shingle roofing. The interior uses rice straw for the tatami mats and bamboo for structural components.

These houses can be found in Niigata Prefecture in central Japan. In the Gyoka in this prefecture, a large central post marked the boundary between the doma (土間), the earth-floored area, and the kyoshitsubu (居室部), the living rooms.
