= Sakuraga-ike Dam (Toyama) =

Dam in Toyama Prefecture, Japan

Sakuraga-ike
- Location within Japan
- Location: Toyama Prefecture, Japan
- Coordinates: 36°30′03″N 136°52′08″E
- Opening date: 1954

Dam and spillways
- Height: 27 m (89 ft)
- Length: 432 m (1,417 ft)

Reservoir
- Total capacity: 1,452,000 m^{3} (51,300,000 cu ft)
- Catchment area: 10.9 km^{2} (4.2 sq mi)
- Surface area: 17 hectares (42 acres)

Sakuraga-ike is an earthfill dam located in Toyama prefecture in Japan. The dam is used for irrigation. The catchment area of the dam is 10.9 km^{2}. The dam impounds about 17 ha of land when full and can store 1452 thousand cubic meters of water. The construction of the dam was completed in 1954.
