= Minka =

Japanese vernacular house

Coordinates: 36°24′N 136°53′E

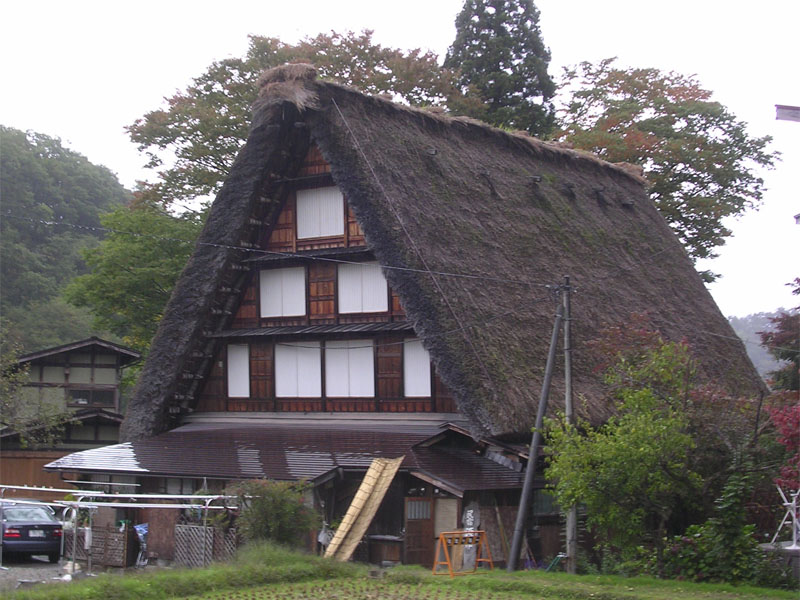
A gasshō-zukuri-styled minka home in Shirakawa village, Gifu Prefecture

Minka (Japanese: 民家; lit. 'folk houses'), sometimes called kominka (古民家; lit. 'old folk houses') are vernacular houses constructed in any one of several traditional Japanese building styles. In the context of the four divisions of society, Minka were the dwellings of farmers, artisans, and merchants (i.e., the three non-samurai castes). This connotation no longer exists in the modern Japanese language, and any traditional Japanese-style residence of appropriate age could be referred to as Minka.

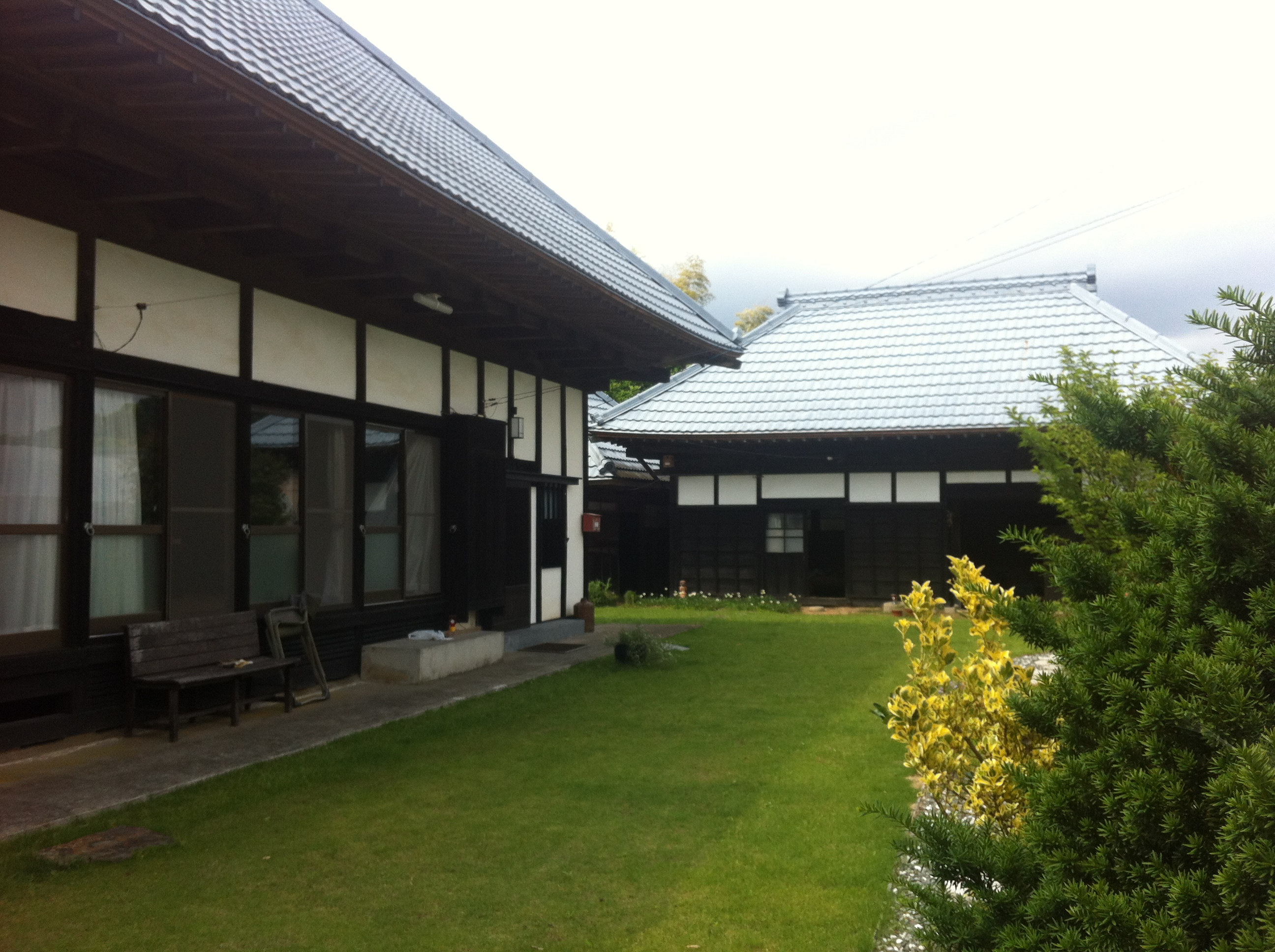
Okugame minka farmhouse

Minka are characterized by their basic structure, their roof structure, and their roof shape. Minka developed through history with distinctive styles emerging in the Edo period.

== Types ==
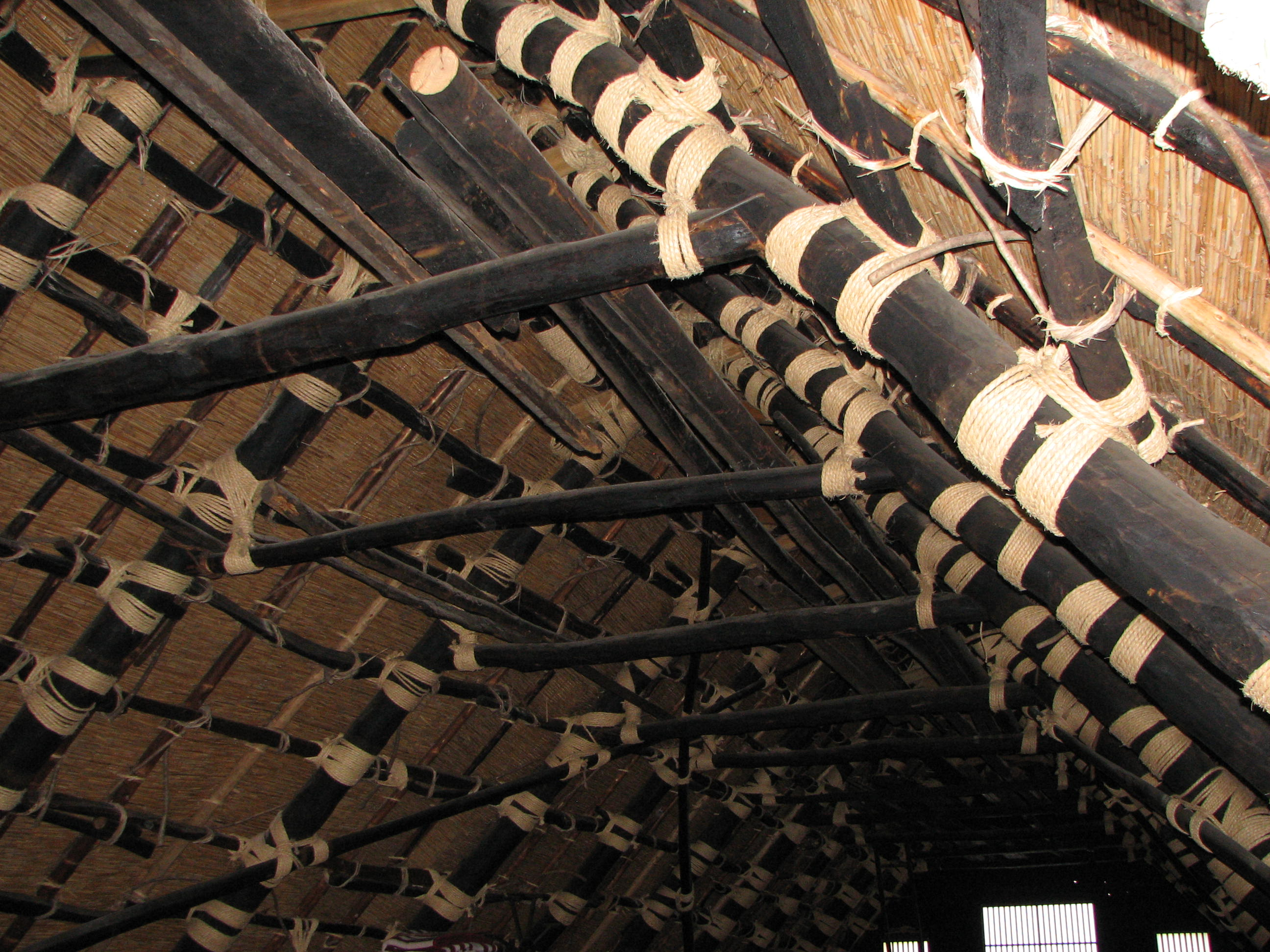
Gasshō-style roof

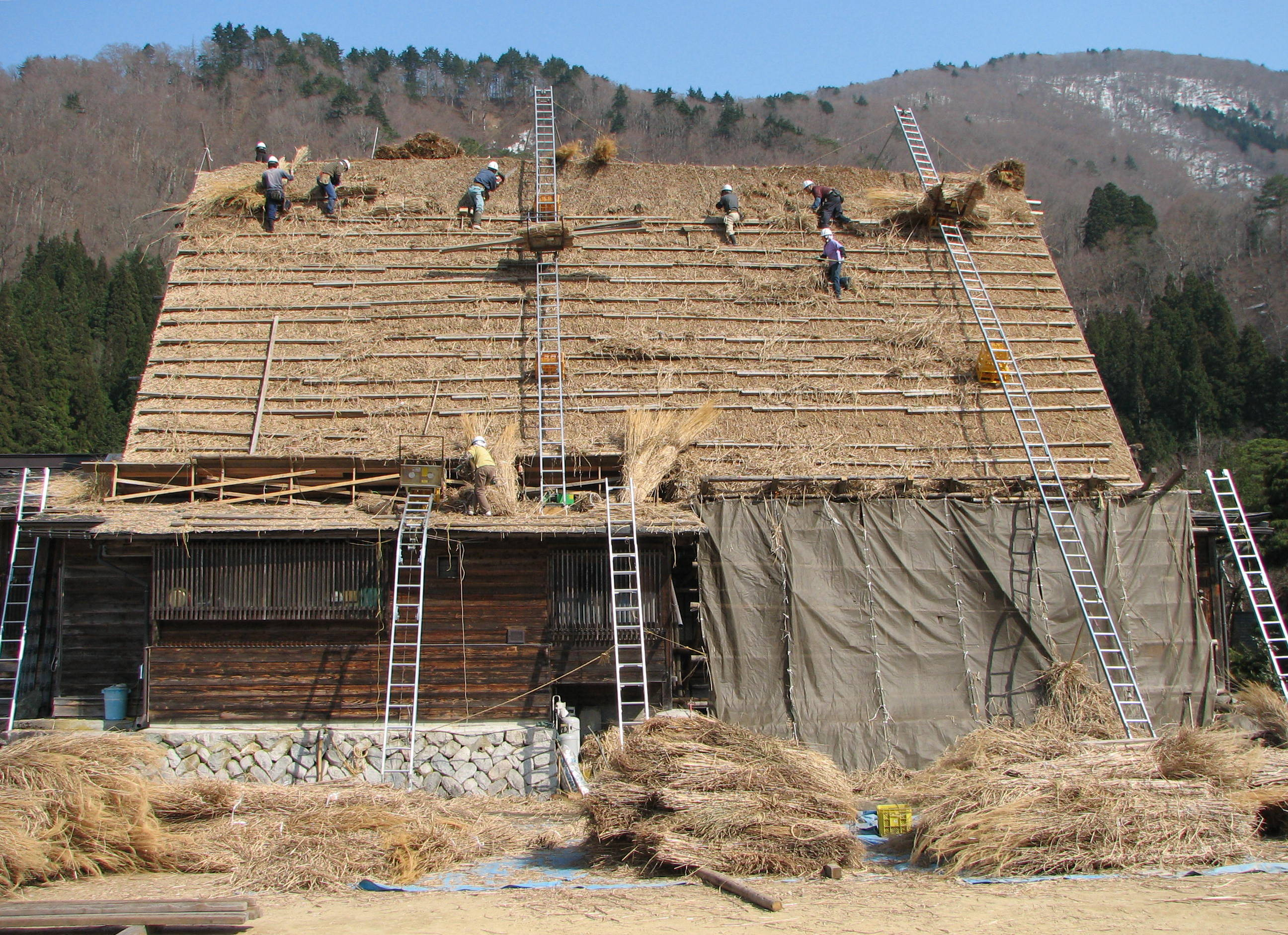
Gasshō-zukuri under repair

Looking around a preserved old minka in Tokyo

Minka come in a wide range of styles and sizes, largely as a result of differing geographic and climatic conditions as well as the lifestyle of the inhabitants. They generally fall into one of four classifications: farmhouses nōka (農家) town houses machiya (町屋), fishermen's dwellings gyoka (漁家) and mountain dwellings sanka (山家).

Unlike other forms of Japanese architecture (such as those of the sukiya (数寄屋) style), it is the structure rather than the plan that is of primary importance to the minka. Minka are divided up with primary posts that form the basic framework and bear the structural load of the building; secondary posts are arranged to suit the functional arrangements of the plan.

Despite the wide variety of minka, there are eight basic forms:

- The 'inverted U' consists of two vertical posts fixed at the top with a horizontal beam; these units can then be joined with side girders. The beam can be fixed to the top of the post either by resting upon it or via a mortise and tenon joint. This latter method is often found in minka on the island of Shikoku.
- The 'ladder' has post and beam units connected with larger beams including beams that are closer to the foundation level. This form of structure originated in townhouses of the Edo period. The system allows the irregular placement of posts and, therefore, allows flexibility in the plan.
- With the 'umbrella' style, four beams radiate out from a central post. These posts sit at the centre of the square rather than the corners. Minka of this type are often found in Shiga Prefecture.
- The 'cross' has two beams at right angles to one another with the posts in the centre of the sides. It is often used for very small minka that have no other posts erected in the space or for large minka in the earth-floored area. The style is most often found in Shiga and Fukui prefectures.
- 'Parallel crosses' are found in Shizuoka Prefecture and cover an area 5 metres by 10 metres. This system doubles up the 'cross' structure with two crosses and eight posts.
- The 'box' structure connects four or more post and beam units to create a box-like structure. It was devised in the Edo period and can be found in Toyama and Ishikawa prefectures.
- The 'interconnected box' can be found in Kyoto and Osaka.
- 'Rising beams' is a form that enables better use of the second storey. It uses beams that rise from the posts to a secondary ridge that is below the one formed by the rafters.
  - Thatched roof farmhouses based upon the 'rising beam' structure can be further classified into four major types. The yojiro-gumi and the wagoya (和小屋) are rare. The latter of these, the wagoya, is popular for machiya houses. Far more common are the sasu (扠首) (also known as gasshou (合掌)) and the odachi types.

The odachi style has rafters, crossbeams and short vertical posts to support the ridge. Historically, these posts would have extended to the ground resulting in a row of posts extending down the centre of the house and dividing it. Although these could be accommodated in the layout of the main house, they were impractical in the earth-floored entrance area—so they were omitted and a special beam structure used instead. This style was in wide use until the Edo period when a shift was made to the sasu style (although both types had been used since historic times).

The sasu style is a simpler triangular shape with a pair of rafters joined at the top to support the ridge pole. The ends of these rafters were sharpened to fit into mortice holes at either end of crossbeam. As this system does not rely on central posts it leaves a more unobstructed plan than the odachi style.

== Design of the floor plan ==
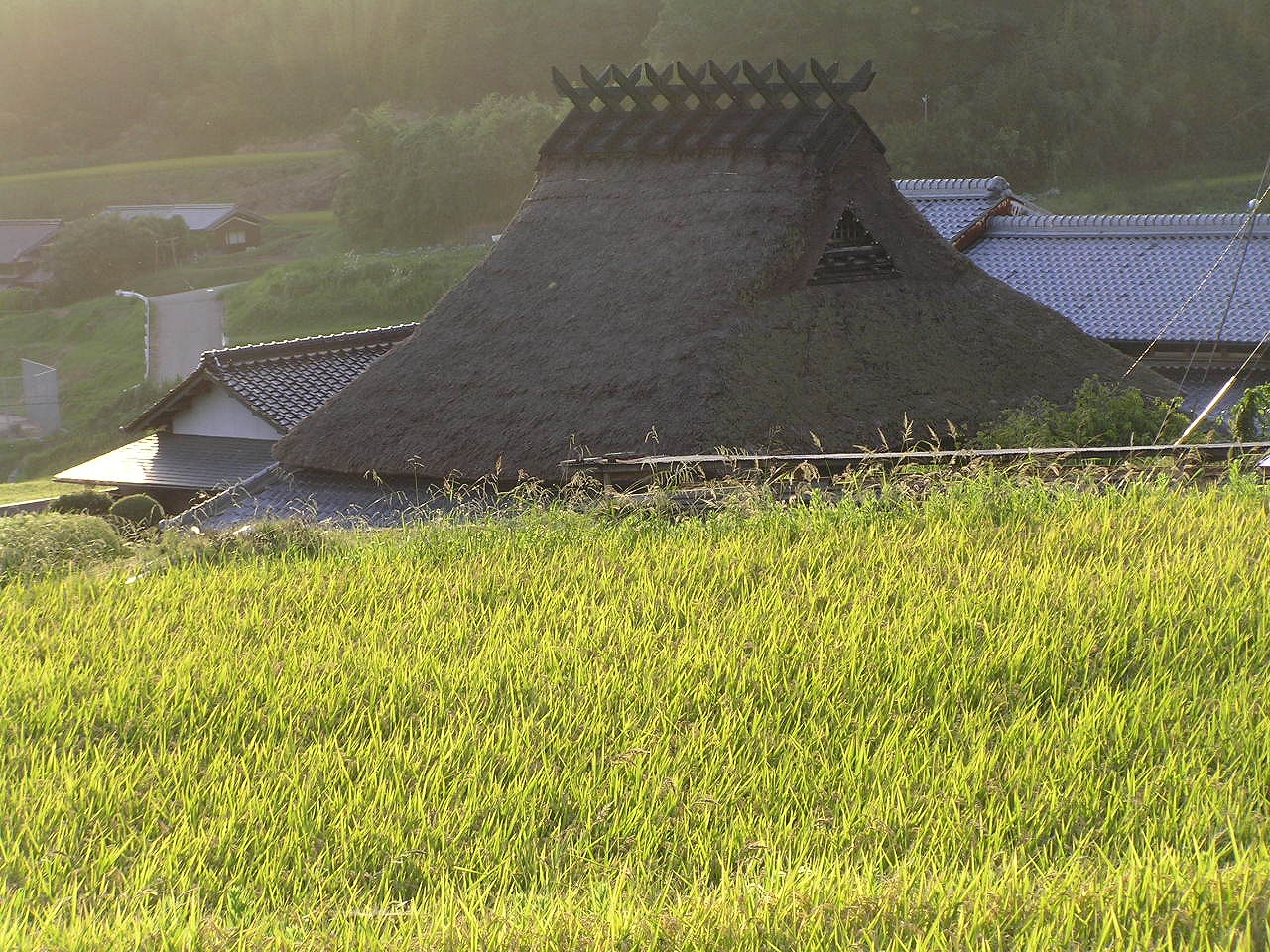
Decorative roof projections on the ridge of a thatched roof

There were two main methods for setting out the floor plan of the minka. The kyoma (京間) method uses a standard size of tatami (畳) mat, whereas the inakama (田舎間) method is based upon column spacing.

The kyoma method works well for minka without central columns as the mats and the sliding partitions (fusuma (襖) and shōji (障子)) can be based on a standard size. It was mainly used in minka in western Japan. The method has its disadvantages if used with posts because variations in post width can make the prefabrication of the sliding partitions difficult.

The inakama method is based upon the distance between centre of one post and centre of the post adjacent to it and it was mainly used on the eastern side of Japan.

== Overall construction ==
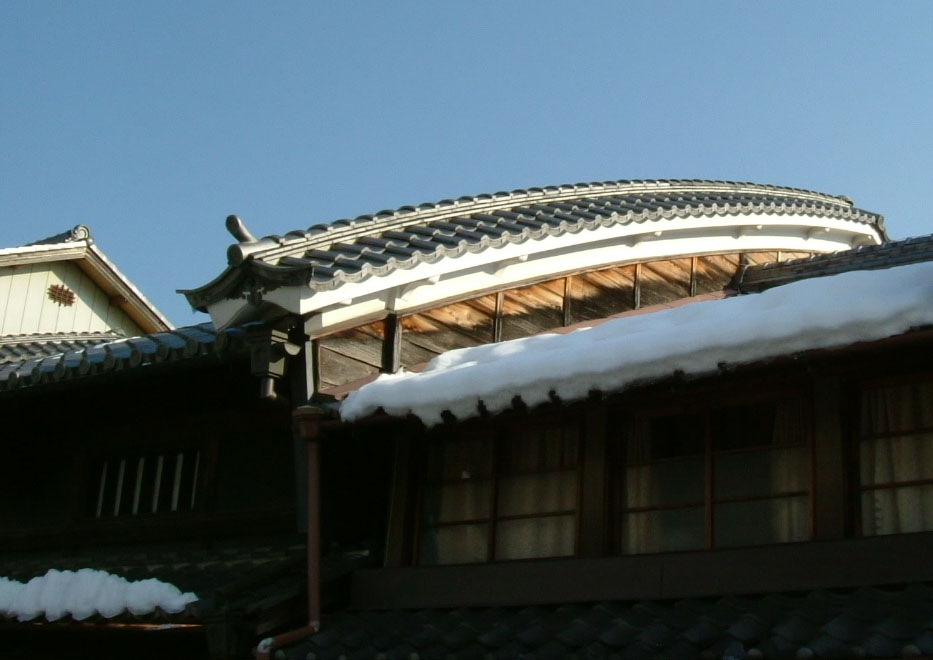
Tiled udatsu projecting above the roof

The size, construction and decoration of a minka was dependent upon its location, climate, and social status of its owner.

Minka were influenced by local building techniques and were built with materials that were abundant in the immediate locality. For example, minka in Shizuoka used abundant bamboo for roofs, eaves, doors and floors. When miscanthus reeds were difficult to obtain for thatched roofs, shingles were used instead; in volcanic areas rushes or boards were used instead of clay for the walls.

Climate had a bearing on construction: In Kyoto in the late Heian and Muromachi periods, roofs were clad in thin wooden shingles so owners would put stones on top to prevent the shingles from flying away in the wind.

The social status of the minka owner was indicated by the size and complexity of the building. For thatched roof minka the number of crossed wooden members (umanori (馬乗り)) or bundles of miscanthus reeds along the ridge are a good indicator of the importance of the owner's status in the village. For machiya, the presence and elaborateness of an udatsu (卯立)—a wall that projects above the roof line—has a similar status. The udatsu inherited the function of a fire break, but initially it was a method of establishing the extent of ownership in long terraces of row houses.

During the evolution of minka, the machiya townhouses gradually changed its construction away from perishable and flammable materials to those of a more durable nature. Thatched roofs were replaced with tiles and exposed timbers were covered up with layers of clay plastering.

Minka owned by people of a higher social status began to incorporate elements of the shoin style, particularly in living rooms. The types of elements incorporated were limited by sumptuary laws to preserve strict class distinctions.

== Roofing ==
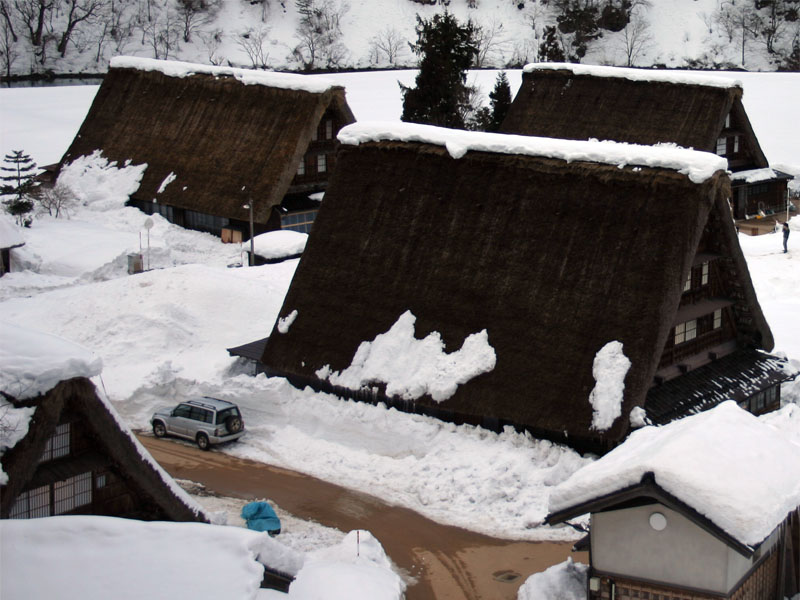
Gasshō-zukuri minka homes in Gokayama surrounded by snow

There are four types of roof shape that can be differentiated for minka. Most machiya have gabled kirizuma (切妻) roofs, covered in shingles or tiles, and slanting down on either side of the house. The majority of nōka have either thatched yosemune (寄せ棟)-style hipped roofs, which slant down on four sides, or the more elaborate irimoya (入母屋) roof with multiple gables and a combination of thatched sections and shingled sections. Finally, the hogyo (方形) also slopes in four directions but is more pyramidal in shape.

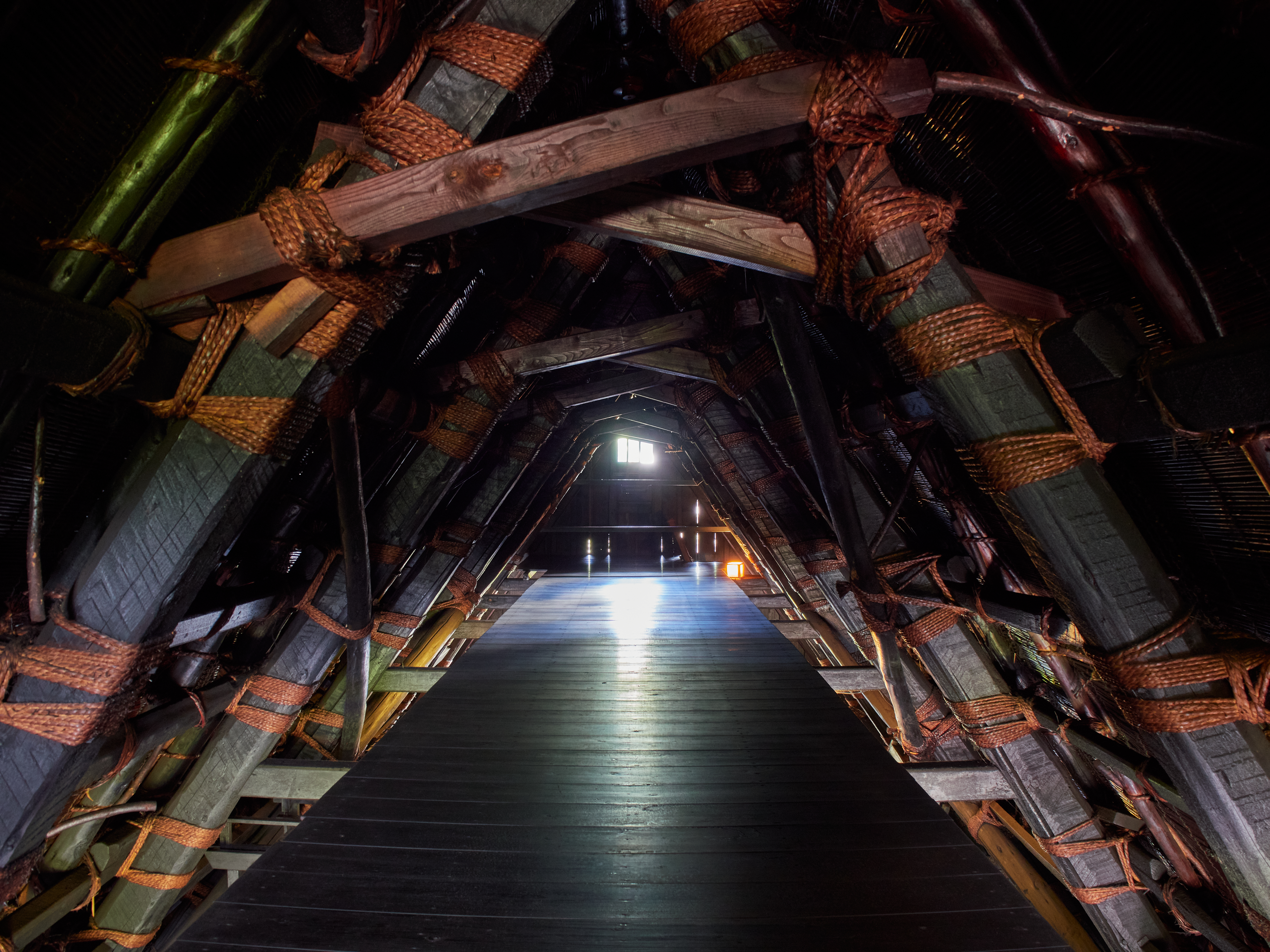
Interior of a traditional gassho-zukuri farmhouse, showing the steep thatched roof framework bound with rope

The primary purpose of shaping minka roofs was to accommodate the extensive precipitation experienced in many parts of Japan. A steeply peaked roof allows rain and snow to fall straight off, preventing water from getting through the roof into the home and, to a lesser extent, preventing the thatch from getting too wet and beginning to rot.

At the peak and other places where roof sections came together decorations were added. Thatched roofs would have trimmed or transverse layers of straw, bamboo poles or planks of wood. Tiled roofs have a variety of decorative plates to the ends of the ridge, for example, shachi (鯱) (fish). They also had circular plates to the ends of the tiles at the eaves called gatou (瓦当) that helped to deflect rain.

== Farmhouse interior ==
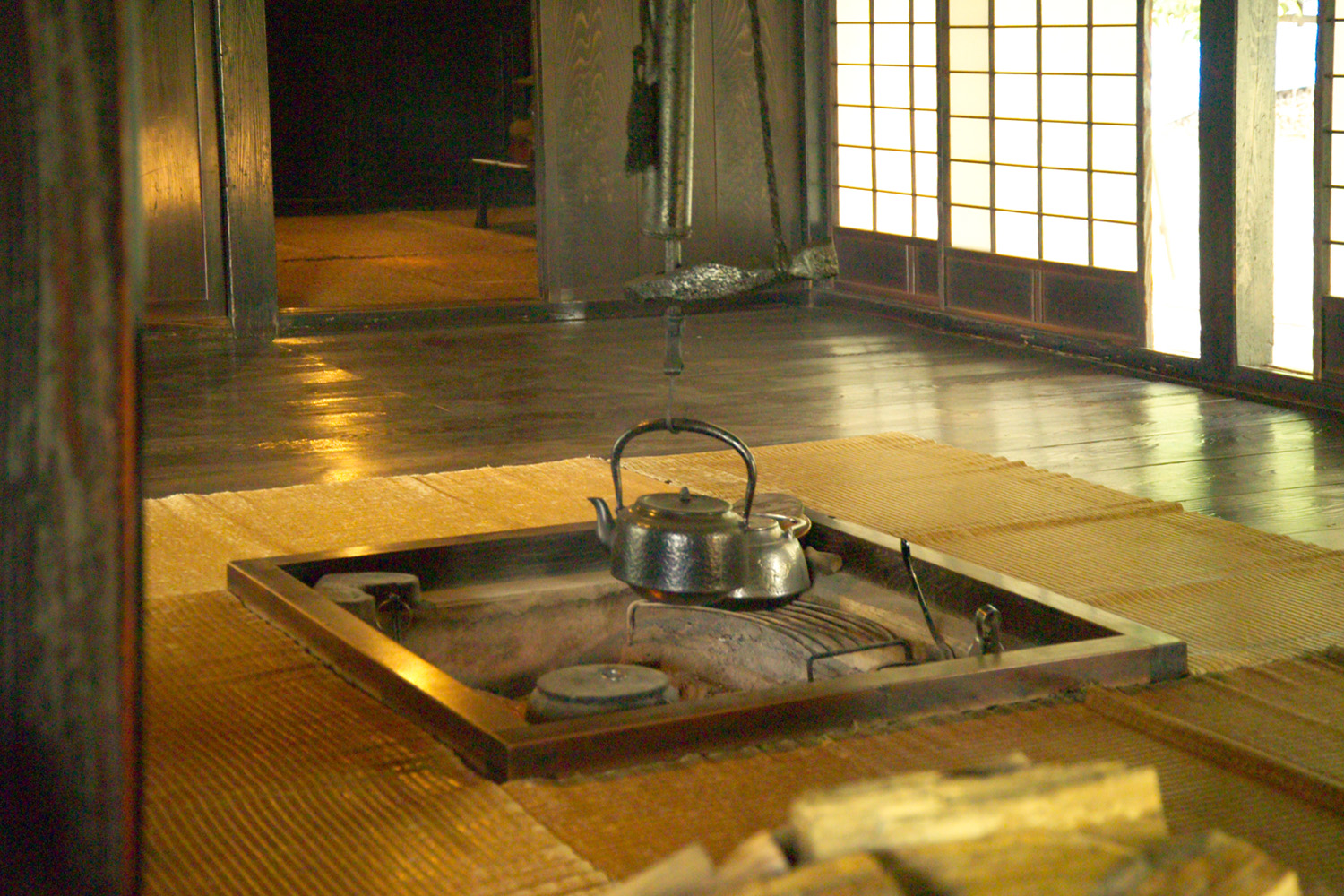
Irori (囲炉裏)

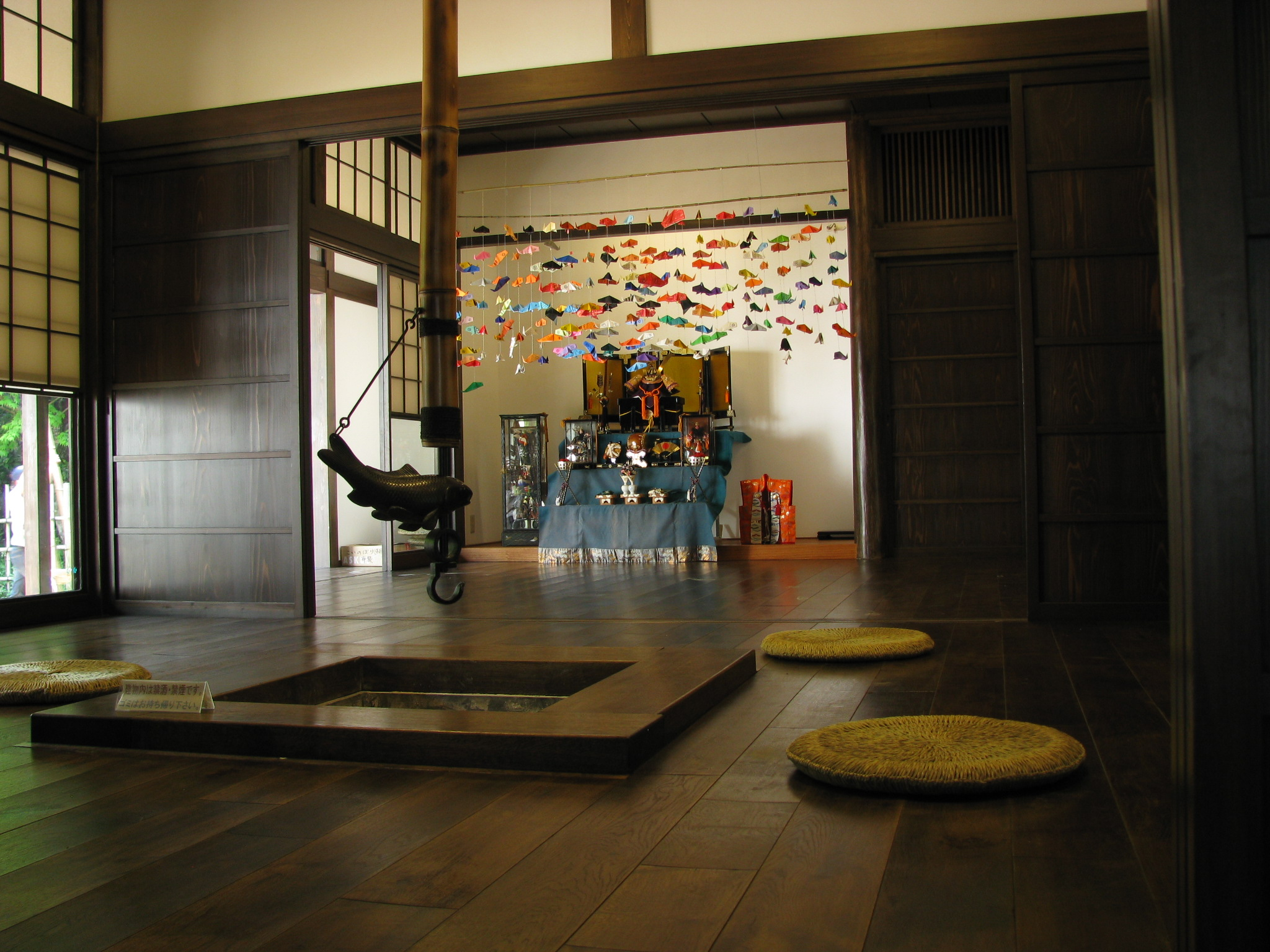
A jizai kagi hearth hook with fish-shaped counterbalance

The deep eaves of the farmhouse roof helped to protect the interior from driving rain. They stop the sun from entering the interior during the summer, and they allow the low rays of sun to warm the house during the winter. Often there is a timber-floored veranda (engawa (縁側 or 掾側)) around the house under the eaves and protected on the outside by storm shutters. In areas where there is heavy snow there may be a lowered earth-floored area outside the veranda further protected by shutters which helps to stop snow from blowing inside.

The interior of a minka was generally divided into two sections: a floor of compacted earth, called a doma (土間) (the precursor to a genkan) and a raised floor (generally around 20 inches (50 cm) above the level of the doma), called a hiroma (広間), and, in larger, richer houses, an area or set of rooms covered in tatami or mushiro mats, called a zashiki (座敷). Large farmhouses sometimes had a raised, timber-floored internal veranda (hiroshiki (広敷)) that separated the doma and the tatami areas. In older houses, like the 17th century Yoshimura house, this separating zone was up to 2.5 m (8 ft 2 in) wide and servants apparently slept there.

The raised floor often included a built-in hearth, called an irori (囲炉裏). Above the ash-filled hearth would hang a kettle suspended from the ceiling by an adjustable hearth hook made of wood, metal and bamboo. This jizai kagi (自在鈎) could be raised or lowered depending on the amount of heat required and was often shaped into decorative fish or blade shapes. There was no chimney in the farmhouse and the smoke from the irori would rise through the roof drying the reeds and deterring insects. The irori was the centre of communication for the house where the family gathered to chat and eat, and it was a cozy place around which to sleep.

Though there were many possible arrangements of the rooms in a home, one of the most common, called yomadori (四間取り), comprised four rooms in the raised floor portion of the house, adjacent to the doma. The arrangement and size of these rooms was made more flexible with the use of sliding fusuma and shōji partitions.

The social status of the owner of house governed the conventions of their social relationships in the house. For example, the lowliest ranked people would sit on the earth floor whilst those above them would sit on the hiroshiki and those above them on the tatami floored inner rooms. Honoured guests would sit next with their back to the tokonoma (床の間). The requirements for social etiquette extended to the family and there were particular seating positions (yokoza (横座)) positioned around the hearth.

== Typical Edo period farmhouses ==
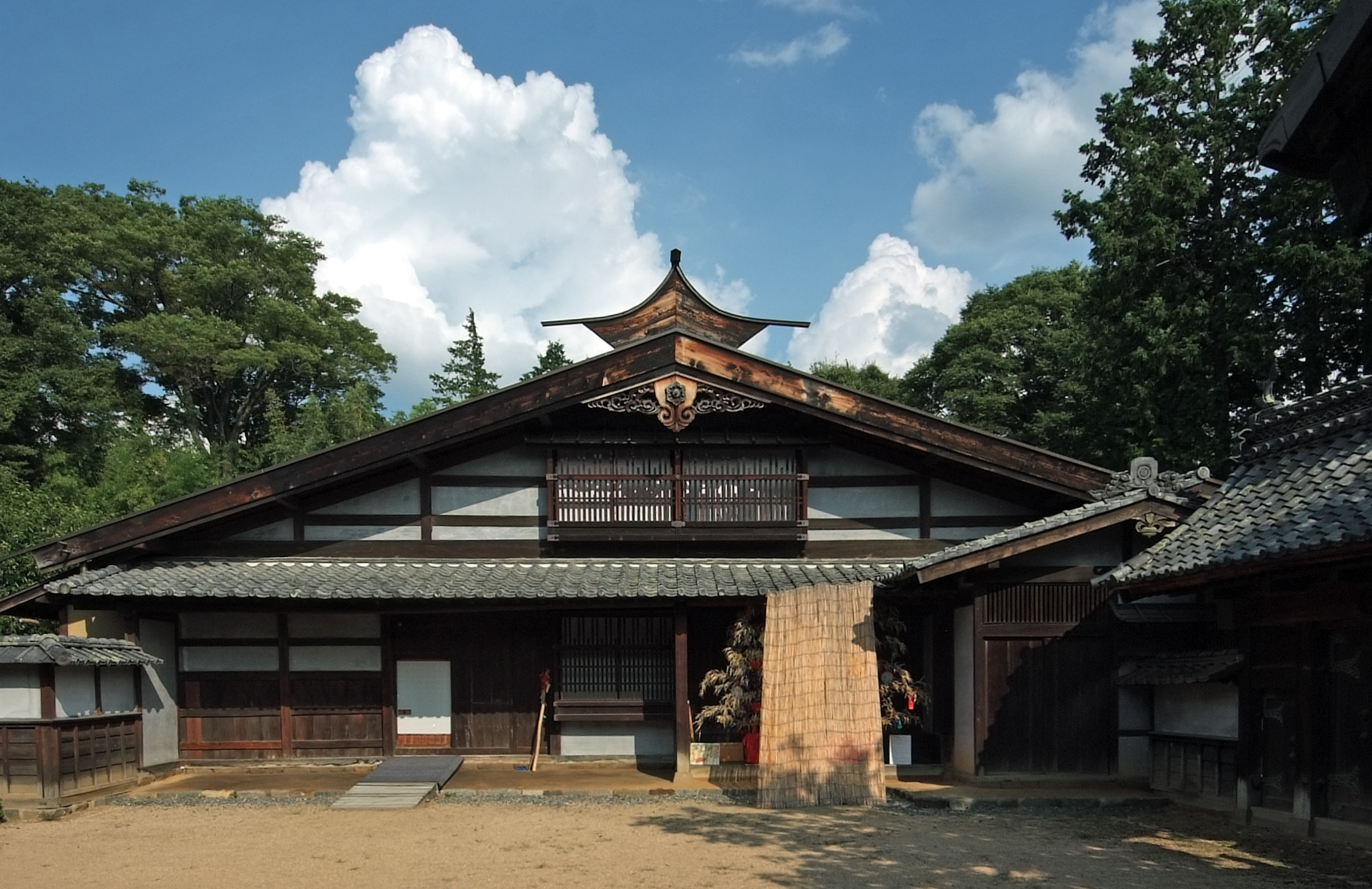
Honmune-style house with birdlike decoration on the gable

A number of styles of farmhouses came to maturity during the Edo period; some typical examples follow.

=== Gasshou ===
The gasshō-zukuri (合掌造)-style minka have vast roofs that are a large form of the sasu structural system. Their name derives from the similarity of the roof shape to two hands in prayer. They are frequently found in Gifu Prefecture. The upper floors of the two- and three-story houses are used for sericulture, with storage space for trays of silkworms and mulberry leaves.

=== Honmune ===
Honmune-zukuri (本棟造) literally means "true ridge": The style has a nearly square plan with a gabled roof that is board covered. The gable end of the house is particularly impressive with its composition of beams, eaves and braces. The gable is topped by a birdlike ornament called a suzume-odori (雀踊り). Houses of this type can be found in Gunma, Nara, Yamaguchi and Kouchi prefectures.

== Preservation ==
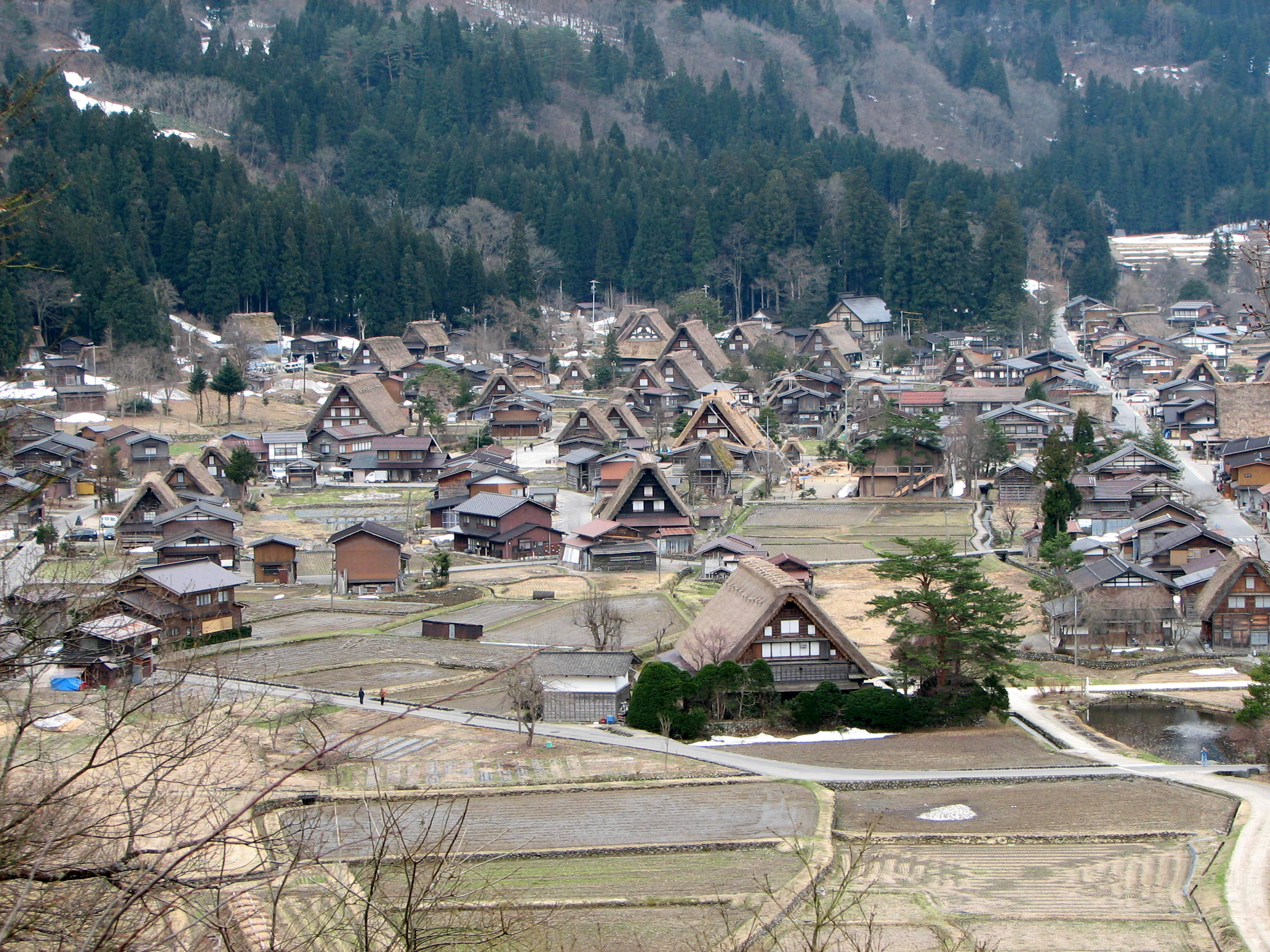
Gasshō-zukuri, Ogimachi village

Minka are generally treated as historic landmarks, and many have been designated for preservation by municipalities or the national government. The tremendous regional variation of minka has also been preserved in open-air museums such as Nihon Minka-en in Kawasaki, where examples from around Japan are on display. Minka have also been used as hotels and restaurants to be preserved.

Of particular note is the gasshō-zukuri (合掌造り; lit. '"clasped-hands" style'), which is preserved in two villages in central Japan—Shirakawa in Gifu Prefecture and Gokayama in Toyama Prefecture—that together have been designated a World Heritage Site by UNESCO.

In 1997, the Japan Minka Reuse and Recycle Association (JMRA) was established to promote the benefits and conservation of minka. One minka that belonged to the Yonezu family was acquired by the JMRA and donated to Kew Gardens as part of the Japan 2001 Festival. The wooden structure was dismantled, shipped and re-assembled in Kew with new walls and a thatched roof.

== See also ==
- Historic Villages of Shirakawa-gō and Gokayama
- Nihon Minka-en
- A-frame building
- Machiya, traditional Japanese townhouses
- Kura
