= Oshirakawa Dam =

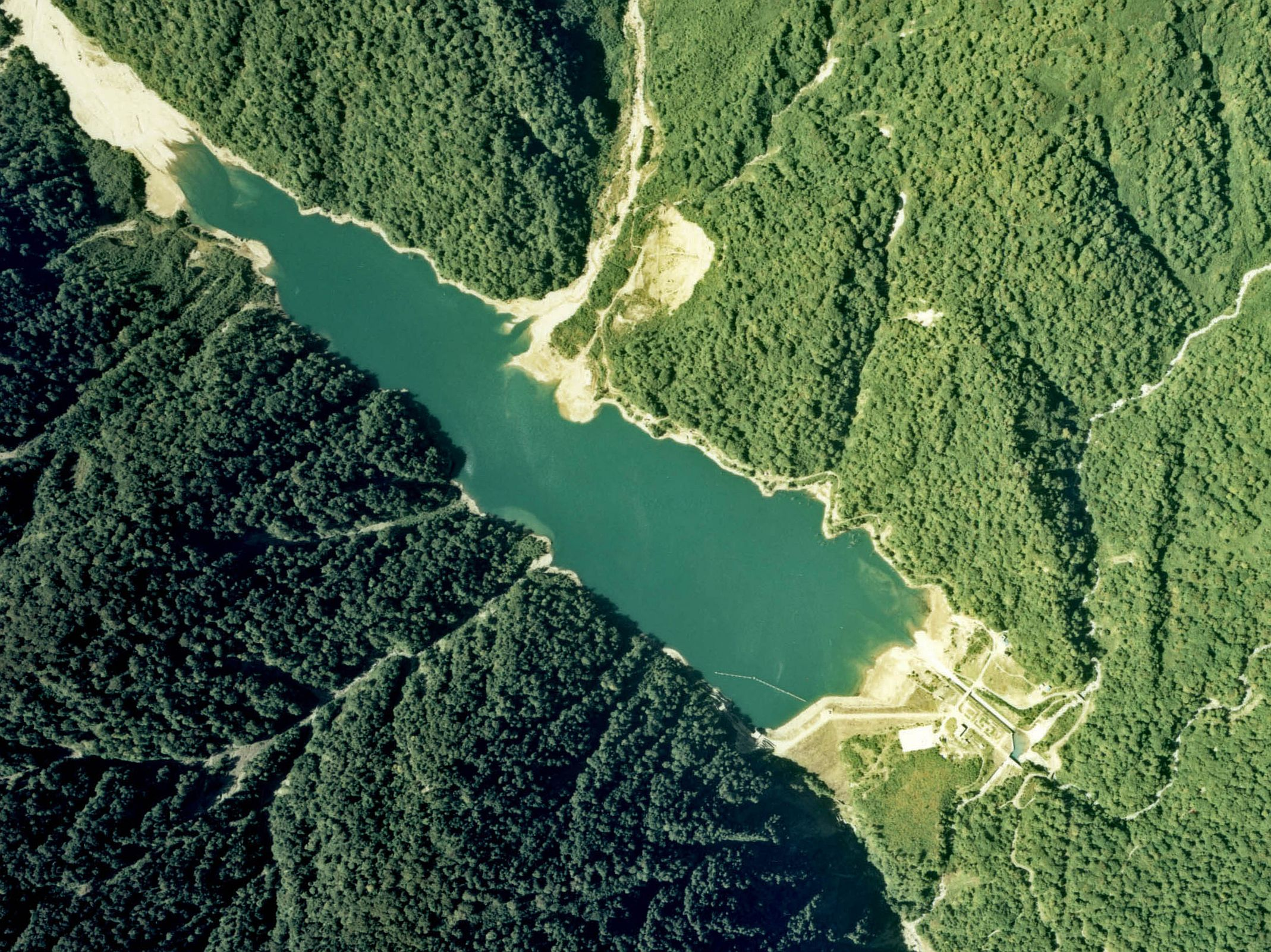
- Overhead of the dam and reservoir in 1977

- Location within Japan
- Country: Japan
- Location: Shirakawa, Gifu Prefecture
- Coordinates: 36°08′26.73″N 136°49′19.24″E
- Purpose: Power
- Status: Operational
- Construction began: 1961
- Opening date: 1963

Dam and spillways
- Type of dam: Embankment, rock-fill
- Impounds: Oshirakawa River
- Height: 95 m (312 ft)
- Length: 390 m (1,280 ft)
- Elevation at crest: 1,235 m (4,052 ft)
- Dam volume: 1,700,000 m^{3} (2,200,000 cu yd)
- Spillway type: Crest overflow, 1 tainter gate

Reservoir
- Total capacity: 14,200,000 m^{3} (11,500 acre⋅ft)
- Active capacity: 11×10^{6} m^{3} (8,900 acre⋅ft)
- Catchment area: 44.7 km^{2} (17.3 mi^{2})
- Surface area: .665 km^{2} (0.257 mi^{2})
- Normal elevation: 1,230 m (4,040 ft)

Power Station
- Operators: Kansai Electric Power Co., Inc.
- Commission date: 19 December 1963
- Hydraulic head: 476.9 m (1,565 ft)
- Turbines: 1 x 66.3 MW Francis-type
- Installed capacity: 66.3 MW

The Oshirakawa Dam is a rock-fill dam on the Oshirakawa River (a tributary of the Shō River) about 16 km (9.9 mi) southwest of Shirakawa in Gifu Prefecture, Japan. It was constructed between 1961 and 1963. The dam has an associated 66.3 MW hydroelectric power station located about 7.1 km (4.4 mi) downstream which was commissioned in 1963.

== See also ==
- Hatogaya Dam – downstream on the Shō River
