= Toga Dam =

- Location within Japan
- Country: Japan
- Location: Omaki, Toyama Prefecture
- Coordinates: 36°28′28.49″N 137°01′21.04″E
- Purpose: Power
- Status: Operational
- Construction began: 1941
- Opening date: 1943

Dam and spillways
- Type of dam: Gravity
- Impounds: Togagawa River
- Height: 31 m (102 ft)
- Length: 70 m (230 ft)
- Dam volume: 21,000 m^{3} (27,000 cu yd)
- Spillway type: Crest overflow, two tainter gates

Reservoir
- Total capacity: 1,113,000 m^{3} (902 acre⋅ft)
- Active capacity: 923,000 m^{3} (748 acre⋅ft)
- Catchment area: 92.3 km^{2} (35.6 mi^{2})
- Surface area: 140 m^{2} (0.035 acres)
- Normal elevation: 391 m (1,283 ft)

Omaki Power Station
- Coordinates: 36°28′34″N 136°58′54″E
- Operators: Kansai Electric Power Co., Inc.
- Commission date: 18 May 1944
- Hydraulic head: 194.23 m (637.2 ft)
- Turbines: 2 x 8.8 MW Francis-type
- Installed capacity: 17.6 MW

The Toga Dam is a gravity dam on the Togagawa River (a tributary of the Shō River) near Omaki village about 11 km (6.8 mi) southeast of Shogawa in Toyama Prefecture, Japan. It was constructed between 1941 and 1943. The dam diverts water to the 17.6 MW Omaki hydroelectric power station 4.3 km (2.7 mi) to the west on the Shō River. It was commissioned in 1944.

== See also ==
- Komaki Dam – downstream on the Shō River
- Senzoku Dam – upstream
