= Komaki Dam =

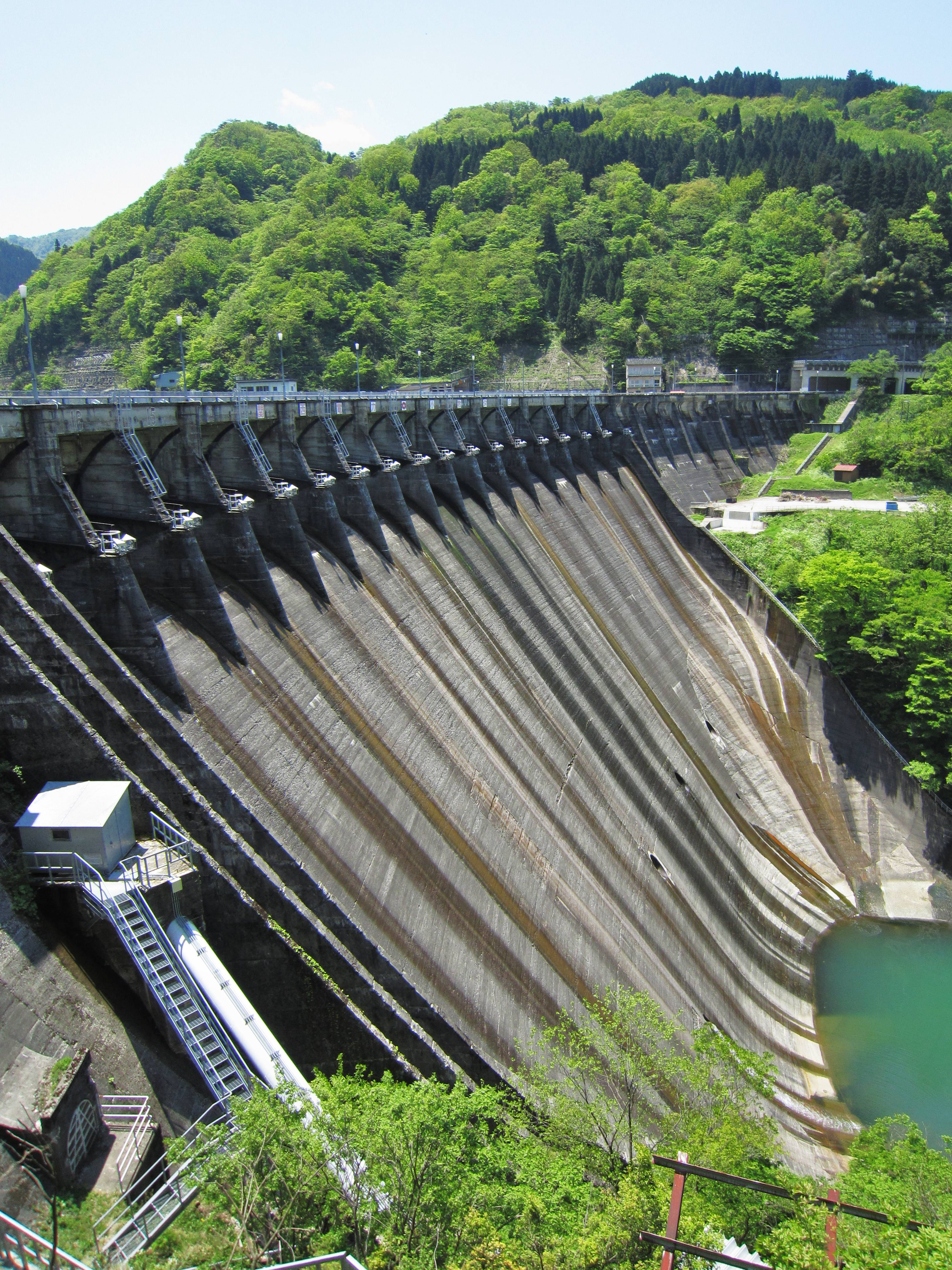
- Downstream face

- Location within Japan
- Country: Japan
- Location: Shogawa, Toyama Prefecture
- Coordinates: 36°33′24″N 137°0′30″E
- Purpose: Power
- Status: Operational
- Construction began: 1925
- Opening date: 1930

Dam and spillways
- Type of dam: Arch gravity
- Impounds: Shō River
- Height: 79.2 m (260 ft)
- Length: 300.8 m (987 ft)
- Dam volume: 289,000 m^{3} (378,000 cu yd)
- Spillway type: Crest overflow, 17 tainter gates

Reservoir
- Total capacity: 37,957,000 m^{3} (30,772 acre⋅ft)
- Active capacity: 18,858,000 m^{3} (15,288 acre⋅ft)
- Catchment area: 1,100 km^{2} (420 mi^{2})
- Surface area: 145 ha (360 acres)

Power Station
- Operators: Kansai Electric Power Co., Inc.
- Commission date: 5 November 1930
- Hydraulic head: 68.46 m (224.6 ft)
- Turbines: 4 x 22.55 MW Francis-type
- Installed capacity: 90.2 MW

The Komaki Dam is an arch-gravity dam on the Shō River about 2.5 km (1.6 mi) southeast of Shogawa in Toyama Prefecture, Japan. It was constructed between 1925 and 1930. The dam has an associated 90.2 MW hydroelectric power station which was commissioned in 1930. Of the nine dams on the Shō River, it is the second-furthest downstream.

== See also ==
- Shogawa Goguchi Dam – downstream
- Soyama Dam – upstream
