= Senzoku Dam (Toyama) =

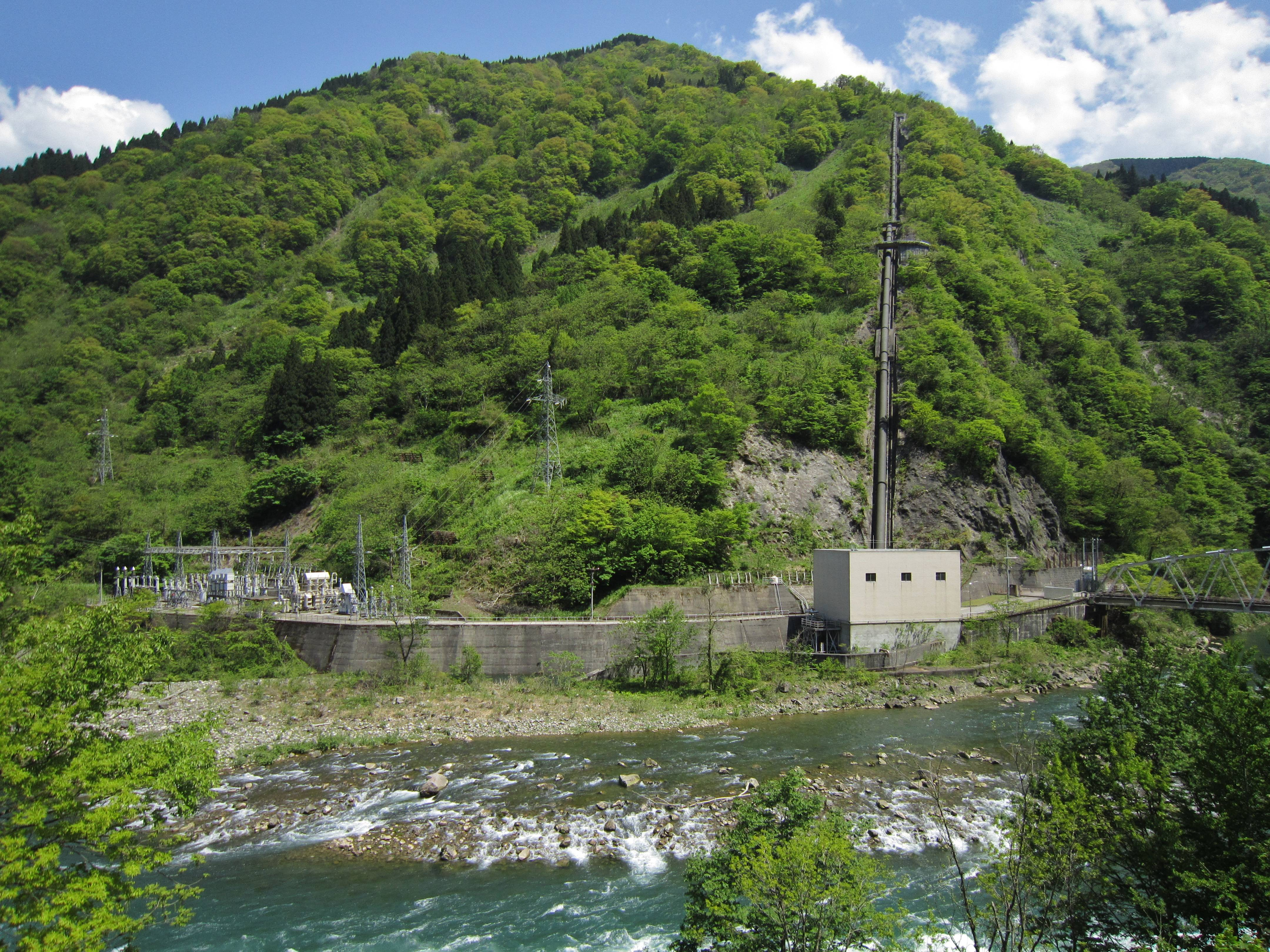
- Togagawa II Power Station on the Shō River

- Location within Japan
- Country: Japan
- Location: Toyama Prefecture
- Coordinates: 36°23′10.36″N 136°59′26.43″E
- Purpose: Power
- Status: Operational
- Opening date: 1974

Dam and spillways
- Type of dam: Gravity
- Impounds: Togagawa River
- Height: 33.5 m (110 ft)
- Length: 143 m (469 ft)
- Dam volume: 8,000 m^{3} (10,000 cu yd)
- Spillway type: Crest overflow, one tainter gate

Reservoir
- Total capacity: 132,000 m^{3} (107 acre⋅ft)
- Active capacity: 132,000 m^{3} (107 acre⋅ft)
- Catchment area: 66.2 km^{2} (25.6 mi^{2})
- Normal elevation: 614 m (2,014 ft)

Togagawa II Power Station
- Coordinates: 36°25′16″N 136°56′16″E
- Operators: Kansai Electric Power Co., Inc.
- Commission date: 8 December 1973
- Hydraulic head: 338.73 m (1,111.3 ft)
- Turbines: 1 x 32.7 MW Francis-type
- Installed capacity: 32.7 MW

The Senzoku Dam is a gravity dam on the Togagawa River (a tributary of the Shō River) about 20 km (12 mi) south of Shogawa in Toyama Prefecture, Japan. It was completed in 1974. The dam sends water to the 32.7 MW Togagawa II hydroelectric power station 5.7 km (3.5 mi) to the west on the Shō River. It was commissioned in 1973.

== See also ==
- Toga Dam – downstream
- Togagawa Dam – upstream
