= Tsubawara Dam =

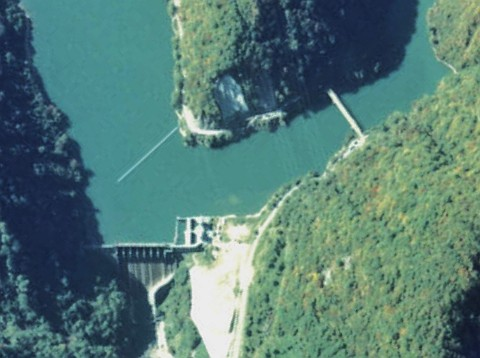
- Overview of the dam in 1977

- Location within Japan
- Country: Japan
- Location: Shirakawa, Gifu Prefecture
- Coordinates: 36°18′45″N 136°53′51″E
- Purpose: Power
- Status: Operational
- Construction began: 1952
- Opening date: 1953

Dam and spillways
- Type of dam: Gravity
- Impounds: Shō River
- Height: 68.2 m (224 ft)
- Length: 201.7 m (662 ft)
- Dam volume: 163,000 m^{3} (213,000 cu yd)
- Spillway type: Crest overflow, 7 tainter gates

Reservoir
- Total capacity: 22,274,000 m^{3} (18,058 acre⋅ft)
- Active capacity: 5,788,000 m^{3} (4,692 acre⋅ft)
- Catchment area: 665.7 km^{2} (257.0 mi^{2})
- Surface area: 1.16 km^{2} (0.45 mi^{2})
- Normal elevation: 460.5 m (1,511 ft)

Power Station
- Operators: Kansai Electric Power Co., Inc.
- Commission date: Original: 8 January 1954; New: 27 March 1975
- Hydraulic head: Original: 65.30 m (214.2 ft); New: 62 m (203 ft)
- Turbines: Original: 1 x 42 MW Francis-type; New: 1 x 65 MW Francis-type
- Installed capacity: 107 MW

The Tsubawara Dam, also known as the Tsubakihara Dam, is a gravity dam on the Shō River about 5 km (3.1 mi) north of Shirakawa in Gifu Prefecture, Japan. It was constructed between 1952 and 1953. The dam has an associated 107 MW hydroelectric power station which was built in two parts. The first part of the power station (42 MW) was commissioned in 1954 and the second part of the power station (65 MW) was commissioned in 1975. Of the nine dams on the Shō River it is the seventh furthest downstream.

== See also ==
- Narude Dam – downstream
- Hatogaya Dam – upstream
