= Hatogaya Dam =

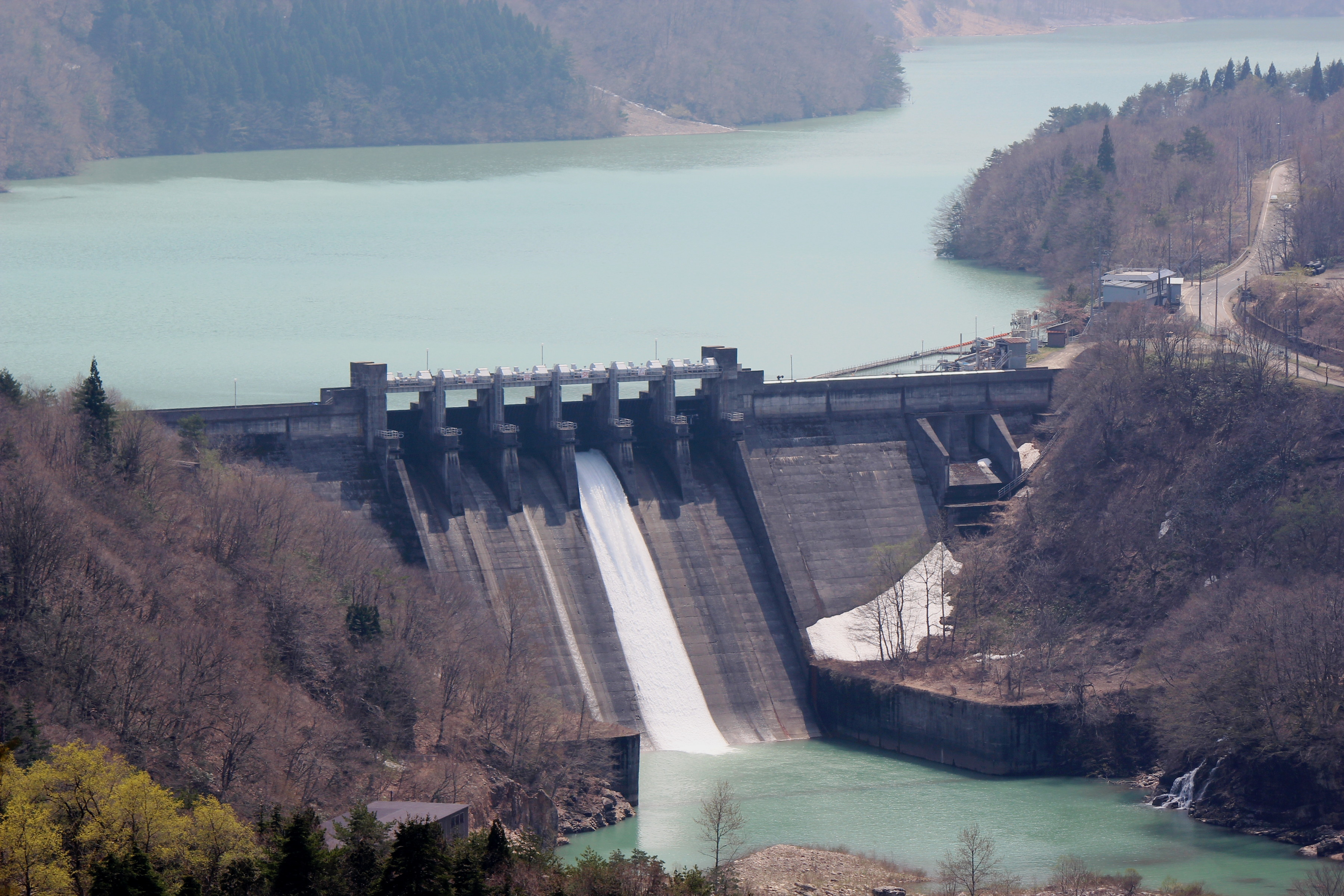
- Downstream side

- Location within Japan
- Country: Japan
- Location: Shirakawa, Gifu Prefecture
- Coordinates: 36°14′54″N 136°53′36″E
- Purpose: Power
- Status: Operational
- Construction began: 1954
- Opening date: 1956

Dam and spillways
- Type of dam: Gravity
- Impounds: Shō River
- Height: 63.2 m (207 ft)
- Length: 331.5 m (1,088 ft)
- Dam volume: 206,000 m^{3} (269,000 cu yd)
- Spillway type: Crest overflow, 6 tainter gates

Reservoir
- Total capacity: 33,539,000 m^{3} (27,191 acre⋅ft)
- Active capacity: 4,387,000 m^{3} (3,557 acre⋅ft)
- Catchment area: 580 km^{2} (220 mi^{2})
- Surface area: 1.51 km^{2} (0.58 mi^{2})
- Normal elevation: 550 m (1,800 ft)

Power Station
- Operators: Kansai Electric Power Co., Inc.
- Commission date: 24 November 1956
- Hydraulic head: 81.2 m (266 ft)
- Turbines: 1 x 43 MW Francis-type
- Installed capacity: 43 MW

The Hatogaya Dam is a gravity dam on the Shō River about 2 km (1.2 mi) south of Shirakawa in Gifu Prefecture, Japan. It was constructed between 1954 and 1956. The dam has an associated 43 MW hydroelectric power station which was commissioned in 1956. Of the nine dams on the Shō River it is the eighth furthest downstream.

== See also ==
- Tsubawara Dam – downstream
- Miboro Dam – upstream
