= Togagawa Dam =

Toga Dam
- Location within Japan
- Country: Japan
- Location: Taikanba, Toyama Prefecture
- Coordinates: 36°19′40.76″N 136°59′54.98″E
- Purpose: Power
- Status: Operational
- Opening date: June 1974

Dam and spillways
- Type of dam: Gravity
- Impounds: Togagawa River
- Height: 37 m (121 ft)
- Length: 142.5 m (468 ft)
- Elevation at crest: 897 m (2,943 ft)
- Dam volume: 43,455 m^{3} (56,837 cu yd)
- Spillway type: Crest overflow, one tainter gate

Reservoir
- Total capacity: 2,700,000 m^{3} (2,200 acre⋅ft)
- Active capacity: 1,350,000 m^{3} (1,090 acre⋅ft)
- Catchment area: 38 km^{2} (15 mi^{2})
- Surface area: 170 m^{2} (0.042 acres)
- Normal elevation: 891.8 m (2,926 ft)

Togagawa Power Station
- Coordinates: 36°22′45″N 136°59′21″E
- Operators: Kansai Electric Power Co., Inc.
- Commission date: 15 December 1973
- Hydraulic head: 260.07 m (853.2 ft)
- Turbines: 1 x 16.1 MW Francis-type
- Installed capacity: 16.1 MW

The Togagawa Dam is a gravity dam on the Togagawa River (a tributary of the Shō River) near Taikanba village about 26 km (16 mi) southeast of Shogawa in Toyama Prefecture, Japan. It was completed in June 1974. The dam has an associated 16.1 MW hydroelectric power station 5.8 km (3.6 mi) downstream near the Senzoku Dam reservoir. It was commissioned in December 1973.

== See also ==
- Senzoku Dam – downstream
