= Sakaigawa Dam =

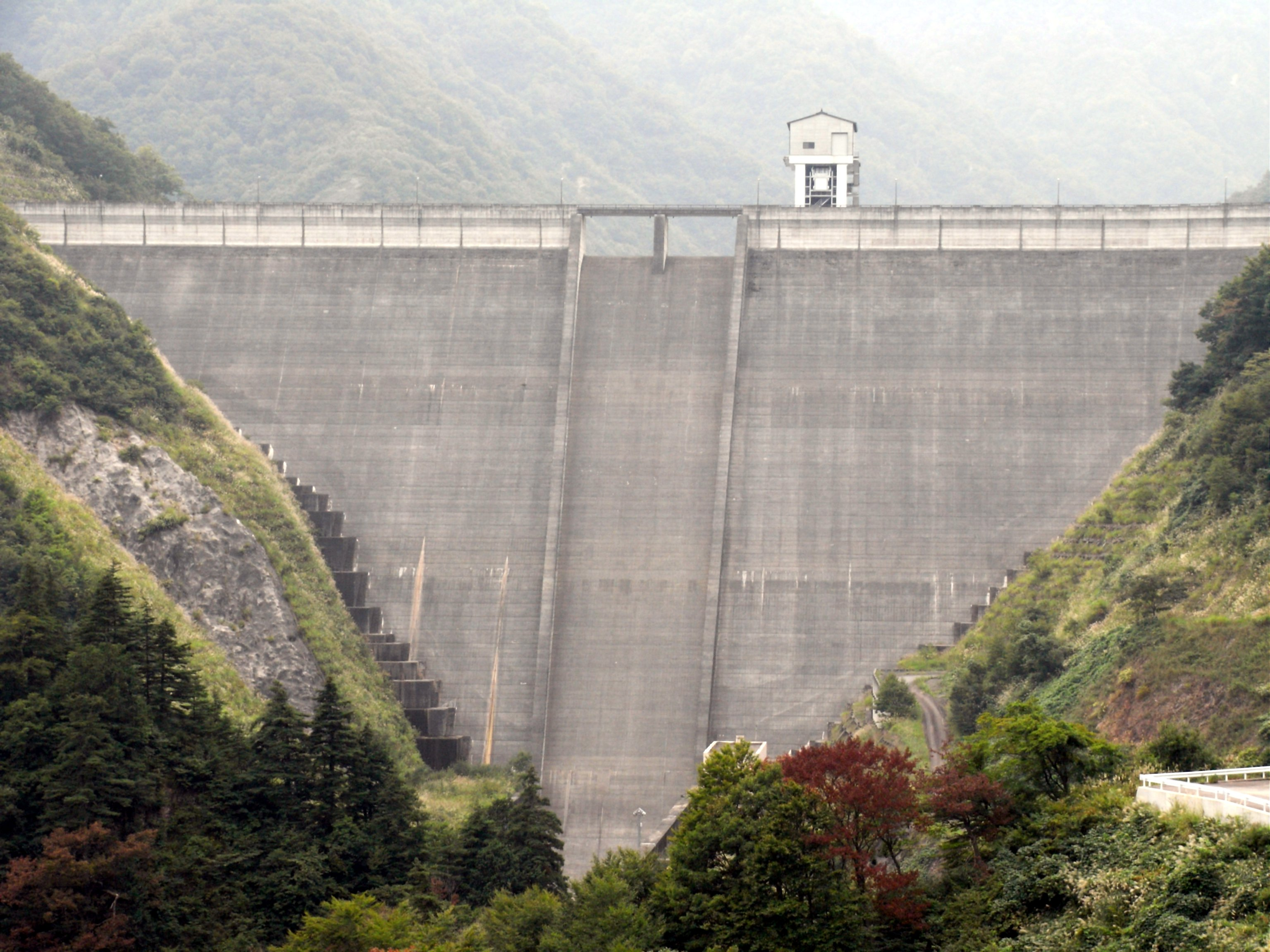
- Downstream face

- Location within Japan
- Country: Japan
- Location: nanto, Toyama Prefecture
- Coordinates: 36°20′56″N 136°50′23″E
- Purpose: Power
- Status: Operational
- Construction began: 1973
- Opening date: 1993

Dam and spillways
- Type of dam: Gravity
- Impounds: Shō River
- Height: 115 m (377 ft)
- Length: 297.5 m (976 ft)
- Dam volume: 713,000 m^{3} (933,000 cu yd)

Reservoir
- Total capacity: 59,900,000 m^{3} (48,600 acre⋅ft)
- Active capacity: 56,100,000 m^{3} (45,500 acre⋅ft)
- Catchment area: 37.7 km^{2} (14.6 mi^{2})
- Surface area: 1.60 km^{2} (0.62 mi^{2})
- Normal elevation: 567.6 m (1,862 ft)

Power Station
- Operators: Kansai Electric Power Co., Inc.
- Commission date: 2 June 1993
- Hydraulic head: 216.7 m (711 ft)
- Turbines: 1 x 27 MW Francis-type
- Installed capacity: 27 MW

Sakaigawa Dam (境川ダム, Sakaigawa damu) is a dam in Nanto, Toyama Prefecture and Shirakawa, Gifu Prefecture, Japan. It is named for the Sakaigawa River (a tributary of the Shō River), upon which it is built. The dam has an associated 27 MW hydroelectric power station about 2.9 km (1.8 mi) downstream. It was commissioned in June 1993.

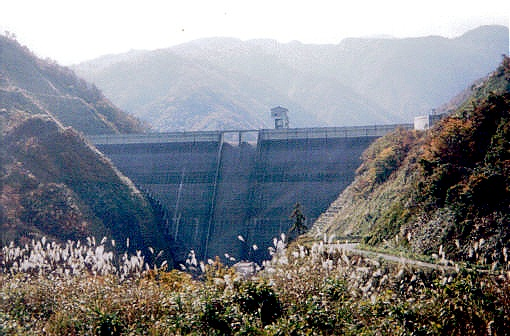
