= Okurodani Dam =

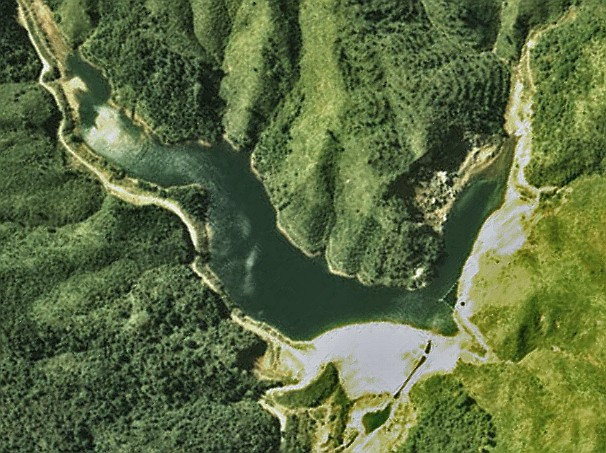
- Overhead of the dam and reservoir in 1977

- Location within Japan
- Country: Japan
- Location: Shōkawa, Gifu Prefecture
- Coordinates: 36°02′27.45″N 136°52′54.01″E
- Purpose: Power
- Status: Operational
- Construction began: 1969
- Opening date: 1971

Dam and spillways
- Type of dam: Embankment, rock-fill
- Impounds: Oshirakawa River
- Height: 34 m (112 ft)
- Length: 140 m (460 ft)
- Elevation at crest: 971 m (3,186 ft)
- Width (crest): 8 m (26 ft)
- Dam volume: 279,600 m^{3} (365,700 cu yd)
- Spillway type: Crest overflow, 1 tainter gate

Reservoir
- Total capacity: 765,000 m^{3} (620 acre⋅ft)
- Active capacity: 220,000 m^{3} (180 acre⋅ft)
- Catchment area: 64.6 km^{2} (24.9 mi^{2})
- Surface area: 87 m^{2} (0.021 acres)
- Normal elevation: 967 m (3,173 ft)

Power Station
- Operators: Kansai Electric Power Co., Inc.
- Commission date: 4 November 1971
- Hydraulic head: 210.8 m (692 ft)
- Turbines: 1 x 21.2 MW Francis-type
- Installed capacity: 21.2 MW

The Okurodani Dam is a rock-fill dam on the Oshirakawa River (a tributary of the Shō River) about 7 km (4.3 mi) west of Shōkawa in Gifu Prefecture, Japan. It was constructed between 1969 and 1971. The dam has an associated 21.2 MW hydroelectric power station located about 3.5 km (2.2 mi) downstream which was commissioned in 1971.

== See also ==
- Miboro Dam – downstream on the Shō River
