= Narude Dam =

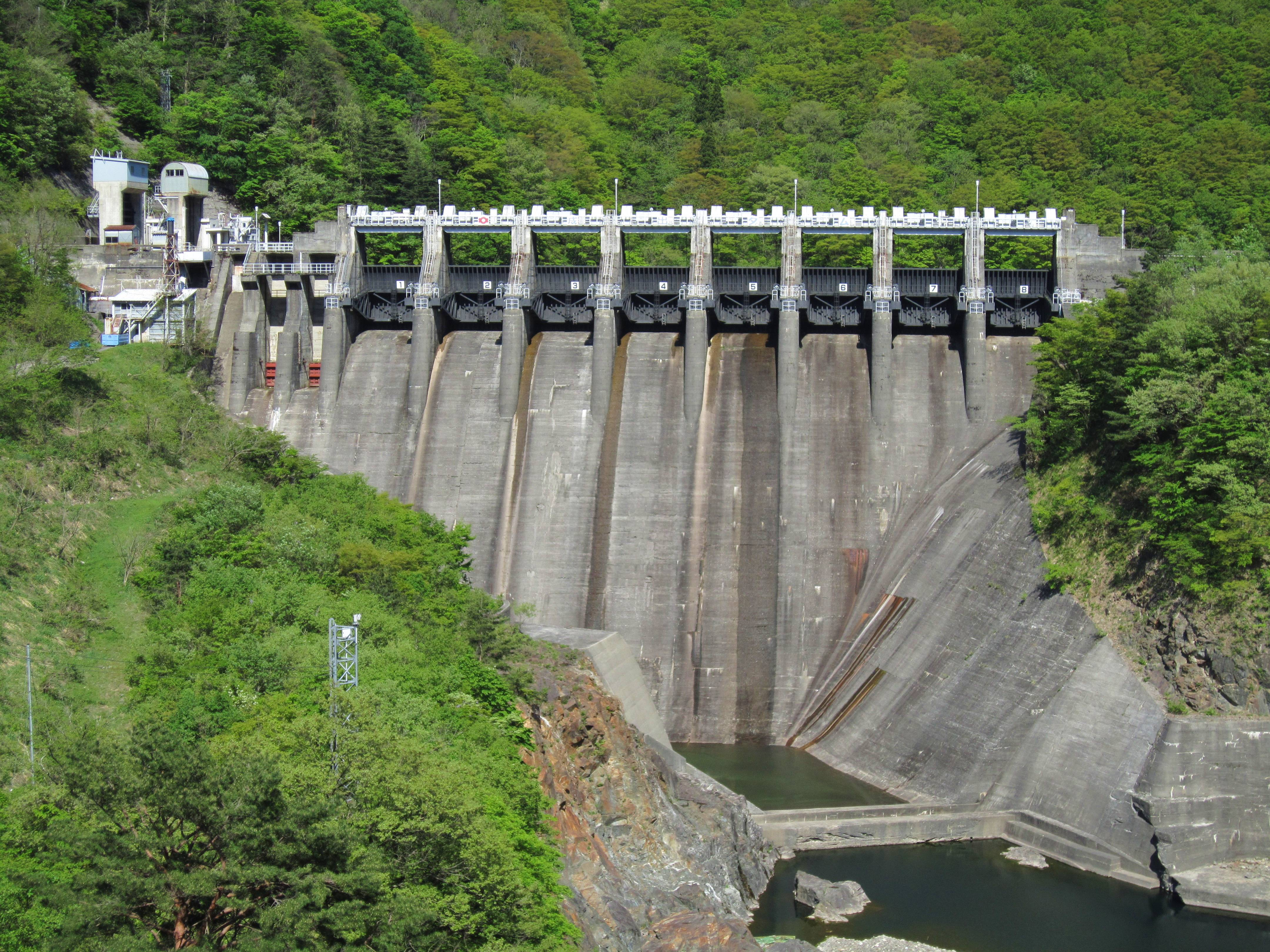
- Downstream face

- Location within Japan
- Country: Japan
- Location: Toyama/Gifu Prefecture
- Coordinates: 36°21′00.31″N 136°52′29.72″E
- Purpose: Power
- Status: Operational
- Construction began: 1950
- Opening date: 1952
- Owner: Kansai Electric Power Company

Dam and spillways
- Type of dam: Gravity
- Impounds: Shō River
- Height: 53.2 m (175 ft)
- Length: 190 m (620 ft)
- Dam volume: 103,000 m^{3} (135,000 cu yd)
- Spillway type: Crest overflow, 8 tainter gates

Reservoir
- Total capacity: 9,709,000 m^{3} (7,871 acre⋅ft)
- Active capacity: 3,186,000 m^{3} (2,583 acre⋅ft)
- Catchment area: 762.3 km^{2} (294.3 mi^{2})
- Surface area: .62 km^{2} (0.24 mi^{2})
- Normal elevation: 391.6 m (1,285 ft)

Power Station
- Operators: Kansai Electric Power Co., Inc.
- Commission date: Original: 27 November 1951; New: 20 March 1975
- Hydraulic head: Original: 53 m (174 ft); New: 52.95 m (173.7 ft)
- Turbines: Original: 2 x 18.5 MW Francis-type; New: 1 x 60 MW Francis-type
- Installed capacity: 97 MW

The Narude Dam is a gravity dam on the Shō River about 22 km (14 mi) south of Nanto on the border of Toyama and Gifu Prefectures, Japan. It was constructed between 1950 and 1952. The dam has an associated 97 MW hydroelectric power station which was built in two parts. The first part of the power station (37 MW) was commissioned in 1951 and the second part of the power station (60 MW) was commissioned in 1975. Of the nine dams on the Shō River it is the sixth furthest downstream.

== See also ==
- Akao Dam – downstream
- Tsubawara Dam – upstream
