= Shō River =

Coordinates: 36°47′23″N 137°04′36″E

Shō River 庄川
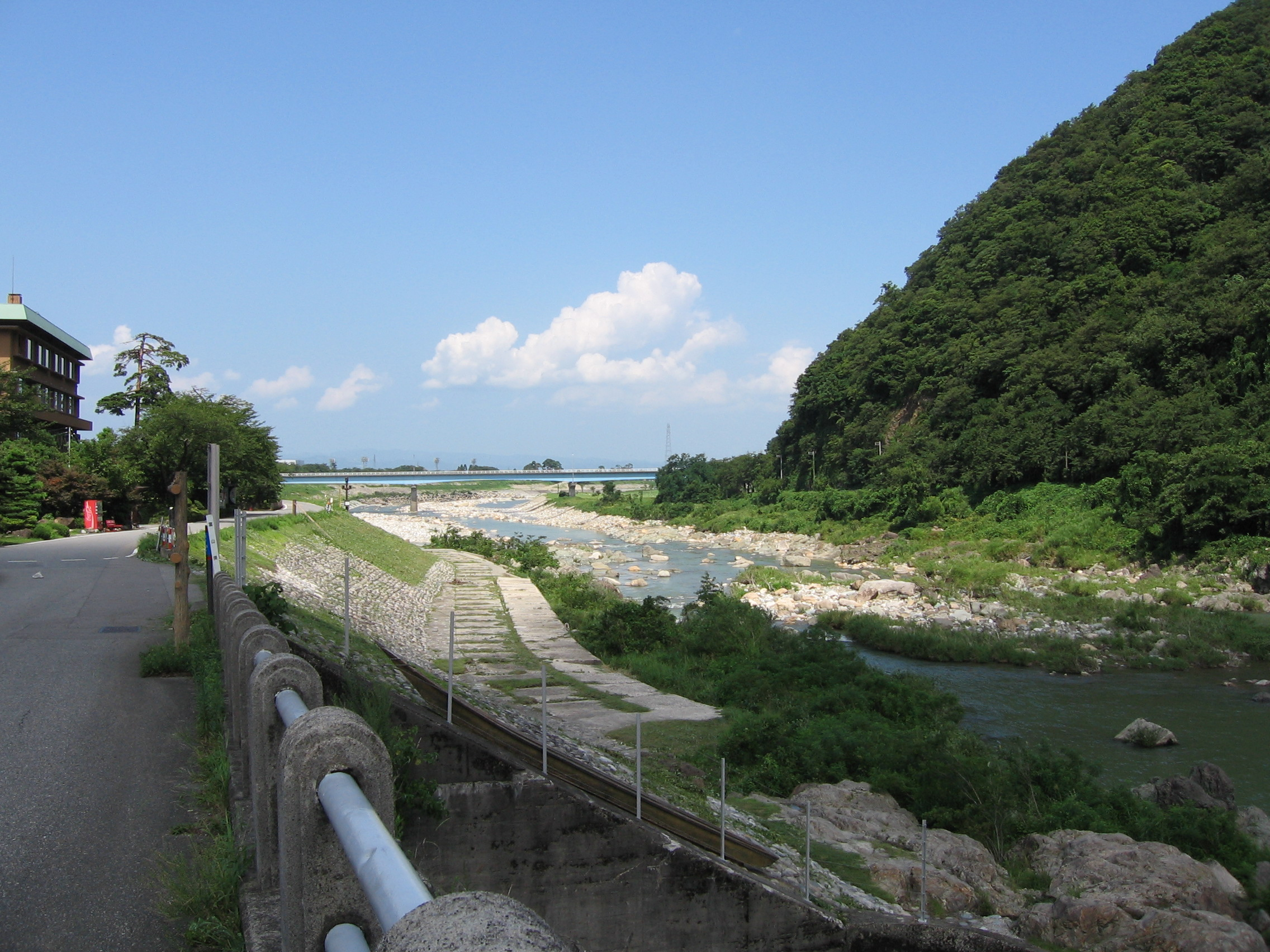
- Shō River in Tonami, Toyama Prefecture

Location
- Country: Japan

Physical characteristics
- Source
  - location: Mount Eboshi
  - elevation: 1,625 m (5,331 ft)
- Mouth
  - location: Toyama Bay
- Length: 115 km (71 mi)
- Basin size: 1,180 km^{2} (460 sq mi)
- Discharge
  - average: 34 m^{3}/s (1,200 cu ft/s)

Basin features
- River system: Shōnai River

The Shō River (庄川, Shō-gawa) has its source in Mount Eboshi (烏帽子岳 Eboshigatake) in the Shōkawa-chō area of Takayama, Gifu Prefecture, Japan. After flowing for 115 km (71 mi) through the northern part of Gifu Prefecture and the western part of Toyama Prefecture, the Class A river empties into Toyama Bay.

== River communities ==
The river passes through or forms the boundary of the communities listed below. The area through which the river flows in Gifu is referred to as Shirakawa-gō, while the area in Toyama is referred to as Gokayama. Both areas are UNESCO World Heritage Sites because of their gasshō-zukuri houses.

Gifu Prefecture
Takayama, Shirakawa (Ōno District)
Toyama Prefecture
Nanto, Tonami, Takaoka, Imizu

=== Tributary ===
- Toga River
- Kotori River

== Dams ==
The river is extensively developed for water storage, flood control and hydroelectric power generation. There are 16 major dams in the basin, seven of them are on tributaries. The major dams collectively have an installed power generation capacity of 926 MW. Six other small hydroelectric plants total 30.6 MW in installed capacity. The 22 hydroelectric power stations in the Shō River basin have an installed capacity of 956.6 MW. The 16 major dams are listed below in order from downstream to upstream.

Toyama

- Wadagawa Dam – 21 m (69 ft) tall gravity dam, 7.4 MW (on the tributary Wadagawa River in Tonami)
- Shogawa Goguchi Dam – 18.5 m (61 ft) tall gravity dam, 23.4 MW
- Komaki Dam – 79.2 m (260 ft) tall gravity dam, 90.2 MW
- Toga Dam – 31 m (102 ft) tall gravity dam, 17.6 MW (on the tributary Togagawa River)
- Soyama Dam – 73.2 m (240 ft) tall gravity dam, 128.1 MW
- Senzoku Dam – 33.5 m (110 ft) tall gravity dam, 32.7 MW (on the tributary Togagawa River)
- Togagawa Dam – 37 m (121 ft) tall gravity dam, 16.1 MW (on the tributary Togagawa River)
- Ohara Dam – 52 m (171 ft) tall gravity dam, 97.6 MW
- Akao Dam – 29.2 m (96 ft) tall gravity dam, 34 MW

Toyama/Gifu:

- Narude Dam – 53.2 m (175 ft) tall gravity dam, 97 MW

Gifu:

- Sakaigawa Dam – 115 m (377 ft) tall gravity dam, 27 MW (on the tributary Sakaigawa River)
- Tsubawara Dam – 68.2 m (224 ft) tall gravity dam, 107 MW
- Hatogaya Dam – 63.2 m (207 ft) tall gravity dam, 43 MW
- Oshirakawa Dam – 95 m (312 ft) tall rock-fill dam, 66.3 MW (on the tributary Oshirakawa River)
- Miboro Dam – 131 m (430 ft) tall rock-fill dam, 256 MW
- Okurodani Dam – 34 m (112 ft) tall rock-fill dam, 21.2 MW (on the tributary Okurodani River)
