= Wadagawa Dam =

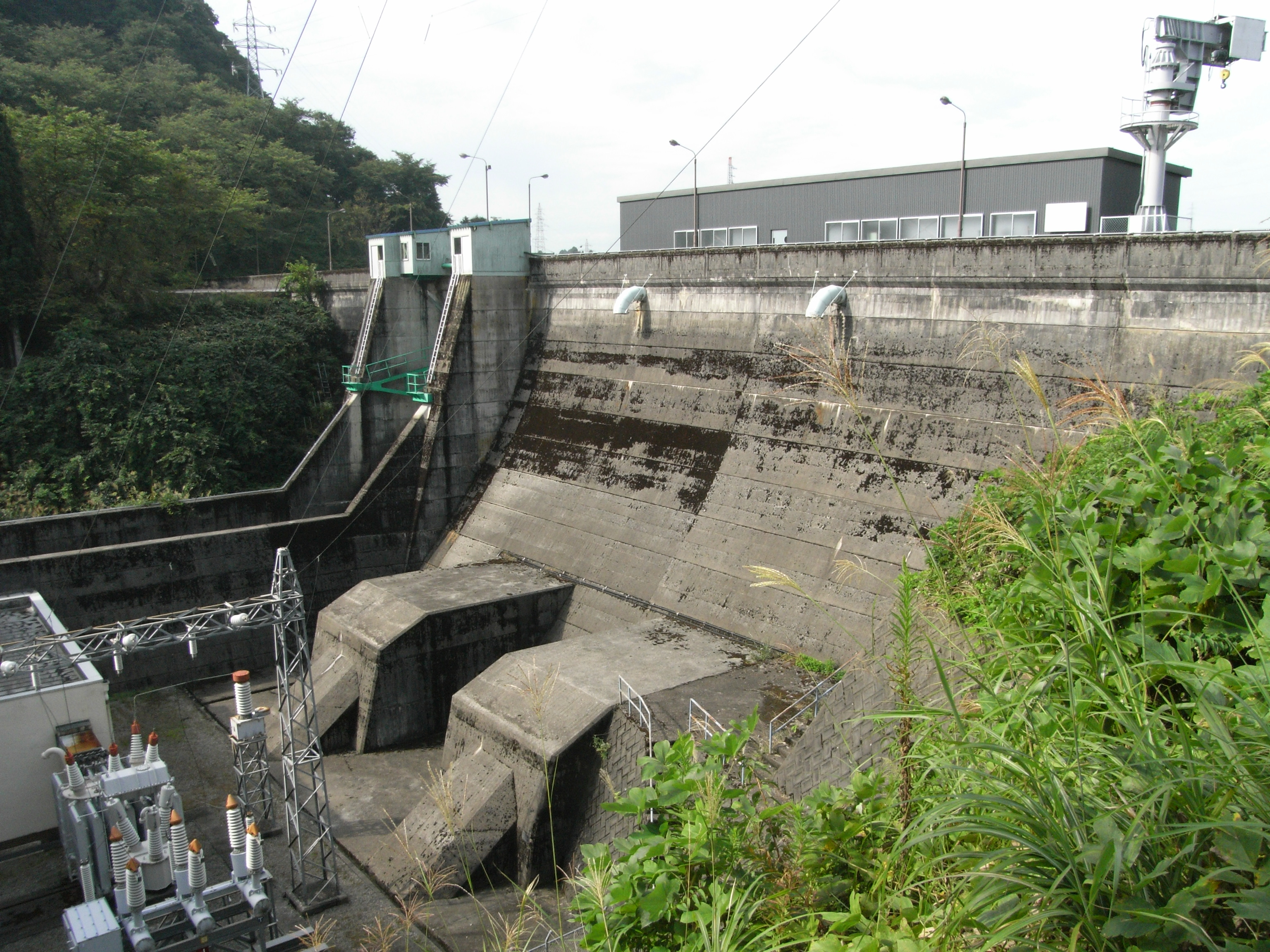

- Location within Japan
- Country: Japan
- Location: Tonami, Toyama Prefecture
- Coordinates: 36°39′16.6″N 137°2′22.29″E
- Purpose: Irrigation, flood control, power
- Status: Operational
- Construction began: 1962
- Opening date: 1967
- Owner: Toyama Prefecture

Dam and spillways
- Type of dam: Gravity
- Impounds: Wadagawa River
- Height: 21 m (69 ft)
- Length: 137 m (449 ft)
- Dam volume: 23,000 m^{3} (30,000 cu yd)

Reservoir
- Total capacity: 3,070,000 m^{3} (2,490 acre⋅ft)
- Active capacity: 1,900,000 m^{3} (1,500 acre⋅ft)

Power Station
- Commission date: December 1968
- Hydraulic head: 18.15 m (59.5 ft)
- Turbines: 2 x 3.7 MW Kaplan-type
- Installed capacity: 7.4 MW
- Annual generation: 40 GWh

The Wadagawa Dam is a gravity dam on the Wadagawa River (a tributary of the Shō River) in Tonami, Toyama Prefecture, Japan. It was constructed between 1962 and 1967. The dam has an associated 7.4 MW hydroelectric power station which was commissioned in 1968. Of the dams in the Shō River system, it is the furthest downstream.

== See also ==
- Shogawa Goguchi Dam – first, and furthest downstream, of nine dams on the Shō River main stem
