= Ohara Dam (Toyama) =

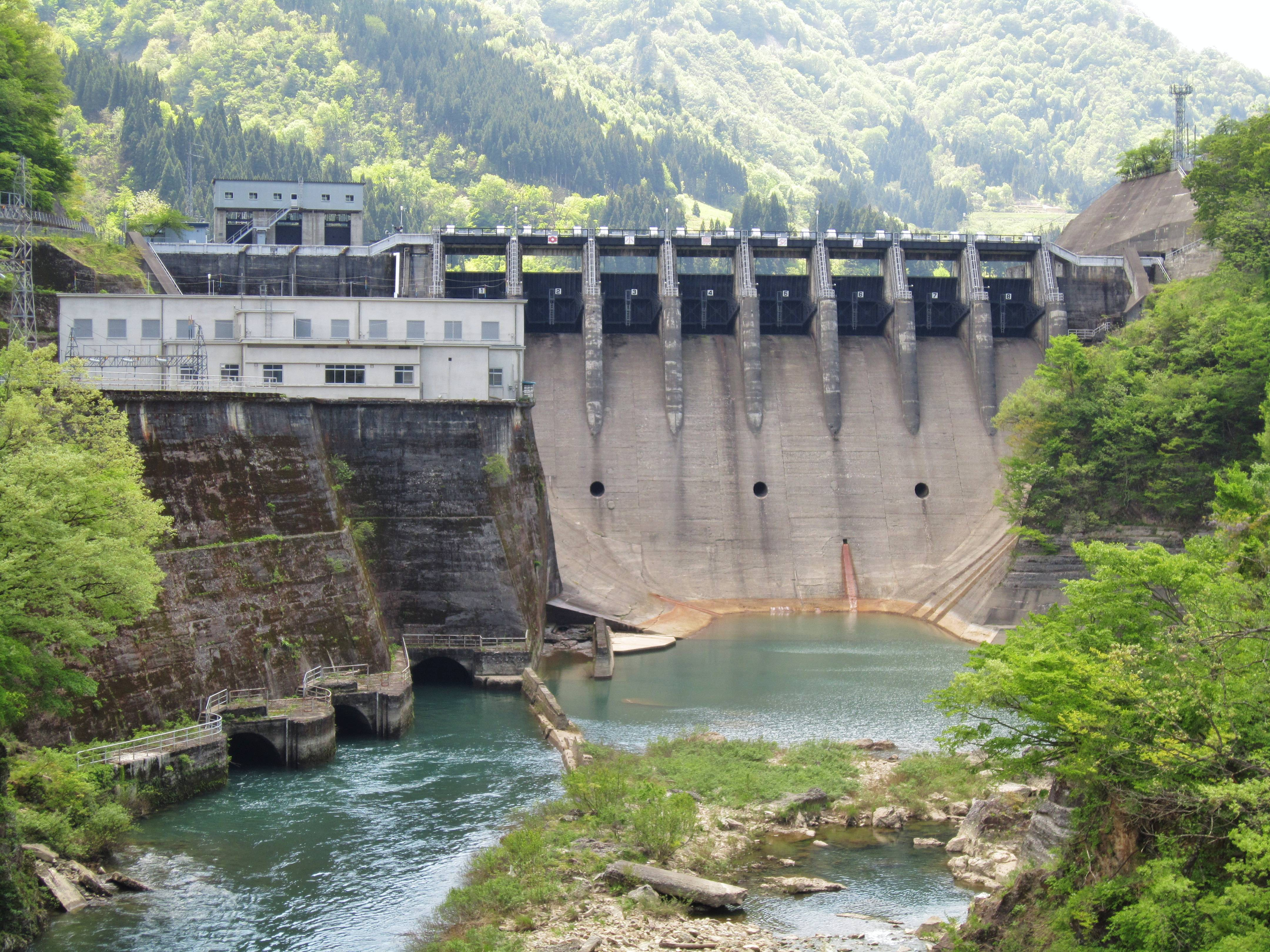
- Downstream face

- Location within Japan
- Country: Japan
- Location: Ohara, Toyama Prefecture
- Coordinates: 36°24′03.97″N 136°54′32.51″E
- Purpose: Power
- Status: Operational
- Construction began: 1939
- Opening date: 1942

Dam and spillways
- Type of dam: Gravity
- Impounds: Shō River
- Height: 52 m (171 ft)
- Length: 158.2 m (519 ft)
- Dam volume: 93,000 m^{3} (122,000 cu yd)
- Spillway type: Crest overflow, 8 tainter gates

Reservoir
- Total capacity: 11,741,000 m^{3} (9,519 acre⋅ft)
- Active capacity: 5,099,000 m^{3} (4,134 acre⋅ft)
- Catchment area: 814.5 km^{2} (314.5 mi^{2})
- Surface area: .56 km^{2} (0.22 mi^{2})
- Normal elevation: 318.6 m (1,045 ft)

Power Station
- Operators: Kansai Electric Power Co., Inc.
- Commission date: Original: 2 December 1942; New: 4 April 1980
- Hydraulic head: Original: 39.2 m (129 ft); New: 52.6 m (173 ft)
- Turbines: Original: 3 x 17.1 MW Francis-type; New: 1 x 46.3 MW Francis-type
- Installed capacity: 97.6 MW

The Ohara Dam is a gravity dam on the Shō River in Ohara village about 17 km (11 mi) south of Nanto in Toyama Prefecture, Japan. It was constructed between 1939 and 1942. The dam has an associated 97.6 MW hydroelectric power station which was built in two parts. The first part of the power station (51.3 MW) was commissioned in 1942 and the second part of the power station (46.3 MW) was commissioned in 1980. Of the nine dams on the Shō River it is the fourth furthest downstream.

Nearby Kuroba Hot Spring offer a panoramic view of the lake water dammed up by the dam.

== See also ==
- Soyama Dam – downstream
- Akao Dam – upstream
