= Akao Dam =

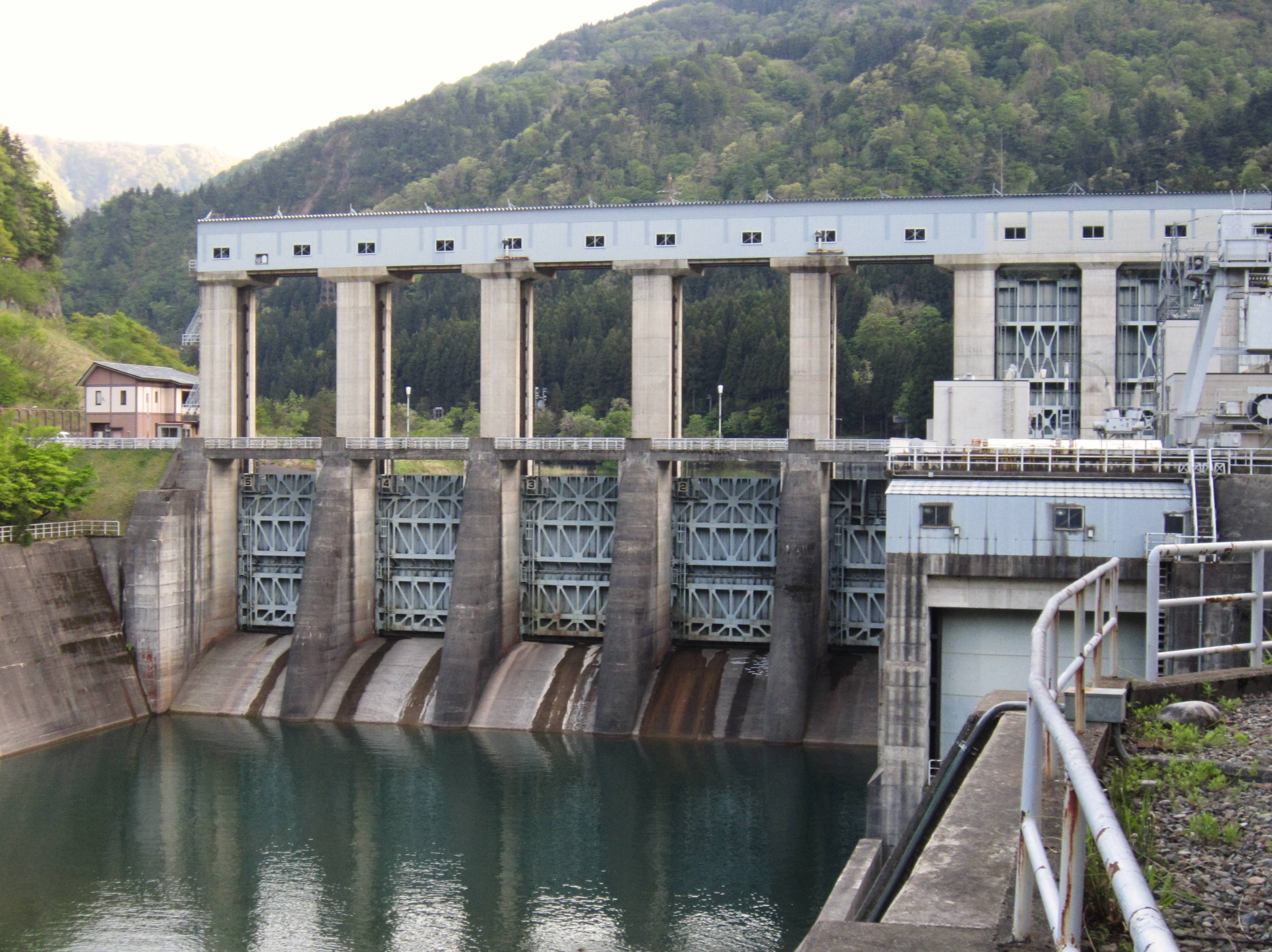
- Downstream face

- Location within Japan
- Location: Nishiakao, Toyama Prefecture, Japan
- Coordinates: 36°22′34.06″N 136°52′13.95″E
- Purpose: Power
- Status: Operational
- Construction began: 1939
- Opening date: 1942

Dam and spillways
- Type of dam: Gravity
- Impounds: Shō River
- Height: 29.2 m (96 ft)
- Length: 153.4 m (503 ft)
- Dam volume: 28,000 m^{3} (37,000 cu yd)
- Spillway type: Crest overflow, 5 roller gates

Reservoir
- Total capacity: 1,465,000 m^{3} (1,188 acre⋅ft)
- Active capacity: 749,000 m^{3} (607 acre⋅ft)
- Catchment area: 778.1 km^{2} (300.4 mi^{2})
- Surface area: .26 km^{2} (0.10 mi^{2})
- Normal elevation: 336.7 m (1,105 ft)

Power Station
- Operators: Kansai Electric Power Co., Inc.
- Commission date: 26 October 1978
- Hydraulic head: 17.4 m (57 ft)
- Turbines: 1 x 34 MW Kaplan-type
- Installed capacity: 34 MW

The Akao Dam is a gravity dam on the Shō River in Nishiakao village about 18 km (11 mi) south of Nanto in Toyama Prefecture, Japan. It was constructed between 1974 and 1978. The dam has an associated 34 MW hydroelectric power station which was commissioned in 1978. Of the nine dams on the Shō River it is the fifth furthest downstream.

== See also ==
- Ohara Dam – downstream
- Narude Dam – upstream
