= Soyama Dam =

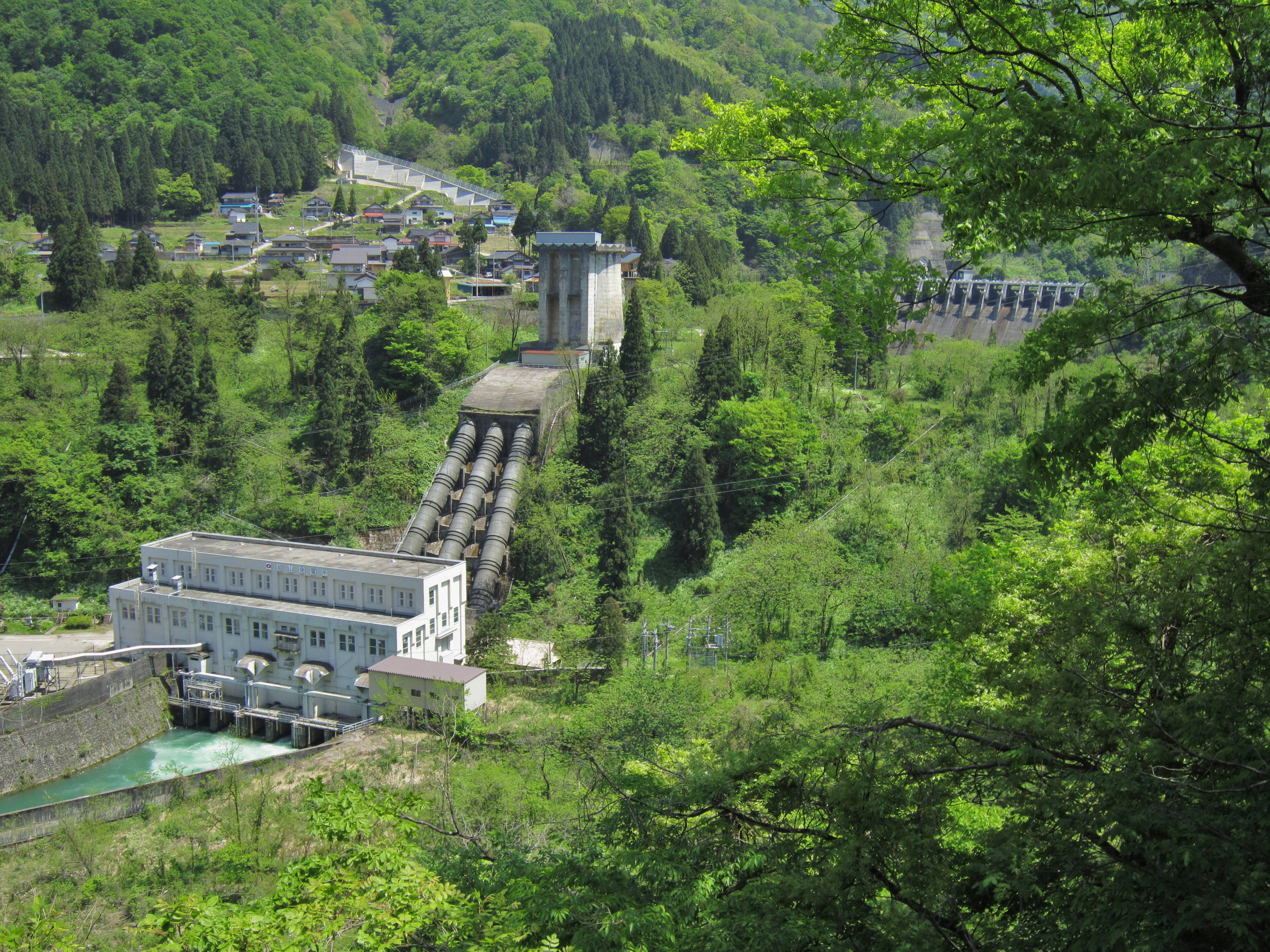
- Power station (foreground), dam (background)

- Location within Japan
- Country: Japan
- Location: Soyama, Toyama Prefecture
- Coordinates: 36°28′20.64″N 136°59′01.38″E
- Purpose: Power
- Status: Operational
- Construction began: 1927
- Opening date: 1930

Dam and spillways
- Type of dam: Gravity
- Impounds: Shō River
- Height: 73.2 m (240 ft)
- Length: 132 m (433 ft)
- Dam volume: 146,000 m^{3} (191,000 cu yd)
- Spillway type: Crest overflow, 12 tainter gates

Reservoir
- Total capacity: 33,850,000 m^{3} (27,440 acre⋅ft)
- Active capacity: 9,205,000 m^{3} (7,463 acre⋅ft)
- Catchment area: 929.4 km^{2} (358.8 mi^{2})
- Surface area: 1.42 km^{2} (0.55 mi^{2})
- Normal elevation: 248.3 m (815 ft)

Power Station
- Operators: Kansai Electric Power Co., Inc.
- Commission date: Original: 5 December 1930; New: 25 February 1967
- Hydraulic head: Original: 67.20 m (220.5 ft); New: 65.7 m (216 ft)
- Turbines: Original: 3 x 18.7 MW Francis-type; New: 1 x 72 MW Francis-type
- Installed capacity: 128.1 MW

The Soyama Dam is a gravity dam on the Shō River in Soyama village about 13 km (8.1 mi) southeast of Nanto in Toyama Prefecture, Japan. It was constructed between 1927 and 1930. The dam has an associated 128.1 MW hydroelectric power station which was built in two parts. The first part of the power station (56.1 MW) was commissioned in 1930 and the second part of the power station (72 MW) was commissioned in 1967. Of the nine dams on the Shō River it is the third furthest downstream.

== See also ==
- Komaki Dam – downstream
- Ohara Dam – upstream
