= Shogawa Goguchi Dam =

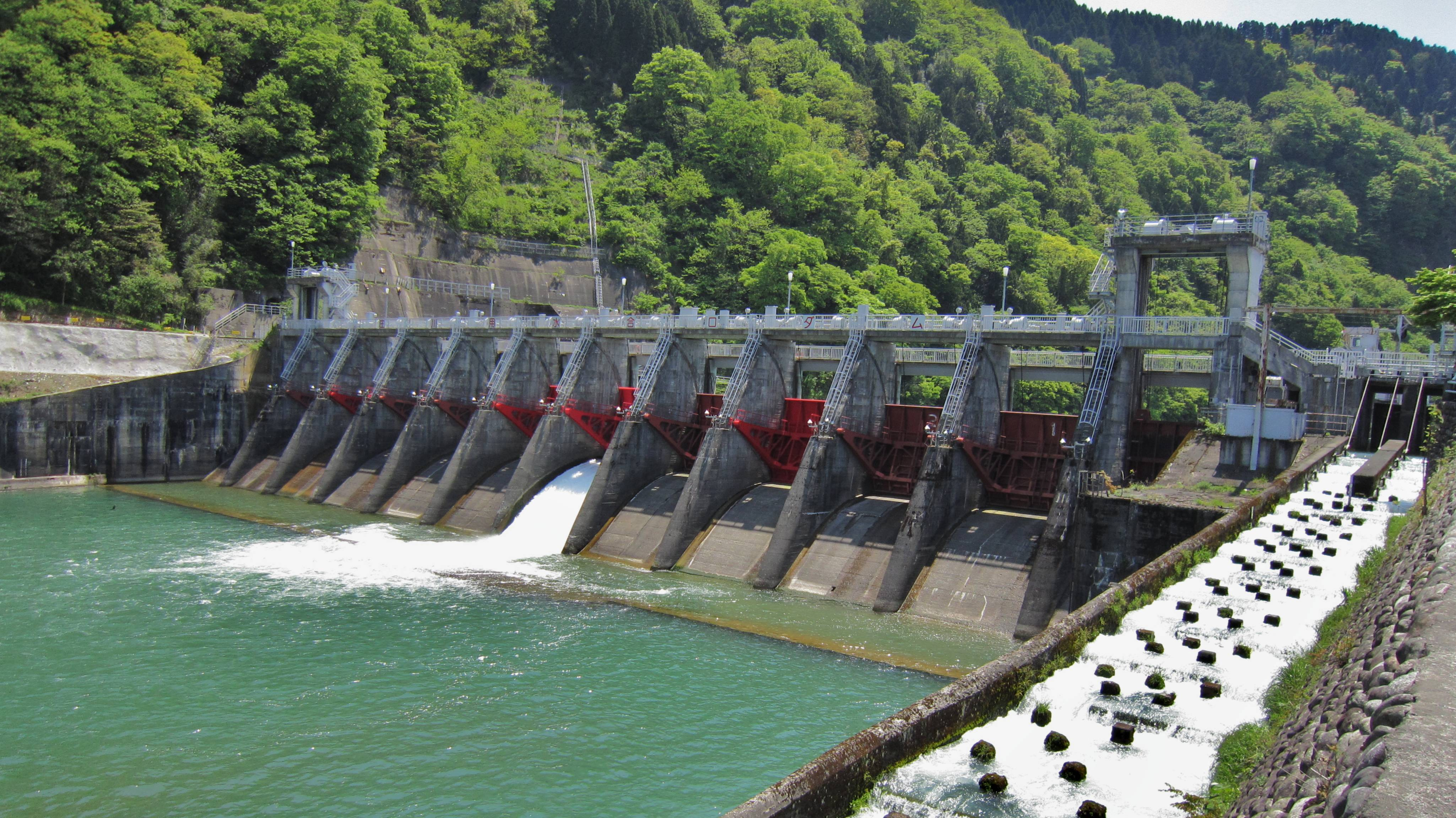

- Location within Japan
- Country: Japan
- Location: Shogawa, Toyama Prefecture
- Coordinates: 36°34′30.67″N 136°59′44.42″E
- Purpose: Irrigation, flood control, power
- Status: Operational
- Construction began: 1934
- Opening date: 1939

Dam and spillways
- Type of dam: Gravity
- Impounds: Shō River
- Height: 18.5 m (61 ft)
- Length: 103.3 m (339 ft)
- Dam volume: 20,000 m^{3} (26,000 cu yd)

Reservoir
- Total capacity: 626,000 m^{3} (508 acre⋅ft)
- Active capacity: 405,000 m^{3} (328 acre⋅ft)
- Catchment area: 1,113 km^{2} (430 mi^{2})
- Surface area: 16 ha (40 acres)

Power Station
- Operators: Kansai Electric Power Co., Inc.
- Commission date: Stage I: 13 December 1939; Stage II: 24 March 1967
- Hydraulic head: Stage I: 17.66 m (57.9 ft); Stage II: 18.22 m (59.8 ft)
- Turbines: Stage I: 2 x 4.2 MW Kaplan-type; Stage II: 1 x 15 MW Kaplan-type
- Installed capacity: 23.4 MW

The Shogawa Goguchi Dam is a gravity dam on the Shō River in Shogawa, Toyama Prefecture, Japan. It was constructed between 1934 and 1939. The dam has an associated 23.4 MW hydroelectric power station which was commissioned in two stages, December 1939 and March 1967. Of the nine dams on the Shō River it is the furthest downstream.

== See also ==
- Wadagawa Dam – downstream on a tributary of the Shō River
