= Miboro Dam =

Coordinates: 36°08′17.7″N 136°54′38.9″E

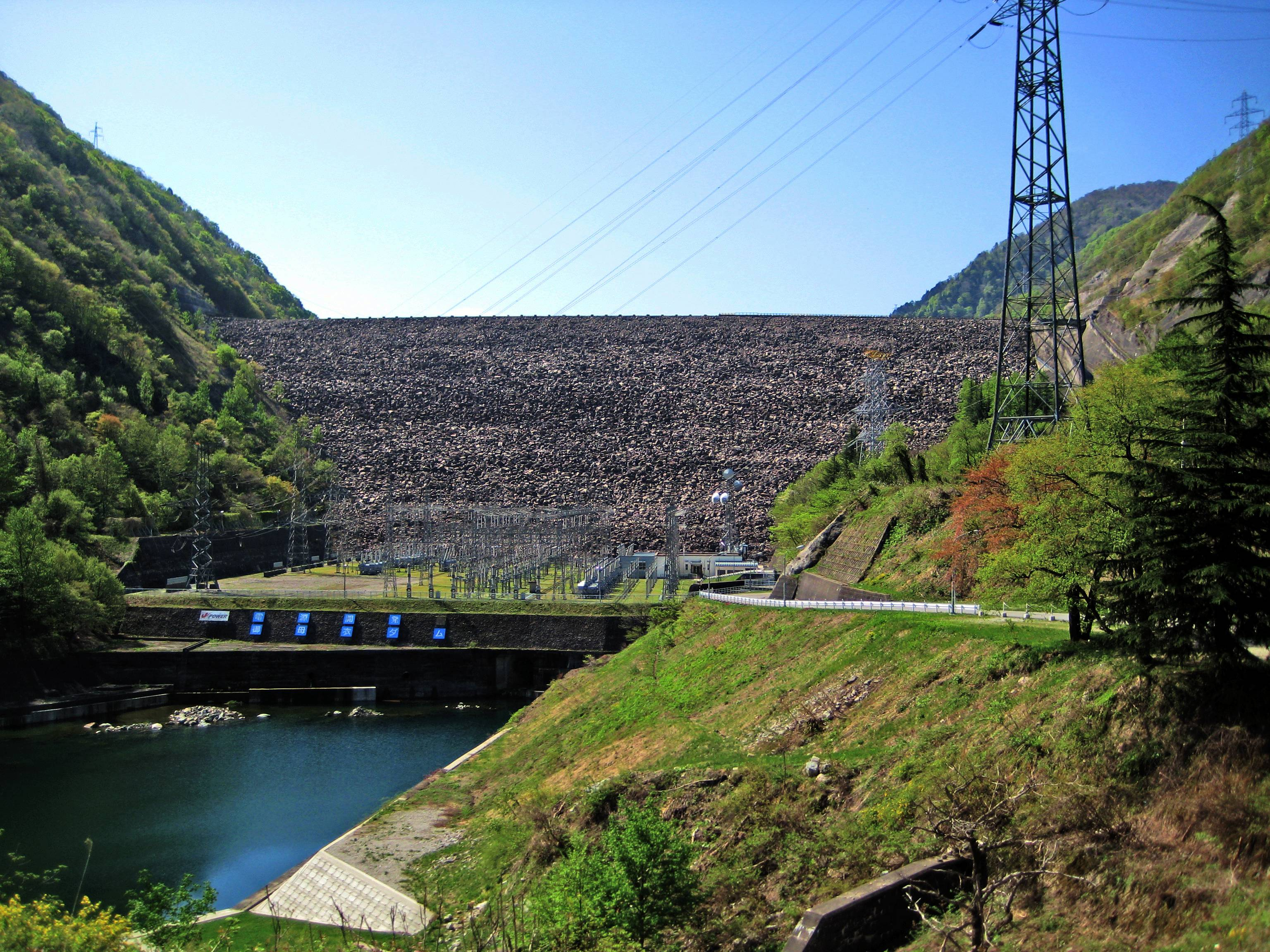
- Location: Shirakawa, Gifu Prefecture, Japan
- Purpose: Power
- Status: Operational
- Construction began: 1957
- Opening date: 1961

Dam and spillways
- Type of dam: Embankment, rock-fill
- Impounds: Shō River
- Height: 131 m (430 ft)
- Length: 405 m (1,329 ft)
- Elevation at crest: 766 m (2,513 ft)
- Width (crest): 12 m (39 ft)
- Width (base): 560 m (1,840 ft)
- Dam volume: 7,950,000 m^{3} (10,400,000 cu yd)
- Spillways: 3
- Spillway type: 1 x roller gate, 1 x drum gate, lower discharge tunnel

Reservoir
- Total capacity: 370,000,000 m^{3} (300,000 acre⋅ft)
- Active capacity: 330,000,000 m^{3} (270,000 acre⋅ft)
- Catchment area: 442.8 km^{2} (171.0 sq mi)
- Surface area: 8.8 km^{2} (3.4 sq mi)
- Normal elevation: 760 m (2,490 ft)

Power Station
- Operator(s): Kansai Electric Power Co., Inc.
- Commission date: January/May 1961
- Hydraulic head: 192.1 m (630 ft)
- Turbines: 2 x 128 MW Francis-type
- Installed capacity: 256 MW

Miboro Dam (御母衣ダム, Miboro damu) is a dam on the Shō River in Shirakawa, in Gifu Prefecture, Japan. It supports a 256 MW hydroelectric power station. Of the nine dams on the Shō River, it is the furthest upstream.

The dam flooded several villages and shrines, submerging them completely, two cherry trees were taken from one of the submerged shrines and placed in Shirakawa-go where it is said that each petal represents a memory from someone who lived in the villages before they were flooded.

Over 200 houses were to be submerged, including Minka houses, and about 1,200 people were forced to relocate, so the residents of the planned submerged area violently opposed the dam construction plan. In 1961, all structures were submerged and the dam was completed.

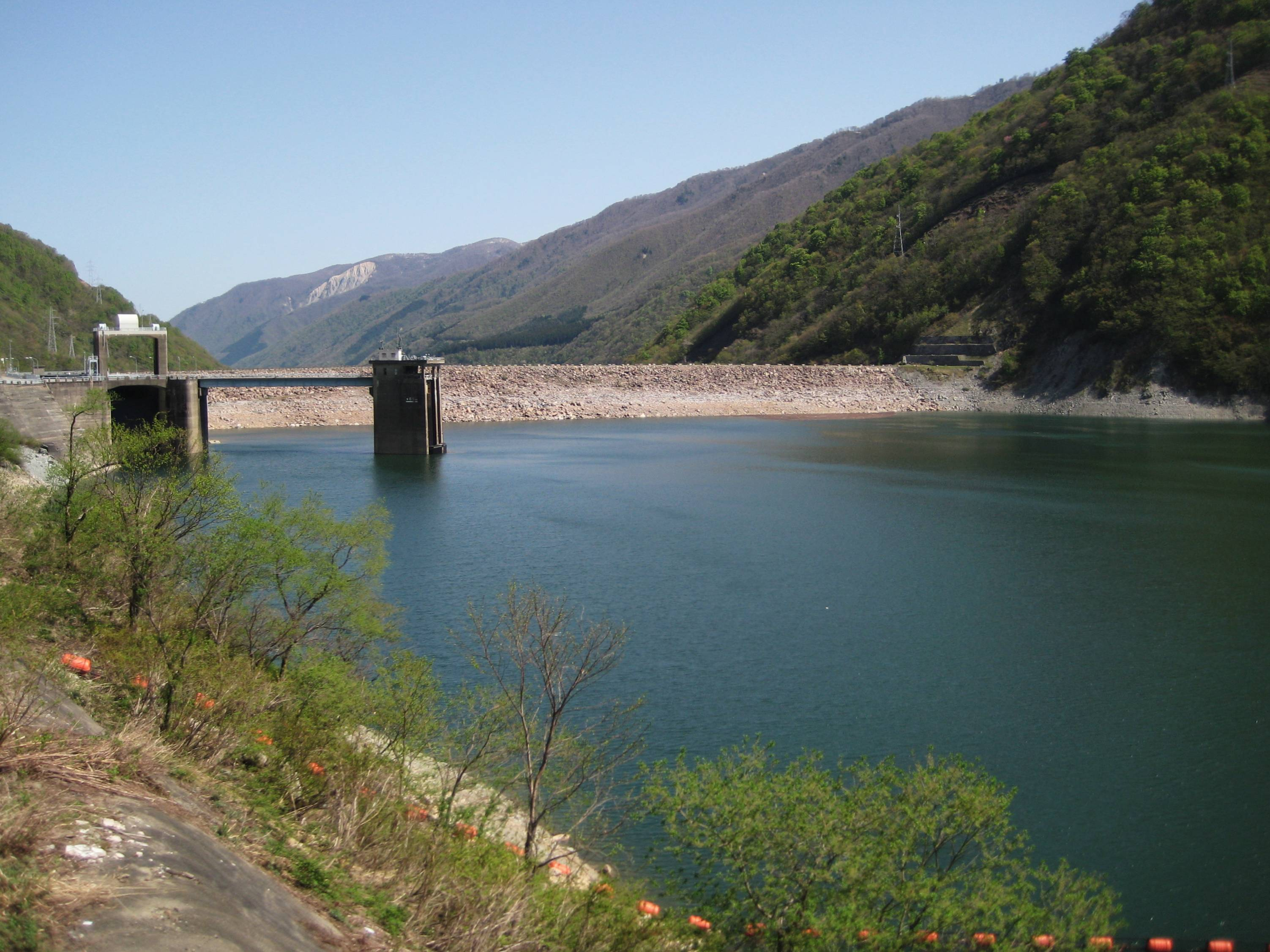
