= Shogawa, Toyama =

Dissolved municipality in Toyama prefecture, Japan

Shōgawa (庄川町, Shōgawa-machi) was a town located in Higashitonami District, Toyama Prefecture, Japan.

As of 2003, the town had an estimated population of 7,285 and a density of 236.99 persons per km^{2}. The total area was 30.74 km^{2}.

On November 1, 2004, Shōgawa was merged into the expanded city of Tonami.
