= Shirakawa, Gifu (village) =

Shirakawa 白川村
- Village
- Shirakawa Village

- Flag Seal

- Location of Shirakawa in Gifu Prefecture

- Coordinates: 36°16′15.4″N 136°53′54.8″E
- Country: Japan
- Region: Chūbu
- Prefecture: Gifu
- District: Ōno

Government
  - Mayor: Shigeru Narihara

Area
  - Total: 356.64 km^{2} (137.70 sq mi)

Population (January 1, 2019)
  - Total: 1,630
  - Density: 4.57/km^{2} (11.8/sq mi)
- Time zone: UTC+9 (Japan Standard Time)
- Phone number: 05769-6-1311
- Address: 517 Hatogaya, Shirakawa-mura, Ōno-gun, Gifu-ken501-5692
- Climate: Dfa
- Website: Official website (in Japanese)
- Symbols
- Flower: Rhododendron
- Tree: Siebold's beech

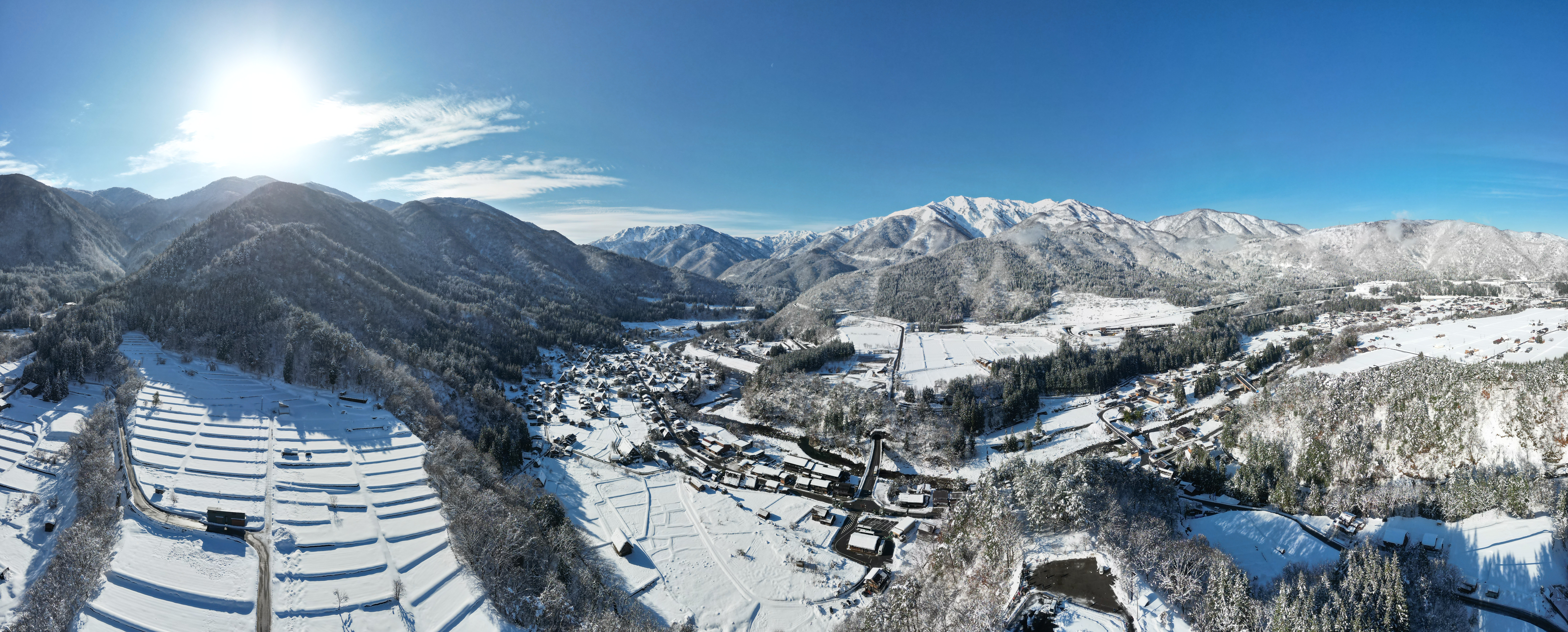
Shirakawa-go 白川村 from above

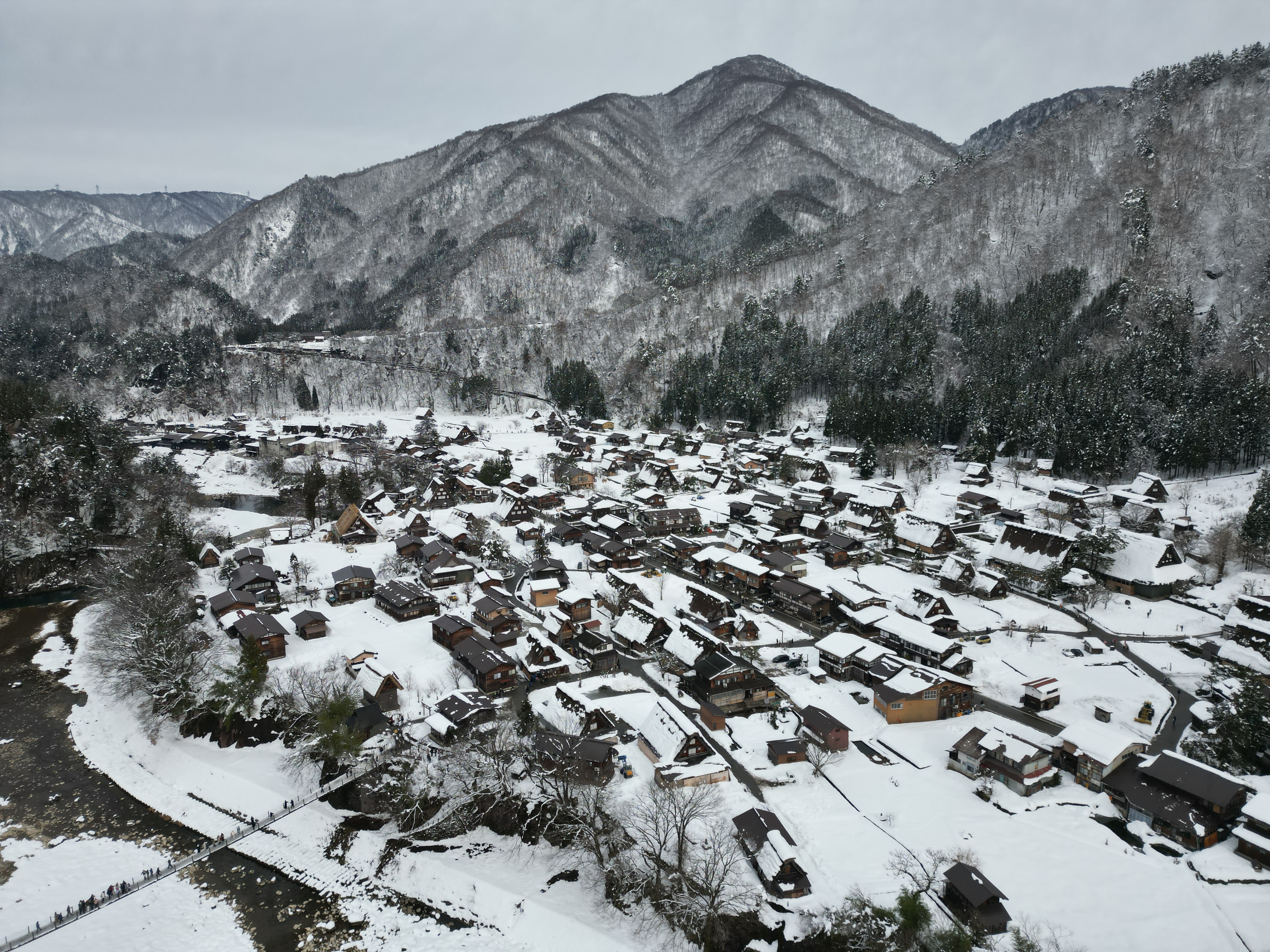
Shirakawa-go 白川村 in winter

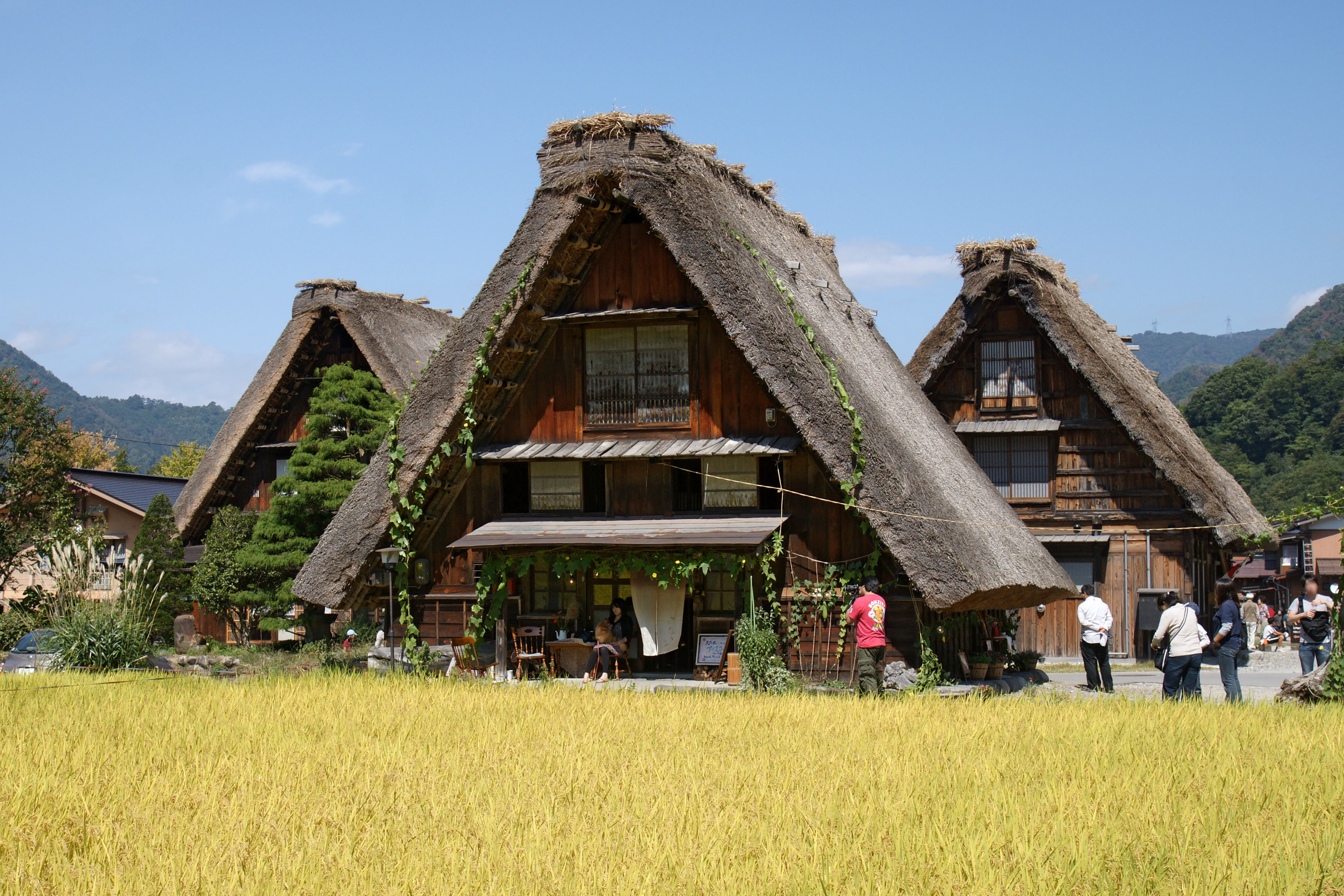
Gasshō-zukuri - traditionally thatched houses in Shirakawa-go

Shirakawa (白川村, Shirakawa-mura; lit. 'White River Village') is a village located in Ōno District, Gifu Prefecture, Japan. It is best known for being the site of Shirakawa-gō, a small, traditional village showcasing a building style known as gasshō-zukuri. Together with Gokayama in Nanto, Toyama, it is one of UNESCO's World Heritage Sites.

As of 1 January 2019, the village had an estimated population of 1,630 in 588 households and a population density of 4.6 persons per km^{2}. The total area of the village was 356.55 km^{2} (137.66 sq mi).

== Geography ==
Shirakawa is a mountain village located in far northern Gifu Prefecture, bordering Ishikawa Prefecture and Toyama Prefecture on the Ryōhaku Mountains. Mount Hakusan is the highest elevation at 2,172 metres (7,126 ft). The village's area is 95.7% mountainous forests, and its steep places are characteristic. In between the mountains flows the Shō River, which continues to the north into Nanto, Toyama. Most of the population is in its river valley. Since the opening of Hida Tunnel, Shirakawa can be reached within 50 minutes from Takayama, Gifu compared to the earlier three hour drive, and only an hour to Nanto in Toyama.

=== Neighbouring municipalities ===
- Gifu Prefecture
  - Hida
  - Takayama
- Ishikawa Prefecture
  - Hakusan
- Toyama Prefecture
  - Nanto

== Climate ==
Shirakawa Village has a humid continental climate (Koppen Dfa). It features four distinct seasons with winter being its most recognized. Shirakawa is noted as one of the snowiest places in Japan. Yearly average snowfall amounts average out in excess of 10 meters (390 in) with snowbanks developing well over 2 meters tall. As a consequence of the frequent heavy snow, characteristically thick thatched roofed gasshō-zukuri (合掌造り) houses were created. With the Hakusan National Park mountain ranges as a background, these sites are major tourist attractions.

Climate data for Shirakawa (1991–2020 normals, extremes 1978–present)
| Month | Jan | Feb | Mar | Apr | May | Jun | Jul | Aug | Sep | Oct | Nov | Dec | Year |
|---|---|---|---|---|---|---|---|---|---|---|---|---|---|
| Record high °C (°F) | 15.5 (59.9) | 16.5 (61.7) | 23.7 (74.7) | 29.9 (85.8) | 32.1 (89.8) | 34.4 (93.9) | 36.3 (97.3) | 36.5 (97.7) | 34.8 (94.6) | 29.8 (85.6) | 25.5 (77.9) | 20.0 (68.0) | 36.5 (97.7) |
| Mean daily maximum °C (°F) | 2.8 (37.0) | 3.8 (38.8) | 8.3 (46.9) | 15.6 (60.1) | 21.8 (71.2) | 24.9 (76.8) | 28.2 (82.8) | 29.6 (85.3) | 25.1 (77.2) | 19.2 (66.6) | 12.9 (55.2) | 5.9 (42.6) | 16.5 (61.7) |
| Daily mean °C (°F) | −1.0 (30.2) | −0.8 (30.6) | 2.5 (36.5) | 8.8 (47.8) | 14.9 (58.8) | 19.0 (66.2) | 22.7 (72.9) | 23.6 (74.5) | 19.4 (66.9) | 13.2 (55.8) | 7.1 (44.8) | 1.7 (35.1) | 10.9 (51.6) |
| Mean daily minimum °C (°F) | −4.4 (24.1) | −5.0 (23.0) | −2.3 (27.9) | 2.7 (36.9) | 8.6 (47.5) | 14.1 (57.4) | 18.6 (65.5) | 19.2 (66.6) | 15.2 (59.4) | 8.8 (47.8) | 2.8 (37.0) | −1.7 (28.9) | 6.4 (43.5) |
| Record low °C (°F) | −16.4 (2.5) | −15.8 (3.6) | −15.5 (4.1) | −8.3 (17.1) | −0.7 (30.7) | 4.2 (39.6) | 10.8 (51.4) | 11.7 (53.1) | 3.6 (38.5) | −1.8 (28.8) | −8.3 (17.1) | −14.9 (5.2) | −16.4 (2.5) |
| Average precipitation mm (inches) | 281.8 (11.09) | 204.5 (8.05) | 195.8 (7.71) | 151.6 (5.97) | 128.8 (5.07) | 187.1 (7.37) | 277.7 (10.93) | 190.5 (7.50) | 214.5 (8.44) | 167.9 (6.61) | 181.6 (7.15) | 282.8 (11.13) | 2,458.2 (96.78) |
| Average snowfall cm (inches) | 340 (134) | 251 (99) | 149 (59) | 19 (7.5) | 1 (0.4) | 0 (0) | 0 (0) | 0 (0) | 0 (0) | 0 (0) | 12 (4.7) | 201 (79) | 972 (383) |
| Average precipitation days (≥ 1.0 mm) | 22.2 | 17.1 | 16.7 | 13.2 | 11.7 | 11.8 | 15.0 | 11.4 | 13.2 | 12.6 | 15.4 | 21.2 | 181.6 |
| Mean monthly sunshine hours | 41.2 | 62.1 | 105.0 | 160.8 | 196.9 | 150.6 | 149.4 | 175.1 | 125.0 | 121.3 | 88.8 | 47.0 | 1,417.8 |
Source: Japan Meteorological Agency (1991–2020 normals, extremes 1978–present)

== Demographics ==
Per Japanese census data, the population of Shirakawa has decreased over the past 50 years, with a small uptick around the year 2000.

Historical population
| Year | Pop. | ±% |
|---|---|---|
| 1970 | 2,525 | — |
| 1980 | 2,132 | −15.6% |
| 1990 | 1,892 | −11.3% |
| 2000 | 2,151 | +13.7% |
| 2010 | 1,733 | −19.4% |
| 2020 | 1,511 | −12.8% |

== History ==
The area around Shirakawa was part of traditional Hida Province. During the post-Meiji restoration cadastral reforms, the area was organized into Ōno District, Gifu. The village of Shirakawa was formed on July 1, 1897, with the establishment of the modern municipalities system.

== Economy ==
=== Agriculture ===
The only major agricultural product in the area is rice. Initially, local rice was often mixed by agricultural cooperatives with rice from Takayama and the adjacent Hida. The local mixed rice that was put on the market was thus initially labelled as "Hida Koshihikari". However, after some legal efforts, a local brand, "Shirakawa-go Koshihikari", was born. The initiative focused on the "independence" of local rice production and rice-related trade and the creation of a sweet industry based on the local rice production.

=== Tourism ===
There are many reasons why the village survived over the years without becoming a ghost town. However, one of the main reasons was due to the tourism-related income generated by gassho-zukuri villages. This kind of architecture has been significantly famous amongst tourists over the years. Tourism grew in the area especially for this reason; increasing even more after the area became a UNESCO site in 1995. Thus, the local economy is dominated strongly by seasonal tourism, improving the local financial conditions of the village yearly. The industry is so big that 70% of the residents work in the tourist industry.

However, the increasing number of visitors has resulted in damage to the area from pollution, and by local inhabitants turning their homes into hostels, gift shops and parking lots, which in turn has endangered its World Heritage status. There is also a fear growing that the change to catering to tourists will harm the charm of the area's simplicity and fundamental Japanese scenery.

It is also worth noting that 95% of visitors are day trippers, and the average consumption per person is only a few thousand yen. Thus the growth, whilst there, is not exponential, especially due to the fact that there are only few local products, and most souvenirs are bought from outside the area and resold.

== Education ==
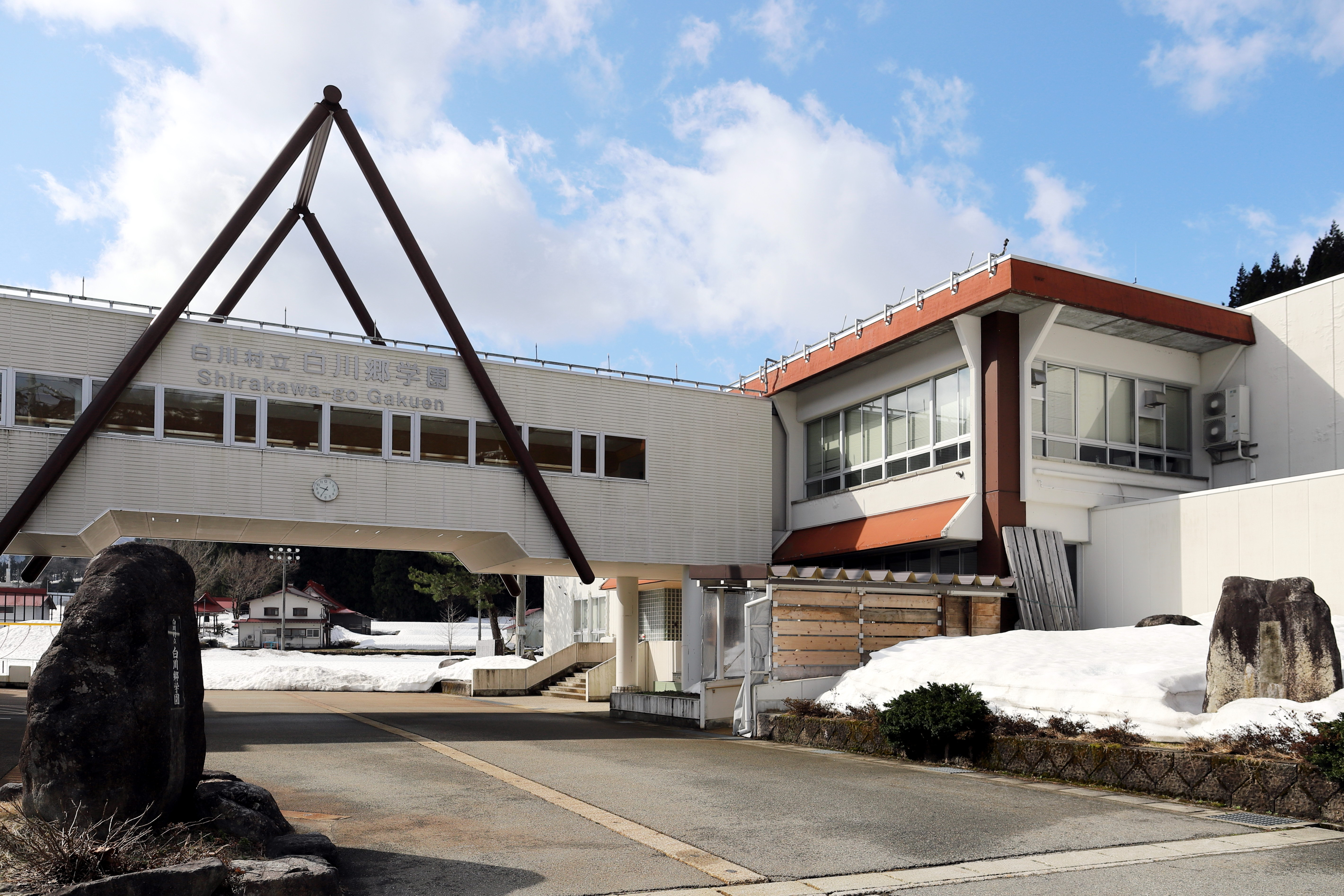
Shirakawa-go Gakuen (白川村立白川郷学園), the municipal combined elementary and junior high school

Shirakawa has one combined public elementary/junior high school, Shirakawa-go Gakuen (白川村立白川郷学園), operated by the village government.

The former Hirase Elementary School (白川村立平瀬小学校) is now the Southern District Cultural Center (白川村南部地区文化会館).

The village does not have a high school.

== Transportation ==
=== Railway ===
- Shirakawa village does not have any passenger railway service.

=== Bus ===
- Shirakawa-go Bus Terminal
  - For Nagoya Sta., Takayama Sta., Takaoka Station, Toyama Sta., Gero Sta. and Kanazawa Sta.

=== Highway ===
- E41 Tōkai-Hokuriku Expressway
- National Route 156
- National Route 360

== Sister cities ==
- Alberobello, Apulia, Italy, since March 3, 2005

== Local attractions ==
- Amau Pass (天生峠, Amau tōge), famous for its fall colors; 30 minutes away by foot is the Kōsō wetlands, also famous
- Hakusan Rindō (hiking path)
- Hida Tunnel
- The Historic Villages of Shirakawa-gō and Gokayama are designated UNESCO World Heritage sites
  - Wadake Home—the largest gasshō-zukuri in the area
- Miboro dam, Lake Miboro
- Shirakawa-gō Hirase Onsen (designated as a "national recuperation onsen")
- Shirakawa Hachiman Shrine, where every October 14–15, the Doburoku Festival, famous for its Nigorizake, is held

== Gallery ==
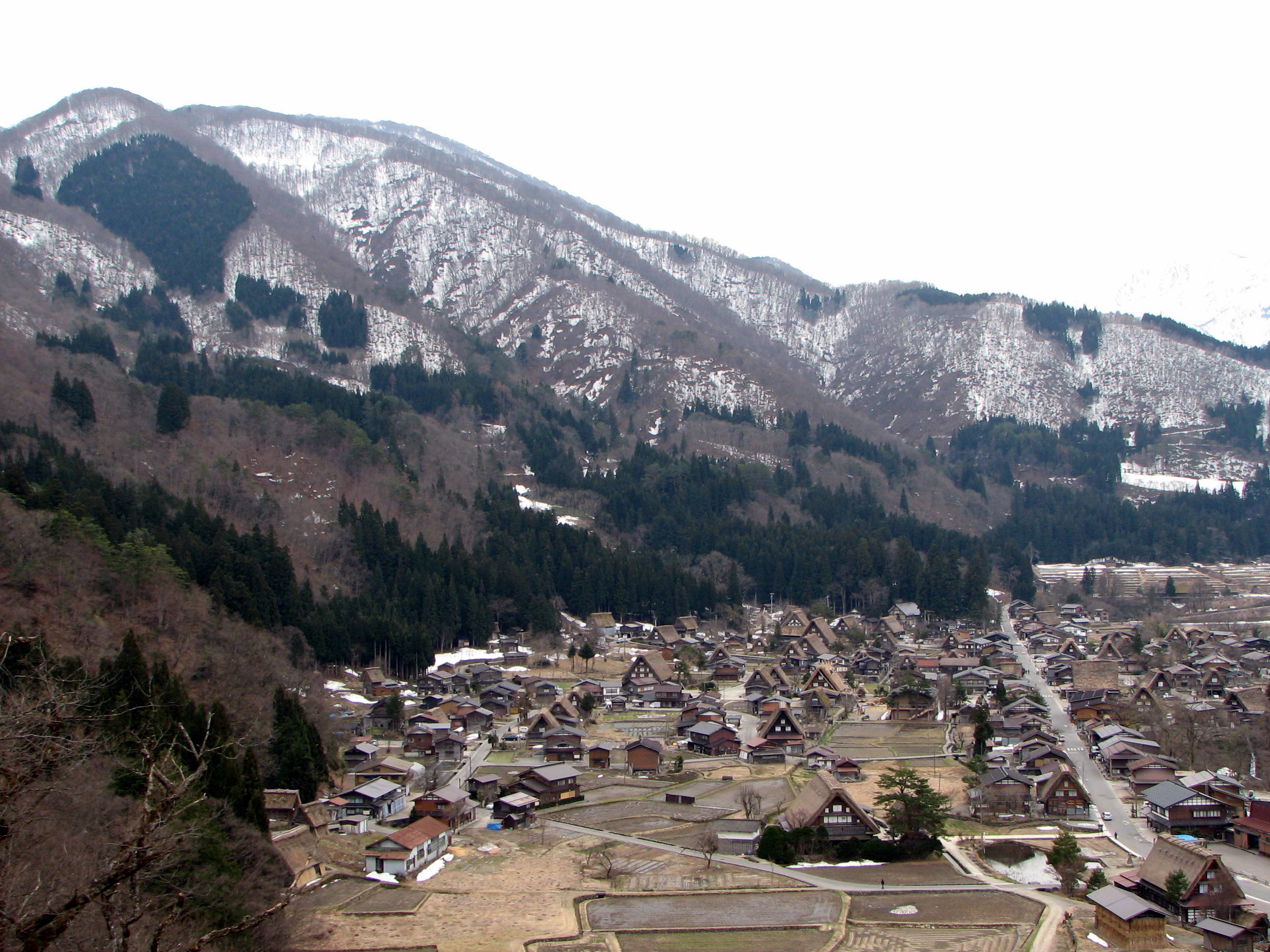
Ogimachi village in Shirakawa-gō

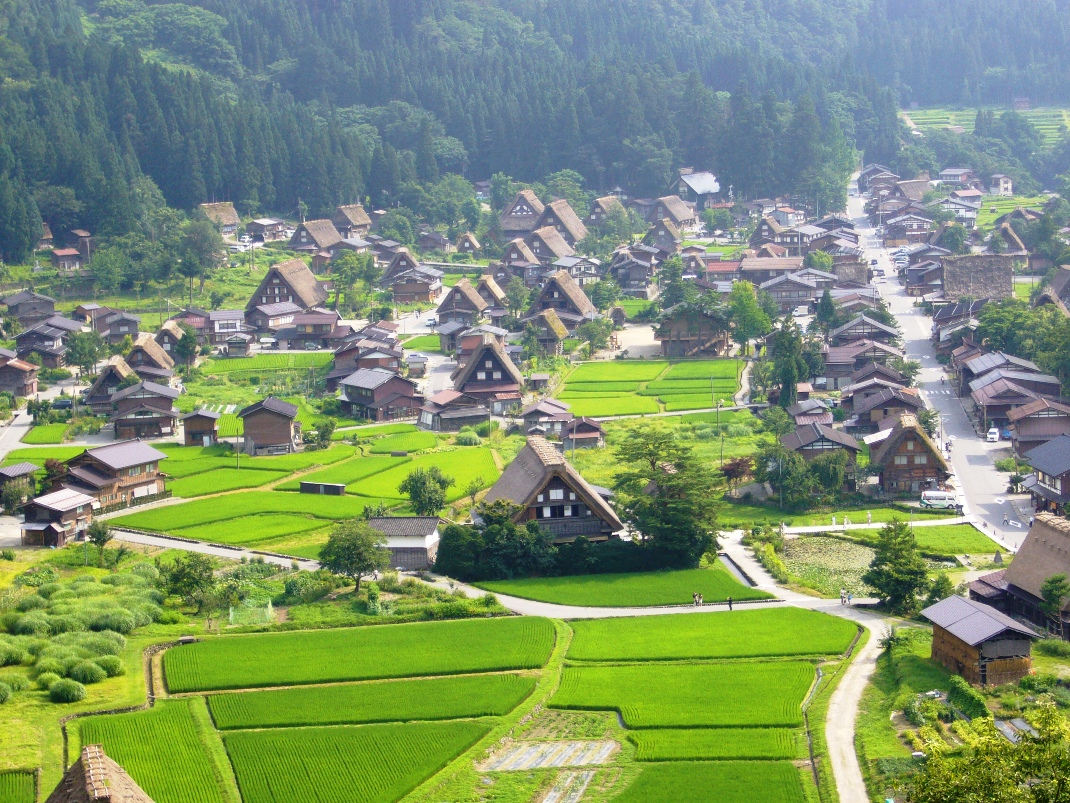
Shirakawa

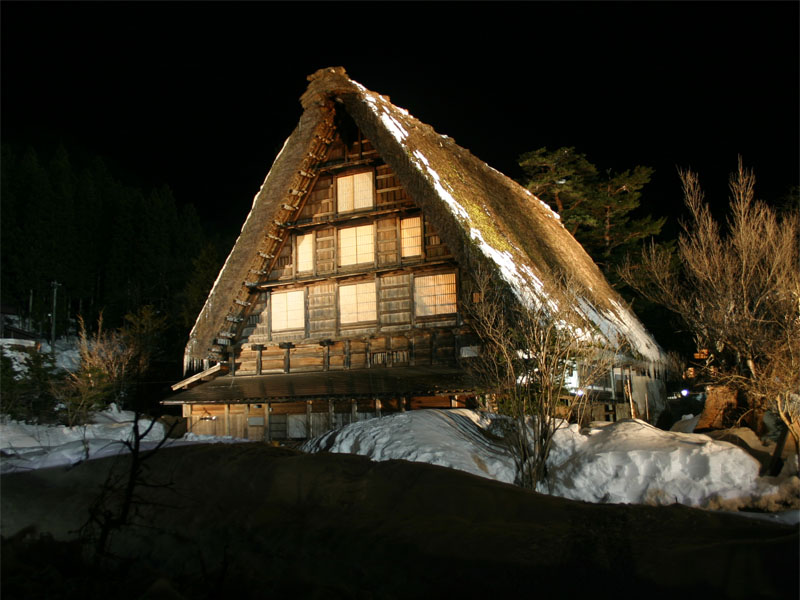
Traditional housing in Shirakawa-gō

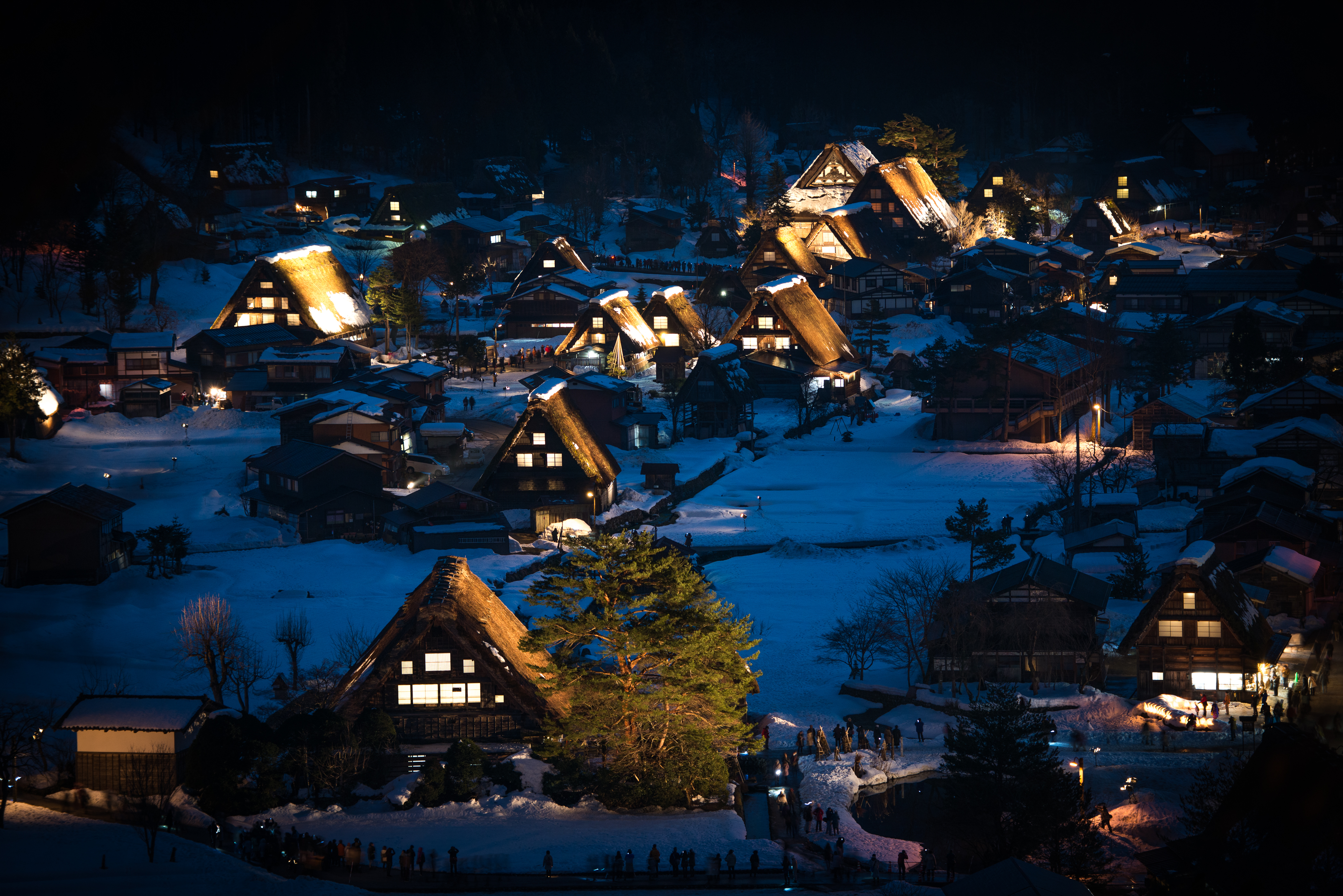
Shirakawa-gō at night

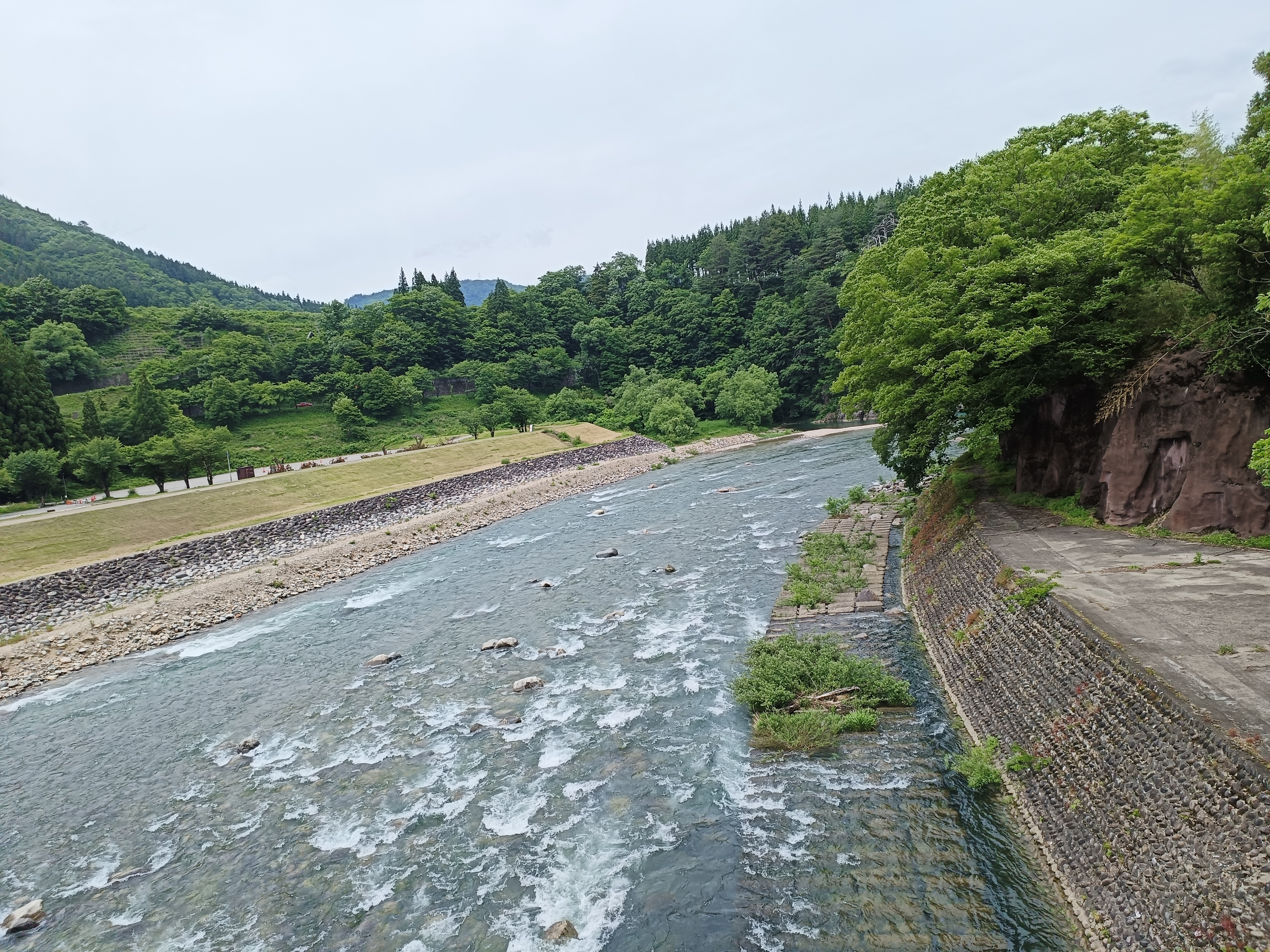
Shō River flowing through Shirakawa-gō

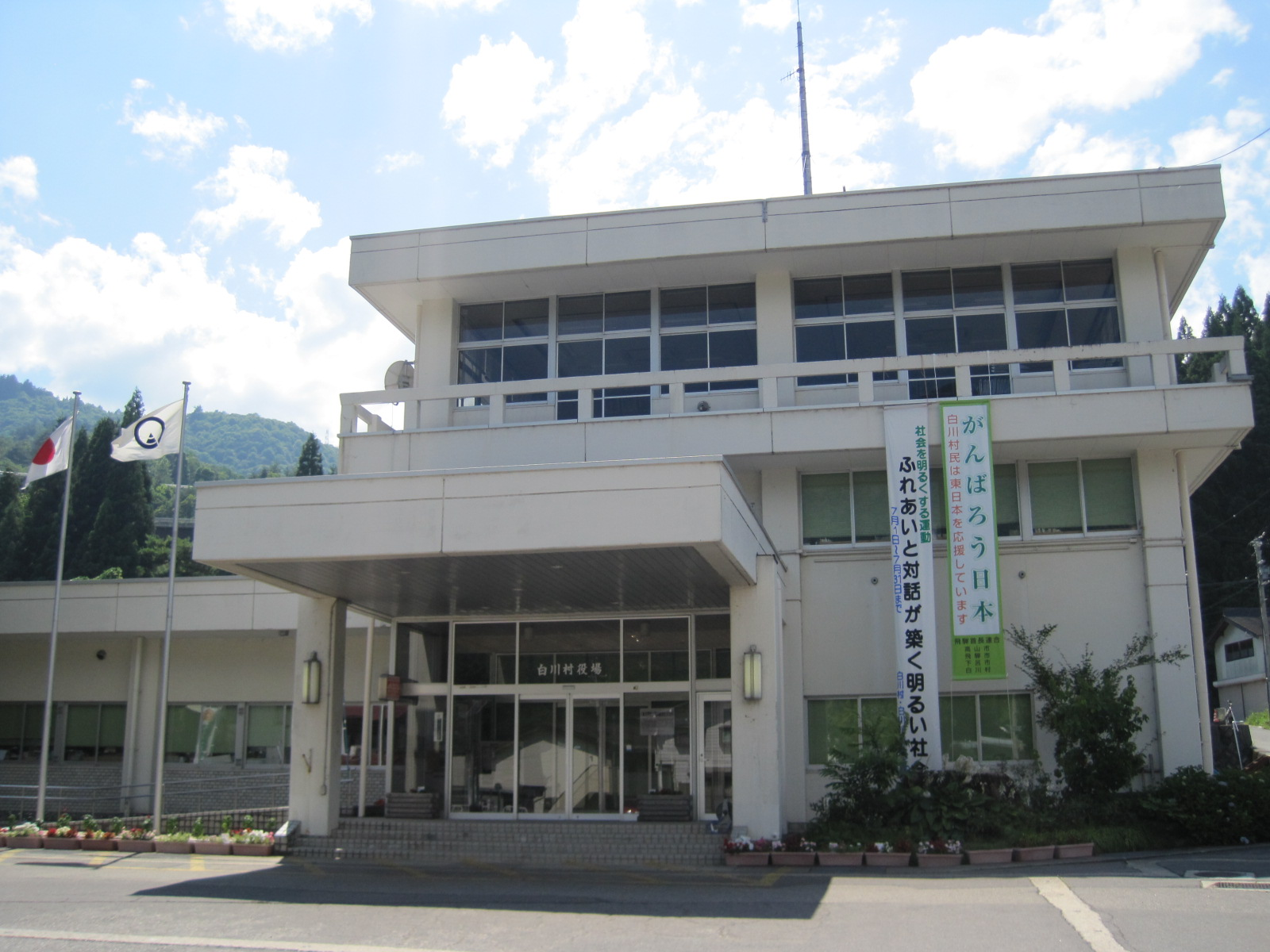
Shirakawa Village Hall

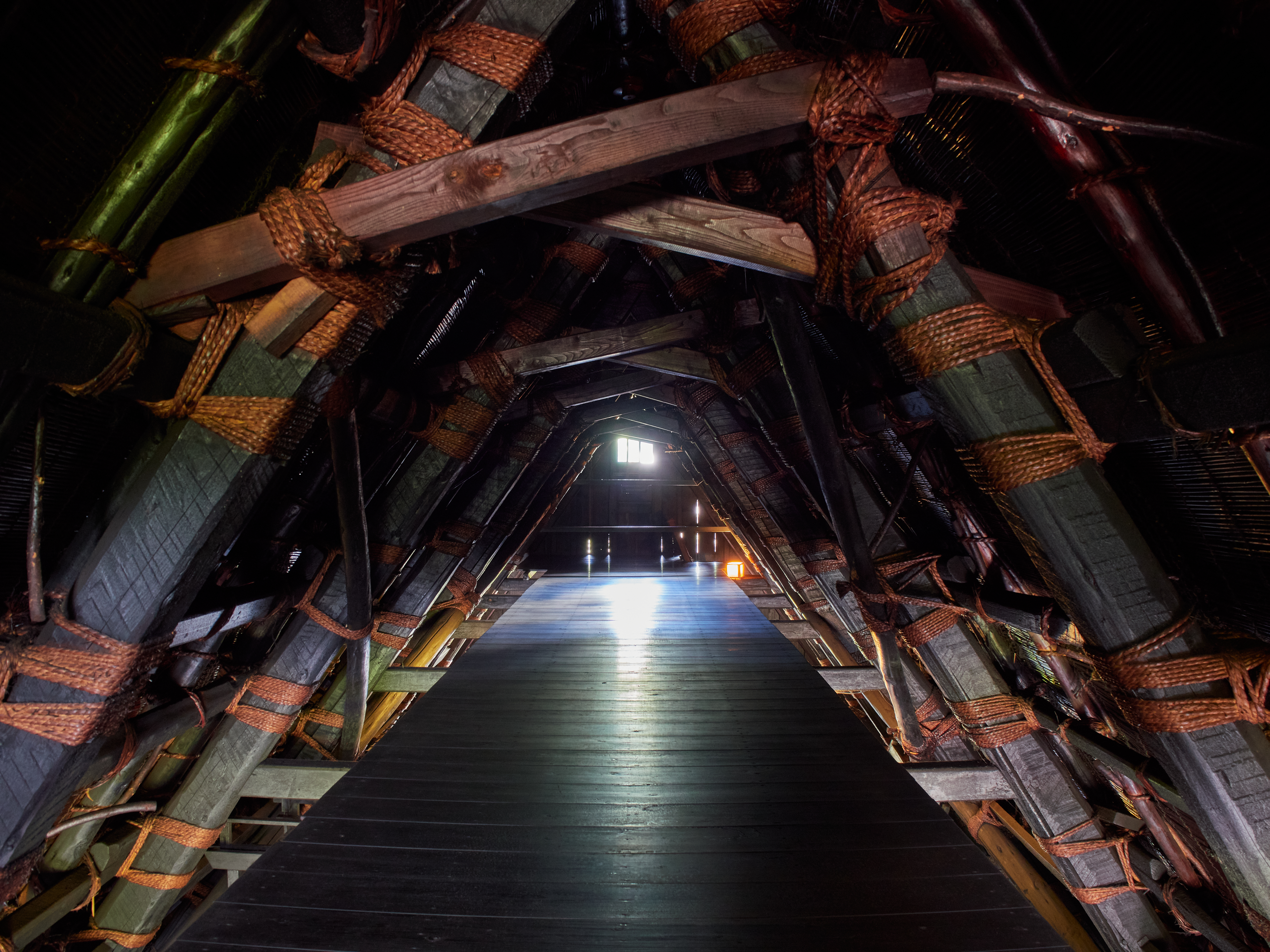
Interior of a traditional gassho-zukuri farmhouse, showing the steep thatched roof framework bound with rope.

== In popular culture ==
- The village of Hinamizawa in Higurashi When They Cry (ひぐらしのなく頃に; lit. When the Cicadas Cry), a popular Japanese murder mystery dōjin soft visual novel series, is heavily based on Shirakawa, with many local landmarks clearly recognizable. The series generated some "Seichi junrei tourism" in the area over the years.
- In Gosho Aoyama's Detective Conan manga series, Onizawa village from episodes 348–349, is modeled from real life Shirakawa.
- The final issue of Uncanny X-Force Vol. 1 opens with Wolverine visiting Shirakawa.
- The village of Minasato in the kemono visual novel Morenatsu (summer vacation) is based heavily off of Shirakawa.
- The Shirakawa village appears in the open world racing game Forza Horizon 6.

== Access ==
- Kaetsunō Bus Shirakawa-go Bus Terminal

World Heritage Site Bus is run by this company from Takaoka Station (Toyama) via Shin-Takaoka Station.

== See also ==
- Gokayama
- Historic Villages of Shirakawa-go and Gokayama
