= Kitayama Station (Ehime) =

Railway station in Ōzu, Ehime Prefecture, Japan

U12 Kitayama Station 喜多山駅
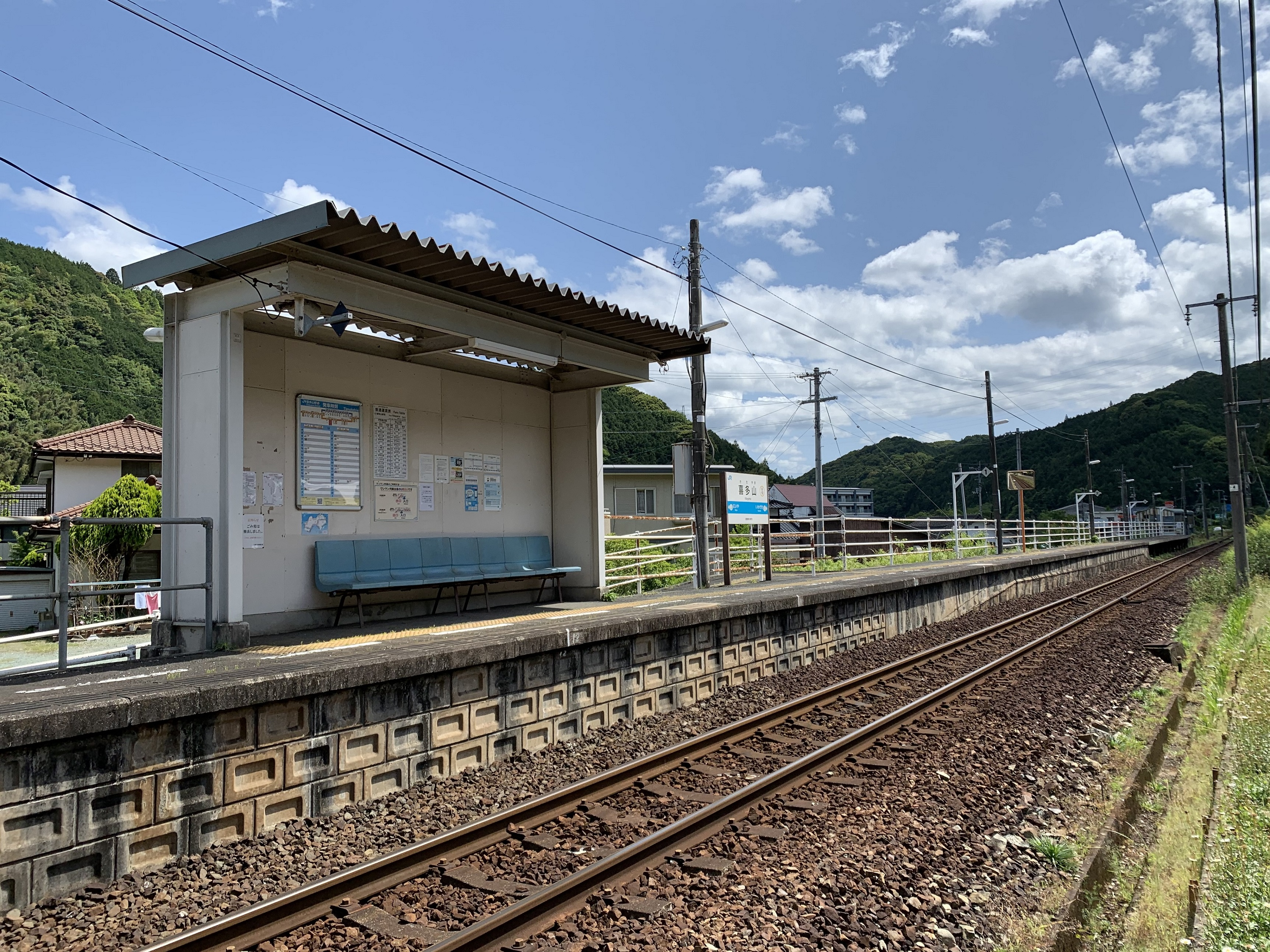
- Kitayama Station in May 2020

General information
- Location: Niiya, Ōzu, Ehime Prefecture 795-0069; Japan
- Coordinates: 33°32′00″N 132°36′40″E
- Operator: JR Shikoku
- Line: Yosan Line – (Uchiko Line)
- Distance: 236.1 km (146.7 mi) from Takamatsu
- Platforms: 1 side platform
- Tracks: 1

Construction
- Structure type: At grade
- Accessible: Yes - ramp leads up to platform

Other information
- Status: Unstaffed
- Station code: U12

History
- Opened: 1 May 1920; 106 years ago

Passengers
- FY2019: 14

Services
Preceding station	JR Shikoku	Following station
Niiya U13 towards Uwajima	Yosan Line (Uchiko Line)	Ikazaki U11 towards Takamatsu
Location
- Location within Ehime Prefecture Location within Japan

Kitayama Station (喜多山駅, Kitayama-eki) is a passenger railway station located in the city of Ōzu, Ehime Prefecture, Japan, Japan. It is operated by JR Shikoku and has the station number "U12".

== Lines ==
Although Kitayama Station is officially on the Uchiko Line, JR Shikoku runs it operationally as part of Yosan Line and as such it only carries the "U" prefix common to other Yosan line stations. It is located 236.1 km from the beginning of the Yosan line at Takamatsu. Only local trains stop at the station. Eastbound local trains which serve the station terminate at Matsuyama while westbound local trains terminate at Iyo-Ōzu or Yawatahama. Connections with other services are needed to travel further east of Matsuyama or further west of Iyo-Ōzu/Yawatahama on the line.

== Layout ==
The station consists of a side platform serving a single track. There is no station building, only a shelter on the platform for waiting passengers. A ramp leads up to the platform from the access road.

== History ==
The station was opened on 1 February 1920 as a station of the private Ehime Railway (愛媛鉄道, Ehime Tetsudō), a 762 mm (2 ft 6 in) light railway line from Wakamiya Junction (若宮連絡所, Wakamiya-renraku-sho), near Nagahama-machi (the present Iyo-Nagahama) to Uchiko. On October 1, 1933, the line was nationalized and Japanese Government Railways (JGR) took over and operated the station as part of the Ehime Line (愛媛線, Ehime-sen). On October 6, 1935, after the track had been re-gauged to 1,067 mm, the station became part of the Uchiko Line. Subsequently, Japanese National Railways (JNR), the successor of JGR, undertook the construction of the Uchiko branch of the Yosan Line which involved building a new stretch of track from Mukaibara to Uchiko. The station became part of this branch on 3 March 1986. It was still designated as a station on the Uchiko Line but was now operated as part of the Yosan Line. With the privatization of JNR on 1 April 1987, control of the station passed to JR Shikoku.

== Surrounding area ==
- Japan National Route 56

== See also ==
- List of railway stations in Japan
