= Iyo-Nakayama Station =

Railway station in Iyo, Ehime Prefecture, Japan

U08 Iyo-Nakayama Station 伊予中山駅
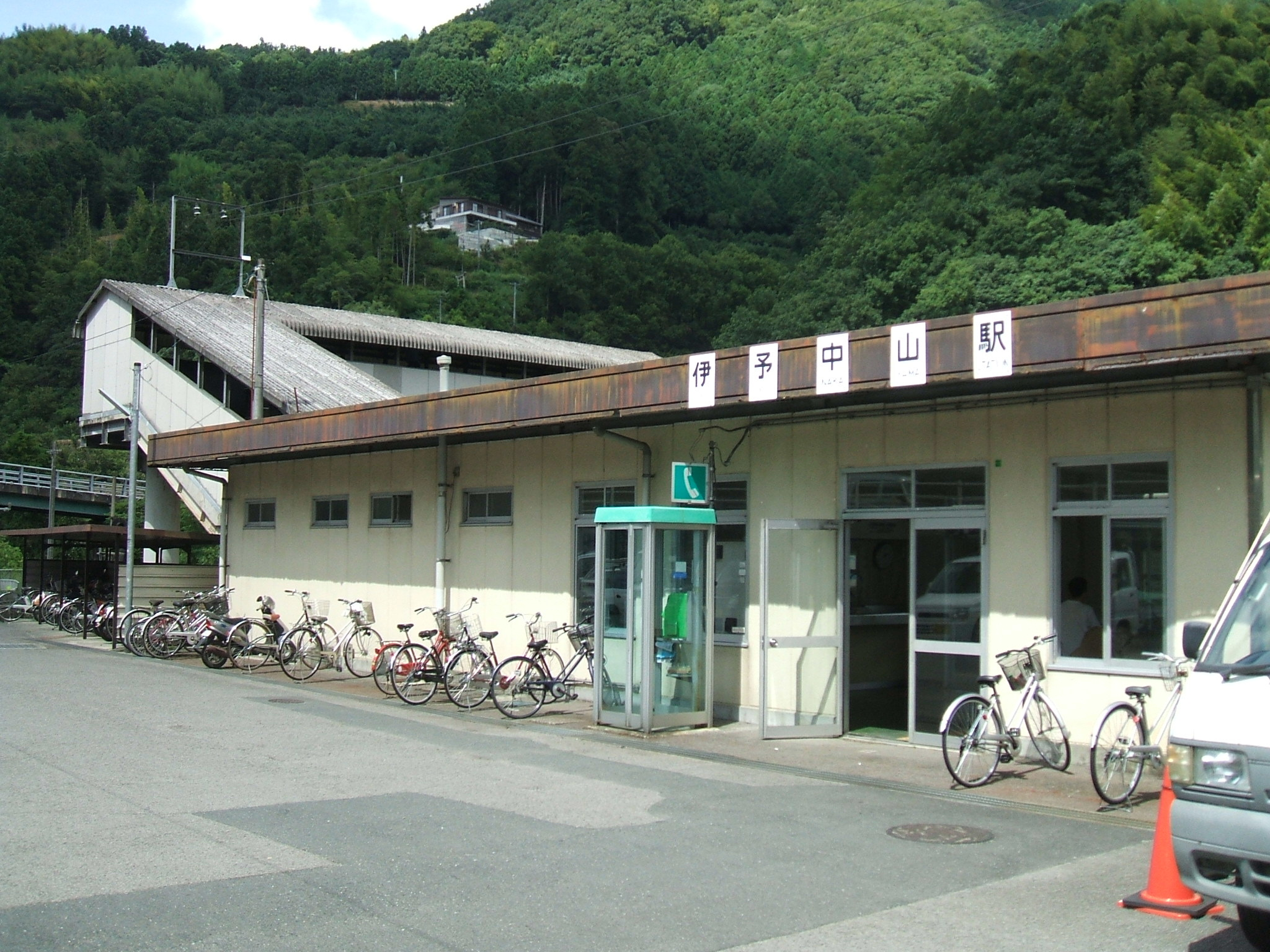
- Iyo-Nakayama Station in 2008

General information
- Location: Nakayamacho Nakayama, Iyo City, Ehime Prefecture 791-3206; Japan
- Coordinates: 33°39′00″N 132°42′41″E
- Operator: JR Shikoku
- Line: Yosan Line
- Distance: 218.7 km (135.9 mi) from Takamatsu
- Platforms: 2 side platforms
- Tracks: 2 + 1 siding

Construction
- Structure type: At grade
- Accessible: No - platforms linked by footbridge

Other information
- Status: Unstaffed
- Station code: U08

History
- Opened: 3 March 1986; 40 years ago

Passengers
- FY2019: 208

Services
Preceding station	JR Shikoku	Following station
Iyo-Tachikawa U09 towards Uwajima	Yosan Line	Iyo-Ōhira U07 towards Takamatsu
Location
- Location within Ehime Prefecture Location within Japan

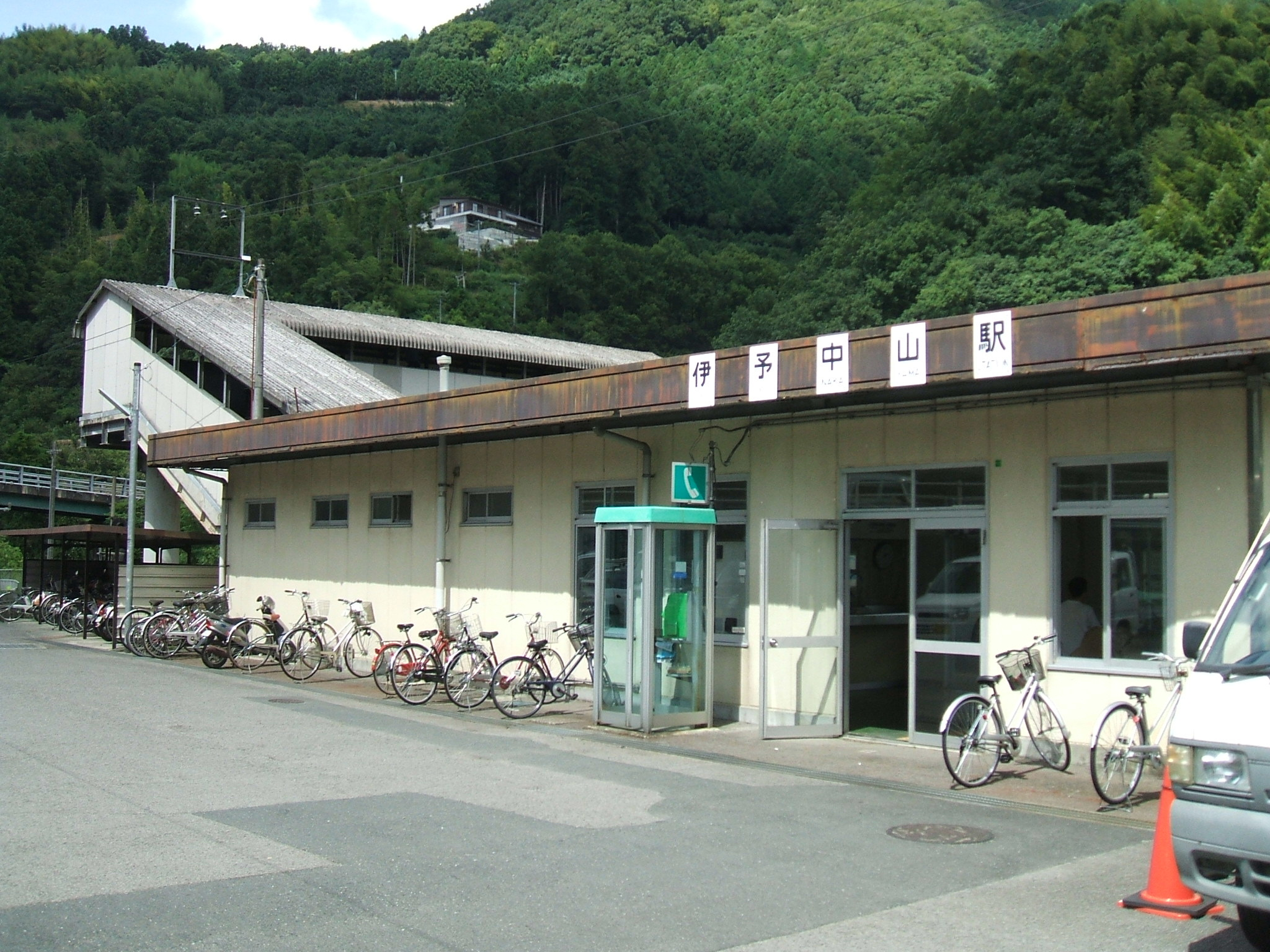
Station building

Iyo-Nakayama Station (伊予中山駅, Iyo-Nakayama-eki) is a passenger railway station located in the city of Iyo, Ehime Prefecture, Japan. It is operated by JR Shikoku and has the station number "U08".

== Lines ==
The station is served by the JR Shikoku Uchiko-branch of the Yosan Line and is located 218.7 km from the beginning of the line at Takamatsu. Eastbound local trains which serve the station terminate at Matsuyama. Connections with other services are needed to travel further east of Matsuyama on the line.

Some Uwakai limited express trains, which run between Matsuyama and Uwajima, stop at this station.

== Layout ==
The station consists of two opposed side platforms serving two tracks. A station building serves as a waiting room. Access to the opposite platform is by means of a footbridge. The station is unstaffed but a kan'i itaku agent located outside the station sells some types of tickets.

== Adjacent stations ==
«	Service	»
JR Limited Express Services
Iyoshi	Uwakai	Uchiko

== History ==
Iyo-Nakayama Station was opened by Japanese National Railways (JNR) on 3 March 1986. It was among a string of three intermediate stations which were set up during the construction of a new stretch of track to link Mukaibara with the Uchiko Line at Uchiko, to create what would later become the Uchiko branch of the Yosan Line. With the privatization of JNR on 1 April 1987, control of the station passed to JR Shikoku.

== Surrounding area ==
- Japan National Route 56

== See also ==
- List of railway stations in Japan
