= Iyo-Tachikawa Station =

Railway station in Uchiko, Ehime Prefecture, Japan

U09 Iyo-Tachikawa Station 伊予立川駅
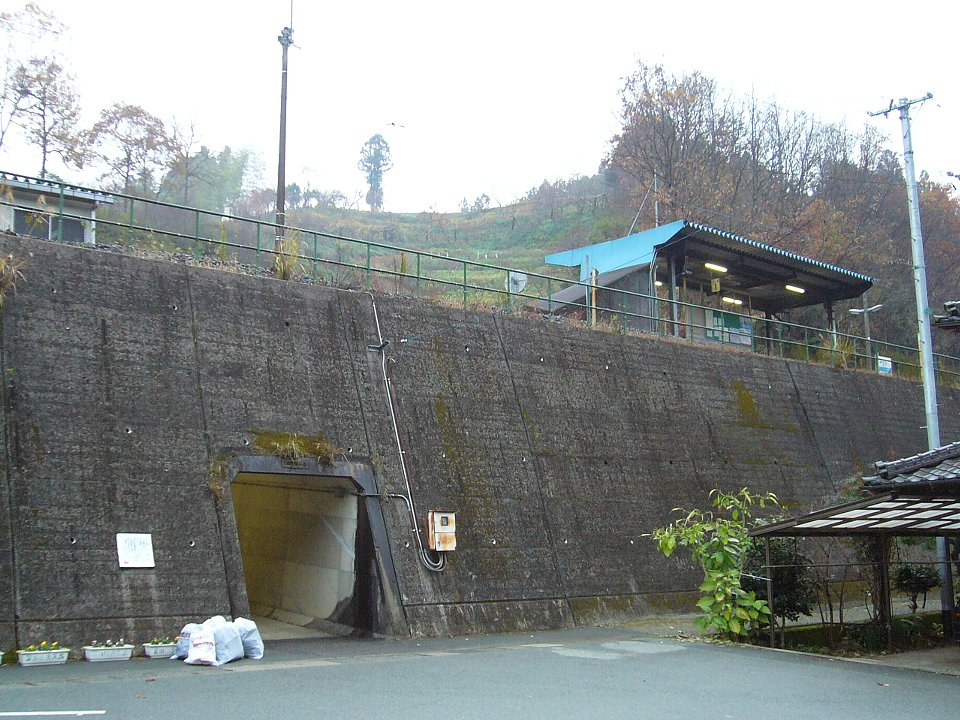
- Iyo-Tachikawa Station, December 2006

General information
- Location: Tachiyama, Uchiko Town, Kita District; Ehime Prefecture 791-3331; Japan
- Coordinates: 33°36′02″N 132°40′37″E
- Operator: JR Shikoku
- Line: Yosan Line
- Distance: 225.4 km (140.1 mi) from Takamatsu
- Platforms: 1 island platform
- Tracks: 2 + 1 siding

Construction
- Structure type: Elevated
- Cycle facilities: Bike shed

Other information
- Status: Unstaffed
- Station code: U09

History
- Opened: 3 March 1986; 40 years ago

Passengers
- FY2019: 48

Services
Preceding station	JR Shikoku	Following station
Uchiko U10 towards Uwajima	Yosan Line	Iyo-Nakayama U08 towards Takamatsu
Location
- Location within Ehime Prefecture Location within Japan

Iyo-Tachikawa Station (伊予立川駅, Iyo-Tachikawa-eki) is a passenger railway station located in the town of Uchiko, Kita District, Ehime Prefecture, Japan. It is operated by JR Shikoku and has the station number "U09".

== Lines ==
The station is served by the Uchiko branch line of the Yosan Line and is located 225.4 km from the beginning of the line at Takamatsu. Only local trains serve the station. Eastbound local trains terminate at Matsuyama. Connections with other services are needed to travel further east of Matsuyama on the line.

== Layout ==
Iyo-Tachikawa Statio, which is unstaffed, consists of an island platform serving two elevated tracks. There is no station building, only a shelter on the platform for waiting passengers. Access to the island platform is by means of a tunnel under the elevated structure leading to a flight of steps. A bike shed is provided at the base of the elevated structure.

== History ==
Iyo-Tachikawa Statio was opened by Japanese National Railways (JNR) on 3 March 1986. It was among a string of three intermediate stations which were set up during the construction of a new stretch of track to link Mukaibara with the Uchiko Line at Uchiko, to create what would later become the Uchiko branch of the Yosan Line. With the privatization of JNR on 1 April 1987, control of the station passed to JR Shikoku.

== Surrounding area ==
- Japan National Route 56
- Uchiko Municipal Tachikawa Elementary School

== See also ==
- List of railway stations in Japan
