= Niiya Station =

Railway station in Ōzu, Ehime Prefecture, Japan

U13 Niiya Station 新谷駅
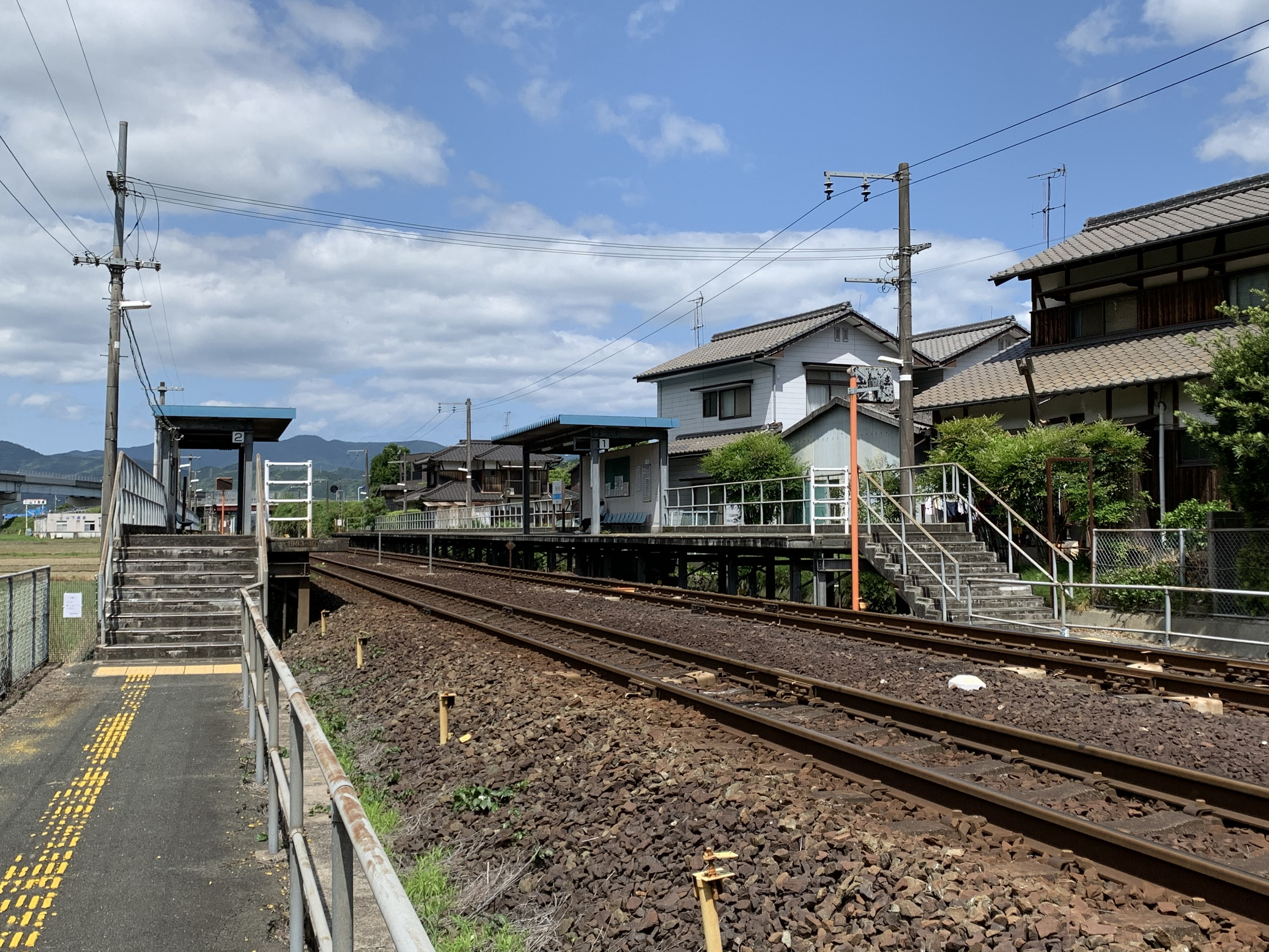
- Niiya Station, May 2020

General information
- Location: Niiya, Ōzu Cityi, Ehime Prefecture 795-0069; Japan
- Coordinates: 33°32′02″N 132°36′01″E
- Operator: JR Shikoku
- Line: Yosan Line – (Uchiko Line)
- Distance: 237.3 km (147.5 mi) from Takamatsu
- Platforms: 2 side platforms
- Tracks: 2

Construction
- Structure type: At grade
- Accessible: No - steps lead up to platforms

Other information
- Status: Unstaffed
- Station code: U13

History
- Opened: 1 May 1920; 106 years ago

Passengers
- FY2019: 200

Services
Preceding station	JR Shikoku	Following station
Iyo-Ōzu U14 S18 towards Uwajima	Yosan Line (Uchiko Line)	Kitayama U12 towards Takamatsu
Location
- Location within Ehime Prefecture Location within Japan

Niiya Station (新谷駅, Niiya-eki) is a passenger railway station located in the city of Ōzu, Ehime Prefecture, Japan. It is operated by JR Shikoku and has the station number "U13".

== Lines ==
Although Niiya Station is officially on the Uchiko Line, JR Shikoku runs it operationally as part of Yosan Line and as such it only carries the "U" prefix common to other Yosan line stations. It is located 237.3 km from the beginning of the Yosan line at Takamatsu. Only local trains stop at the station. Eastbound local trains which serve the station terminate at Matsuyama while westbound local trains terminate at Iyo-Ōzu or Yawatahama. Connections with other services are needed to travel further east of Matsuyama or further west of Iyo-Ōzu/Yawatahama on the line.

== Layout ==
The station consists of two opposed side platforms serving two tracks. There is no station building but both platforms have shelters for waiting passengers. Steps lead up to the platforms from access roads on either side. There is no means to cross from one platform to the other within the station premises. A road level crossing some distance away must be used.

== History ==
The station was opened on 1 February 1920 as a station of the private Ehime Railway (愛媛鉄道, Ehime Tetsudō), a 762 mm (2 ft 6 in) light railway line from Wakamiya Junction (若宮連絡所, Wakamiya-renraku-sho), near Nagahama-machi (the present Iyo-Nagahama) to Uchiko. On October 1, 1933, the line was nationalized and Japanese Government Railways (JGR) took over and operated the station as part of the Ehime Line (愛媛線, Ehime-sen). On October 6, 1935, after the track had been re-gauged to 1,067 mm, the station became part of the Uchiko Line. Subsequently, Japanese National Railways (JNR), the successor of JGR, undertook the construction of the Uchiko branch of the Yosan Line which involved building a new stretch of track from Mukaibara to Uchiko. The track at Niiya was re-aligned and the position of the station moved. The new station reopened on 3 March 1986. It was still designated as a station on the Uchiko Line but was now operated as part of the Yosan Line. With the privatization of JNR on 1 April 1987, control of the station passed to JR Shikoku.

== Surrounding area ==
- Teikyo Fifth High School
- Ozu Municipal Niiya Junior High School
- Ozu Municipal Niiya Elementary School (Niiya Jin'ya)

== See also ==
- List of railway stations in Japan
