= Iyo-Ōhira Station =

Railway station in Iyo, Ehime Prefecture, Japan

U07 Iyo-Ōhira Station 伊予大平駅
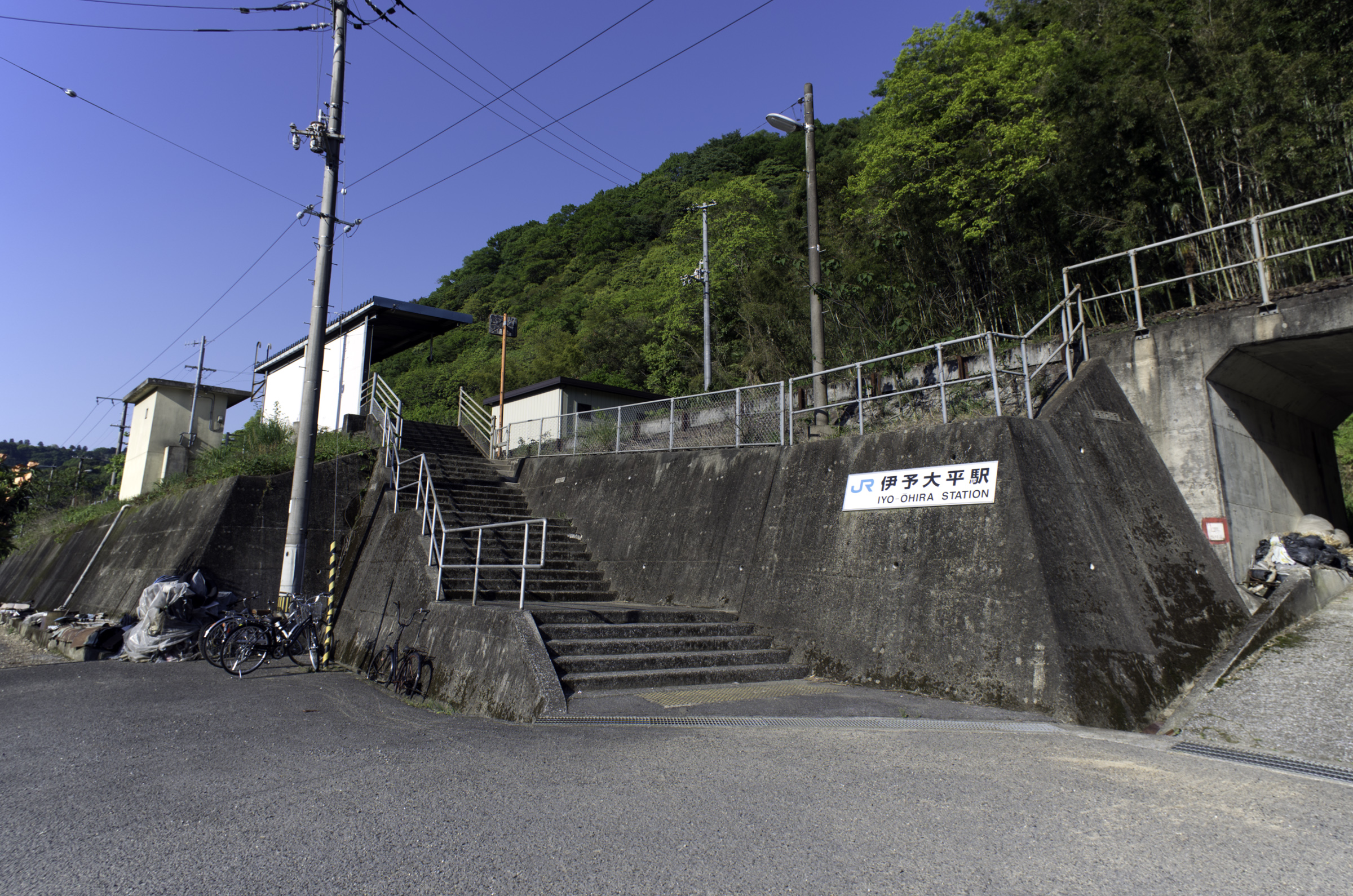
- Iyo-Ōhira Station in 2013

General information
- Location: Ohira, Iyo City, Ehime Prefecture 799-3131; Japan
- Coordinates: 33°42′58″N 132°42′31″E
- Operator: JR Shikoku
- Line: Yosan Line
- Distance: 211.3 km (131.3 mi) from Takamatsu
- Platforms: 1 side platform
- Tracks: 1

Construction
- Structure type: Embankment
- Accessible: No - steps lead up to platform

Other information
- Status: Unstaffed
- Station code: U07

History
- Opened: 3 March 1986; 40 years ago

Passengers
- FY2019: 30

Services
Preceding station	JR Shikoku	Following station
Iyo-Nakayama U08 towards Uwajima	Yosan Line	Mukaibara U06 S06 towards Takamatsu
Location
- Location within Ehime Prefecture Location within Japan

Iyo-Ōhira Station (伊予大平駅, Iyo-Ōhira-eki) is a passenger railway station located in the city of Iyo, Ehime Prefecture, Japan. It is operated by JR Shikoku and has the station number "U07".

== Lines ==
The station is served by the JR Shikoku Uchiko-branch of the Yosan Line and is located 211.3 km from the beginning of the line at Takamatsu. Only local trains serve the station. Eastbound local trains terminate at Matsuyama. Connections with other services are needed to travel further east of Matsuyama on the line.

== Layout ==
The station, which is unstaffed, consists of a side platform serving a single track on an embankment. There is no station building, only a shelter for waiting passengers. A flight of steps leads up to the platform from the access road, rendering the station wheelchair inaccessible.

After the station, the track goes through the Inuyose Tunnel (犬寄トンネル, Inuyose ton'neru), which, at 6012 m, is the longest railway tunnel in Shikoku.

== History ==
Iyo-Ōhira Station was opened by Japanese National Railways (JNR) on 3 March 1986. It was among a string of three intermediate stations which were set up during the construction of a new stretch of track to link Mukaibara with the Uchiko Line at Uchiko, to create what would later become the Uchiko branch of the Yosan Line. With the privatization of JNR on 1 April 1987, control of the station passed to JR Shikoku.

== Surrounding area ==
- Japan National Route 56
- Iyo City Minamiyamazaki Elementary School

== See also ==
- List of railway stations in Japan
