= Kita-Iyo Station =

Railway station in Masaki, Ehime Prefecture, Japan

U02 Kita-Iyo Station 北伊予駅
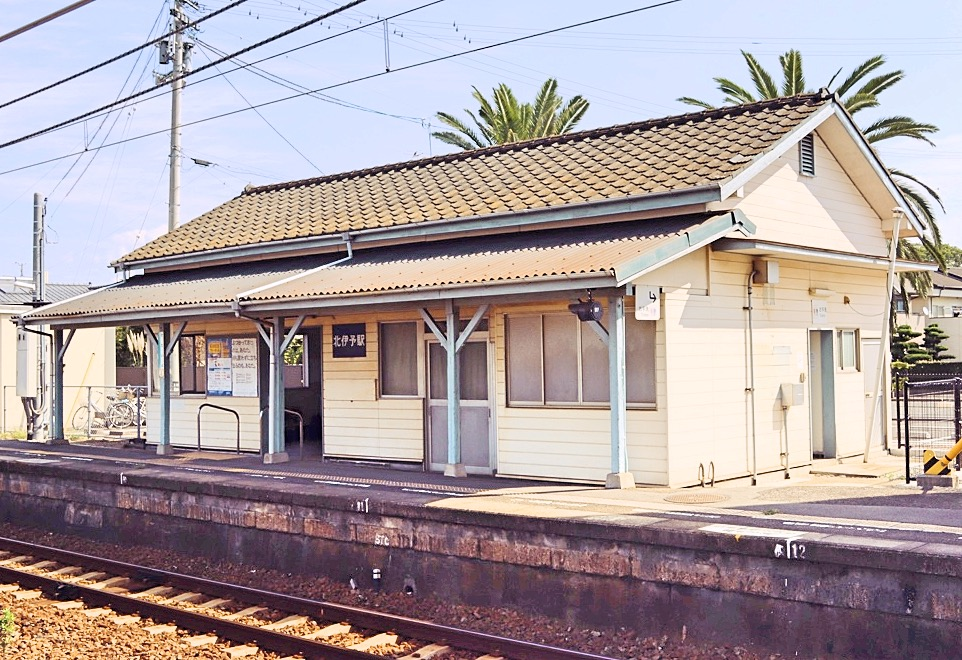
- Kita-Iyo Station

General information
- Location: Kanzaki, Masaki Town, Iyo District, Ehime Prefecture 791-3161; Japan
- Coordinates: 33°47′14″N 132°44′56″E
- Operator: JR Shikoku
- Line: Yosan Line
- Distance: 200.3 km (124.5 mi) from Takamatsu
- Platforms: 2 side platforms
- Tracks: 2 + 2 sidings

Construction
- Structure type: At grade
- Parking: Available
- Accessible: No - platforms linked by footbridge

Other information
- Status: Unstaffed
- Station code: U02

History
- Opened: 27 February 1930; 96 years ago

Passengers
- FY2019: 471

Services
Preceding station	JR Shikoku	Following station
Minami-Iyo U02-1 towards Uwajima	Yosan Line	Ichitsubo U01 towards Takamatsu
Location
- Location within Ehime Prefecture Location within Japan

Kita-Iyo Station (北伊予駅, Kita-Iyo-eki) is a passenger railway station located in the town of Masaki, Iyo District, Ehime Prefecture, Japan. It is operated by JR Shikoku and has the station number "U02".

== Lines ==
Kita-Iyo Station is served by the JR Shikoku Yosan Line and is located 200.3 km from the beginning of the line at Takamatsu. Only Yosan Line local trains stop at the station and these ply the sectors Matsuyama - Iyo-Ōzu via Iyo-Nagahama or Matsuyama - Uwajima via the Uchiko branch. Connections with other services are needed to travel further east of Matsuyama.

== Layout ==
The station consists of two staggered opposed side platforms serving two tracks. Line 1, served by platform 1 on the side of the station building, is a through track while line 2 is a passing loop. The station building is unstaffed and houses a waiting room and an automatic ticket vending machine. Access to platform 2 is by means of a footbridge. Two sidings branch off line 1 and end near the station building.

== History ==
Kita-Iyo Station opened on 27 February 1930 as an intermediate stop when the then Sanyo Line was extended from Matsuyama to Iyoshi. At that time the station was operated by Japanese Government Railways, later becoming Japanese National Railways (JNR). With the privatization of JNR on 1 April 1987, control of the station passed to JR Shikoku.

== Surrounding area ==
- Masaki Municipal Kita-Iyo Elementary School
- Masaki Municipal Kita-Iyo Junior High School

== See also ==
- List of railway stations in Japan
