= Ikazaki Station =

Railway station in Uchiko, Ehime Prefecture, Japan

U11 Ikazaki Station 五十崎駅
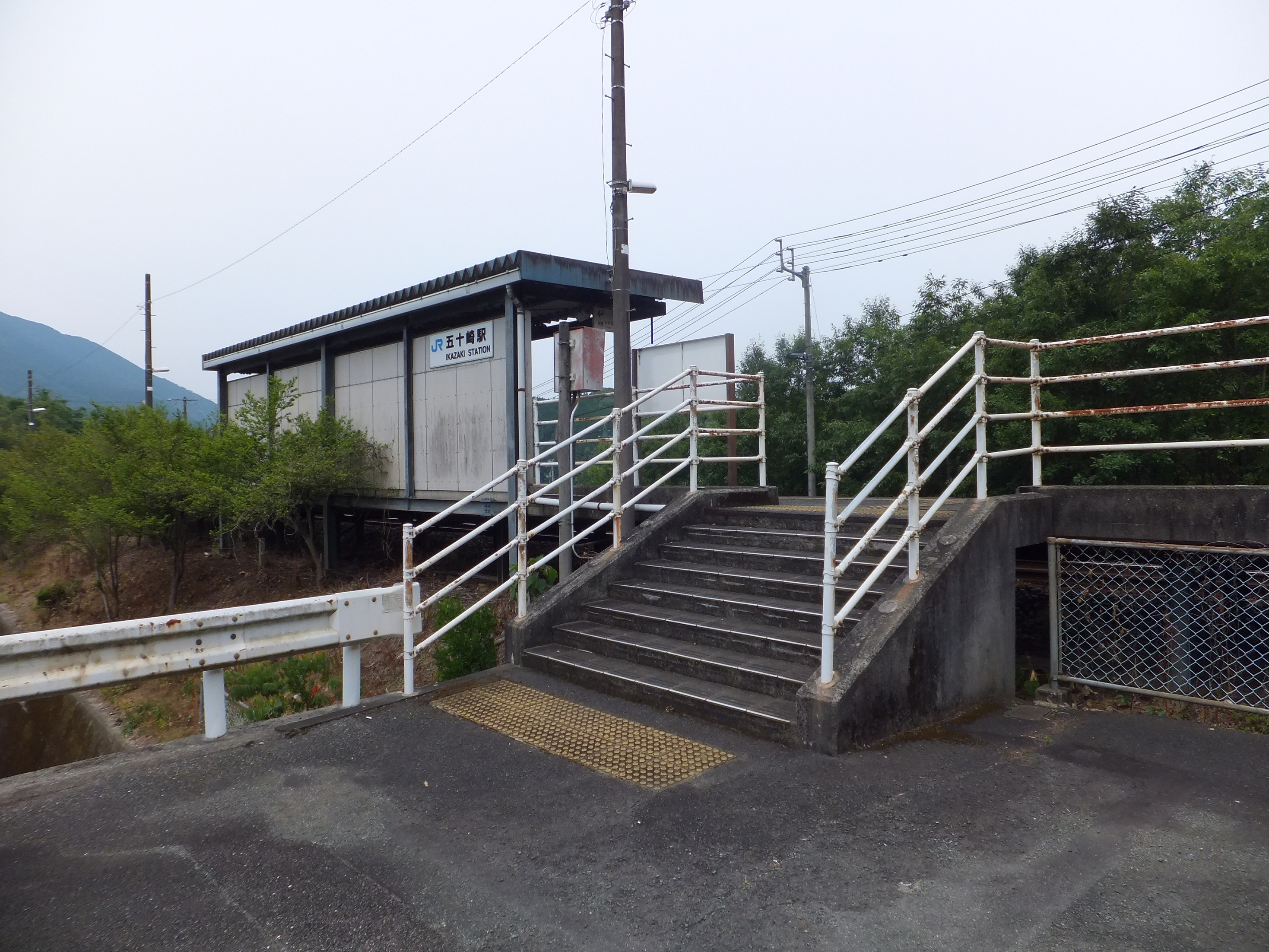
- Ikazaki Station, May 2020

General information
- Location: Ikazaki, Uchiko Town, Kita District; Ehime Prefecture 795-0301; Japan
- Coordinates: 33°32′16″N 132°38′10″E
- Operator: JR Shikoku
- Line: Yosan Line – (Uchiko Line)
- Distance: 233.6 km (145.2 mi) from Takamatsu
- Platforms: 1 side platform
- Tracks: 1 + 1 siding

Construction
- Structure type: At grade
- Cycle facilities: Bike shed
- Accessible: No - steps lead up to platform

Other information
- Status: Unstaffed
- Station code: U11

History
- Opened: 1 May 1920; 106 years ago

Passengers
- FY2019: 10

Services
Preceding station	JR Shikoku	Following station
Kitayama U12 towards Uwajima	Yosan Line (Uchiko Line)	Uchiko U10 towards Takamatsu
Location
- Location within Ehime Prefecture Location within Japan

Ikazaki Station (五十崎駅, Ikazaki-eki) is a passenger railway station in the town of Uchiko, Kita District, Ehime Prefecture, Japan. It is operated by JR Shikoku and has the station number "U11".

== Lines ==
Although the station is officially on the Uchiko Line, JR Shikoku runs it operationally as part of Yosan Line and as such it only carries the "U" prefix common to other Yosan line stations. It is located 233.6 km from the beginning of the Yosan line at Takamatsu. Only local trains stop at the station. Eastbound local trains which serve the station terminate at Matsuyama while westbound local trains terminate at Iyo-Ōzu or Yawatahama. Connections with other services are needed to travel further east of Matsuyama or further west of Iyo-Ōzu/Yawatahama on the line.

== Layout ==
Ikazaki Station consists of a side platform serving a single track. There is no station building, only a shelter on the platform for waiting passengers. A short flight of steps leads to the platform from the access road. There is limited parking and a bike shed near the base of the steps. A siding branches off the track at the station. One unique feature of the station is the position of the platform: some 20 m of it lies inside the Ikazaki Tunnel (1,106 m long) in the direction of Uchiko.

== History ==
Ikazaki Station was opened on 1 February 1920 as a station of the private Ehime Railway (愛媛鉄道, Ehime Tetsudō), a 762 mm (2 ft 6 in) light railway line from Wakamiya Junction (若宮連絡所, Wakamiya-renraku-sho), near Nagahama-machi (the present Iyo-Nagahama) to Uchiko. On October 1, 1933, the line was nationalized and Japanese Government Railways (JGR) operated the station as part of the Ehime Line (愛媛線, Ehime-sen). On October 6, 1935, after the track had been re-gauged to 1,067 mm, the station became part of the Uchiko Line. Subsequently, Japanese National Railways (JNR), the successor of JGR, undertook the construction of the Uchiko branch of the Yosan Line which involved building a new stretch of track from Mukaibara to Uchiko. The track at Ikazaki was re-aligned and the position of the station moved. The new station reopened on 3 March 1986. It was still designated as a station on the Uchiko Line but was now operated as part of the Yosan Line. With the privatization of JNR on 1 April 1987, control of the station passed to JR Shikoku.

== Surrounding area ==
- Japan National Route 56

== See also ==
- List of railway stations in Japan
