= Ichitsubo Station =

Railway station in Matsuyama, Ehime Prefecture, Japan

U01 Ichitsubo Station 市坪駅
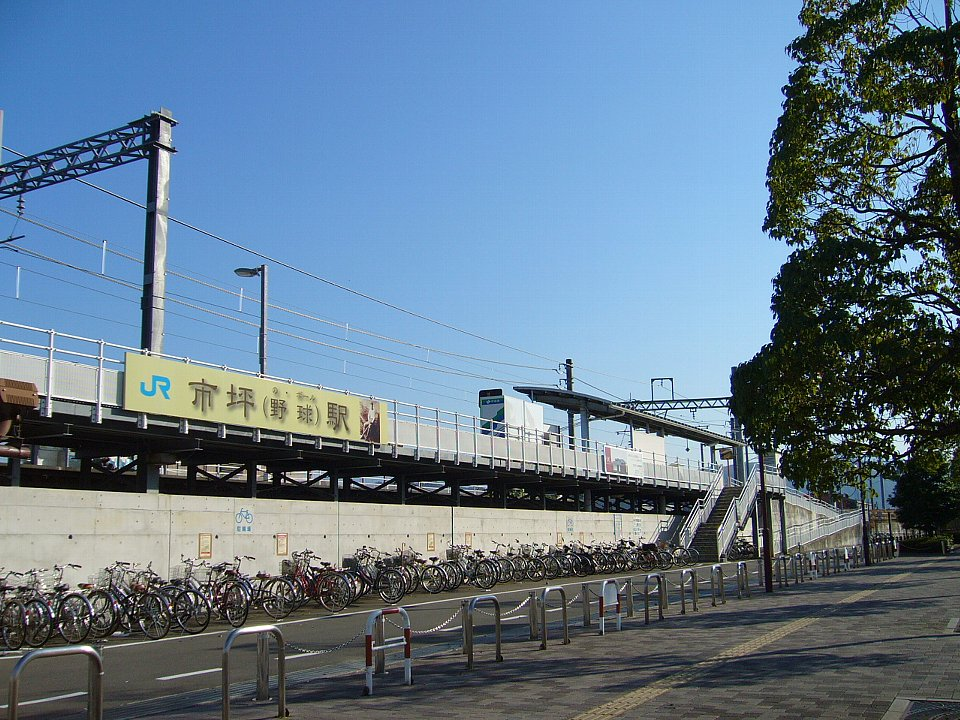
- Ichitsubo Station

General information
- Location: Ichitsubo Nishimachi, Matsuyama City, Ehime Prefecture 790-0948; Japan
- Coordinates: 33°48′32″N 132°44′57″E
- Operator: JR Shikoku
- Line: Yosan Line
- Distance: 197.9 km (123.0 mi) from Takamatsu
- Platforms: 2 side platforms
- Tracks: 2

Construction
- Structure type: Embankment
- Parking: Designated parking lots for bicycles
- Accessible: Yes - ramps lead up to platforms

Other information
- Status: Unstaffed
- Station code: U01

History
- Opened: 1 October 1964; 61 years ago

Passengers
- FY2019: 494

Services
Preceding station	JR Shikoku	Following station
Kita-Iyo U02 towards Uwajima	Yosan Line	Matsuyama U00 Y55 towards Takamatsu
Location
- Location within Ehime Prefecture Location within Japan

Ichitsubo Station (市坪駅, Ichitsubo-eki) is a passenger railway station located in the city of Matsuyama, Ehime Prefecture, Japan. It is operated by JR Shikoku and has the station number "U01". The station is also called No-Ball Station (野球（の・ボール）駅) named after Noboru (升), the name of haiku poet, Masaoka Shiki, who spent his childhood in Matsuyama.

== Lines ==
Ichitsubo Station is served by the JR Shikoku Yosan Line and is located 197.9 km from the beginning of the line at Takamatsu.

== Layout ==
The station, which is unstaffed, consists of two opposed side platforms serving two tracks on an embankment. Line 1 on the east side is the through track while line 2 is the passing loop. There is no station building but both platforms have weather shelters and also "tickets corners" which are small shelters housing automatic ticket vending machines. each platform has its own flight of steps and ramp leading down to the access road. An underpass under the embankment is used to cross from one platform to the other. Designated parking lots for bicycles are provided on the west (Botchan Stadium) side of the station. A siding branches off track 2.

=== Platforms ===
1	Yosan Line	for Iyoshi, Uchiko, Iyo-Nagahama, Iyo-Ōzu, Yawatahama, and Uwajima
2	Yosan Line	for Matsuyama, Iyo-Hōjō, Imabari, and Iyo-Saijō

== History ==
Japanese National Railways (JNR) opened Ichitsubo Station on 1 October 1964 on the existing Yosan Line. With the privatization of JNR on 1 April 1987, control of the station passed to JR Shikoku.

== Surrounding area ==
- Matsuyama Central Park
  - Baseball stadium (Botchan Stadium)
  - Sub-stadium (Madonna Stadium)
  - Sports field
  - Sports arena
  - Tennis court
  - Pool (Aqua Pallet Matsuyama)
  - Matsuyama Keirin Track
  - Ehimeken Budokan
- Ehime Prefectural Matsuyama Central Senior High School
- Iyozu Hikonomito Shrine (Tsubaki Shrine)

== See also ==
- List of railway stations in Japan
