= Iyo-Yokota Station =

Railway station in Masaki, Ehime Prefecture, Japan

U03 Iyo-Yokota Station 伊予横田駅
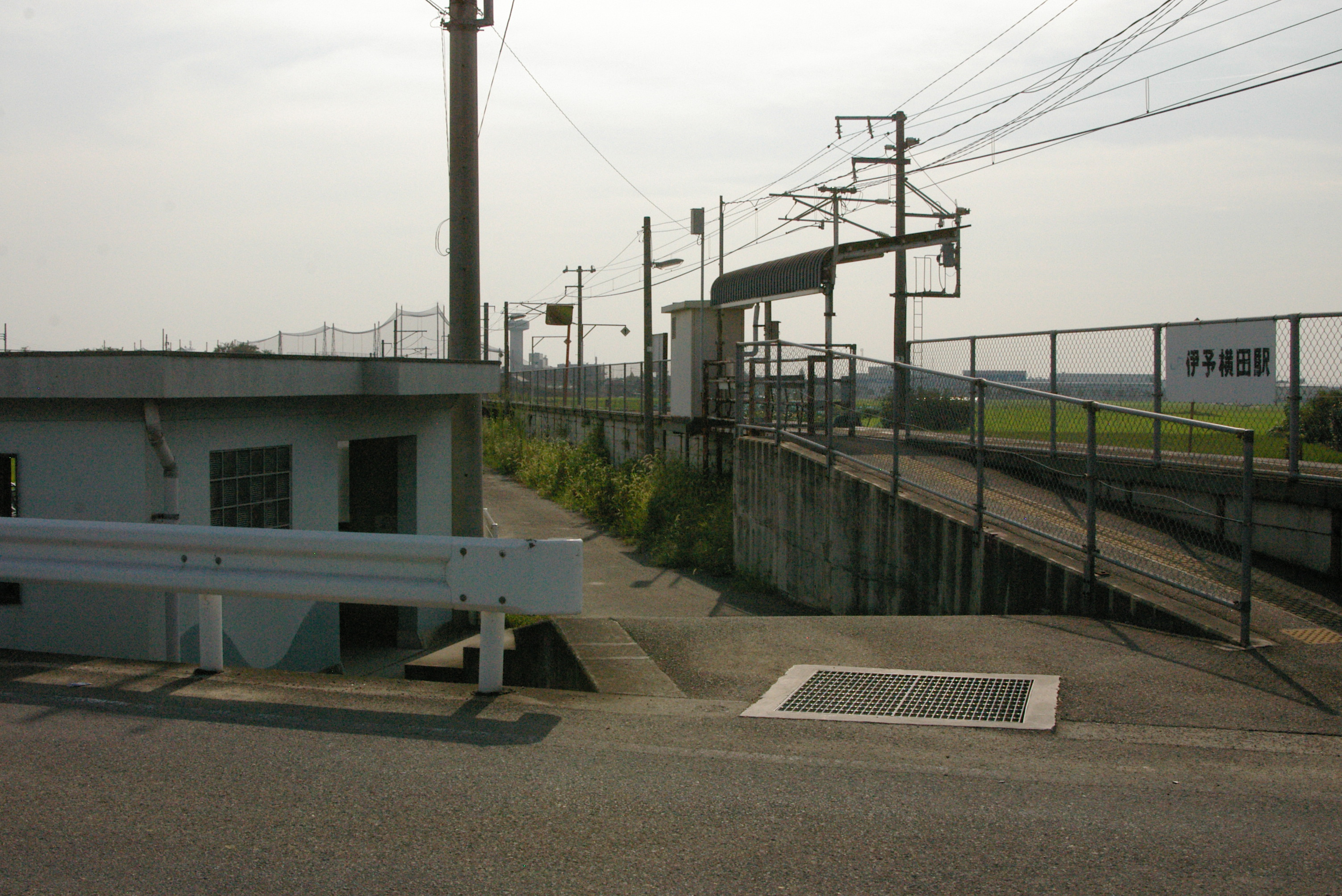
- Iyo-Yokota Station in 2008

General information
- Location: Yokota, Masaki Town, Iyo District, Ehime Prefecture 791-3154; Japan
- Coordinates: 33°46′22″N 132°43′38″E
- Operator: JR Shikoku
- Line: Yosan Line
- Distance: 203.0 km (126.1 mi) from Takamatsu
- Platforms: 1 side platform
- Tracks: 1

Construction
- Structure type: At grade
- Cycle facilities: Designated parking area for bicycles
- Accessible: Yes - ramp to platform

Other information
- Status: Unstaffed
- Station code: U03

History
- Opened: 15 April 1961; 65 years ago

Passengers
- FY2019: 210

Services
Preceding station	JR Shikoku	Following station
Torinoki U04 towards Uwajima	Yosan Line	Minami-Iyo U02-1 towards Takamatsu
Location
- Location within Ehime Prefecture Location within Japan

Iyo-Yokota Station (伊予横田駅, Iyo-Yokota-eki) is a passenger railway station located in the town of Masaki, Iyo District, Ehime Prefecture, Japan. It is operated by JR Shikoku and has the station number "U03".

== Lines ==
Iyo-Yokota Station is served by the JR Shikoku Yosan Line and is located 203.0 km from the beginning of the line at Takamatsu. Only Yosan Line local trains stop at the station and these ply the sectors Matsuyama - Iyo-Ōzu via Iyo-Nagahama or Matsuyama - Uwajima via the Uchiko branch. Connections with other services are needed to travel further east of Matsuyama.

== Layout ==
The station consists of a side platform serving a single track. The platform is equipped with a weather shelter and a "tickets corner", a small shelter housing an automatic ticket vending machine. A ramp leads up to the platform from the access road. Near the base of the ramp, a waiting room has been set up and there is a designated parking area for bicycles.

== History ==
Japanese National Railways (JNR) opened the station as a new stop on the existing Yosan Line on 15 April 1961. With the privatization of JNR on 1 April 1987, control of the station passed to JR Shikoku.

== Surrounding area ==
The surrounding area is a rural area. Although it is located in Masaki, it is close to the border with Iyo City, and more people use it from the Shimomiya district of Iyo, which has a large population.

== See also ==
- List of railway stations in Japan
