= Torinoki Station =

Railway station in Iyo, Ehime Prefecture, Japan

U04 Torinoki Station 鳥ノ木駅
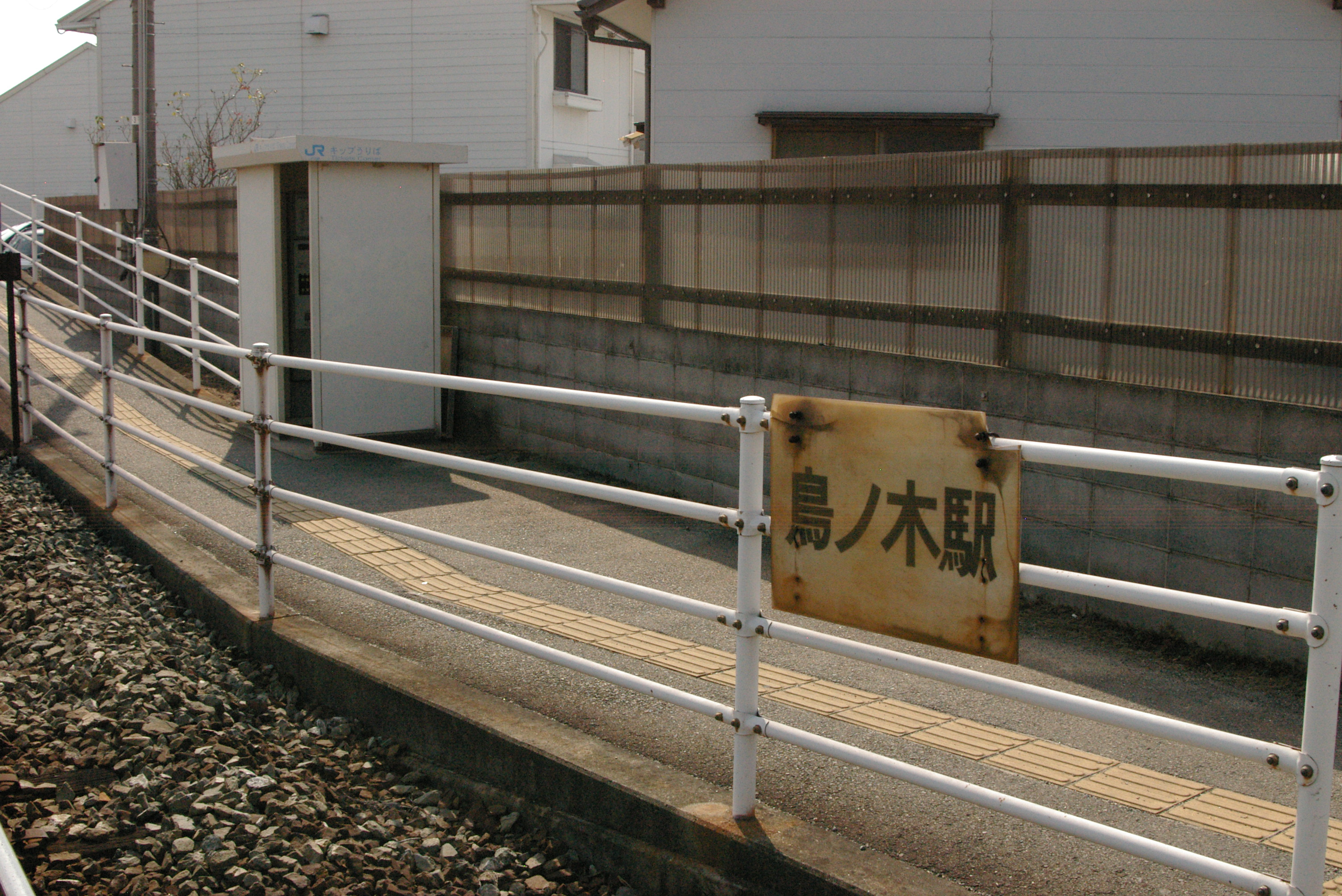
- Torinoki Station entrance, August 2008

General information
- Location: Shimoagawa, Iyo City, Ehime Prefecture 799-3111; Japan
- Coordinates: 33°45′49″N 132°42′40″E
- Operator: JR Shikoku
- Line: Yosan Line
- Distance: 204.8 km (127.3 mi) from Takamatsu
- Platforms: 1 side platform
- Tracks: 1

Construction
- Structure type: At grade
- Cycle facilities: Bike shed
- Accessible: Yes - ramp to platform

Other information
- Status: Unstaffed
- Station code: U04

History
- Opened: 1 November 1986; 39 years ago

Passengers
- FY2019: 356

Services
Preceding station	JR Shikoku	Following station
Iyoshi U05 towards Uwajima	Yosan Line	Iyo-Yokota U03 towards Takamatsu
Location
- Location within Ehime Prefecture Location within Japan

Torinoki Station (鳥ノ木駅, Torinoki-eki) is a passenger railway station located in the city of Iyo, Ehime Prefecture, Japan. It is operated by JR Shikoku and has the station number "U04".

== Lines ==
Torinoki Station is served by the JR Shikoku Yosan Line and is located 204.8 km from the beginning of the line at Takamatsu. Only Yosan Line local trains stop at the station and these ply the sectors Matsuyama - Iyo-Ōzu via Iyo-Nagahama or Matsuyama - Uwajima via the Uchiko branch. Connections with other services are needed to travel further east of Matsuyama.

== Layout ==
The station consists of a side platform serving a single track. There is no station building, only a simple shelter for waiting passengers. A "tickets corner" (a small shelter housing an automatic ticket vending machine) is placed on the ramp which leads to the platform from the access road. A bicycle shed has been erected near the base of the ramp.

== History ==
Japanese National Railways (JNR) opened the station as a new stop on the existing Yosan Line on 1 November 1986. With the privatization of JNR on 1 April 1987, control of the station passed to JR Shikoku.

== Surrounding area ==
- Japan National Route 56
- Torinoki Housing Complex

== See also ==
- List of railway stations in Japan
