= Uchiko, Ehime =

Uchiko 内子町
- Town
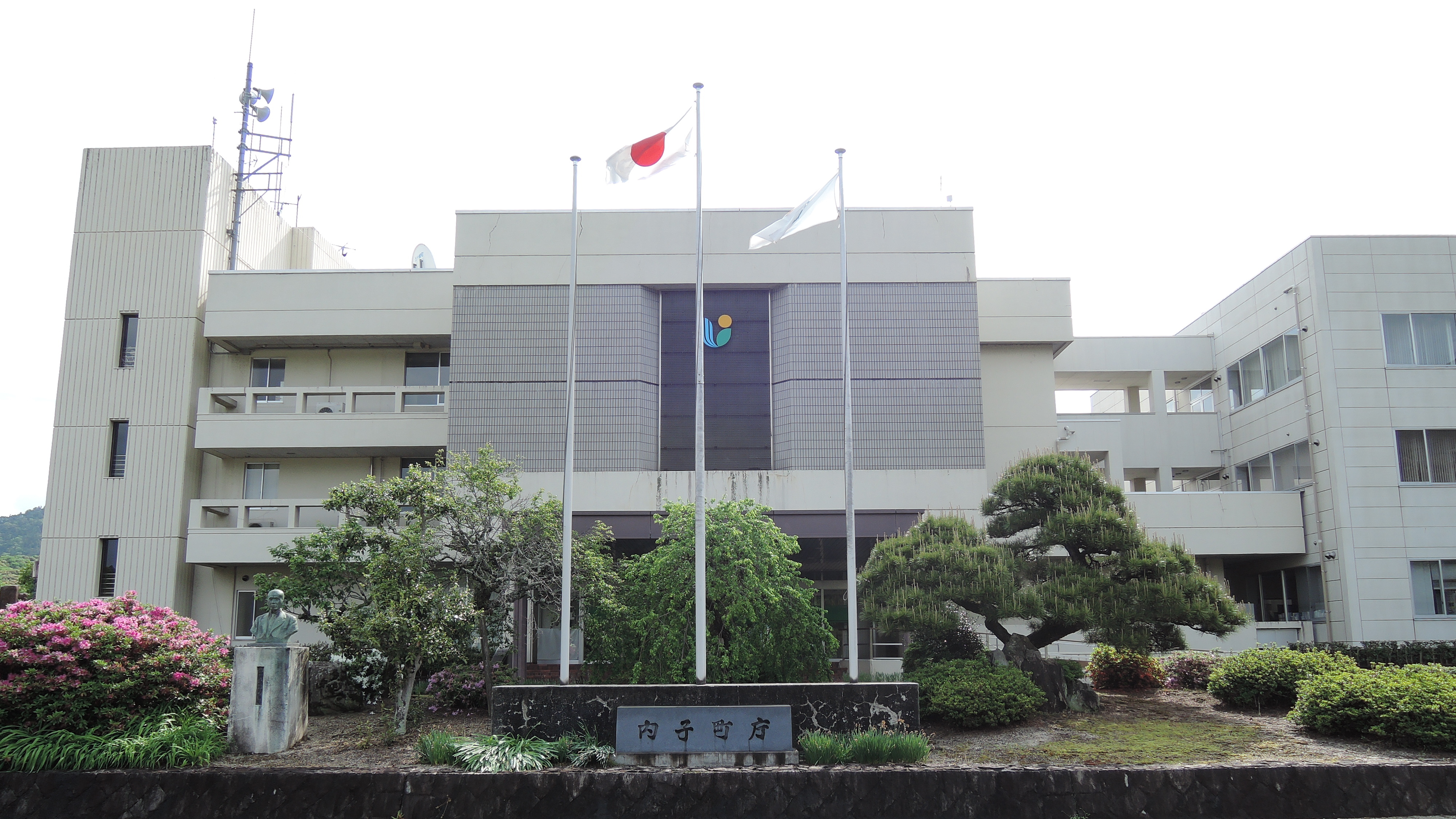
- Uchiko hall

- Flag Seal
- Location of Uchiko in Ehime Prefecture

- Location in Japan
- Coordinates: 33°32′N 132°39′E
- Country: Japan
- Region: Shikoku
- Prefecture: Ehime
- District: Kita

Area
  - Total: 299.43 km^{2} (115.61 sq mi)

Population (July 31, 2022)
  - Total: 15,554
  - Density: 51.945/km^{2} (134.54/sq mi)
- Time zone: UTC+09:00 (JST)
- City hall address: 168 Kō, Hiraoka, Uchiko-chō, Kita-gun, Ehime-ken 795-0392
- Website: Official website

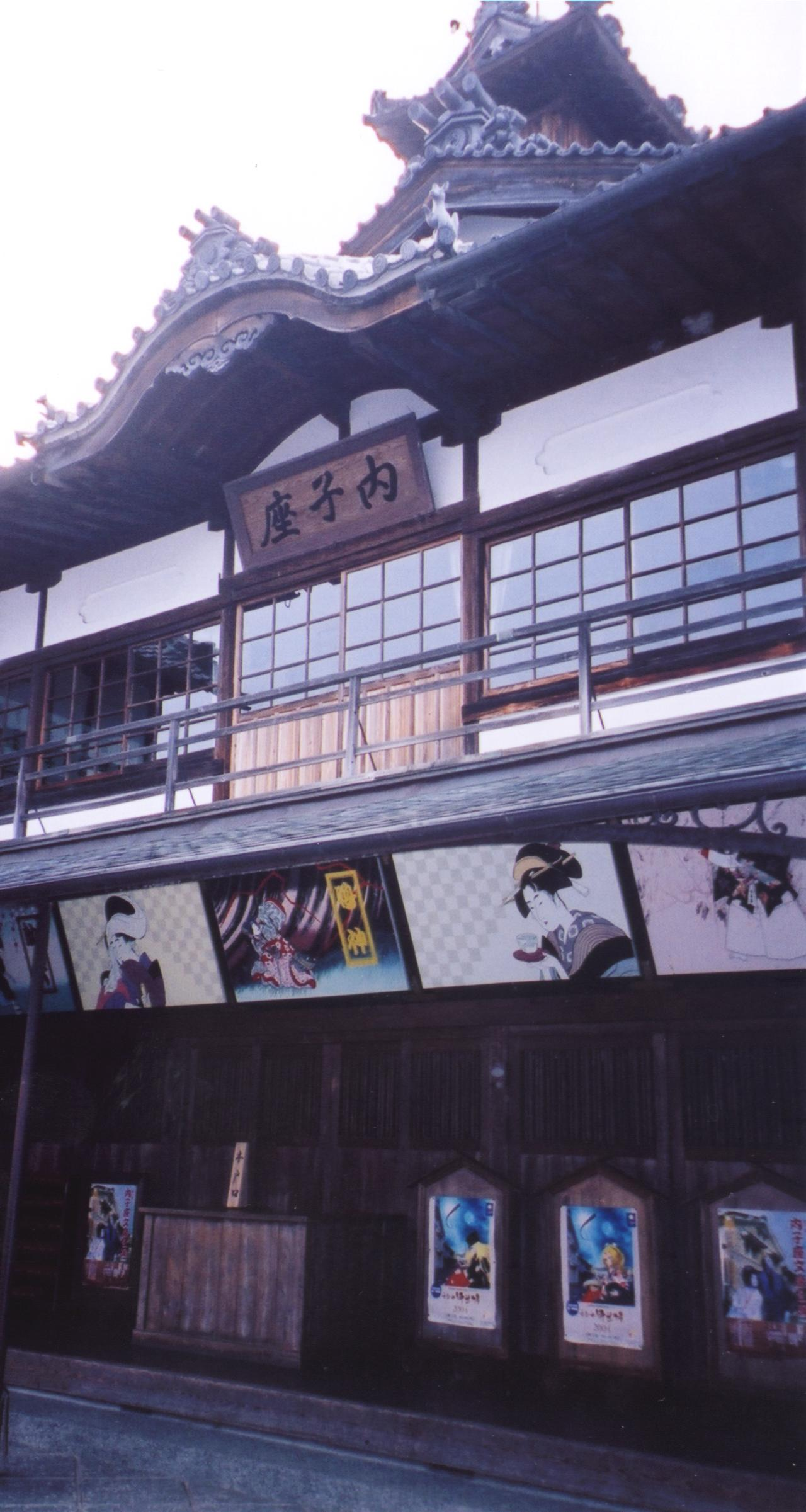
Uchiko Theatre

Uchiko (内子町, Uchiko-chō) is a town located in Kita District, Ehime Prefecture, Japan. As of 1 September 2023, the town had an estimated population of 15,153 in 7005 households and a population density of 52 persons per km^{2}. The total area of the town is 299.43 square kilometres (115.61 sq mi).

== Geography ==
Uchiko is located in roughly in the center of Ehime Prefecture, approximately 40 kilometers southwest of Matsuyama City, the prefectural capital.Three streams run through the area: the Oda, the Nakayama and the Fumoto. Uchiko has few flat areas and about 70% of the land is forest.

=== Neighbouring municipalities ===
Ehime Prefecture

- Iyo
- Kumakōgen
- Ōzu
- Seiyo
- Tobe

=== Climate ===
Uchiko has a humid subtropical climate (Köppen Cfa) characterized by warm summers and cool winters with light snowfall. The average annual temperature in Uchiko is 14.8 °C. The average annual rainfall is 1915 mm with September as the wettest month. The temperatures are highest on average in August, at around 25.8 °C, and lowest in January, at around 3.9 °C.

== Demographics ==
Per Japanese census data, the population of Uchiko has decreased steadily since the 1950s.

Historical population
Year	Pop.	±%
1920	30,205	—
1930	33,039	+9.4%
1940	32,489	−1.7%
1950	41,781	+28.6%
1960	38,947	−6.8%
1970	29,059	−25.4%
1980	25,336	−12.8%
1990	22,687	−10.5%
2000	20,782	−8.4%
2010	18,045	−13.2%
2020	15,322	−15.1%

== History ==
The area of Uchiko was part of ancient Iyo Province and prospered since ancient times as an important transportation hub on the Ōzu Highway and as a transit point for the Shikoku Pilgrimage. During the Edo period, the area was part of the holdings of Ōzu Domain or its semi-subsidiary, Niiya Domain. The town of Uchikoi was established with the creation of the modern municipalities system on December 1, 1889. From the Edo period to the Meiji period, it prospered in the production of Japanese paper and Japanese wax. In particular, Japanese wax became famous overseas for its high quality, accounting for about 30% of the national production at its peak. At that time the Yokaichi and Gokoku districts became industrialised and their historical houses still retain some vestige of Uchiko's former glory. In the Yokaichi and Gokoku districts is a street of merchant houses, which have solemn white or cream coloured plaster walls, lattices, decorative walls and old-style Japanese desks. This traditional street is about 600 meters long and around 90 of these historical houses are still lived in. After the Taisho period (1912–1926), Japan wax production declined due to the spread of oil and electricity. In 1982, its historic townscape was designated as an "Important Preservation District for Groups of Traditional Buildings". On January 1, 2005, the town of Ikazaki, from Kita District; and the town of Oda, from Kamiukena District, were merged into Uchiko.

== Government ==
Uchiko has a mayor-council form of government with a directly elected mayor and a unicameral town council of 15 members. Uchiko, together Ōzu, contributes two members to the Ehime Prefectural Assembly.

In terms of national politics, Uchiko is part of Ehime 3rd district of the lower house of the Diet of Japan. Prior to 2022, the town was part of Ehime 4th district.

== Economy ==
Uchiko has a typical hilly and mountainous area, and agriculture and forestry are the main industries. The soil is fertile and leaf tobacco, shiitake mushrooms, and fruits such as persimmons, grapes and nashi pears make use of the sloping land, opening the way for tourist orchards.. The riversides are used mainly by farms and farmland can extend to the hills and the steep mountainsides.

== Education ==
Uchiko has eight public elementary schools and four public middle schools operated by the town government, and two public high schools operated by the Ehime Prefectural Board of Education.

== Transportation ==
=== Railway ===
Shikoku Railway Company - Yosan Line

- Iyo-Tachikawa - Uchiko

Shikoku Railway Company - Uchiko Line

- Ikazaki - Uchiko

=== Highways ===
- Matsuyama Expressway
- National Route 56
- National Route 379
- National Route 380

== Sister cities ==
- Rothenburg ob der Tauber, Germany
- Wasilla, Alaska, United States

== Local attractions ==
=== Uchiko Theatre ===
The Uchiko-za was built as a traditional Kabuki theatre in 1916 and was famous for its Kabuki and Bunraku (traditional puppet show) performances. In the course of time, it became used for film shows, variety shows and lectures, amongst other things. In 1985, the theatre was restored to its original appearance. Today, Uchiko-za presents plays, concerts and other events, including the very popular Bunraku performances. The Uchiko-za is unique and traditional because of its open Taiko-drum tower, the boxed seating area, the broad ramp leading to the stage along one side of the audience and the wooden, revolving stage. The Uchiko-za is considered a showpiece of Japanese culture and architecture.

=== The Kamihaga Residence and Japanese Wax Museum ===
The Kamihaga Residence was built in 1894 by a family who were a branch of the Honhaga household (the main household in Uchiko). The Kamihaga family was one of the most influential families in Uchiko. They established the production of wax in Uchiko and thus, the family became very wealthy and powerful. Now, this elegant and traditional property, with its spacious garden, is used a museum that has exhibitions on commerce, the lifestyle of the merchants and the production of wax. These grounds are designated as an Important Cultural Property and have been since 1990.

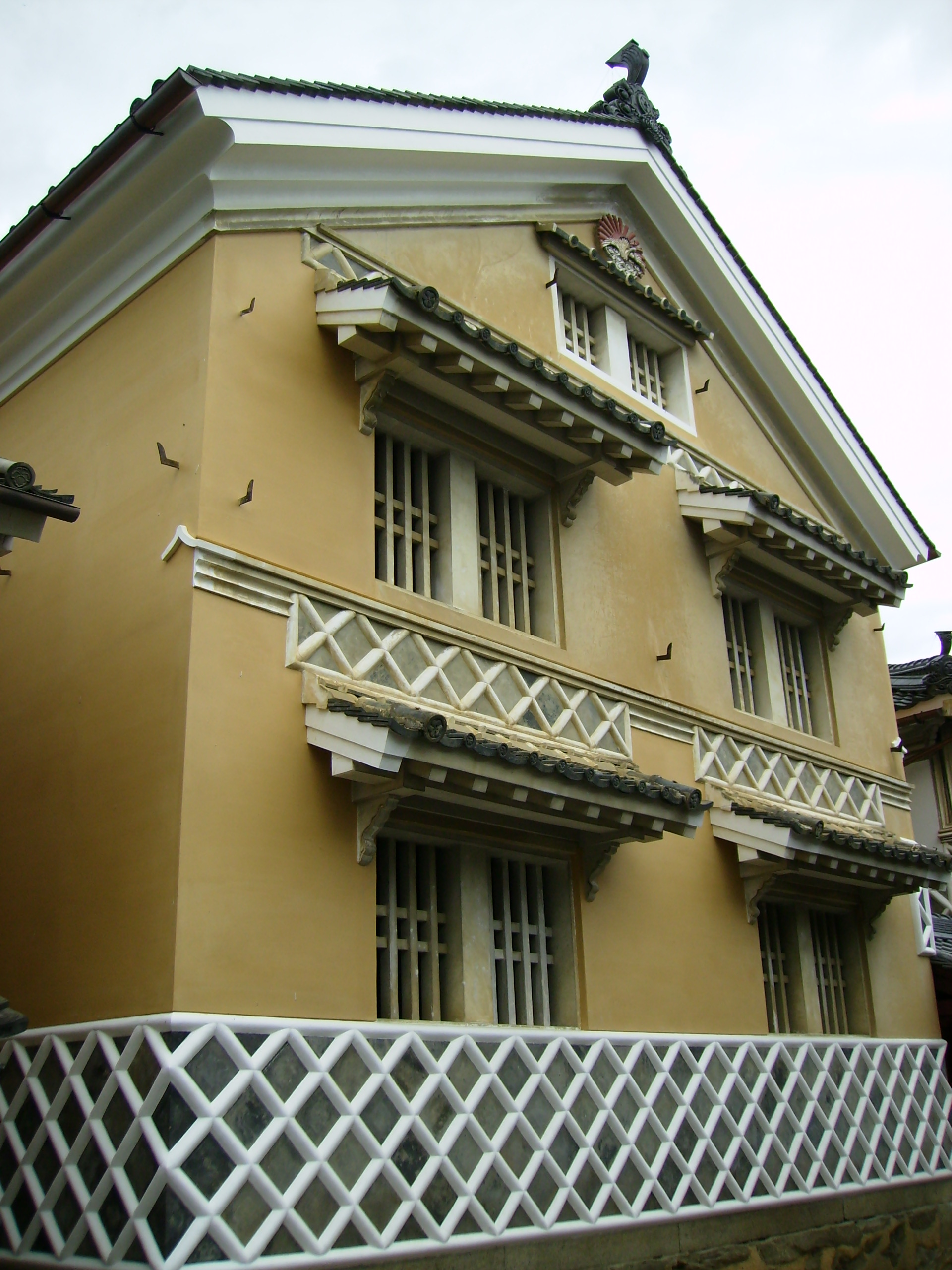
Merchant's Residence

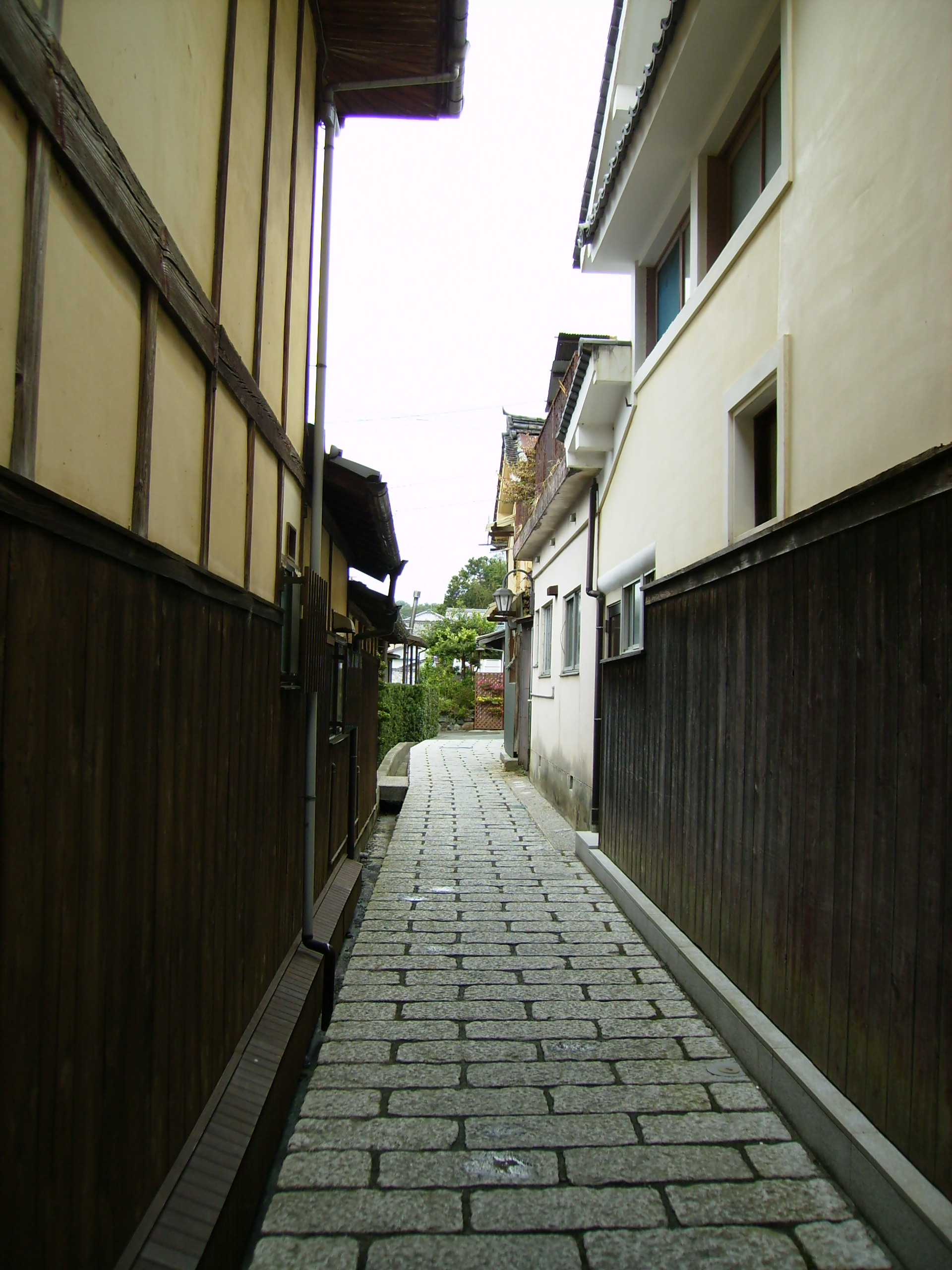
Side Street in Uchiko

=== Yokaichi-Gokoku Street (八日市・護国町並保存センタ) ===
The Yokaichi-Gokoku Street is known for its preserved traditional Japanese buildings, and historic architecture.

== Annual events ==
- Late April: The Raft Festival at the River Oda, Oda.
- May 5: The Kite Flying Festival in Ikazaki.
- Late May – Early June:Rice planting in Ikazaki
- August 6–8: The Bamboo Festival in Uchiko.
- August 15: The Fire Festival in Oda.
- October: The Autumn Festival, The Japanese Lion Dance.
- November: Momiji – Autumn leaf viewing.
- December: Solfa Ski Resort opens in Oda.

== Notable people from Uchiko ==
- The Nobel laureate Kenzaburō Ōe was born in the former village of Ōse, which is now today a part of Uchiko.
