= Uwakai =

Japanese limited express train service

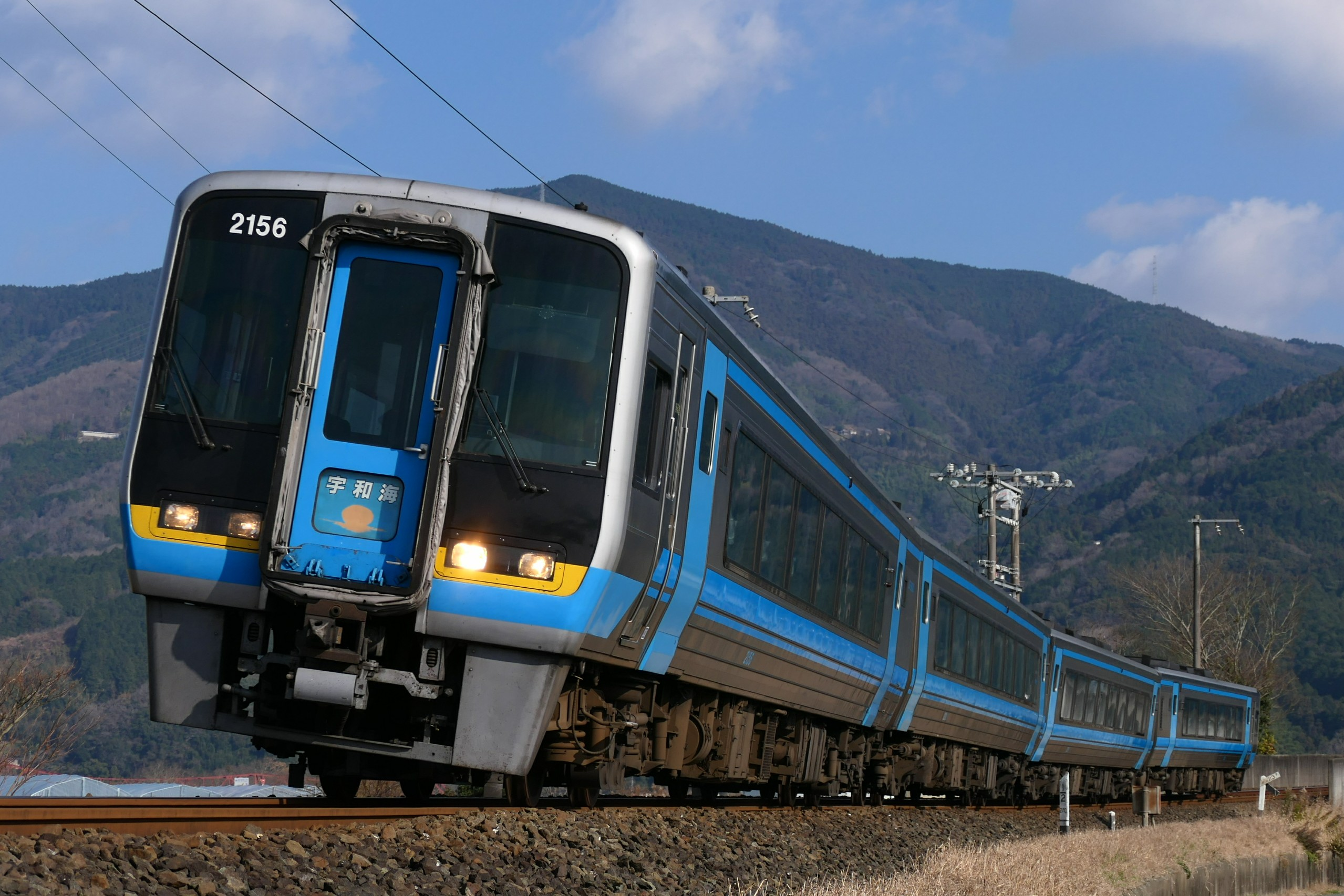
- A 2000 series train on an Uwakai service in January 2020

Overview
- Service type: Limited express
- First service: 1990
- Current operator: JR Shikoku

Route
- Lines used: Yosan Line, Uchiko Line

Technical
- Rolling stock: 2000 series DMUs
- Operating speed: 120 km/h (75 mph) (max)

The Uwakai (宇和海) is a limited express train service in Japan operated by JR Shikoku which runs from Matsuyama to Uwajima.

The Uwakai service was introduced on 21 November 1990.

== Route ==
The main stations served by this service are as follows.

Matsuyama - Iyoshi - (Iyo-Nakayama) - Uchiko - Iyo-Ōzu - Yawatahama - Iyo-Yoshida - Uwajima

== Rolling stock ==
- 2000 series 3- or 4-car tilting DMUs (from 1993)

=== Past rolling stock ===
- KiHa 181 series DMUs (1990–1993)
- KiHa 185 series DMUs (1990–1993)

== History ==
- November 1990: Uwakai services start between Matsuyama and Uwajima.
- March 1993: 2000 series tilting DMUs are introduced.
