= Yosan Line =

Railway line in Japan

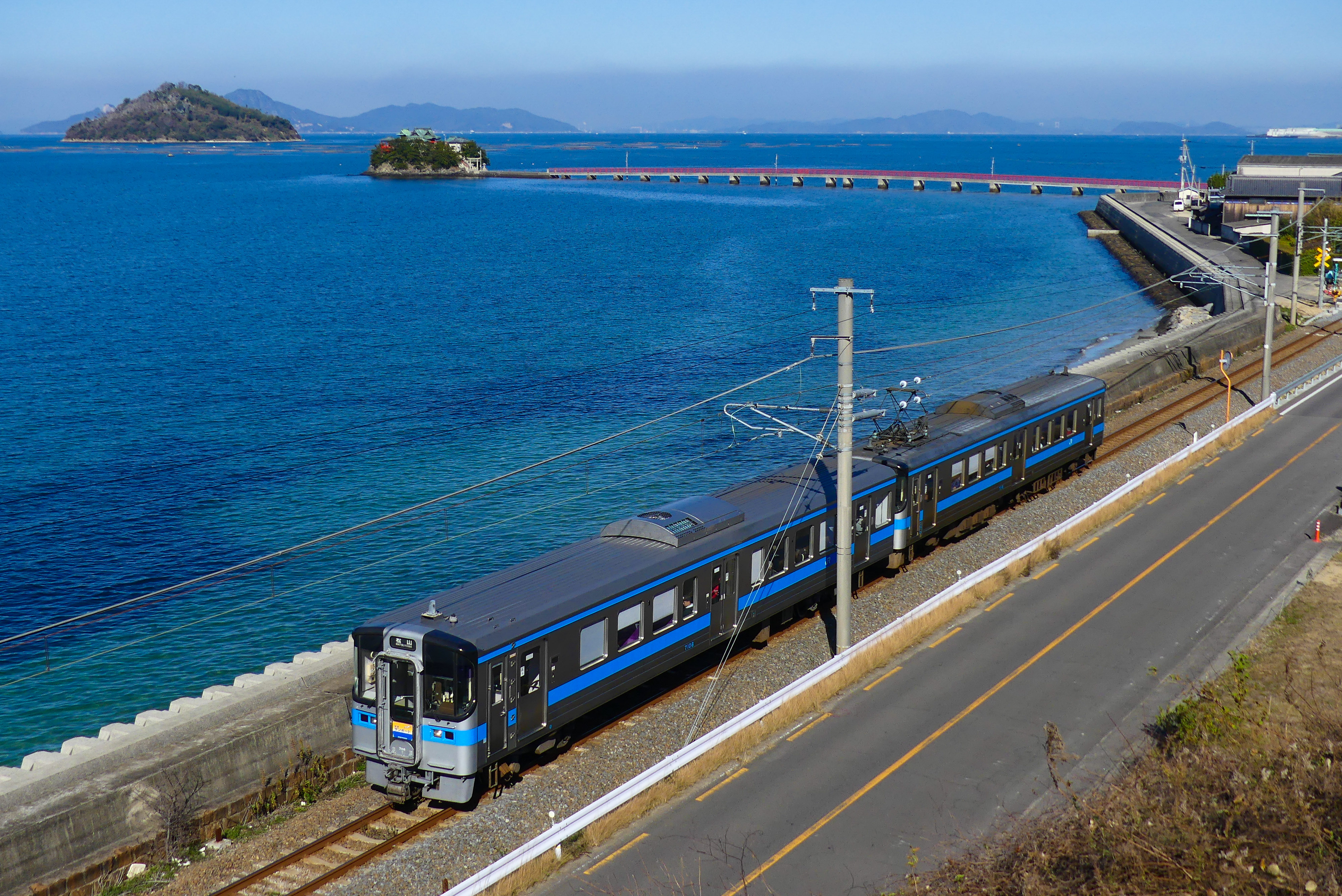
- 7000 series near Tsushimanomiya Station

Overview
- Locale: Kagawa, Ehime Prefectures
- Termini: Takamatsu; Uwajima
- Stations: 94

Service
- Type: Heavy rail
- Operator(s): JR Shikoku

History
- Opened: 1889; 137 years ago

Technical
- Line length: 297.6 km (184.9 mi)
- Track gauge: 1,067 mm (3 ft 6 in)
- Electrification: Takamatsu — Iyoshi (1,500 V DC)
- Operating speed: 130 km/h (81 mph)
Route map

The Yosan Line (予讃線, Yosan-sen) is the principal railway line on the island of Shikoku in Japan, connecting the major cities of Shikoku, and via the Honshi-Bisan Line, with Honshu. It is operated by the Shikoku Railway Company (JR Shikoku), and is aligned approximately parallel with the Inland Sea coast, connecting the prefectural capitals of Takamatsu (Kagawa Prefecture) and Matsuyama (Ehime Prefecture) and continuing on to Uwajima. The name of the line comes from Iyo (伊予) and Sanuki (讃岐), the old names of Ehime and Kagawa, respectively.

The line splits into two alignments between Mukaibara and Iyo-Ōzu. The original main line follows the coast via Iyo-Nagahama, while the direct line, opened in 1986 as a bypass of the lengthy coastal route, goes through the mountains via Uchiko, part of which is known as the Uchiko Line (as it was originally part of the Uchiko branch), and all Uwakai limited express trains now use this route.

Until 1988 the Yosan Line, along with the Dosan Line, connected with the Rail Ferry (from Uno) at Takamatsu Station. Direct services from Okayama now operate with the completion of the Great Seto Bridge system, over which the Honshi-Bisan Line travels.

== Basic data ==
- Operators, distances:
  - Shikoku Railway Company (JR Shikoku) (Services and tracks)
    - Takamatsu — Uwajima: 297.6 km (184.9 mi)
    - Mukaibara — Uchiko: 23.5 km (14.6 mi)
    - Niiya — Iyo-Ōzu: 5.9 km (3.7 mi)
  - Japan Freight Railway Company (JR Freight) (Services)
    - Takamatsu – Iyo-Yokota: 203.0 km (126.1 mi)
- Double-tracked section: Takamatsu – Tadotsu
- Railway signalling: Centralized Traffic Control (CTC)
- Maximum speed:
  - Takamatsu – Matsuyama: 130 km/h (80 mph)
  - Matsuyama – Uchiko, Iyo-Iwaki – Unomachi: 120 km/h (75 mph)
  - Other sections: 110 km/h (70 mph)

== Services ==
As the most important trunk line of Shikoku, the line has many limited express services. These include:

- Ishizuchi
- Midnight Express Takamatsu
- Shiokaze
- Uwakai
- Shimanto
- Nanpū
- Uzushio
- Sunrise Seto
- Midnight Express Matsuyama

There are two rapid services. The Sunport Nanpū Relay-Gō rapid service connects Takamatsu and Iyo-Saijō. The Marine Liner rapid service connects Takamatsu with Okayama via the Seto-Ōhashi Line.

Local service typically serves one of four sections of the Yosan Line, generally divided at Kan'onji, Iyo-Saijō, and Matsuyama.

== History ==
The first segment of the line, from Tadotsu to Marugame, was constructed by the Sanuki Railway Co. and commenced operation in 1889. The Marugame - Takamatsu section opened in 1897, and in the company was nationalised in 1906.

The line was extended west from Tadotsu in sections commencing in 1913, reaching Matsuyama in 1927. Further west, a private 762 mm (2 ft 6.0 in) gauge line was opened from Iyo Nagahama - Iyo Ozu, with the line being nationalised in 1933. The line from Matsuyama was extended in sections to Iyo Nagahama between 1927 and 1935, with the former private line being regauged to 1,067 mm (3 ft 6.0 in) gauge in 1935. Further western extensions opened 1936–45, when Uwajima (and the Yodo Line) was connected to the Yosan line.

On August 1, 1933, the entire line was renamed the Yosan Main Line. In 1987, with the privatization of the Japanese National Railways, the line became simply the Yosan Line.

The Takamatsu - Tadotsu section was duplicated 1965–70, and CTC signalling commissioned in 1985 between Takamatsu - Matsuyama. The 'direct line' between Mukaibara - Iyo Ozu (including the 6,012m Inuyose tunnel) opened in 1986, incorporating part of the former Uchicko branch and shortening the route by 6.3 km.

The Takamatsu - Tadotsu section was electrified in 1987, enabling direct Takamatsu - Okayama services when the Seto Ohashi Bridge system opened the following year.

The Iyo Hojo - Matsuyama - Iyoshi section was electrified in 1990, with the Tadotsu - Imabari section being energised in 1992, and the Imabari - Iyo Hojo section in 1993, enabling direct Matsuyama - Okayama electric services to be introduced.

Following the Tohoku major earthquake in 2011, JR Shikoku, JR East, and JR Freight announced that JR Shikoku's popular Ampanman Torokko Train would tour areas devastated by the earthquake and tsunami.

=== Former connecting lines ===
Sakaide station -

- The Kotohira Express Railway Co. operated a 16 km line to Kotohira on the Dosan Line 1930–44, with the line formally closing in 1954.
- The Kotohira Sangu Railway Co. operated a 27 km line to Tadotsu 1922/28 - 63, with a 7 km branch to Kotohira operated 1923–63.

Niihama Station - The Sumitomo Copper Co. operated a 15 km 762 mm gauge line to Hinokiogawa (known as the 'bottom line') opened in 1893 which included a 3 km duplicated section. It carried passengers 1929–55, and was electrified at 600 V DC in 1950. The mine closed in 1973 and the railway 4 years later. An isolated 5.5 km 762 mm line, situated at 80 0m elevation (known as the 'top line') and connected to the bottom line by a cableway operated 1893–1911.

== Station list ==
- Local trains stop at every station.
- For information on the Shiokaze, Ishizuchi, Uwakai and other limited express services, please see their respective articles.

Legend
Station: "●": all trains stop; "▲": some trains stop; "｜": all trains pass
Track: "∥": double-track section; "◇": single-track section (passing allowed); "｜": single-track section (no passing); "v" & "^": transition to/from double-track section

=== Takamatsu – Iyo-Saijō ===
- Sunport: Includes Sunport Nanpū Relay-Gō rapid service; non-rapid Nanpū Relay-Gō trains stop at every station.

Station number	Station	Japanese	Distance (km)		Rapid		Transfers		Location	
Station number	Station	Japanese	Between stations	Total	Sunport	Marine Liner	Transfers		Location	
Y00	Takamatsu	高松	-	0.0	●	●	■ Kōtoku Line (T28); Kotoden Kotohira Line (Takamatsu-Chikkō)	∥	Takamatsu	Kagawa
Y01	Kōzai	香西	3.4	3.4	｜	｜		∥	Takamatsu	Kagawa
	Takamatsu Freight Terminal	高松貨物ターミナル	1.3	4.7	｜	｜		∥	Takamatsu	Kagawa
Y02	Kinashi	鬼無	1.4	6.1	▲	▲		∥	Takamatsu	Kagawa
Y03	Hashioka	端岡	3.4	9.5	●	▲		∥	Takamatsu	Kagawa
Y04	Kokubu	国分	2.4	11.9	▲	▲		∥	Takamatsu	Kagawa
Y05	Sanuki-Fuchū	讃岐府中	2.3	14.2	｜	｜		∥	Sakaide	Kagawa
Y06	Kamogawa	鴨川	2.4	16.6	▲	▲		∥	Sakaide	Kagawa
Y07	Yasoba	八十場	2.0	18.6	｜	｜		∥	Sakaide	Kagawa
Y08	Sakaide	坂出	2.7	21.3	●	●	Honshi-Bisan Line (Seto-Ōhashi Line: Marine Liner through service (Note: Trains traveling through onto the Honshi-Bisan Line from Takamatsu do not serve Utazu but pass through it; this is reflected in fare calculations.))	∥	Sakaide	Kagawa
Y09	Utazu	宇多津	4.6	25.9	●	Honshi- Bisan Line through service	Honshi-Bisan Line (Seto-Ōhashi Line: some trains through to Tadotsu and Takamatsu)	∥	Utazu, Ayauta District	Kagawa
Y10	Marugame	丸亀	2.6	28.5	●	Honshi- Bisan Line through service		∥	Marugame	Kagawa
Y11	Sanuki-Shioya	讃岐塩屋	1.5	30.0	●	Honshi- Bisan Line through service		∥	Marugame	Kagawa
Y12	Tadotsu	多度津	2.7	32.7	●	Honshi- Bisan Line through service	■ Dosan Line (D12) (some trains through towards Utazu)	∨	Tadotsu, Nakatado District	Kagawa
Y13	Kaiganji	海岸寺	3.8	36.5	●	Honshi- Bisan Line through service		◇	Tadotsu, Nakatado District	Kagawa
	Tsushimanomiya (Note: Tsushimanomiya Station opens only during the August 4 and 5 summer festival at the nearby Tsushima Shrine. Among seasonal stations the station has the shortest number of operating days per year in Japan.)	津島ノ宮	3.3	39.8	●	Honshi- Bisan Line through service		｜	Mitoyo	Kagawa
Y14	Takuma	詫間	2.2	42.0	●	Honshi- Bisan Line through service		◇	Mitoyo	Kagawa
Y15	Mino	みの	2.5	44.5	●			｜	Mitoyo	Kagawa
Y16	Takase	高瀬	2.5	47.0	●			◇	Mitoyo	Kagawa
Y17	Hijidai	比地大	3.0	50.0	●			｜	Mitoyo	Kagawa
Y18	Motoyama	本山	2.4	52.4	●			◇	Mitoyo	Kagawa
Y19	Kan'onji	観音寺	4.1	56.5	●			◇	Kan'onji	Kagawa
Y20	Toyohama	豊浜	5.5	62.0	●			◇	Kan'onji	Kagawa
Y21	Minoura	箕浦	4.4	66.4	●			◇	Kan'onji	Kagawa
Y22	Kawanoe	川之江	5.8	72.2	●			◇	Shikokuchūō	Ehime
Y23	Iyo-Mishima	伊予三島	5.4	77.6	●			◇	Shikokuchūō	Ehime
Y24	Iyo-Sangawa	伊予寒川	4.1	81.7	●			◇	Shikokuchūō	Ehime
Y25	Akaboshi	赤星	4.2	85.9	●			｜	Shikokuchūō	Ehime
Y26	Iyo-Doi	伊予土居	2.7	88.6	●			◇	Shikokuchūō	Ehime
Y27	Sekigawa	関川	3.6	92.2	●			◇	Shikokuchūō	Ehime
Y28	Takihama	多喜浜	7.2	99.4	●			◇	Niihama	Ehime
Y29	Niihama	新居浜	3.7	103.1	●			◇	Niihama	Ehime
Y30	Nakahagi	中萩	4.8	107.9	●			◇	Niihama	Ehime
Y31	Iyo-Saijō	伊予西条	6.4	114.3	●			◇	Saijō	Ehime
(continues below)

=== Iyo-Saijō – Iyo-Nagahama – Uwajima ===
- All stations located in Ehime Prefecture.

Station number	Station	Japanese	Distance (km)		Transfers		Location
Station number	Station	Japanese	Between stations	From Takamatsu	Transfers		Location
(continued from above)
Y31	Iyo-Saijō	伊予西条	-	114.3		◇	Saijō
Y32	Ishizuchiyama	石鎚山	3.5	117.8		◇	Saijō
Y33	Iyo-Himi	伊予氷見	2.5	120.3		｜	Saijō
Y34	Iyo-Komatsu	伊予小松	1.3	121.6		◇	Saijō
Y35	Tamanoe	玉之江	2.9	124.5		｜	Saijō
Y36	Nyūgawa	壬生川	2.3	126.8		◇	Saijō
Y37	Iyo-Miyoshi	伊予三芳	3.4	130.2		◇	Saijō
Y38	Iyo-Sakurai	伊予桜井	7.6	137.8		◇	Imabari
Y39	Iyo-Tomita	伊予富田	3.8	141.6		◇	Imabari
Y40	Imabari	今治	3.3	144.9		◇	Imabari
Y41	Hashihama	波止浜	4.7	149.6		◇	Imabari
Y42	Namikata	波方	2.7	152.3		◇	Imabari
Y43	Ōnishi	大西	4.1	156.4		◇	Imabari
Y44	Iyo-Kameoka	伊予亀岡	5.5	161.9		◇	Imabari
Y45	Kikuma	菊間	4.0	165.9		◇	Imabari
Y46	Asanami	浅海	4.7	170.6		◇	Matsuyama
Y47	Ōura	大浦	3.2	173.8		◇	Matsuyama
Y48	Iyo-Hōjō	伊予北条	3.1	176.9		◇	Matsuyama
Y49	Yanagihara	柳原	2.2	179.1		｜	Matsuyama
Y50	Awai	粟井	1.2	180.3		◇	Matsuyama
Y51	Kōyōdai	光洋台	2.0	182.3		｜	Matsuyama
Y52	Horie	堀江	2.6	184.9		◇	Matsuyama
Y53	Iyo-Wake	伊予和気	2.1	187.0		◇	Matsuyama
Y54	Mitsuhama	三津浜	3.7	190.7		◇	Matsuyama
Y55 U00	Matsuyama	松山	3.7	194.4	Iyotetsu Ōtemachi Line (Matsuyama-Ekimae)	◇	Matsuyama
U01	Ichitsubo	市坪	3.5	197.9		◇	Matsuyama
U02	Kita-Iyo	北伊予	2.4	200.3		◇	Masaki, Iyo District
U02-1	Minami-Iyo	南伊予	1.6	201.9		｜	Iyo
U03	Iyo-Yokota	伊予横田	1.1	203.0		｜	Masaki, Iyo District
U04	Torinoki	鳥ノ木	1.8	204.8		｜	Iyo
U05	Iyoshi	伊予市	1.2	206.0	■ Iyotetsu Gunchū Line (Gunchūkō)	◇	Iyo
U06 S06	Mukaibara	向井原	2.5	208.5	■ Yosan Line (for Uchiko)	｜	Iyo
S07	Kōnokawa	高野川	5.4	213.9		｜	Iyo
S08	Iyo-Kaminada	伊予上灘	3.2	217.1		◇	Iyo
S09	Shimonada	下灘	5.3	222.4		｜	Iyo
S10	Kushi	串	2.6	225.0		｜	Iyo
S11	Kitanada	喜多灘	3.2	228.2		｜	Ōzu
S12	Iyo-Nagahama	伊予長浜	4.9	233.1		◇	Ōzu
S13	Iyo-Izushi	伊予出石	2.8	235.9		｜	Ōzu
S14	Iyo-Shirataki	伊予白滝	3.4	239.3		◇	Ōzu
S15	Hataki	八多喜	2.4	241.7		｜	Ōzu
S16	Haruka	春賀	1.7	243.4		｜	Ōzu
S17	Gorō	五郎	2.3	245.7		｜	Ōzu
	Iyo-Wakamiya Junction	伊予若宮信号場	-	(247.1)	Official junction of Uchiko branch	◇	Ōzu
S18 U14	Iyo-Ōzu	伊予大洲	3.8	249.5	■ Yosan Line (for Niiya)	◇	Ōzu
U15	Nishi-Ōzu	西大洲	2.1	251.6		｜	Ōzu
U16	Iyo-Hirano	伊予平野	1.9	253.5		◇	Ōzu
U17	Senjō	千丈	7.1	260.6		◇	Yawatahama
U18	Yawatahama	八幡浜	2.2	262.8		◇	Yawatahama
U19	Futaiwa	双岩	4.7	267.5		◇	Yawatahama
U20	Iyo-Iwaki	伊予石城	4.9	272.4		◇	Seiyo
U21	Kami-Uwa	上宇和	3.0	275.4		｜	Seiyo
U22	Unomachi	卯之町	2.0	277.4		◇	Seiyo
U23	Shimo-Uwa	下宇和	2.6	280.0		◇	Seiyo
U24	Tachima	立間	6.6	286.6		◇	Uwajima
U25	Iyo-Yoshida	伊予吉田	2.7	289.3		◇	Uwajima
U26	Takamitsu	高光	4.6	293.9		｜	Uwajima
U27	Kita-Uwajima	北宇和島	2.2	296.1	■ Yodo Line (G46) (Note: Although the official start of the Yodo Line is at Kita-Uwajima, all trains run through to/from Uwajima)	◇	Uwajima
U28	Uwajima	宇和島	1.5	297.6	■ Yodo Line (G47)	∧	Uwajima

=== Mukaibara – Uchiko – Iyo-Ōzu ===
- Station list includes the Uchiko Line section between Uchiko and Niiya.
- All stations located in Ehime Prefecture.

Line	Station number	Station	Japanese	Distance (km)			Transfers		Location
Line	Station number	Station	Japanese	Between stations	Total		Transfers		Location
Yosan; Line	U06	Mukaibara	向井原	-	From Mukaibara; 0.0	From Takamatsu; 208.5	■ Yosan Line (for Matsuyama (U06), Iyo-Nagahama (S06)); All trains through to Iyoshi and/or Matsuyama	｜	Iyo
Yosan; Line	U07	Iyo-Ōhira	伊予大平	2.8	2.8	211.3		｜	Iyo
Yosan; Line	U08	Iyo-Nakayama	伊予中山	7.4	10.2	218.7		◇	Iyo
Yosan; Line	U09	Iyo-Tachikawa	伊予立川	6.7	16.9	225.4		◇	Uchiko, Kita District
Yosan; Line	U10	Uchiko	内子	6.6	23.5	232.0		◇	Uchiko, Kita District
Uchiko; Line	U10	Uchiko	内子	6.6	From Niiya; 5.3	232.0		◇	Uchiko, Kita District
Uchiko; Line	U11	Ikazaki	五十崎	1.6	3.7	233.6		｜	Uchiko, Kita District
Uchiko; Line	U12	Kitayama	喜多山	2.5	1.2	236.1		｜	Ōzu
Uchiko; Line	U13	Niiya	新谷	1.2	0.0	237.3		◇	Ōzu
Yosan; Line	U13	Niiya	新谷	1.2	0.0	237.3		◇	Ōzu
Yosan; Line		Iyo-Wakamiya Junction	伊予若宮信号場	-	(3.5)	(240.8)	Official junction of Iyo-Nagahama branch	◇	Ōzu
Yosan; Line	U14	Iyo-Ōzu	伊予大洲	5.9	5.9	243.2	■ Yosan Line (for Uwajima (U14), Iyo-Nagahama (S18)); Some trains through to Uwajima	◇	Ōzu

== See also ==
- List of railway lines in Japan
