= Mitsuhama Station =

Railway station in Matsuyama, Ehime Prefecture, Japan

Y54 Mitsuhama Station 三津浜駅
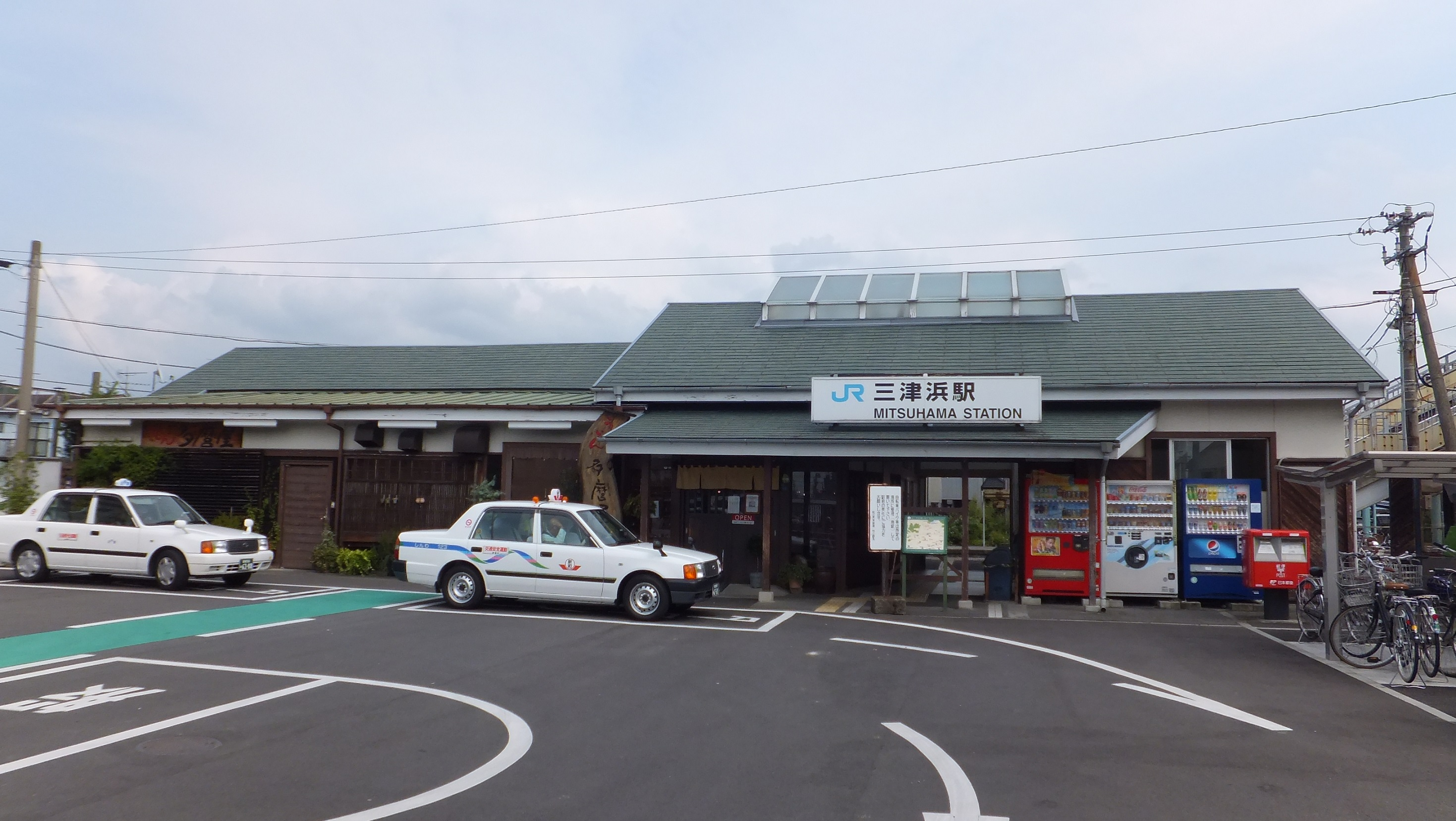
- Mitsuhama Station in 2015

General information
- Location: Aizu Town, Matsuyama City, Ehime Prefecture; Japan
- Coordinates: 33°51′41″N 132°43′44″E
- Operator: JR Shikoku
- Line: Yosan Line
- Distance: 190.7 km (118.5 mi) from Takamatsu
- Platforms: 2 side platforms
- Tracks: 2 + 1 siding

Construction
- Structure type: At grade
- Accessible: No - platforms linked by footbridge

Other information
- Status: Unstaffed
- Station code: Y54

History
- Opened: 3 April 1927; 99 years ago

Passengers
- FY2019: 1,092

Services
| Preceding station | JR Shikoku | Following station |
|---|---|---|
| Matsuyama Y55 U00 towards Uwajima | Yosan Line | Iyo-Wake Y53 towards Takamatsu |
Location
- Location within Ehime Prefecture Location within Japan

Mitsuhama Station (三津浜駅, Mitsuhama-eki) is a passenger railway station located in the city of Matsuyama, Ehime Prefecture, Japan. It is operated by JR Shikoku and has the station number "Y54".

== Lines ==
Mitsuhama Station is served by the JR Shikoku Yosan Line and is located 190.7 km from the beginning of the line at Takamatsu. Only Yosan Line local trains stop at the station and they only serve the sector between Iyo-Saijō and Matsuyama. Connections with other local or limited express trains are needed to travel further east or west along the line.

== Layout ==
The station consists of two opposed side platforms serving two tracks. Line 1, served by platform 1 on the side of the station building, is a straight track while line 2, served by the opposite side platform, is a passing loop. The station building is unstaffed and houses a waiting room and an automatic ticket vending machine. Access to platform 2 is by means of a footbridge. A siding branches off line 1 and juts in partially on the other side of platform 1.

== History ==
Mitsuhama Station opened on 3 April 1927 as an intermediate stop when the then Sanyo Line was extended from Iyo-Hōjō to Matsuyama. At that time the station was operated by Japanese Government Railways, later becoming Japanese National Railways (JNR). With the privatization of JNR on 1 April 1987, control of the station passed to JR Shikoku.

== Surrounding area ==
- Mitsuhama Port (30 minutes on foot)

== See also ==
- List of railway stations in Japan
