= Iyoshi Station =

Railway station in Iyo, Ehime Prefecture, Japan

U05 Iyoshi Station 伊予市駅
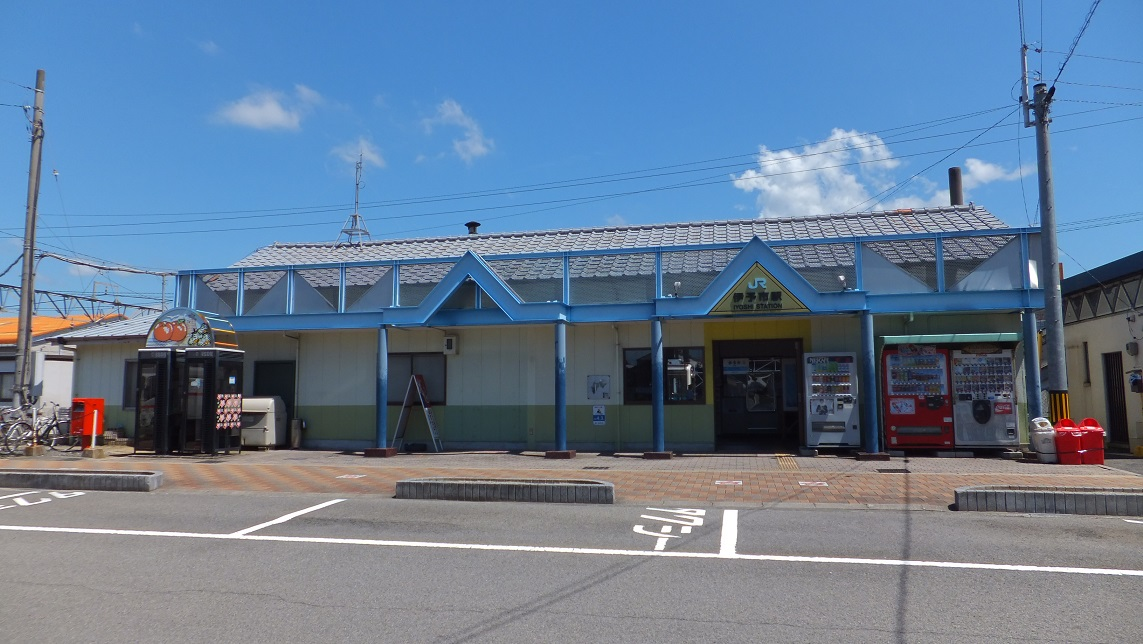
- Iyoshi Station, July 2008

General information
- Location: Kominato, Iyo City, Ehime Prefecture 799-3113; Japan
- Coordinates: 33.7553°N 132.7029°E
- Operator: JR Shikoku
- Line: Yosan Line
- Distance: 206.0 km (128.0 mi) from Takamatsu
- Platforms: 1 side + 1 island platform
- Connections: Gunchū Line (via Gunchū Port)

Construction
- Structure type: At grade
- Accessible: Yes

Other information
- Status: Staffed
- Station code: U05

History
- Opened: 27 February 1930; 96 years ago
- Former names: Minami Gunchū (to 1957)

Passengers
- FY2019: 1084

Services
Preceding station	JR Shikoku	Following station
Mukaibara U06 S06 towards Uwajima	Yosan Line	Torinoki U04 towards Takamatsu
Location
- Location within Ehime Prefecture Location within Japan

Iyoshi Station (伊予市駅, Iyoshi-eki) is a passenger railway station located in the city of Iyo, Ehime Prefecture, Japan. It is operated by JR Shikoku and has the station number "U05". The station is located near Gunchū Port Station on the Gunchū Line, owned by Iyotetsu.

== Lines ==
The station is served by the JR Shikoku Yosan Line and is located 206.0 km from the beginning of the line at Takamatsu. Eastbound local trains terminate at Matsuyama. Connections with other services are needed to travel further east of Matsuyama on the line.

The Uwakai limited express train, which runs between Matsuyama and Uwajima, stops at this station.

== Layout ==
Iyoshi Station is an above-ground station with a station building adjacent to a single side platform, and connected to an island platform by a footbridge. Platforms are numbered in order from the station building. Platform 1 has a straight through-line structure (there is no speed limit, but it is immediately to the west). Since there is a curve of R300 at the station, outbound trains are slowed down, but there are currently no regular trains passing through this station). Normally, both inbound and outbound trains arrive and depart from Platform 1, and only exchange trains and return trains use Platforms 2 and 3. This station is formally the boundary between non-electrified and electrified sections of the Yosan Line (most trains coming from the direction of Iyo-Hojo terminate at Matsuyama Station), and the west side of this station (towards Iyo-Nagahama and Uchiko) is non-electrified. The station building is large and tile-covered.The front portion has been refurbished and has ticket counters and automatic ticket vending machines.

== History ==
The station was opened on 27 February 1930 as Minami Gunchū Station (南郡中駅) along with the extension of the Sanyo Line from Matsuyama. About a month later, the line was renamed to the Yosan Line .At that time, the station was operated by Japanese Government Railways (JGR), later becoming Japanese National Railways (JNR). The station was renamed to its present name on 1 April 1957. A major change in this station was the opening of a new line from Mukaihara Station to Uchiko Station in March 1986.With the privatization of JNR on 1 April 1987, control of the station passed to JR Shikoku.

== Surrounding area ==
- Japan National Route 378, which passes in front of the station.
- Gunchū Port Station - Iyotetsu Gunchū Line
- Iyo City Hall
- Iyo Municipal Gunchu Elementary School
- Iyo Municipal Konan Junior High School

== See also ==
- List of railway stations in Japan
