= Uchiko Station =

Railway station in Uchiko, Ehime Prefecture, Japan

U10 Uchiko Station 内子駅
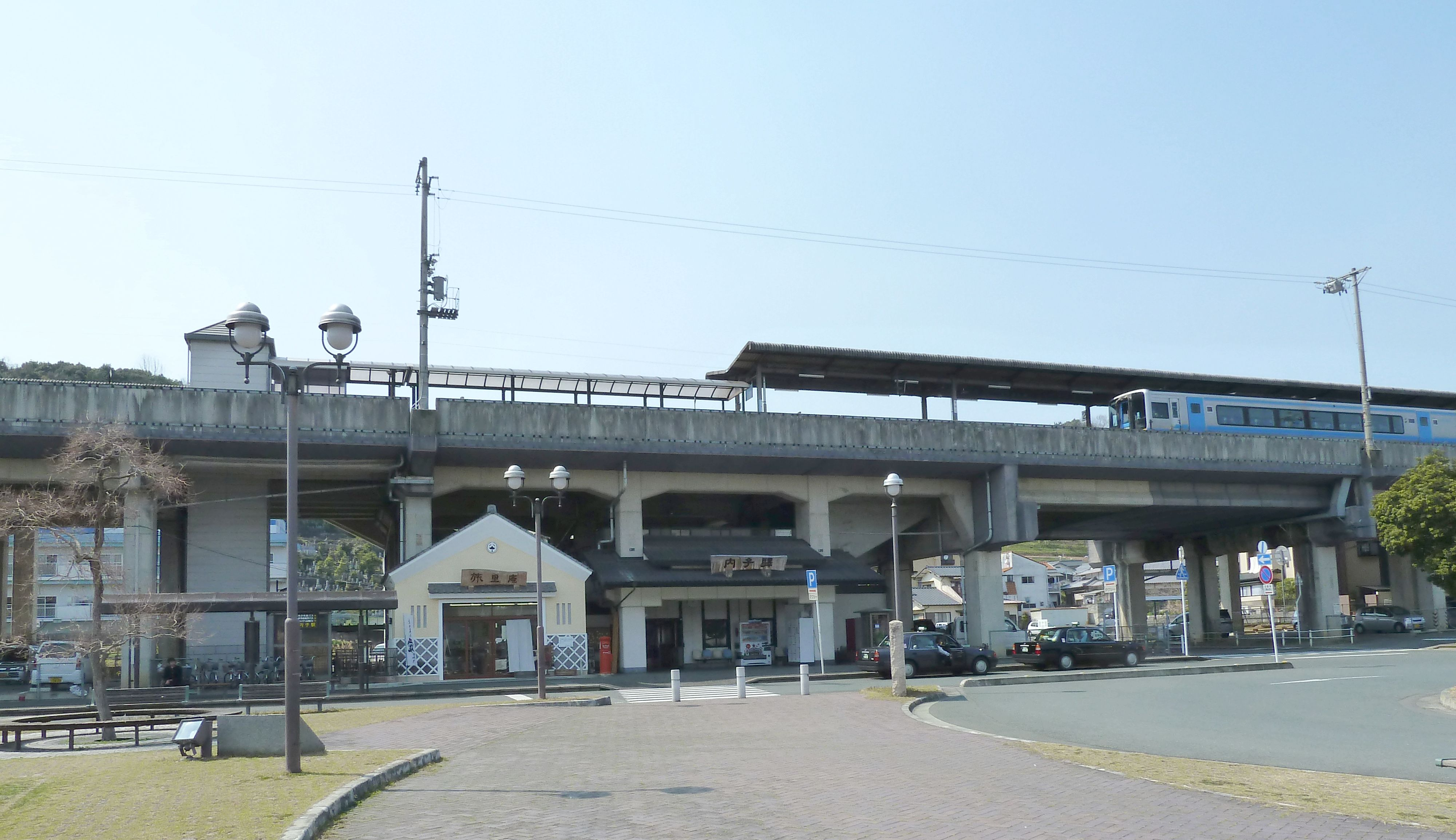
- Uchiko Station in 2011

General information
- Location: 107 Uchiko, Uchiko Town, Kita District; Ehime Prefecture 791-3301; Japan
- Coordinates: 33°32′58″N 132°38′47″E
- Operator: JR Shikoku
- Line: Yosan Line – Uchika
- Distance: 232.0 km (144.2 mi) from Takamatsu
- Platforms: 1 side + 1 island platforms
- Tracks: 3

Construction
- Structure type: Elevated
- Parking: Available
- Cycle facilities: Bike shed
- Accessible: Partial - elevator to platforms 1 and 2 only

Other information
- Status: Staffed - JR ticket window (Midori no Madoguchi)
- Station code: U10
- Website: Official website

History
- Opened: 1 May 1920; 106 years ago

Passengers
- FY2019: 1,254

Services
Preceding station	JR Shikoku	Following station
Ikazaki U11 towards Uwajima	Yosan Line (Uchiko Line)	Iyo-Tachikawa U09 towards Takamatsu
Location
- Location within Ehime Prefecture Location within Japan

Uchiko Station (内子駅, Uchiko-eki) is a passenger railway station on the Uchiko branch of the Yosan Line located in the town of Uchiko, Kita District, Ehime Prefecture, Japan. It is operated by JR Shikoku and has the station number "U10".

== Lines ==
Although Uchiko Station is officially on the Uchiko Line, JR Shikoku runs it operationally as part of Yosan Line and as such it only carries the "U" prefix common to other Yosan line stations. It is located 232.0 km from the beginning of the Yosan line at Takamatsu. Eastbound local trains which serve the station terminate at Matsuyama. Connections with other services are needed to travel further east of Matsuyama on the line.

The Uwakai limited express train, which runs between Matsuyama and Uwajima, stops at this station.

== Layout ==
The station consists of an island platform and a side platform serving three elevated tracks. A station building of tradition Japanese design with a tiled roof is located underneath the elevated structure and houses a waiting room and a JR ticket window (with a Midori no Madoguchi facility) on level 1. Stairs lead to a landing at level 2 which also has seats for waiting passengers. From there separate flights of stairs lead to level 3 where platforms 1 and 2 (island) and platform 3 (side platform) are located. An elevator is provided after the ticket gate on level 1 which leads directly to platforms 1 and 2 only. A bike shed is provided and parking is available under the elevated structure.

== Adjacent stations ==
«	Service	»
JR Limited Express Services
Iyo-Nakayama	Uwakai	Iyo-Ōzu

== History ==
The station was opened on 1 February 1920 as a terminus of the private Ehime Railway (愛媛鉄道, Ehime Tetsudō), a 762 mm (2 ft 6 in) light railway line starting from Wakamiya Junction (若宮連絡所, Wakamiya-renraku-sho), near Nagahama-machi (the present Iyo-Nagahama). On October 1, 1933, the line was nationalised and Japanese Government Railways (JGR) operated the station as part of the Ehime Line (愛媛線, Ehime-sen). On October 6, 1935, after the track had been re-gauged to 1,067 mm, the station became part of the Uchiko Line. Subsequently, Japanese National Railways (JNR), the successor to JGR, undertook the construction of the Uchiko branch of the Yosan Line which involved building a new stretch of track from Mukaibara to Uchiko. The track at Uchiko was re-aligned and elevated and the station location moved. The new station reopened on 3 March 1986. It was still designated as a station on the Uchiko Line but was now operated as part of the Yosan Line. With the privatization of JNR on 1 April 1987, control of the station passed to JR Shikoku.

== Surrounding area ==
- Uchiko Town Hall Main Building
- Ikazaki Kite Museum

== See also ==
- List of railway stations in Japan
