= Mukaibara Station =

Railway station in Iyo, Ehime Prefecture, Japan

S06 U06 Mukaibara Station 向井原駅
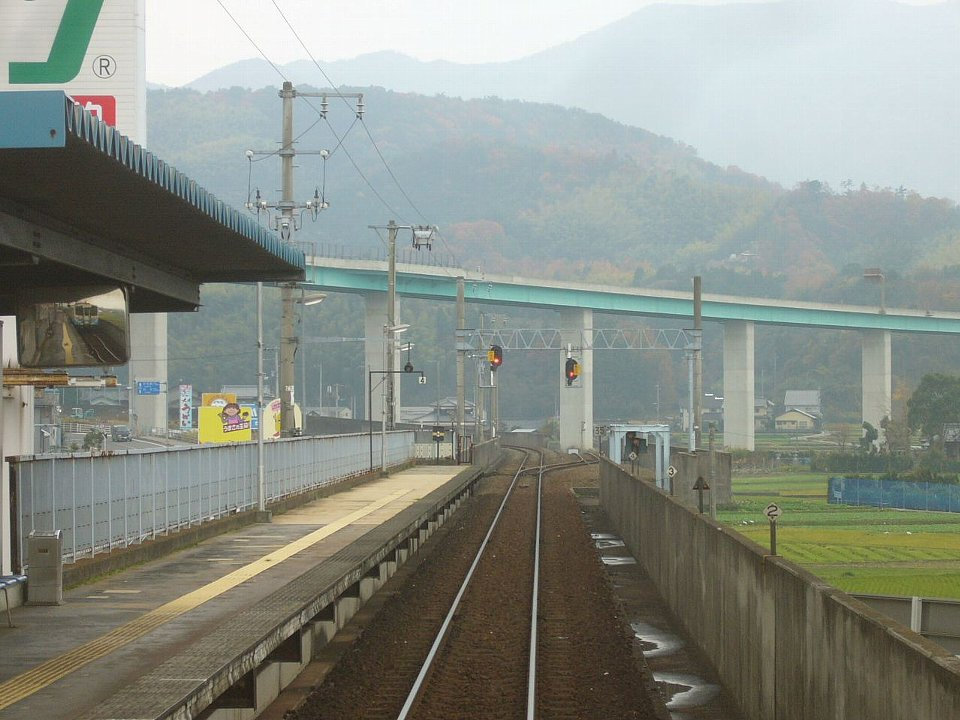
- Mukaibara Station, December 2006

General information
- Location: Nakamura, Iyo City, Ehime Prefecture 799-3123; Japan
- Coordinates: 33°44′10″N 132°41′45″E
- Operator: JR Shikoku
- Line: Yosan Line
- Distance: 208.5 km (129.6 mi) from Takamatsu
- Platforms: 1 side platform
- Tracks: 1

Construction
- Structure type: Elevated
- Accessible: No - stairs needed to reach elevated platform

Other information
- Status: Unstaffed
- Station code: S06, U06

History
- Opened: 1 October 1963; 62 years ago

Passengers
- FY2019: 90

Services
Preceding station	JR Shikoku	Following station
Iyo-Ōhira U07 towards Uwajima	Yosan Line	Iyoshi U05 towards Takamatsu
Kōnokawa S07 towards Uwajima	Yosan Line via Iyo-Nagahama	Iyoshi U05 towards Takamatsu
Location
- Location within Ehime Prefecture Location within Japan

Mukaibara Station (向井原駅, Mukaibara-eki) is a passenger railway station located in the city of Iyo, Ehime Prefecture, Japan. It is operated by JR Shikoku and is a junction station with dual station numbers "S06" and "U06". From here the Yosan Line divides into 2 branches. The older, original, branch along the coast has since 2014 been referred to as the Beloved Iyonada Line (愛ある伊予灘線, Ai aru iyonada-sen). Stations along it use the "S" prefix. Stations on the newer Uchiko branch use the "U" prefix.

== Lines ==
The station is served by the JR Shikoku Yosan Line and is 208.5 km from the beginning of the line at Takamatsu. Only Yosan Line local trains stop at the station, those serving the Iyonada branch heading for Kōnokawa and those serving the Uchiko branch heading for Iyo-Ōhira. Eastbound local trains terminate at Matsuyama. Connections with other services are needed to travel further east of Matsuyama on the line.

== Layout ==
The station, which is unstaffed, consists of a side platform serving a single elevated track. There is no station building, only a shelter for waiting passengers. Steps lead up to the platform and the station is thus no wheelchair accessible. Bicycle parking is available underneath the elevated station structure.

== History ==
Japanese National Railways (JNR) opened the station on 1 October 1963 as a stop on the existing Yosan Line. On 3 March 1986 the station reopened after having been elevated and moved 100 m nearer to the previous station of Iyoshi. At the same time the Uchiko branch was opened and the station became the official start of the branch. With the privatization of JNR on 1 April 1987, control of the station passed to JR Shikoku.

== Surrounding area ==
- Matsuyama Expressway Iyo IC
- Japan National Route 56
- Japan National Route 378
- Iyo City Kitayamazaki Elementary School

== See also ==
- List of railway stations in Japan
