= Uchiko Line =

Railway line in Ehime prefecture, Japan

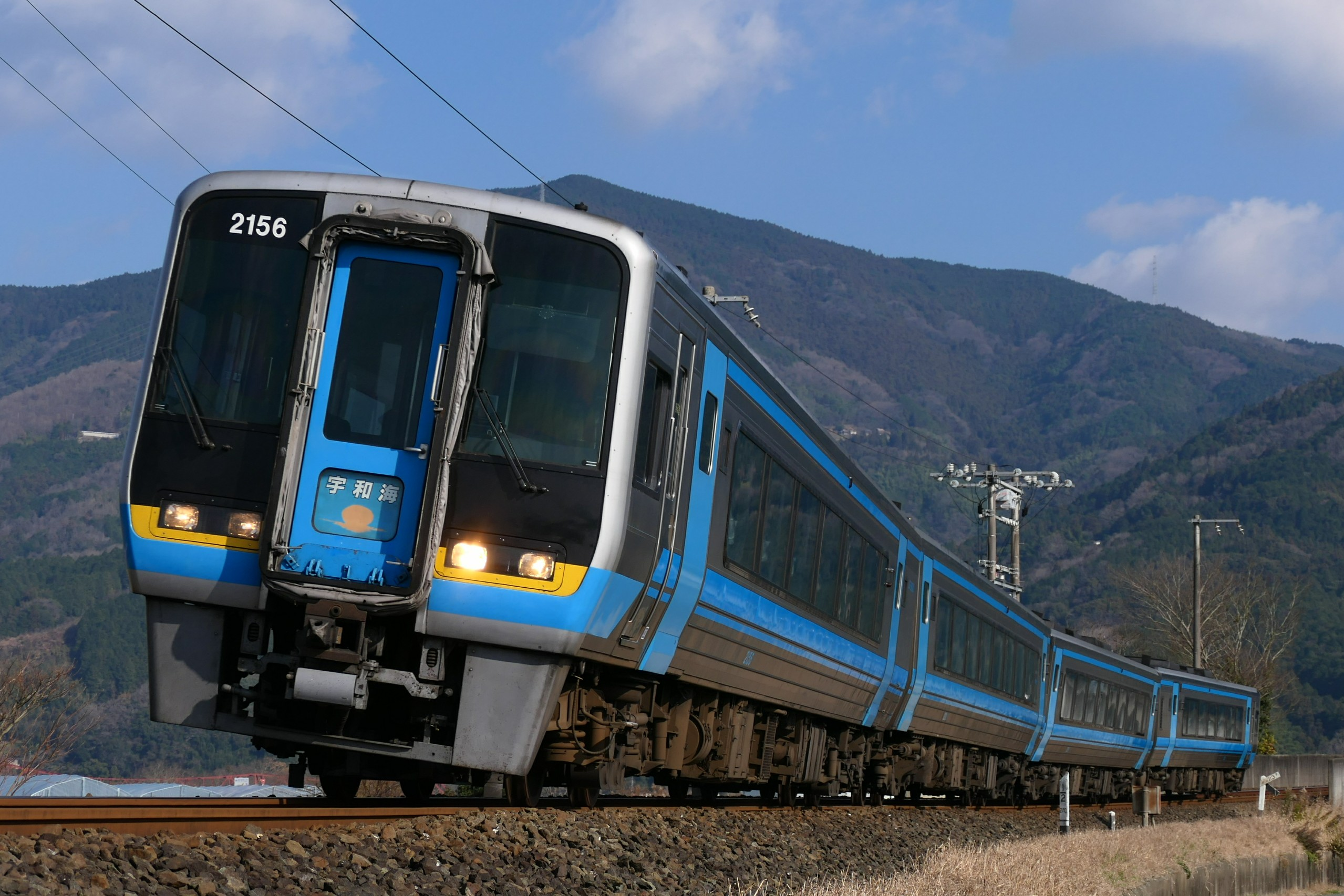
- Uwakai limited express service on the line in January 2020

Overview
- Status: In operation
- Locale: Ehime Prefecture
- Termini: Uchiko; Niiya
- Stations: 4

Service
- Type: Heavy rail
- Operator(s): JR Shikoku

History
- Opened: 1920; 106 years ago

Technical
- Line length: 5.3 km (3.3 mi)
- Track gauge: 1,067 mm (3 ft 6 in)
- Electrification: None
- Operating speed: 110 km/h (68 mph)
Route map

The Uchiko Line (内子線, Uchiko-sen) is the name of a short section of railway line that was originally a branch line before a section of it was upgraded and became part of the Yosan Line. It connects Uchiko in Uchiko, Kita District to Niiya in Ōzu, entirely in Ehime Prefecture on the island of Shikoku, Japan, and operated by the Shikoku Railway Company (JR Shikoku). The line is operationally part of the Yosan Line, and retains it separate name due to the Japanese naming convention which requires a formal change of name, which has not occurred in this case.

== Services ==
The line is served by Limited Express trains Matsuyama (Uwakai trains, 14 return trips and two Uwajima-bound trains a day) and Uwajima, and Local trains between Matsuyama or Iyoshi and Iyo-Ōzu, Yawatahama or Uwajima.

== History ==
The line was originally built by the Ehime Railway (愛媛鉄道, Ehime Tetsudō) as a 762 mm (2 ft 6 in) light railway line from Wakamiya Junction (若宮連絡所, Wakamiya-renraku-sho), near Nagahama-machi (the present Iyo-Nagahama) to Uchiko, opening on May 1, 1920.

On October 1, 1933, the line (along with the Ehime Railway Main Line) was nationalised and the name Ehime Line (愛媛線, Ehime-sen) was assigned to both lines. Both lines were regauged to 1,067 mm (3 ft 6 in), the national standard, on October 6, 1935, the same day when the Ehime Line was incorporated into the Yosan Main Line, which reached Iyo-Nagahama from Matsuyama. That day, the line from Gorō to Uchiko gained its own identity as the Uchiko Line, while the Yosan line was extended onwards from a junction at Gorō in stages to Uwajima between 19 September 1936 and 20 June 1945.

Freight operations ceased on December 1, 1971.

On November 25, 1985, the line was closed and the passenger service was replaced by buses to allow heavier rails to be laid, the railbed to be strengthened, and curves to be relaxed. The next year, on March 3, the upgraded line between Uchiko and a point 2.5 km west of Niiya (with new passing facilities at Niiya and relocated stations at Uchiko and Ikazaki), together with new sections of the Yosan Main Line from Mukaibara to Uchiko and the point 2.5 km west of Niiya to a new junction 2.5 km east of Iyo-Ōzu, with Centralised Traffic Control along all sections, opened as a shortcut route between Matsuyama and Uwajima. The curve section from the point 2.5 km west of Niiya to the junction at Gorō was closed.

In 1987 JNR was regionalised and privatised, and the Uchiko Line came under the control of Shikoku Railway Company, with Japan Freight Railway Company operating services on the line. JR Freight subsequently ceased to run services on the line on April 1, 2006.
