= Matsuyama Station (Ehime) =

Railway station in Matsuyama, Ehime Prefecture, Japan

Y55 U00 Matsuyama Station 松山駅
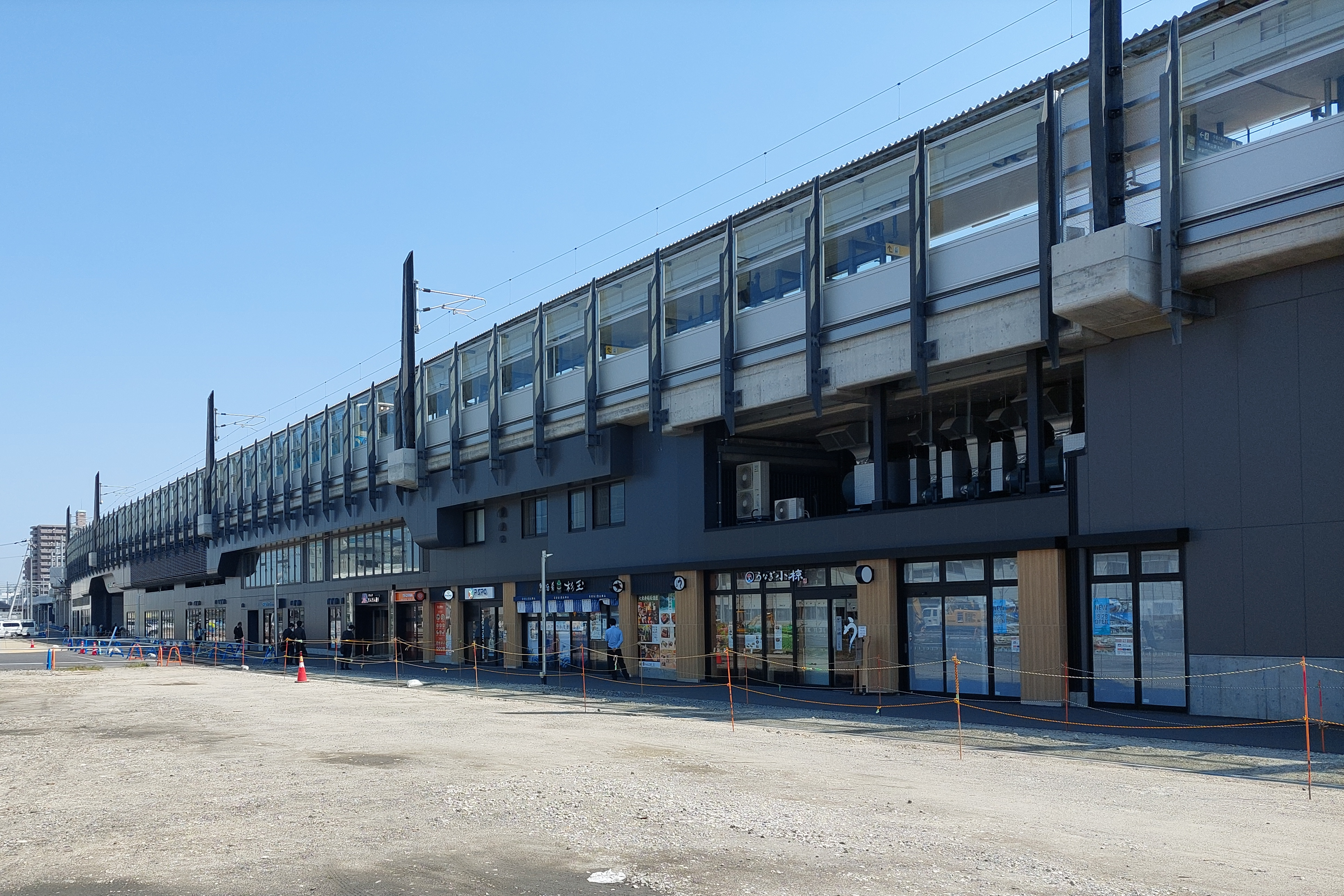
- Matsuyama Station, April 2025

General information
- Location: 1-chōme-14 Minamiedo, Matsuyama City, Ehime Prefecture 790-0062; Japan
- Coordinates: 33°50′25.4″N 132°45′5″E
- Operator: JR Shikoku
- Line: Yosan Line
- Distance: 194.4 km (120.8 mi) from Takamatsu
- Platforms: 2 side platforms

Construction
- Structure type: At grade

Other information
- Station code: Y55, U00

History
- Opened: 3 April 1927; 99 years ago
- Rebuilt: 2024

Passengers
- FY2023: 5,800

Services
Preceding station	JR Shikoku	Following station
Ichitsubo U01 towards Uwajima	Yosan Line	Mitsuhama Y54 towards Takamatsu
Location
- Location within Ehime Prefecture Location within Japan

Matsuyama Station (松山駅, Matsuyama-eki) is a passenger railway station located in the city of Matsuyama, Ehime Prefecture, Japan. It is operated by JR Shikoku and has the station number "Y46".

== Lines ==
Matsuyama Station is served by the JR Shikoku Yosan Line and is located 194.4 km from the beginning of the line at Takamatsu. Express trains head from Matsuyama to Okayama on Honshū, connecting with the Sanyō Shinkansen, and also to Takamatsu. The Okayama service is known as the Shiokaze and the Takamatsu service is known as the Ishizuchi (the name of the highest mountain on Shikoku). Southwards from Matsuyama, the Uwakai express train heads southwards to Uwajima. There are some through trains from Okayama and Takamatsu to Uwajima that stop at Matsuyama.

== Layout ==
Matsuyama Station has one side platform serving one track (No. 1) and is directly connected to the station building and an island platform serving two tracks (No. 2 and 3). The two platforms are connected by a footbridge. The station has a Midori no Madoguchi staffed ticket office.

=== Platforms ===
1	Yosan Line	for Yawatahama, Uwajima	Limited express Uwakai (no. 7)
1	Yosan Line	for Imabari, Tadotsu, Utazu, Takamatsu, Okayama	Limited expresses Shiokaze, Ishizuchi; Local trains
2	Yosan Line	for Yawatahama, Uwajima	Limited express Uwakai (all others)
2	Yosan Line	for Imabari, Tadotsu, Utazu, Takamatsu, Okayama	Local trains
3/4	Yosan Line	for Yawatahama, Uwajima	Local trains
3/4	Yosan Line	for Imabari, Tadotsu, Utazu, Takamatsu, Okayama	Local trains

== History ==
Matsuyama Station opened on April 3, 1927, when the San'yo Line (present day Yosan Line) of Japanese Government Railways was extended from Iyo-Hōjō from Matsuyama. With the opening of Matsuyama Station, all prefectural capitals but Naha were connected by the government railways. The name Matsuyama Station was previously used by the terminal of Iyo Railway, which was renamed Matsuyama City Station in March 1927.

In 2014, a redesigned, elevated station was proposed. On 2 July 2024, JR Shikoku announced that the new station and station building would enter service on 29 September 2024. The elevated station, as the first major renovation in 71 years, eliminated eight railroad crossings and added one additional platform. Remaining grade separation and construction continued into 2025.

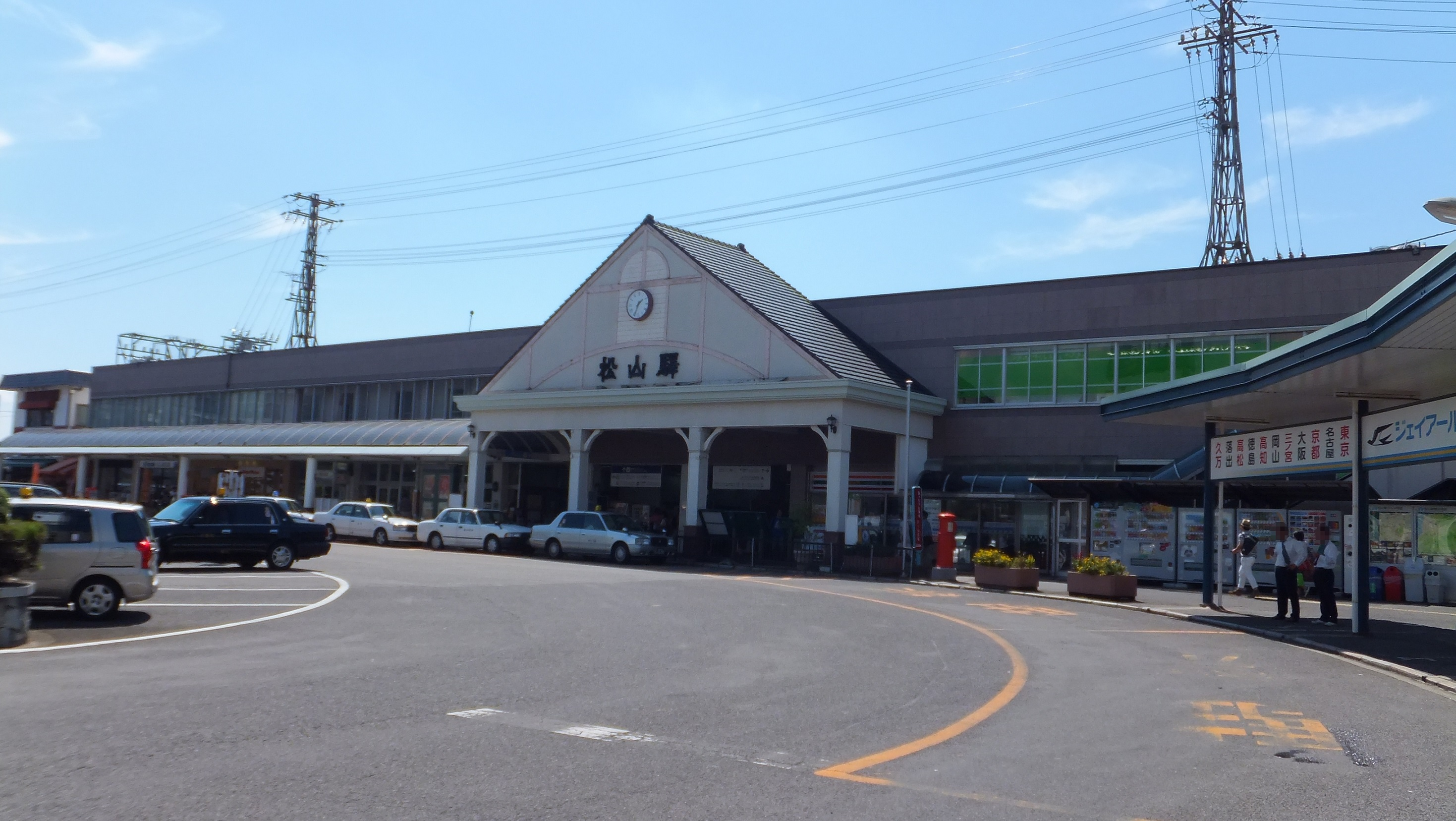
Matsuyama Station (September 2015)

== Surrounding area ==
- Matsuyama Ekimae Iyotetsu tram stop
- Matsuyama Chamber of Commerce and Industry
- Matsuyama District Government Building
- Matsuyama District Legal Affairs Bureau

== See also ==
- List of railway stations in Japan
