= Iyo-Iwaki Station =

Railway station in Seiyo, Ehime Prefecture, Japan

U20 Iyo-Iwaki Station 伊予石城駅
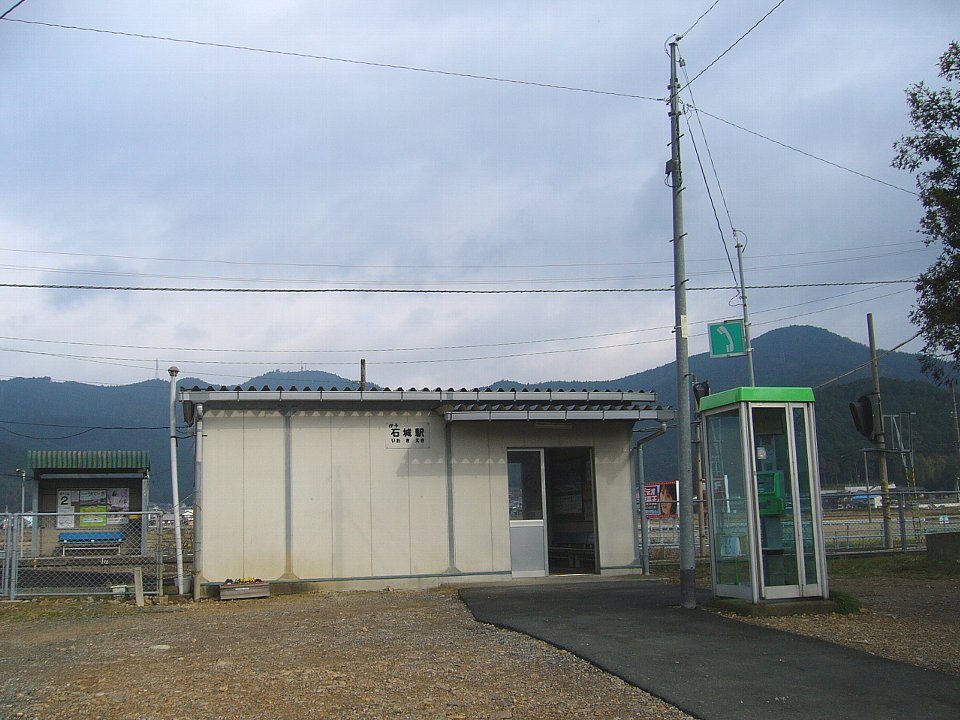
- Iyo-Iwaki Station in December 2006

General information
- Location: Uwacho Iwaki, Seiyo City, Ehime Prefecture 797-0026; Japan
- Coordinates: 33°23′30″N 132°28′22″E
- Operator: JR Shikoku
- Line: Yosan Line
- Distance: 266.1 km (165.3 mi) from Takamatsu
- Platforms: 2 side platforms
- Tracks: 2

Construction
- Structure type: At grade
- Parking: Available
- Accessible: Yes - platforms linked by ramps and level crossing

Other information
- Status: Unstaffed
- Station code: U20

History
- Opened: 20 June 1945; 81 years ago

Passengers
- FY2019: 32

Services
Preceding station	JR Shikoku	Following station
Kami-Uwa U21 towards Uwajima	Yosan Line	Futaiwa U19 towards Takamatsu
Location
- Location within Ehime Prefecture Location within Japan

Iyo-Iwaki Station (伊予石城駅, Iyo-Iwaki-eki) is a passenger railway station located in the city of Seiyo, Ehime Prefecture, Japan. It is operated by JR Shikoku and has the station number "U20".

== Lines ==
Iyo-Iwaki Station is served by the JR Shikoku Yosan Line and is located 266.1 km from the beginning of the line at Takamatsu. Only local trains serve the station. Eastbound local trains terminate at Matsuyama. Connections with other services are needed to travel further east of Matsuyama on the line.

== Layout ==
The station, which is unstaffed, consists of two opposed side platforms serving two tracks. Track 2 is a through-track while track 1 is a passing loop. A small station building on the side of track 1 serves as a waiting room. Access to the opposite platform is by means of ramps and a level crossing. A bike shed is provided near the station.

== History ==
Iyo-Iwaki Station was opened on 20 June 1945. It was among a string of three intermediate stations which were set up when the then Yosan Mainline was extended westwards from Yawatahama to link up with track of the then Uwajima Line at Unomachi. This was the final phase of the extension of the Yosan Mainline which connected Takamatsu with Uwajima. At that time, the station was operated by Japanese Government Railways (JGR), later becoming Japanese National Railways (JNR). With the privatization of JNR on 1 April 1987, control of the station passed to JR Shikoku.

== Surrounding area ==
- Mikame Shrine
- Seiyo Municipal Ishiki Elementary School

== See also ==
- List of railway stations in Japan
