= Tachima Station =

Railway station in Uwajima, Ehime Prefecture, Japan

U24 Tachima Station 立間駅
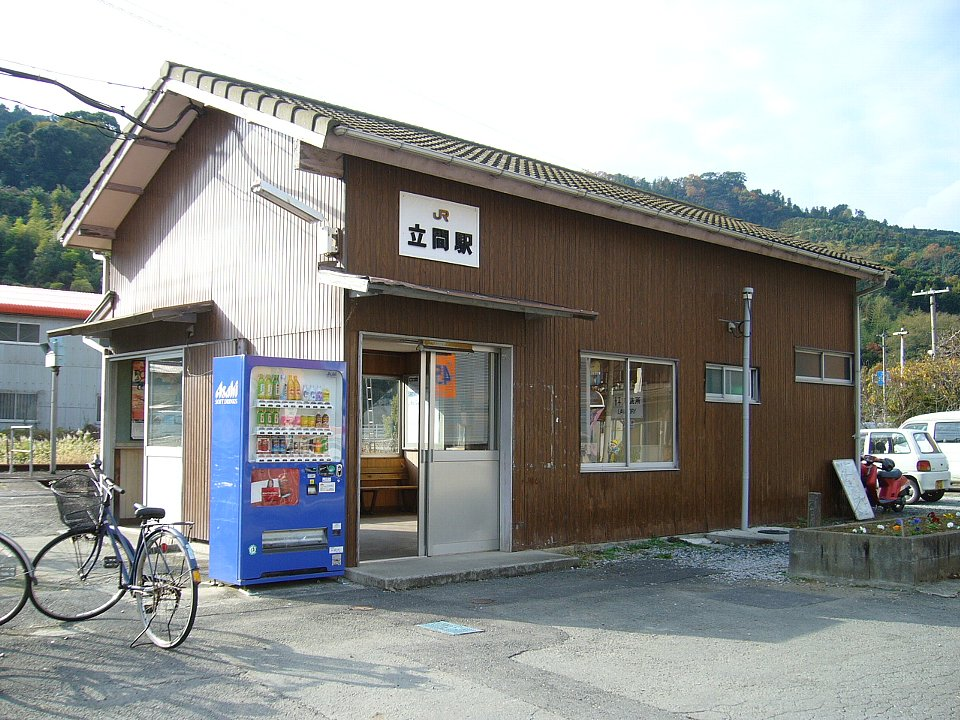
- Tachima Station, December 2006

General information
- Location: Yoshidacho Tachima, Uwajima City, Ehime Prefecture 799-3730; Japan
- Coordinates: 33°17′50″N 132°32′21″E
- Operator: JR Shikoku
- Line: Yosan Line
- Distance: 280.3 km (174.2 mi) from Takamatsu
- Platforms: 1 island platform
- Tracks: 2 + several sidings

Construction
- Structure type: At grade
- Accessible: Yes - platforms linked by ramps and a level crossing

Other information
- Status: Unstaffed
- Station code: U24

History
- Opened: 2 July 1941; 85 years ago

Passengers
- FY2019: 112

Services
Preceding station	JR Shikoku	Following station
Iyo-Yoshida U25 towards Uwajima	Yosan Line	Shimo-Uwa U23 towards Takamatsu
Location
- Location within Ehime Prefecture Location within Japan

Tachima Station (立間駅, Tachima-eki) is a passenger railway station located in the city of Uwajima, Ehime Prefecture, Japan. It is operated by JR Shikoku and has the station number "U24".

== Lines ==
The station is served by the JR Shikoku Yosan Line and is located 280.3 km from the beginning of the line at Takamatsu. Only local trains serve the station. Eastbound local trains terminate at Matsuyama. Connections with other services are needed to travel further east of Matsuyama on the line.

== Layout ==
The station, which is unstaffed, consists of an island platform serving two tracks. A small station building beside the tracks serves as a waiting room. Access to the island platform is by means of ramps and a level crossing. Several sidings and passing loops branch off the tracks on either side of the platform.

== History ==
The station was opened on 2 July 1941 as part of the then Uwajima Line which ran from Uwajima to Unomachi. Subsequently, the track of the then Yosan Mainline was extended westwards from Yawatahama and linked up with the Uwajima Line at Unomachi on 20 June 1945. The Uwajima Line and its stations, including Tachima, then became part of the Yosan Mainline from that date. At that time, the station was operated by Japanese Government Railways (JGR), later becoming Japanese National Railways (JNR). With the privatization of JNR on 1 April 1987, control of the station passed to JR Shikoku.

== Surrounding area ==
- Hoketsu Pass
- Tatsuma Ekimae Bus Stop
- Tatsuma Post Office.

== See also ==
- List of railway stations in Japan
