= Iyo-Yoshida Station =

Railway station in Uwajima, Ehime Prefecture, Japan

U25 Iyo-Yoshida Station 伊予吉田駅
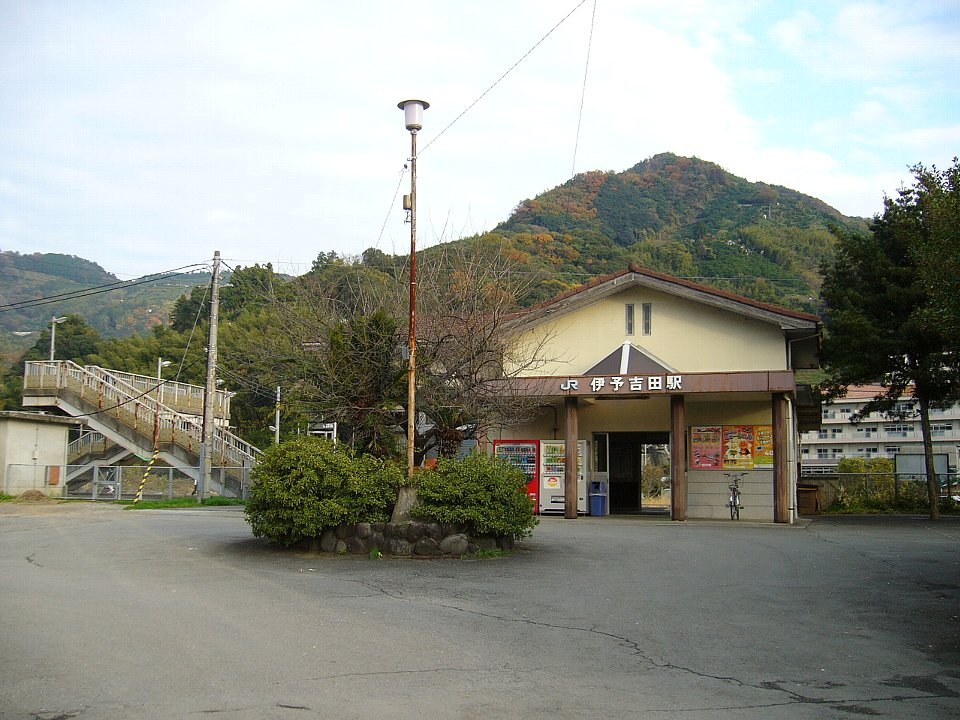
- Iyo-Yoshida Station, December 2006

General information
- Location: Yoshidacho Tachimajiri, Uwajima City, Ehime Prefecture 799-3710; Japan
- Coordinates: 33°16′23″N 132°32′38″E
- Operator: JR Shikoku
- Line: Yosan Line
- Distance: 283.0 km (175.8 mi) from Takamatsu
- Platforms: 2 side platforms
- Tracks: 2

Construction
- Structure type: At grade
- Accessible: No - platforms linked by footbridge

Other information
- Status: Unstaffed
- Station code: U25

History
- Opened: 2 July 1941; 85 years ago

Passengers
- FY2019: 218

Services
Preceding station	JR Shikoku	Following station
Takamitsu U26 towards Uwajima	Yosan Line	Tachima U24 towards Takamatsu
Location
- Location within Ehime Prefecture Location within Japan

Iyo-Yoshida Station (伊予吉田駅, Iyo-Yoshida-eki) is a passenger railway station located in the city of Uwajima, Ehime Prefecture, Japan. It is operated by JR Shikoku and has the station number "U25".

== Lines ==
Iyo-Yoshida Station is served by the JR Shikoku Yosan Line and is located 283 kilometres (176 mi) from the beginning of the line at Takamatsu. Only local trains serve the station. Eastbound local trains terminate at Matsuyama. Connections with other services are needed to travel further east of Matsuyama on the line.

The Uwakai limited express train, which runs between Matsuyama and Uwajima, stops at this station.

== Layout ==
The station consists of two opposed side platforms serving two tracks. A station building, which is now unstaffed, serves as a waiting room. Access to the opposite platform is by means of a footbridge.

== Adjacent stations ==
«	Service	»
JR Limited Express Services
Unomachi	Uwakai	Uwajima

== History ==
The station was opened on 2 July 1941 as part of the then Uwajima Line which ran from Uwajima to Unomachi. Subsequently, the track of the then Yosan Mainline was extended westwards from Yawatahama and linked up with the Uwajima Line at Unomachi on 20 June 1945. The Uwajima Line and its stations, including Iyo-Yoshida, then became part of the Yosan Mainline from that date. At that time, the station was operated by Japanese Government Railways (JGR), later becoming Japanese National Railways (JNR). With the privatization of JNR on 1 April 1987, control of the station passed to JR Shikoku.

== Surrounding area ==
- Yoshida Bay
- Uwajima City Yoshida Branch (former Yoshida Town Hall)
- Ehime Prefectural Yoshida High School

== See also ==
- List of railway stations in Japan
