= Shimo-Uwa Station =

Railway station in Seiyo, Ehime Prefecture, Japan

U23 Shimo-Uwa Station 下宇和駅
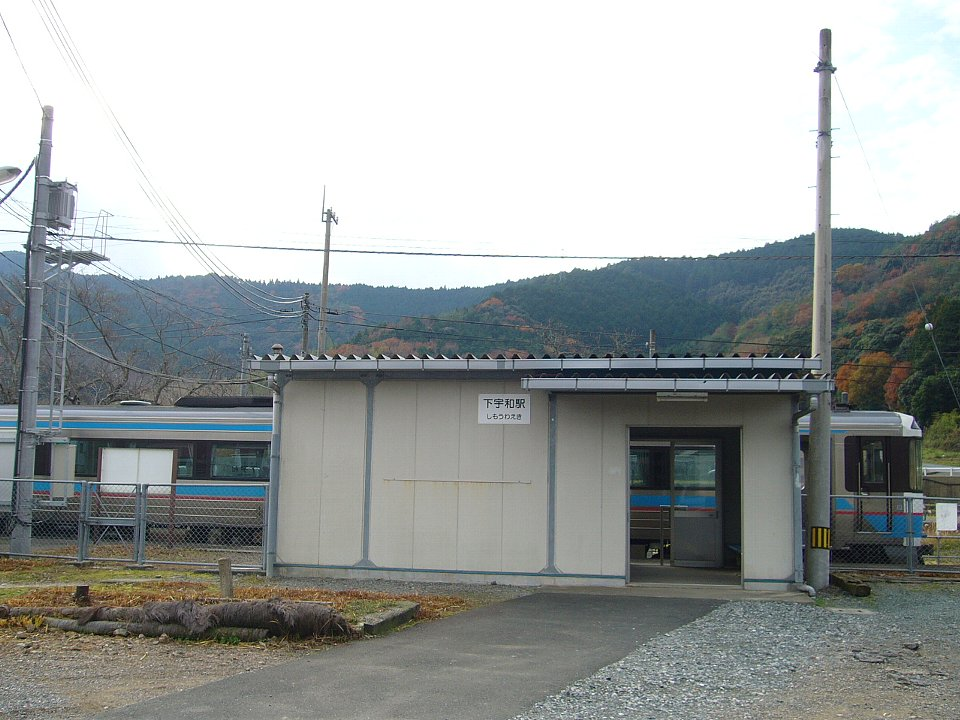
- Shimo-Uwa Station, December 2006

General information
- Location: Uwacho Kaida, Seiyo City, Ehime Prefecture 797-0012; Japan
- Coordinates: 33°20′59″N 132°31′52″E
- Operator: JR Shikoku
- Line: Yosan Line
- Distance: 273.7 km (170.1 mi) from Takamatsu
- Platforms: 2 side platforms
- Tracks: 2

Construction
- Structure type: At grade
- Cycle facilities: Bike shed
- Accessible: Yes - platforms linked by ramps and a level crossing

Other information
- Status: Unstaffed
- Station code: U23

History
- Opened: 2 July 1941; 85 years ago

Passengers
- FY2019: 26

Services
Preceding station	JR Shikoku	Following station
Tachima U24 towards Uwajima	Yosan Line	Unomachi U22 towards Takamatsu
Location
- Location within Ehime Prefecture Location within Japan

Shimo-Uwa Station (下宇和駅, Shimouwa-eki) is a passenger railway station located in the city of Seiyo, Ehime Prefecture, Japan. It is operated by JR Shikoku and has the station number "U23".

== Lines ==
Shimo-Uwa Station is served by the JR Shikoku Yosan Line and is located 273.7 km from the beginning of the line at Takamatsu. Only local trains serve the station. Eastbound local trains terminate at Matsuyama. Connections with other services are needed to travel further east of Matsuyama on the line.

== Layout ==
The station, which is unstaffed, consists of two opposed side platforms serving two tracks. A small station building serves as a waiting room. Access to the opposite platform is by means of ramps and a level crossing. A bike shed is provided nearby.

== History ==
Shimo-Uwa Station was opened on 2 July 1941 as part of the then Uwajima Line which ran from Uwajima to Unomachi. Subsequently, the track of the then Yosan Mainline was extended westwards from Yawatahama and linked up with the Uwajima Line at Unomachi on 20 June 1945. The Uwajima Line and its stations, including Shimo-uwa, then became part of the Yosan Mainline from that date. At that time, the station was operated by Japanese Government Railways (JGR), later becoming Japanese National Railways (JNR). With the privatization of JNR on 1 April 1987, control of the station passed to JR Shikoku.

== Surrounding area ==
- Hoketsu Pass
- Seiyo City Minata Elementary School

== See also ==
- List of railway stations in Japan
