= Kami-Uwa Station =

Railway station in Seiyo, Ehime Prefecture, Japan

U21 Kami-Uwa Station 上宇和駅
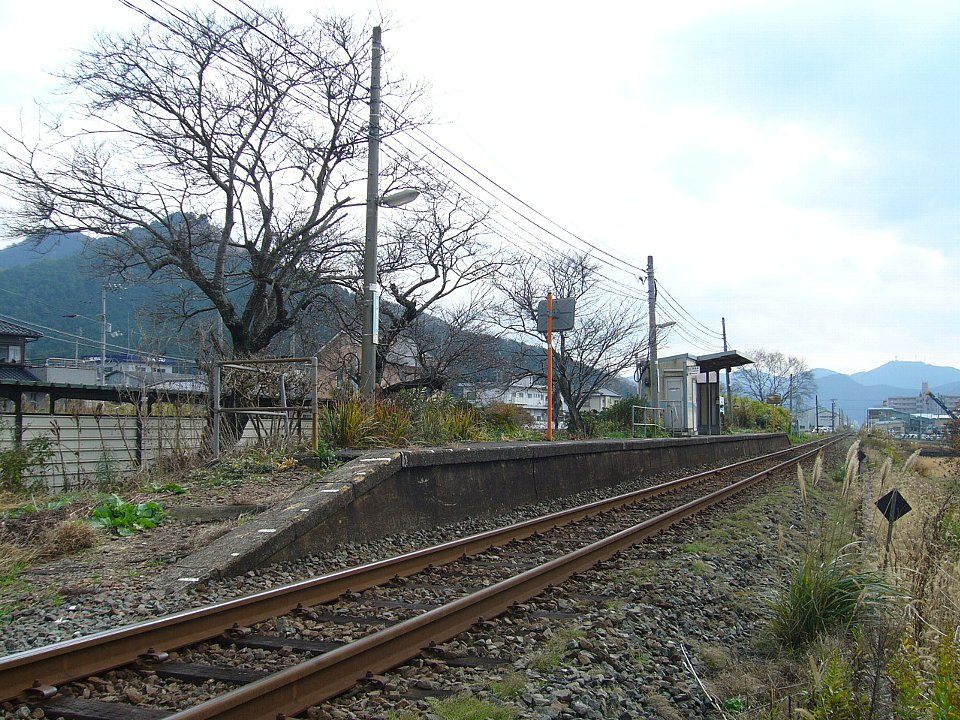
- Kami-Uwa Station, December 2006

General information
- Location: Uwacho Shimomatsuba, Seiyo City, Ehime Prefecture 797-0018; Japan
- Coordinates: 33°22′48″N 132°30′04″E
- Operator: JR Shikoku
- Line: Yosan Line
- Distance: 269.1 km (167.2 mi) from Takamatsu
- Platforms: 1 side platform
- Tracks: 1

Construction
- Structure type: At grade
- Cycle facilities: Bike shed
- Accessible: No - steps to platform

Other information
- Status: Unstaffed
- Station code: U21

History
- Opened: 20 June 1945; 81 years ago

Passengers
- FY2019: 152

Services
Preceding station	JR Shikoku	Following station
Unomachi U22 towards Uwajima	Yosan Line	Iyo-Iwaki U20 towards Takamatsu
Location
- Location within Ehime Prefecture Location within Japan

Kami-Uwa Station (上宇和駅, Kamiuwa-eki) is a passenger railway station located in the city of Seiyo, Ehime Prefecture, Japan. It is operated by JR Shikoku and has the station number "U21".

== Lines ==
Kami-Uwa Station is served by the JR Shikoku Yosan Line and is located 269.1 km from the beginning of the line at Takamatsu. Only local trains serve the station. Eastbound local trains terminate at Matsuyama. Connections with other services are needed to travel further east of Matsuyama on the line.

== Layout ==
The station, which is unstaffed, consists of a side platform serving a single track. There is no station building, only a shelter on the platform for waiting passengers. A short flight of steps leads up to the platform from the access road. A bike shed is provided near the station.

== History ==
The station was opened on 20 June 1945. It was among a string of three intermediate stations which were set up when the then Yosan Mainline was extended westwards from Yawatahama to link up with track of the then Uwajima Line at Unomachi. This was the final phase of the extension of the Yosan Mainline which connected Takamatsu with Uwajima. At that time, the station was operated by Japanese Government Railways (JGR), later becoming Japanese National Railways (JNR). With the privatization of JNR on 1 April 1987, control of the station passed to JR Shikoku.

== Surrounding area ==
- Japan National Route 56

== See also ==
- List of railway stations in Japan
