= Takamitsu Station =

Railway station in Uwajima, Ehime Prefecture, Japan

U26 Takamitsu Station 高光駅
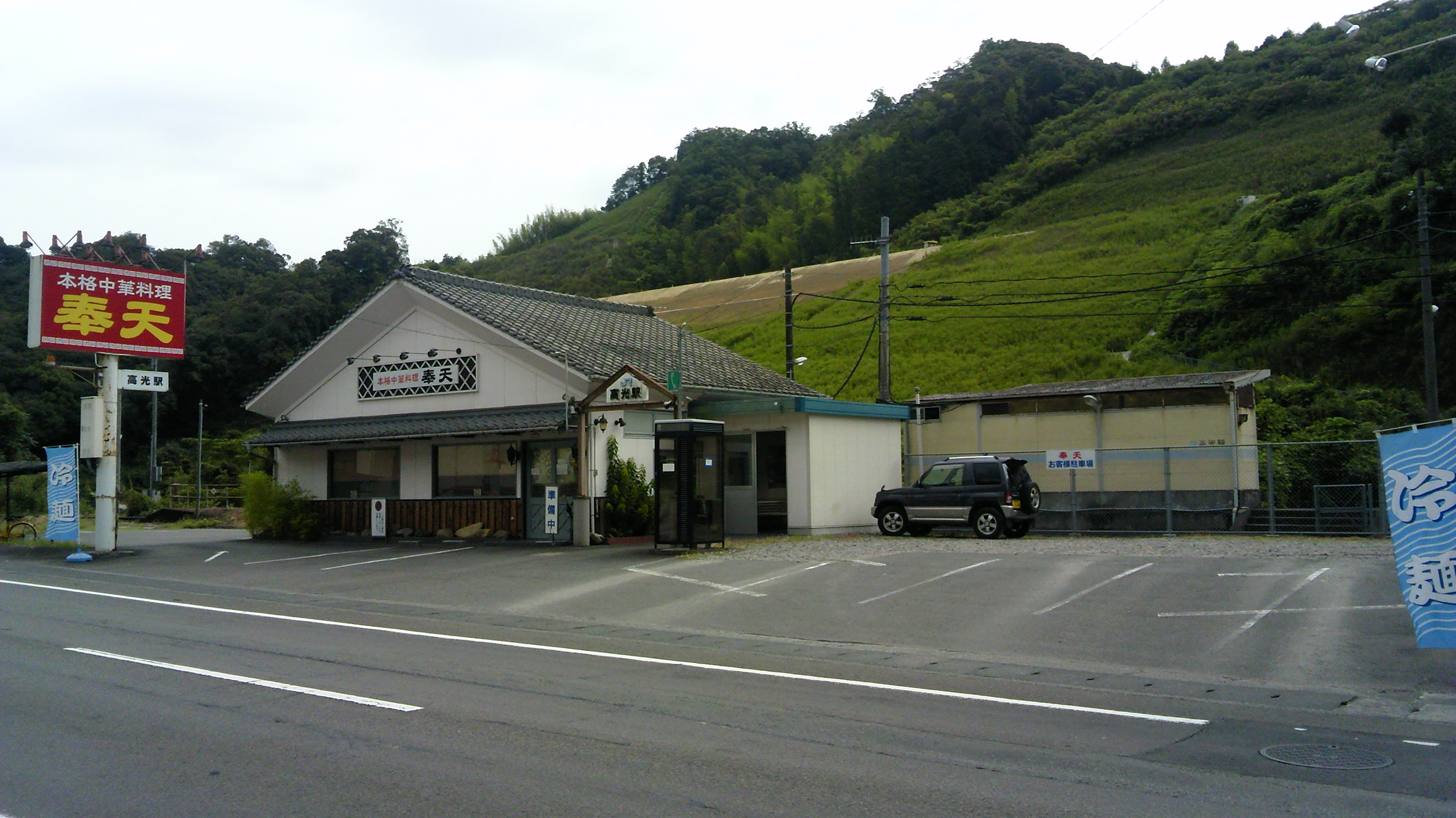
- Takamitsu Station in 2011

General information
- Location: Ibukicho, Uwajima-shi, Ehime-ken 798-0022; Japan
- Coordinates: 33°15′22″N 132°34′26″E
- Operator: JR Shikoku
- Line: Yosan Line
- Distance: 287.6 km (178.7 mi) from Takamatsu
- Platforms: 1 side platform
- Tracks: 1

Construction
- Structure type: At grade
- Parking: Available
- Cycle facilities: Bike shed

Other information
- Status: Unstaffed
- Station code: U26

History
- Opened: 2 July 1941; 85 years ago

Passengers
- FY2019: 2

Services
Preceding station	JR Shikoku	Following station
Kita-Uwajima U27 G46 towards Uwajima	Yosan Line	Iyo-Yoshida U25 towards Takamatsu
Location
- Location within Ehime Prefecture Location within Japan

Takamitsu Station (高光駅, Takamitsu-eki) is a passenger railway station located in the city of Uwajima, Ehime Prefecture, Japan. It is operated by JR Shikoku and has the station number "U26".

== Lines ==
Takamitsu Station is served by the JR Shikoku Yosan Line and is located 287.6 km from the beginning of the line at Takamatsu. Only local trains serve the station. Eastbound local trains terminate at Matsuyama. Connections with other services are needed to travel further east of Matsuyama on the line.

== Layout ==
The station consists of a side platform serving a single track. There is no station building, only a shelter for waiting passengers. Limited parking is available at the station forecourt. A bike shed is also available.

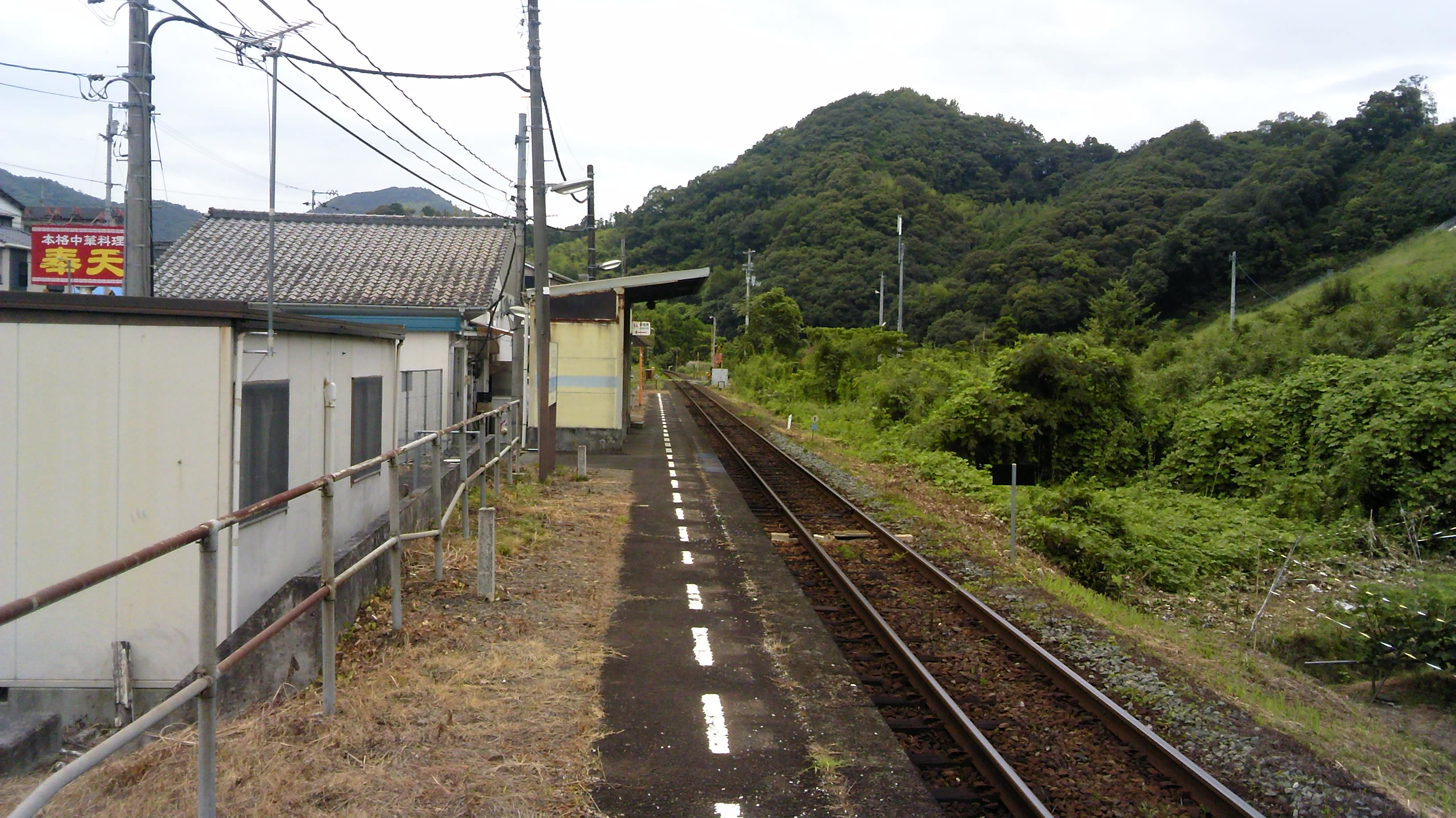
A view of the station platform.

== History ==
The station was opened on 2 July 1941 as part of the then Uwajima Line which ran from Uwajima to Unomachi. Subsequently, the track of the then Yosan Mainline was extended westwards from Yawatahama and linked up with the Uwajima Line at Unomachi on 20 June 1945. The Uwajima Line and its stations, including Takamitsu, then became part of the Yosan Mainline from that date. At that time, the station was operated by Japanese Government Railways (JGR), later becoming Japanese National Railways (JNR). With the privatization of JNR on 1 April 1987, control of the station passed to JR Shikoku.

== Surrounding area ==
- Japan National Route 56

== See also ==
- List of railway stations in Japan
