= Futaiwa Station =

Railway station in Yawatahama, Ehime Prefecture, Japan

U19 Futaiwa Station 双岩駅
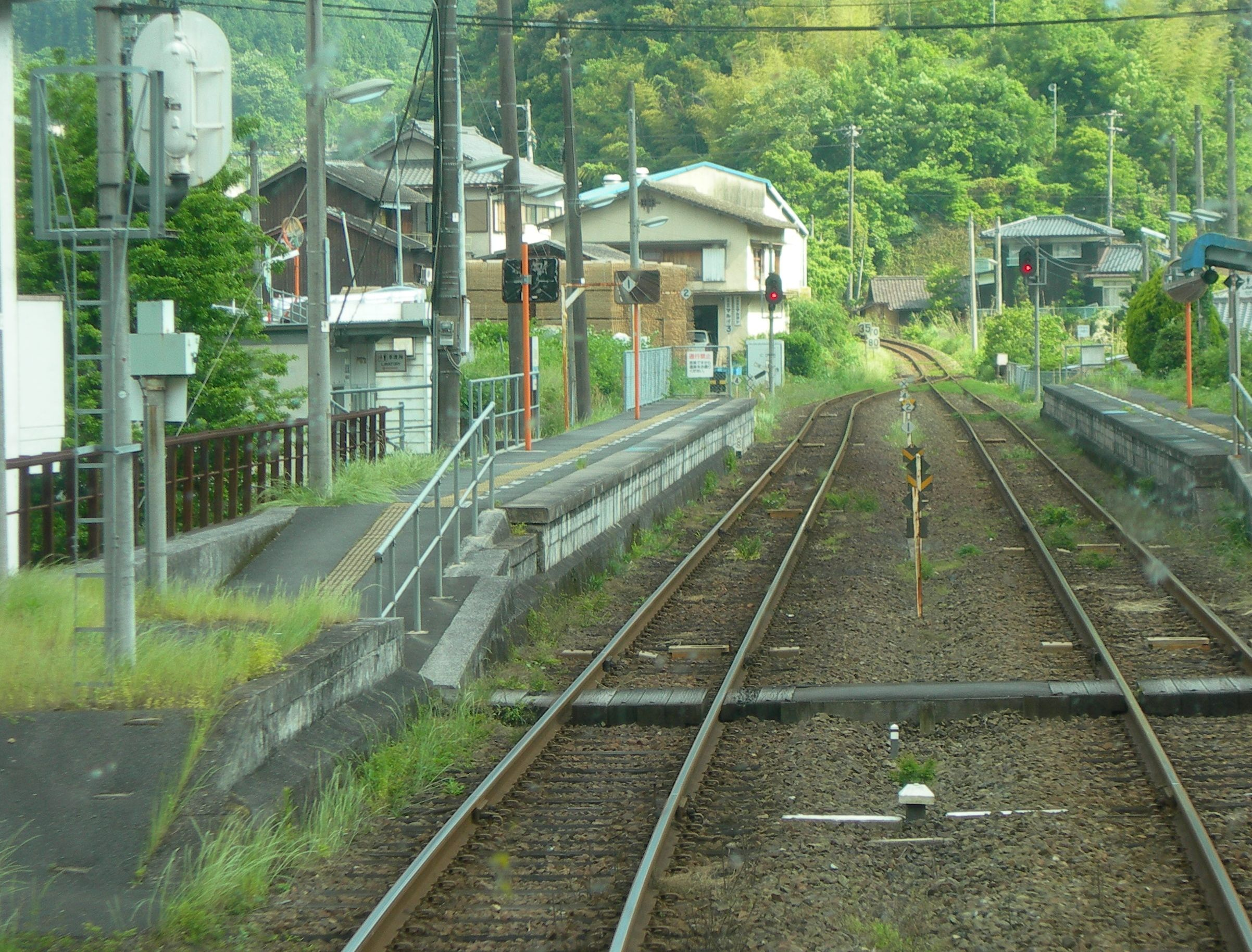
- Futaiwa Station in 2010

General information
- Location: Wakayama, Yawatahama City, Ehime Prefecture 796-8035; Japan
- Coordinates: 33°25′27″N 132°27′28″E
- Operator: JR Shikoku
- Line: Yosan Line
- Distance: 267.5 km (166.2 mi) from Takamatsu
- Platforms: 2 side platforms
- Tracks: 2

Construction
- Structure type: At grade
- Parking: Available
- Accessible: Yes - platforms linked by ramps and level crossing

Other information
- Status: Unstaffed
- Station code: U19

History
- Opened: 20 June 1945; 81 years ago

Passengers
- FY2019: 62

Services
| Preceding station | JR Shikoku | Following station |
|---|---|---|
| Iyo-Iwaki U20 towards Uwajima | Yosan Line | Yawatahama U18 towards Takamatsu |
Location
- Location within Ehime Prefecture Location within Japan

Futaiwa Station (双岩駅, Futaiwa-eki) is a passenger railway station located in the city of Yawatahama, Ehime Prefecture, Japan. It is operated by JR Shikoku and has the station number "U19".

== Lines ==
Futaiwa Station is served by the JR Shikoku Yosan Line and is located 267.5 km from the beginning of the line at Takamatsu. Only local trains serve the station. Eastbound local trains terminate at Matsuyama. Connections with other services are needed to travel further east of Matsuyama on the line.

== Layout ==
The station, which is unstaffed, consists of two opposed side platforms serving two tracks. Track 2 is a through-track while track 1 is a passing loop. A small station building on the side of track 1 serves as a waiting room. Access to the opposite platform is by means of ramps and a level crossing. Parking is available at the station forecourt.

== History ==
Futaiwa Station was opened on 20 June 1945. It was among a string of three intermediate stations which were set up when the then Yosan Mainline was extended westwards from Yawatahama to link up with track of the then Uwajima Line at Unomachi. This was the final phase of the extension of the Yosan Mainline which connected Takamatsu with Uwajima. At that time, the station was operated by Japanese Government Railways (JGR), later becoming Japanese National Railways (JNR). With the privatization of JNR on 1 April 1987, control of the station passed to JR Shikoku.

== Surrounding area ==
- Yawatahama City Hall Futiwa branch office
- Yawatahama Soiwa Post Office

== See also ==
- List of railway stations in Japan
