= Kita-Uwajima Station =

Railway station in Uwajima, Ehime Prefecture, Japan

U27 G46 Kita-Uwajima Station 北宇和島駅
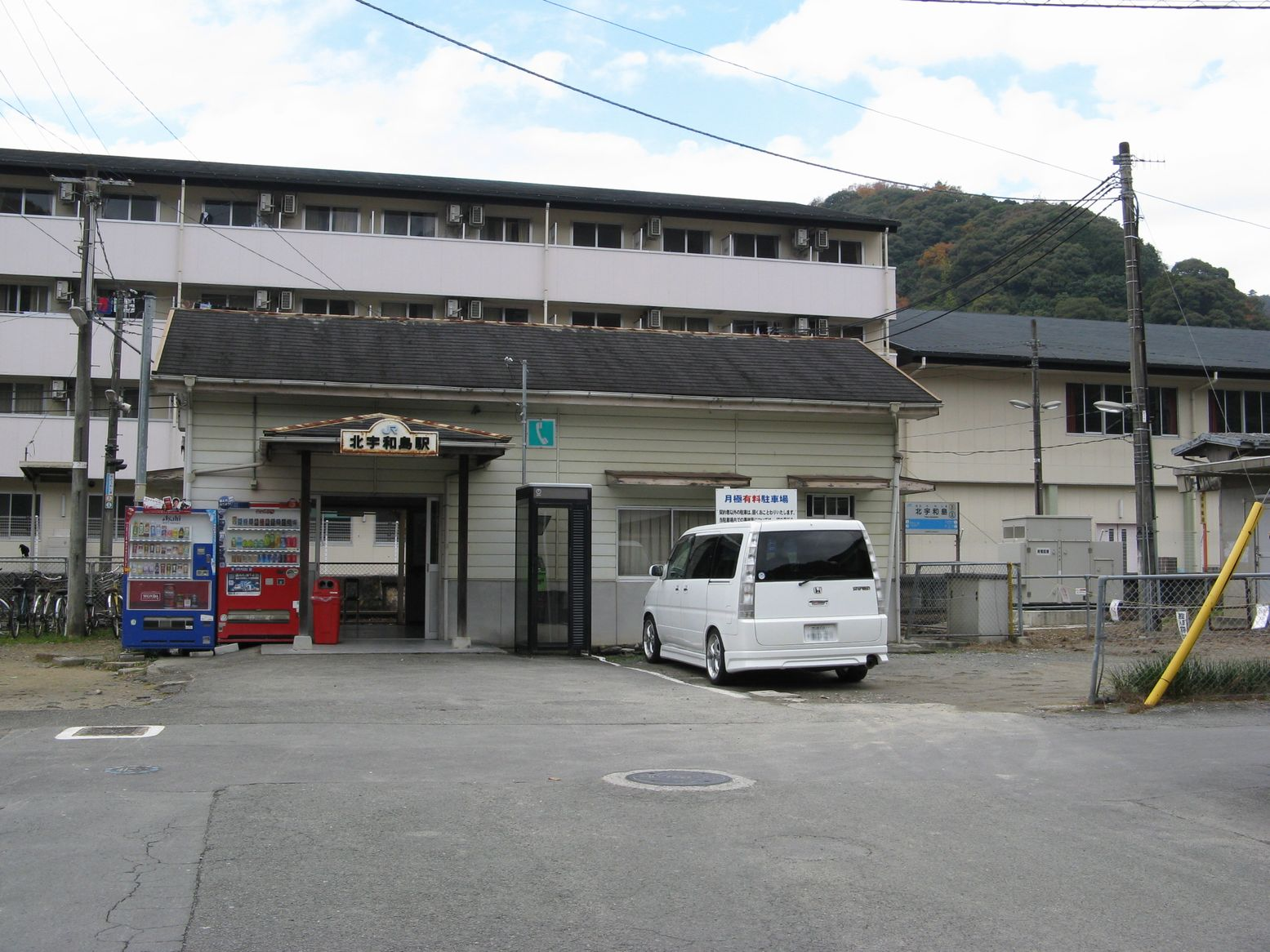
- Kita-Uwajima Station in 2008

General information
- Location: 1204 Ibukicho, Uwajima City, Ehime Prefecture 798-0022; Japan
- Coordinates: 33°14′19″N 132°34′12″E
- Operator: JR Shikoku
- Lines: Yodo Line; Yosan Line
- Distance: 76.3 km (47.4 mi) from Wakai; 296.1 km (184.0 mi) from Takamatsu
- Platforms: 1 island platform
- Tracks: 2

Construction
- Structure type: At grade
- Cycle facilities: Bike shed

Other information
- Status: Unstaffed
- Station code: G46; U27

History
- Opened: 2 July 1941; 85 years ago

Passengers
- FY2018: 94

Services
Preceding station	JR Shikoku	Following station
Uwajima U28 G47 Terminus	Yosan Line	Takamitsu U26 towards Takamatsu
Uwajima U28 G47 Terminus	Yodo Line	Muden G45 towards Kubokawa
Location
- Location within Ehime Prefecture Location within Japan

Kita-Uwajima Station (北宇和島駅, Kita-Uwajima-eki) is a passenger railway station located in the city of Uwajima, Ehime Prefecture, Japan. It is operated by JR Shikoku.

== Lines ==
The station is served by JR Shikoku's Yodo Line for which it is station number "G46" and is located 76.3 km from the beginning of the line at Wakai. It is also served by JR Shikoku's Yosan Line for which it is station number "U27" and is located 296.1 km from the beginning of the line at Takamatsu.

== Layout ==
The station, which is unstaffed, consists of a ground-level island platform serving two tracks. It is connected to the station building by a level crossing. A bike shed is provided across the road from the station.

== History ==
The station opened on July 2, 1941 with the opening the Uwajima Line (current Yodo Line) to the direction of Unomachi (current Yosan Line) the station under the control of Japanese Government Railways (JGR), later becoming Japanese National Railways (JNR). With the privatization of JNR on 1 April 1987, control passed to JR Shikoku.

== Surrounding area ==
- Matsuyama Expressway (Uwajima Road) Uwajima North IC

== See also ==
- List of railway stations in Japan
