= Muden Station =

Railway station in Uwajima, Ehime Prefecture, Japan

G45 Muden Station 務田駅
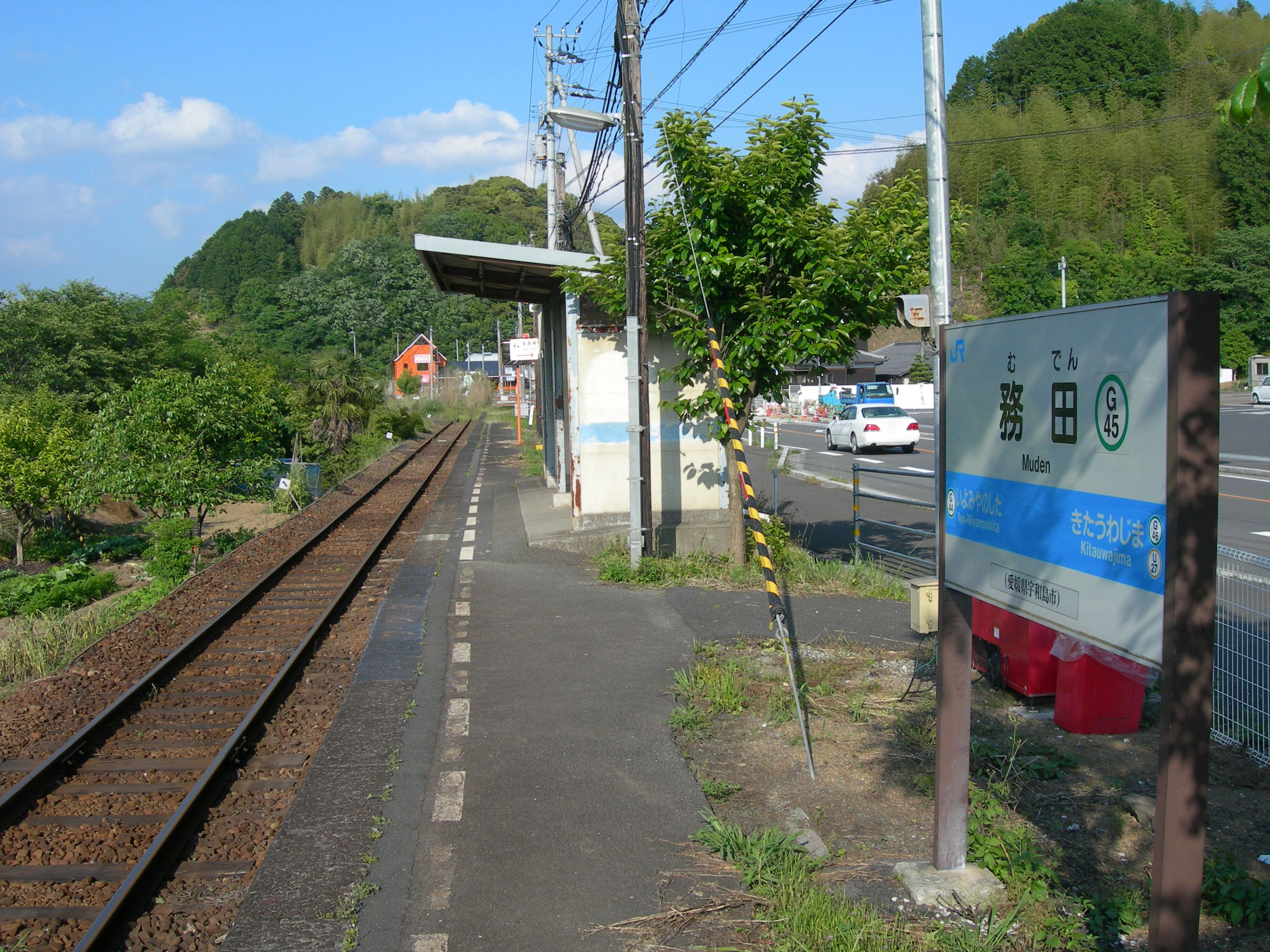
- Muden Station in 2010

General information
- Location: Mimachō Hazame, Uwajima-shi, Ehime-ken 798-1113; Japan
- Coordinates: 33°16′59″N 132°36′01″E
- Operator: JR Shikoku
- Line: ■ Yodo Line
- Distance: 70.0 km from Wakai
- Platforms: 1 side platform
- Tracks: 1

Construction
- Parking: Available
- Cycle facilities: Bike shed
- Accessible: Yes - ramp from access road to platform

Other information
- Status: Unstaffed
- Station code: G45

History
- Opened: 18 October 1914

Passengers
- FY2018: 62

Services
Preceding station	JR Shikoku	Following station
Kita-Uwajima G46 towards Uwajima	Yodo Line	Iyo-Miyanoshita G44 towards Kubokawa
Location
- Location within Ehime Prefecture Location within Japan

Muden Station (務田駅, Muden-eki) is a passenger railway station in the city of Uwajima, Ehime Prefecture, Japan. It is operated by JR Shikoku and has the station number "G45".

== Lines ==
The station is served by JR Shikoku's Yodo Line and is located 70.0 km from the beginning of the line at Wakai.

== Layout ==
The station, which is unstaffed, consists of a side platform serving a single track. A shelter is provided on the platform for waiting passengers. A short ramp leads up to the platform from the access road. A parking area and bike shed are provided.

== History ==
The station opened on 18 October 1914 as a through-station on the narrow-gauge line from Uwajima to Chikanaga owned by the Uwajima Railway (宇和島鉄道). With the nationalization of Uwajima Railway on 1 August 1933, the station came under the control of Japanese Government Railways (JGR), later becoming Japanese National Railways (JNR).

With the privatization of JNR on 1 April 1987, control passed to JR Shikoku.

== Surrounding area ==
- Ryūkōji (龍光寺), the 41st temple on the Shikoku Pilgrimage trail is about 1.5 km to the north of the station.

== See also ==
- List of railway stations in Japan
