= Takamitsu =

- Gender: Male

Origin
- Origin: Japanese
- Meaning: Different meanings depending on the kanji used

Takamitsu (written: 貴光, 峻光, 高光 or 崇光) is a masculine Japanese given name. Notable people with the name include:

- Fujiwara no Takamitsu (藤原 高光) (c. 939–994), Japanese poet
- Takamitsu Muraoka (村岡 崇光) (1938–2026), Japanese Hebraist
- Takamitsu Ota (太田 貴光) (born 1970), Japanese footballer
- Takamitsu Yoshino (吉野 峻光) (born 1989), Japanese footballer

== See also ==
- Takamitsu Station (高光駅, Takamitsu-eki), train station in Uwajima, Ehime Prefecture, Japan
- Tōru Takemitsu, Japanese composer
