= Tetchō Suehiro =

Japanese politician, novelist, and journalist

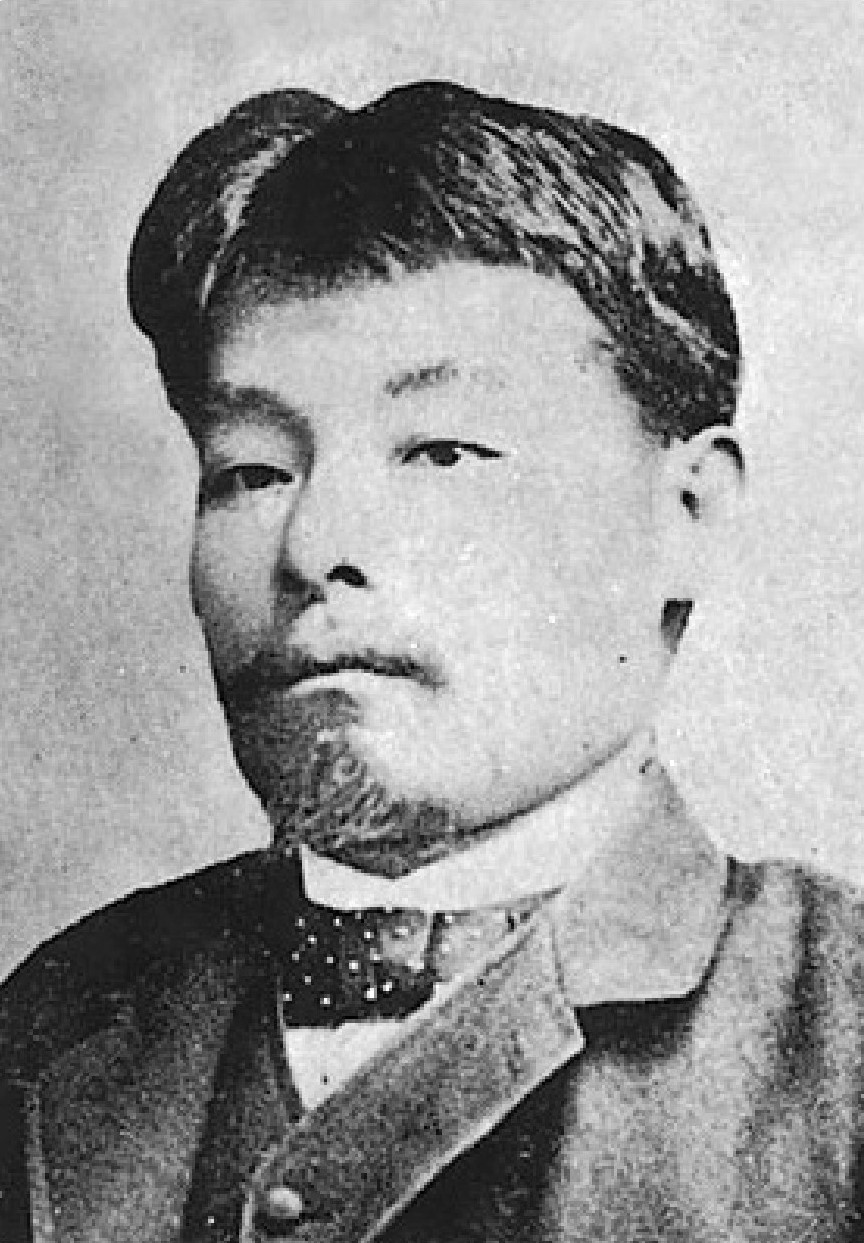
- Born: Yūjirō Suehiro; 15 March 1849; Uwajima, Ehime, Japan
- Died: 5 February 1896 (aged 46); Japan
- Occupations: Politician, novelist, journalist
- Writing career
- Genre: Novels
- Notable works: Setchūbai; Kakan'ō

Tetchou Suehiro (末広 鐵腸, Suehiro Tetchō; March 15, 1849 – February 5, 1896), born Yuujirou Suehiro (末広 雄次郎, Suehiro Yūjirō) was a Japanese politician, novelist, and journalist. He was proponent of the Freedom and People's Rights Movement.

Born of samurai lineage in what is now Ehime Prefecture, he was the second son of the family. His father, Teisuke, was an accountant. He graduated from a local samurai school and became a teacher in 1869. Thereafter, he moved to Tokyo and worked for the Ministry of Finance for six years before going into the newspaper business. He was imprisoned twice for challenging the existing free press laws and was instrumental in forming the first national political party. He wrote a political, proto-science fiction novel Setchūbai (Plum Blossoms in the Snow, 1886). The income from his books allowed him to travel to the United States and Europe in 1888, around which time he briefly became the travelling companion of Filipino propagandist and patriot José Rizal. He would later acknowledge Rizal's influence in another novel, Nanyo no daiharan (The Great Wave in the South Seas).

In 1890 he was elected in the first national election, but was later ousted because he left the Liberal Party. Suehiro was still a member of the Diet (Meiji 29) when he died in 1896 of tongue cancer and was buried in Ehime.

== Major works ==
Suehiro's major works include:

- Setchūbai (Plum Blossoms in the Snow, 1886)
- Kakan'ō (Songbirds Among Flowers, 1889)

== See also ==
- Japanese literature
- List of Japanese authors
- Bungou Stray Dogs, appears as an antagonist and a part of military police force the "Hunting Dogs"
