= Setchūbai =

1886 novel by Tetchō Suehiro

Seijishōsetsu: Setchūbai (政治小説: 雪中梅; "A Political Novel: Plum Blossoms in Snow") is an 1886 Japanese novel written by Tetchō Suehiro.

Kyoko Kurita wrote in "The Romantic Triangle in Meiji Literature" that the novel is "a simple Aesopian story (with a happy ending), in which the characters are mere tools to advocate the author's political convictions". Ozaki Yukio stated in his introduction of the novel that it is not merely a romance story but a modern Japanese novel; Kurita argued that this introduction was "generous".

The book has a sequel, Kakan'ō (花間鶯).

== Plot ==
The book begins on October 3, 2040 (Meiji 173) in Tokyo. Two unnamed men, a host and a guest, discuss how powerful and wealthy Japan has become. The host states that he does not understand how Japan recovered from poor conditions in 1880 (Meiji 13), in which Japan experienced political strife, and in the period 1883-1886 (Meiji 16-19), when political discussion had declined. The guest responds by showing two books, titled "Plum Blossoms in Snow" and "Songbirds Among Flowers." They describe the main character and his eventual wife, Kunino Motoi (国野 基) and Tominaga Haru (富永 春 or お春 O-haru). These notebooks were written by a professor and his wife. The convention involving a novel opening with a discussion among unnamed men was common in the Tokugawa period.

The primary story is set in the years 1886–1890 (Meiji 19–23). Kunino adopts an alias and moves to Tokyo in order to become involved in politics. He meets a former samurai and promises to marry the samurai's daughter, Haru, but decides not to meet her until he has established himself. However Kunino is forced to keep a low profile when the government enacts a round of persecution. Haru's parents die, and her only possession is a photograph of Kunino since her uncle has her parents' former possessions. In Meiji 19 she attends a speech given by Kunino, now ill and using his real name.

Haru decides to financially sponsor and support Kunino, who works to unite the different political groups in Japan, and assists him as he experiences financial difficulties and becomes incarcerated, despite the fact that her uncle wants her to marry another man. She does not learn of Kunino's former identity until she shows him the photograph. Haru's uncle reveals that her father had written a will which gives Kunino the family estate. They marry, and continue to be involved in politics.

== Characters ==
The main characters are: Kunino Motoi, a poor man who becomes a political activist and intends to become the leader of Japan; Tominaga Haru, an educated young woman who finances the Freedom and Popular Rights Movement and becomes involved with Kunino; and Kawagishi Hyōsui (川岸 萍水), an evil man who tries to become Haru's boyfriend. The names of all three characters are based on attributes chosen by Suehiro: Motoi's name means "foundation of a nation", Haru's name means "ever-lasting fortune and spring", and Kawagishi's name means "floating weed along a river bank."

== Development ==
The author himself had devoted his life to resolving differences among the Japanese political factions, and he had previously been incarcerated due to libel law violations; these aspects influenced the novel.

== Sequel ==
The sequel, written in 1888 and 1889, is Seijishōsetsu: Kakan'ō (政治小説: 花間鶯; "A Political Novel: A Nightingale Among the Flowers" or "Songbirds Among Flowers"), and it focuses on how Japan as a whole unifies. The country establishes a constitution and elections, and a political establishment is closed. It describes how the guest discovered the books in the distant future. The book's ending argues that the marriage between a wealthy benefactor and a political intellectual would cause the educated and the businesspeople to ally, causing democracy to form in Japan, a position advanced by the book's author.

== Legacy ==
It influenced the novel Future of a New China by Liang Qichao.
