= Uwajima =

Uwajima 宇和島市
- City
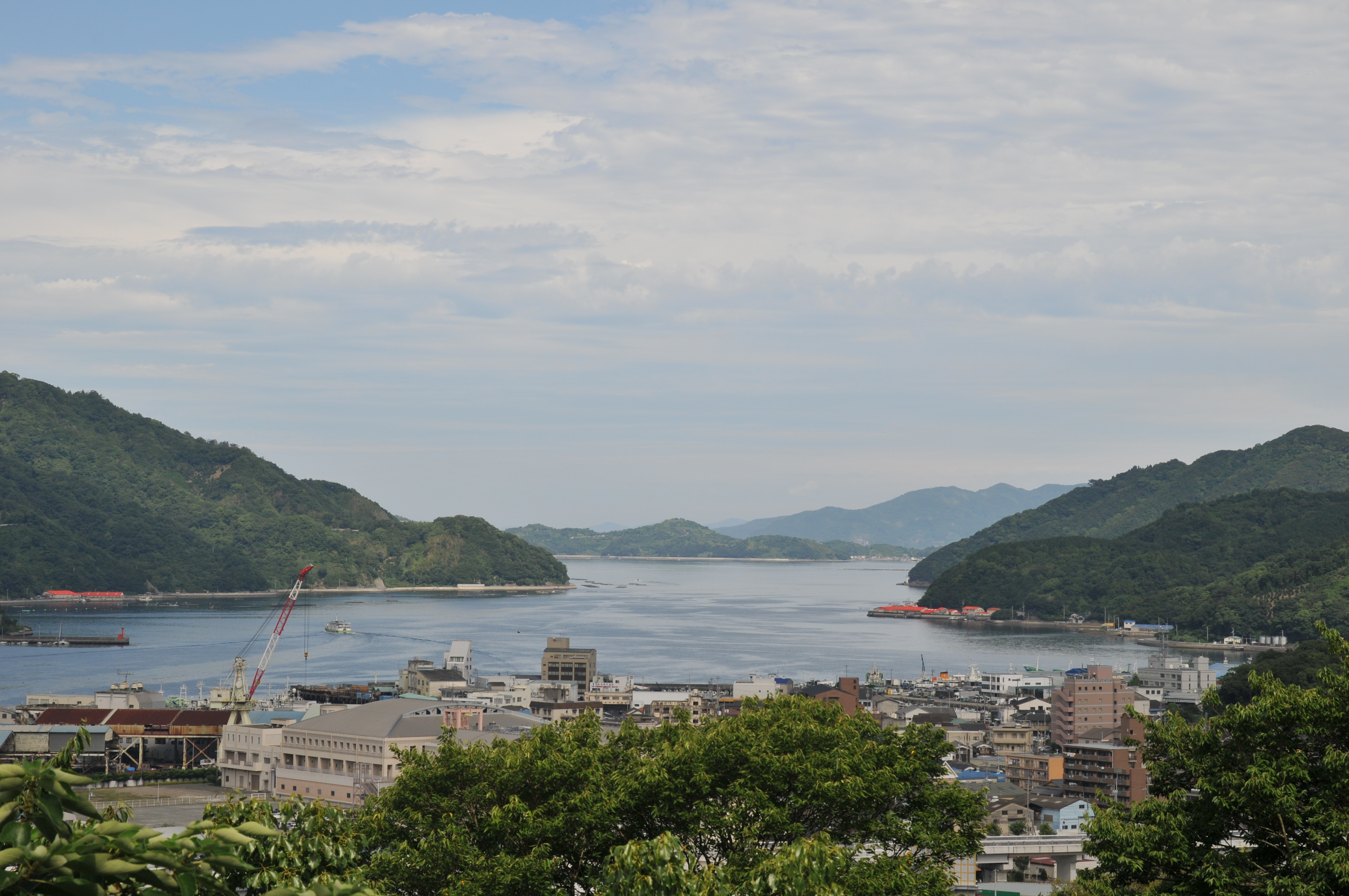
- View of Uwajima Bay and downtown Uwajima from Uwajima Castle

- Flag Emblem
- Location of Uwajima in Ehime Prefecture

- Location in Japan
- Coordinates: 33°13′N 132°34′E
- Country: Japan
- Region: Shikoku
- Prefecture: Ehime

Government
  - Mayor: Fumiaki Okahara (since 2013)

Area
  - Total: 468.19 km^{2} (180.77 sq mi)

Population (September 1, 2022)
  - Total: 70,440
  - Density: 150.5/km^{2} (389.7/sq mi)
- Time zone: UTC+09:00 (JST)
- City hall address: 1 Akebonochō, Uwajima-shi, Ehime-ken 798-8601
- Climate: Cfa
- Website: Official website
- Symbols
- Flower: Citrus unshiu
- Tree: Querus phillyraeoides

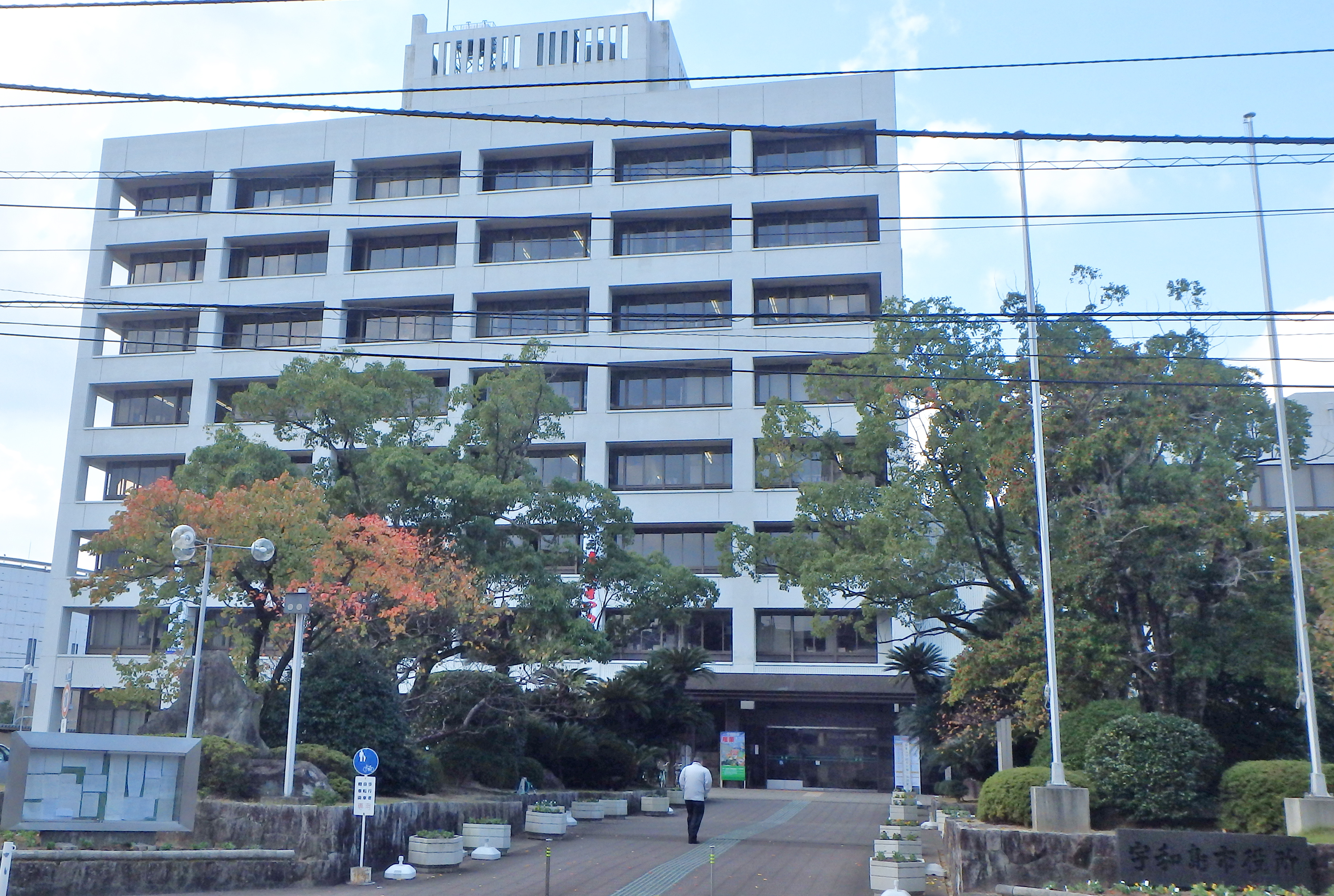
Uwajma City Hall

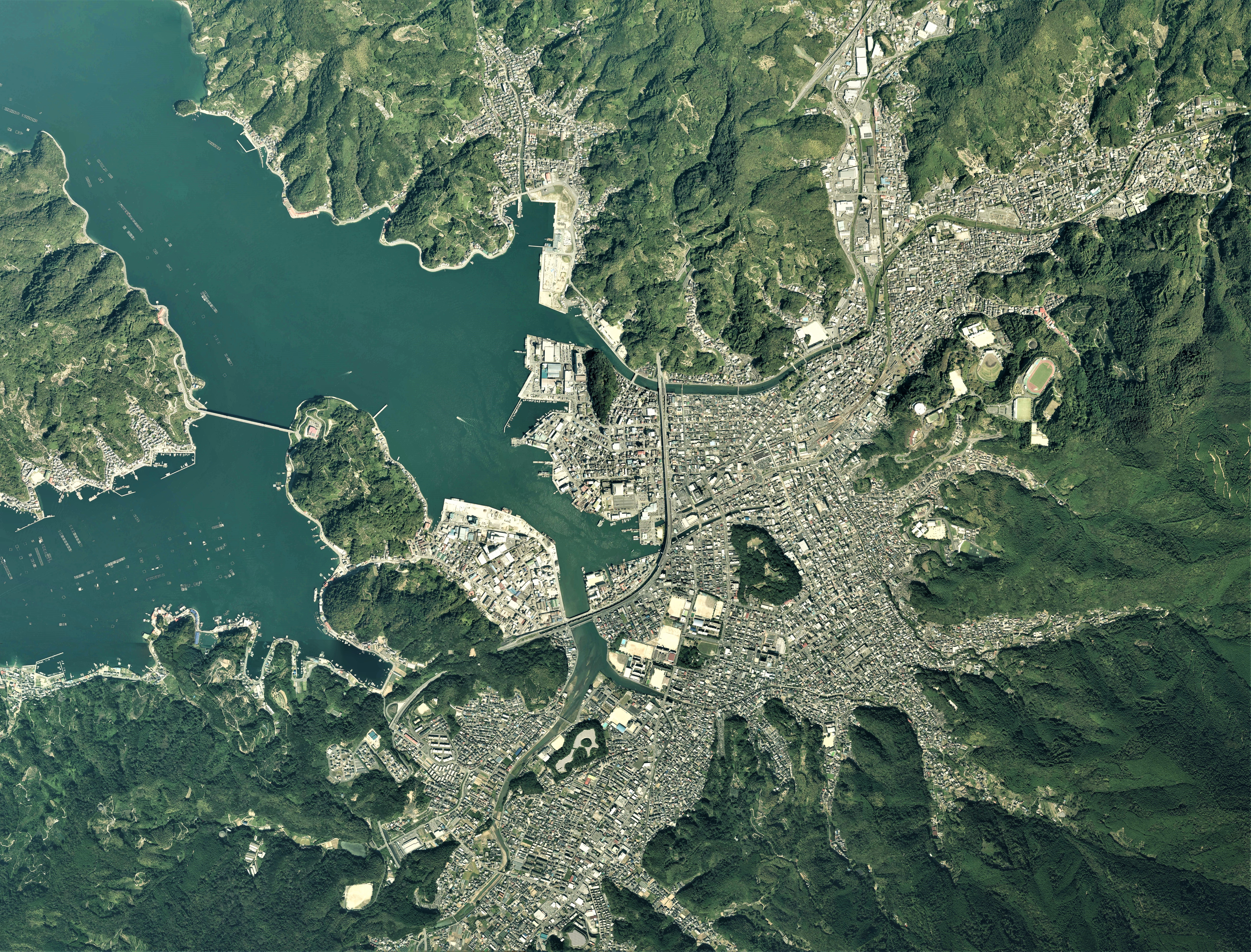
Aerial view of Uwajma city center

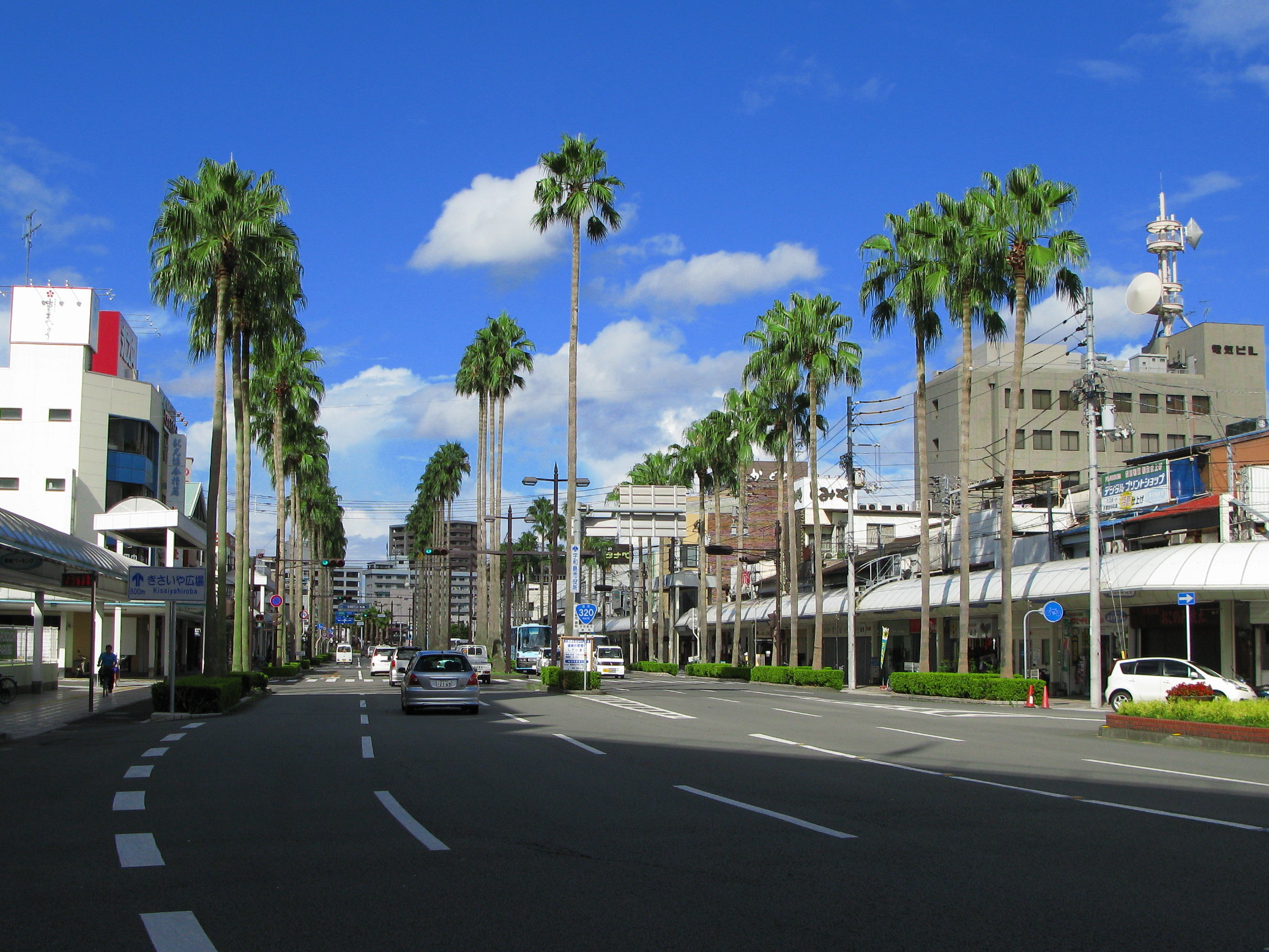
Japan National Route 320 in Uwajma city center

Uwajima (宇和島市, Uwajima-shi; Japanese pronunciation: [ɯ̈̀.β̞ä́.(ɟ̟͡)í.mä́(.ɕì)]) is a city located in Ehime Prefecture, Japan. As of 1 September 2022, the city had an estimated population of 70,440 in 35429 households and a population density of 150 persons per km^{2}. The total area of the city is 468.19 square kilometres (180.77 sq mi).

== Geography ==
Uwajima is located in southwestern Ehime Prefecture, facing the wide rias coastline and remote islands, Uwa Bay on the Seto Inland Sea to the east, and with the other three sides surrounded by mountains. Although it is actually located to the south-southeast of Yawatahama, as it is the terminus of the limited express train on the JR Shikoku Yosan Line, people other than local residents tend to think that it is the westernmost city in Ehime Prefecture.

=== Neighbouring municipalities ===
Ehime Prefecture

- Ainan
- Kihoku
- Matsuno
- Seiyo

Kōchi Prefecture

- Shimanto city
- Sukumo

=== Climate ===
Uwajima has a humid subtropical climate (Köppen climate classification Cfa) with hot summers and cool winters. Precipitation is significant throughout the year, but is highest from June to September.

Climate data for Uwajima (1991–2020 normals, extremes 1922–present)
Month	Jan	Feb	Mar	Apr	May	Jun	Jul	Aug	Sep	Oct	Nov	Dec	Year
Record high °C (°F)	22.5 (72.5)	23.7 (74.7)	27.7 (81.9)	30.0 (86.0)	31.7 (89.1)	35.9 (96.6)	40.2 (104.4)	38.4 (101.1)	36.1 (97.0)	33.0 (91.4)	28.4 (83.1)	24.3 (75.7)	40.2 (104.4)
Mean maximum °C (°F)	17.5 (63.5)	19.2 (66.6)	21.9 (71.4)	25.9 (78.6)	29.1 (84.4)	31.8 (89.2)	34.7 (94.5)	34.9 (94.8)	33.1 (91.6)	29.0 (84.2)	24.3 (75.7)	19.7 (67.5)	35.2 (95.4)
Mean daily maximum °C (°F)	11.3 (52.3)	12.3 (54.1)	15.6 (60.1)	20.4 (68.7)	24.3 (75.7)	26.7 (80.1)	31.0 (87.8)	32.2 (90.0)	29.0 (84.2)	24.5 (76.1)	19.1 (66.4)	13.8 (56.8)	21.7 (71.0)
Daily mean °C (°F)	7.0 (44.6)	7.6 (45.7)	10.7 (51.3)	15.3 (59.5)	19.5 (67.1)	22.8 (73.0)	26.8 (80.2)	27.7 (81.9)	24.5 (76.1)	19.3 (66.7)	14.1 (57.4)	9.1 (48.4)	17.0 (62.7)
Mean daily minimum °C (°F)	2.9 (37.2)	3.2 (37.8)	5.9 (42.6)	10.4 (50.7)	14.9 (58.8)	19.4 (66.9)	23.4 (74.1)	24.3 (75.7)	20.9 (69.6)	15.1 (59.2)	9.8 (49.6)	5.0 (41.0)	12.9 (55.3)
Mean minimum °C (°F)	−1.3 (29.7)	−1.5 (29.3)	−0.1 (31.8)	3.5 (38.3)	9.3 (48.7)	14.7 (58.5)	20.1 (68.2)	21.2 (70.2)	15.4 (59.7)	9.1 (48.4)	3.8 (38.8)	0.5 (32.9)	−2.0 (28.4)
Record low °C (°F)	−5.6 (21.9)	−6.2 (20.8)	−4.2 (24.4)	−0.7 (30.7)	2.8 (37.0)	9.0 (48.2)	14.5 (58.1)	16.2 (61.2)	8.7 (47.7)	2.9 (37.2)	−0.4 (31.3)	−3.3 (26.1)	−6.2 (20.8)
Average precipitation mm (inches)	61.2 (2.41)	74.8 (2.94)	115.6 (4.55)	116.7 (4.59)	149.0 (5.87)	286.0 (11.26)	245.0 (9.65)	177.1 (6.97)	215.9 (8.50)	129.8 (5.11)	86.4 (3.40)	70.2 (2.76)	1,727.5 (68.01)
Average snowfall cm (inches)	3 (1.2)	3 (1.2)	0 (0)	0 (0)	0 (0)	0 (0)	0 (0)	0 (0)	0 (0)	0 (0)	0 (0)	0 (0)	6 (2.4)
Average precipitation days (≥ 1.0 mm)	9.2	8.6	10.9	9.3	8.7	13.3	10.8	8.8	9.9	7.3	7.6	8.9	113.3
Average snowy days (≥ 1 cm)	0.7	0.8	0.1	0	0	0	0	0	0	0	0	0	1.6
Average relative humidity (%)	66	66	67	67	71	78	78	75	76	74	72	69	72
Mean monthly sunshine hours	110.1	132.0	167.7	187.7	197.0	139.0	195.1	219.8	169.5	171.9	135.4	110.0	1,933.4
Source: Japan Meteorological Agency

== Demographics ==
Per Japanese census data, the population of Uwajima has decreased steadily since the 1960s.

Historical population
Year	Pop.	±%
1960	132,146	—
1970	111,648	−15.5%
1980	110,920	−0.7%
1990	105,030	−5.3%
2000	95,641	−8.9%
2010	84,210	−12.0%
2020	70,809	−15.9%

== History ==
The area of Uwajima was part of ancient Iyo Province. During the Heian period, Uwajima (notably the island of Hiburijima in Uwajima Bay) was center of piracy in the Seto Inland Sea and became the stronghold of Fujiwara no Sumitomo in his rebellion. During the Muromachi period, a branch of the Saionji family was appointed as governor of the area by the Ashikaga shogunate, but was constantly being invaded his more powerful and aggressive neighbors, including Ouchi Yoshitaka, Mōri Motonari, Ōtomo Sōrin, the Tosa-Ichijo clan and the Chōsokabe clan. The Saionji survived by the fluid loyalties and fierce resistance, but were eventually overcome by Chōsokabe Motochika, who was in turn overthrown by the forces of Toyotomi Hideyoshi. Iyo Province was given to Kobayakawa Takakage, who assigned the area around Uwajima to his adopted son and half-brother, Hidekane. Takakage was later transferred to Kyushu and was replaced by Hideyoshi's general Toda Katsutaka. In contrast the Kobayakawa, the Toda ruled with extreme harshness, murdering the descendants of the Saiōnji family and thinking nothing of robbery, rape and murder of the local inhabitants. When ordered to send troops to the invasion of Korea in 1592, he cut down large trees in shrines and temples throughout his domain to construct ships. He went insane during the campaign, and died in Korea without heir. Hideyoshi then assigned Tōdō Takatora to the domain. A noted castle designer, Takatora spent six years building Itajima Castle, which would later be called Uwajima Castle. Following the Battle of Sekigahara and other campaigns, he was promoted to Tsu Domain in Ise Province. In 1614, Date Hidemune, the illegitimate eldest son of Date Masamune, was awarded the 100,000 koku Uwajima Domain by Shogun Tokugawa Hidetada, and moved into Uwajima Castle the following year. His descendants would rule the domain until the Meiji restoration.

Following the Meiji restoration, the town of Uwajima was created with the establishment of the modern municipalities system. In 1917, Maruho Village was merged into Uwajima. The town of Uwajima merged with the village of Yahata on August 1, 1921 and was raised to city status. The city was extended by combining Kushima Village in 1934 and renovating the bay area for factory usage. The center of the city was largely destroyed by bombing during World War II in 1945; however, post-war reconstruction was rapid. In 1955, Uwajima annexed Miura and Takamitsu Villages and Uwaumi village in 1974. On August 1, 2005 Uwajima absorbed the towns of Mima, Tsushima and Yoshida (all from Kitauwa District) .

== Government ==
Uwajima has a mayor-council form of government with a directly elected mayor and a unicameral city council of 24 members. Uwajima, together with Kihoku and Matsuno, contributes four members to the Ehime Prefectural Assembly.

In terms of national politics, Uwajima is part of Ehime 3rd district of the lower house of the Diet of Japan. Prior to 2022, the city was part of Ehime 4th district.

== Economy ==
Uwajima is the largest municipality of southwestern Ehime, but industry is poorly developed except for a single shipyard. Commercial fishing, taking advantage of the ria coastline, aquaculture and cultured pearls is the mainstay of the local economy.

== Education ==
Uwajima has 30 public elementary schools and six public middle schools operated by the city government. The city has five public high schools operated by the Ehime Prefectural Board of Education.

== Transportation ==
=== Railways ===
Shikoku Railway Company – Yosan Line

- Tachima – Iyo-Yoshida – Takamitsu – Kita-Uwajima – Uwajima

Shikoku Railway Company – Yodo Line

- Ōuchi – Futana – Iyo-Miyanoshita – Muden – Kita-Uwajima – (Uwajima)

=== Highways ===
- Matsuyama Expressway
- National Route 56
- National Route 320
- National Route 378
- National Route 381

=== Ports ===
- Port of Uwajima

== Local attractions ==
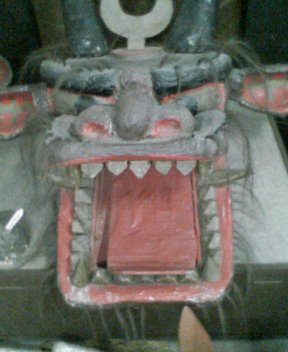
A mask of the Cow Demon (牛鬼, ushioni), one of the many used at the bullfighting festival.

- Uwajima Castle is well known as one of the 12 Japanese castles to have an original donjon built in the Edo Period.
- Date Family Museum which features many historically important objects tied to the history of the region and the Daimyō family Date which ruled this area.
- Taga Shrine, a fertility shrine which features a large, realistic phallus carved from a log approximately 9 feet in length, 1 foot in diameter. Next to the shrine is a graphic sex museum, filled with artifacts and paintings from around the world.
- Uwajima Ushi-oni Festival, also known as "Gaiya Festival," or the "Warei Shrine Festival." Held in July, among the festivities are ushioni teams parading down the street, a dance contest to the town song known as the "Gaiya" dance, traditional dancing, and a bullfight. The word "Gaiya" is in a local dialect, approximately translating to "awesome" in English.The city is known for bullfighting, which differs from the more widely known Spanish bullfights in that there is no matador. Two bulls fight in a ring until one bull's knees touch the ground or flees, marking it the loser. Bullfights are generally held in January, April, July, and August.
- Ryūkō-ji, 41st temple on the Shikoku Pilgrimage
- Butsumoku-ji, 42nd temple on the Shikoku Pilgrimage

=== Tsushima ===
Tsushima occupies an area of approximately 200 km^{2} and has a significant proportion of Uwajima's current land area, despite not being highly populated (fewer than 15,000 people). It's made up of small villages that shared a municipal government as Tsushima until they were amalgamated into Uwajima.

Tsushima is known for the Iwamatsu River and its annual festival where people eat tiny, live fish, as well as pearl and fish farming. It is part of the prefecture's mikan industry.

== Notable people from Uwajima, Ehime ==
- Umetaro Azechi, Japanese printmaker and mountain climber
- Masafumi Hirai, Japanese professional baseball pitcher
- Tadashi Irie, yakuza, the head (kumicho) of the Osaka-based 2nd Takumi-gumi and the grand general manager (so-honbucho) of the 6th Yamaguchi-gumi
- Kazuyoshi Ishii, Japanese master of Seidokaikan karate and founder of the K-1 fighting circuit
- Daisuke Itō, Japanese film director and screenwriter
- Akinori Iwamura, Japanese baseball manager and former baseball infielder
- Kyoichi Katayama, the author of the novel Socrates in Love, is from Uwajima. The novel was turned into a movie.
- Kenta Kawai, Japanese former football player
- Susumu Koshimizu, Japanese sculptor, installation artist and member of Mono-ha
- Shingo Matsumoto, Japanese amateur Greco-Roman wrestler
- Ryuji Miyade, former Nippon Professional Baseball outfielder
- Shinro Ohtake, a contemporary Japanese artist, has lived and worked in Uwajima since 1987.
- Masayoshi Ōishi, Japanese musician and singer-songwriter
- Tetchō Suehiro, Japanese politician, novelist, and journalist
- Mutsumi Tamabayashi, Japanese football player (Ehime FC, J2 League)
- Sho Tanaka, Japanese professional wrestler
- Raymond Ken'ichi Tanaka, Bishop of the Roman Catholic Diocese of Kyoto (1976–1997)
- Koichi Yamamoto, Japanese politician, member of Liberal Democratic Party and member of the House of Representatives in the Diet (national legislature)
- Haruhiro Yamashita, Japanese gymnast and 2x Olympic gold medalist (1964 Summer Olympics)

== Gallery ==
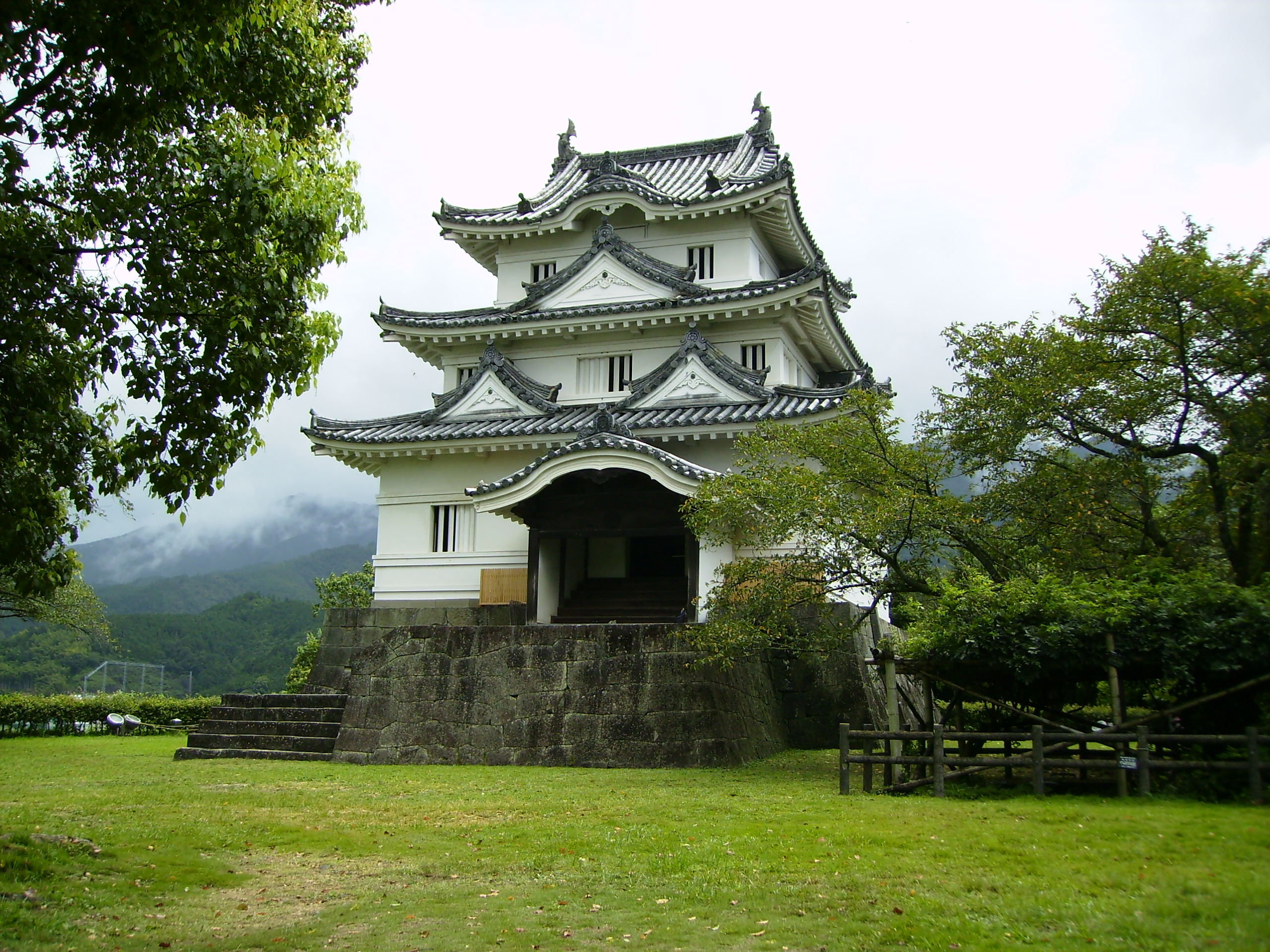
Uwajima Castle

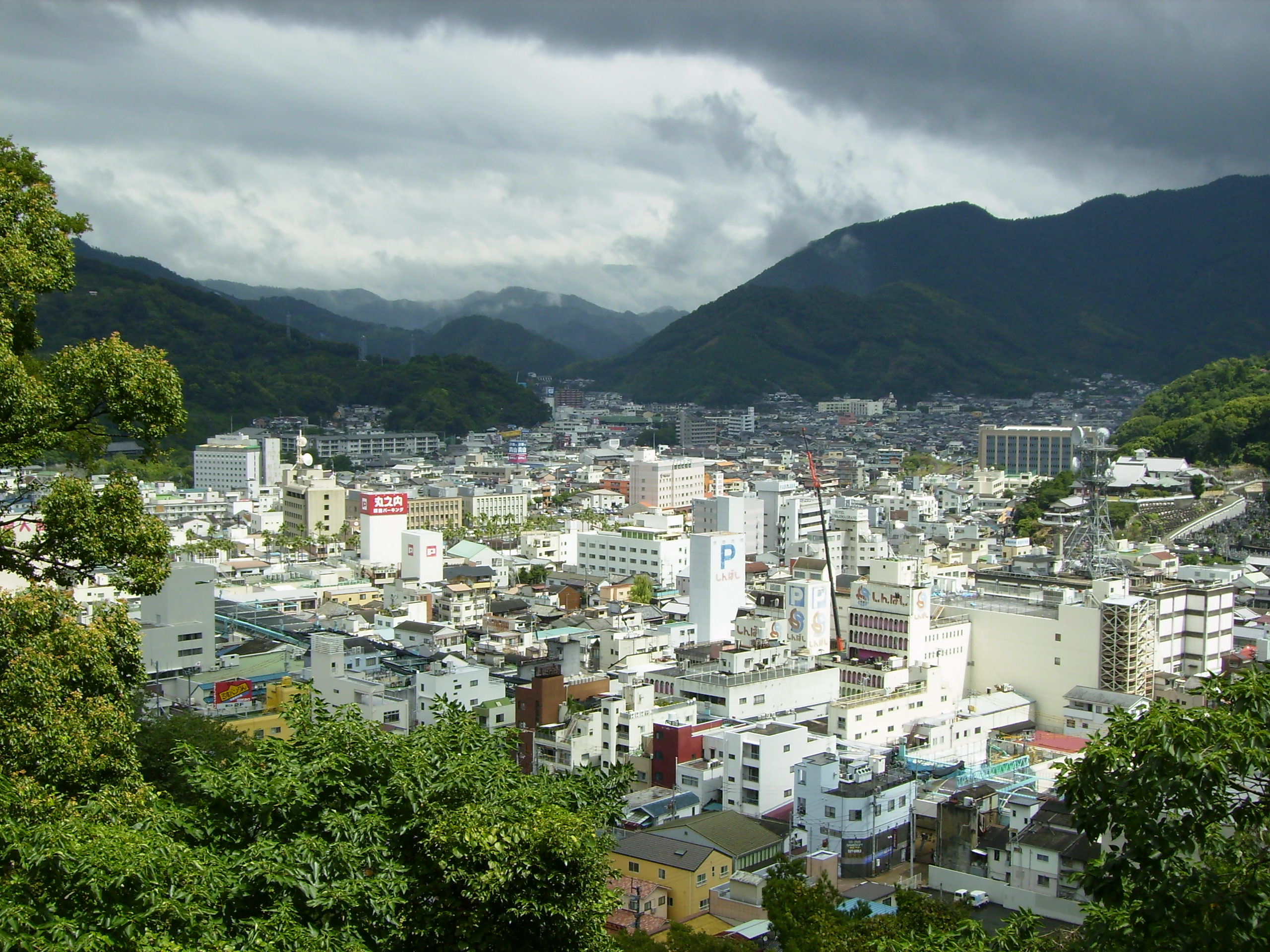
Uwajima as viewed from the castle

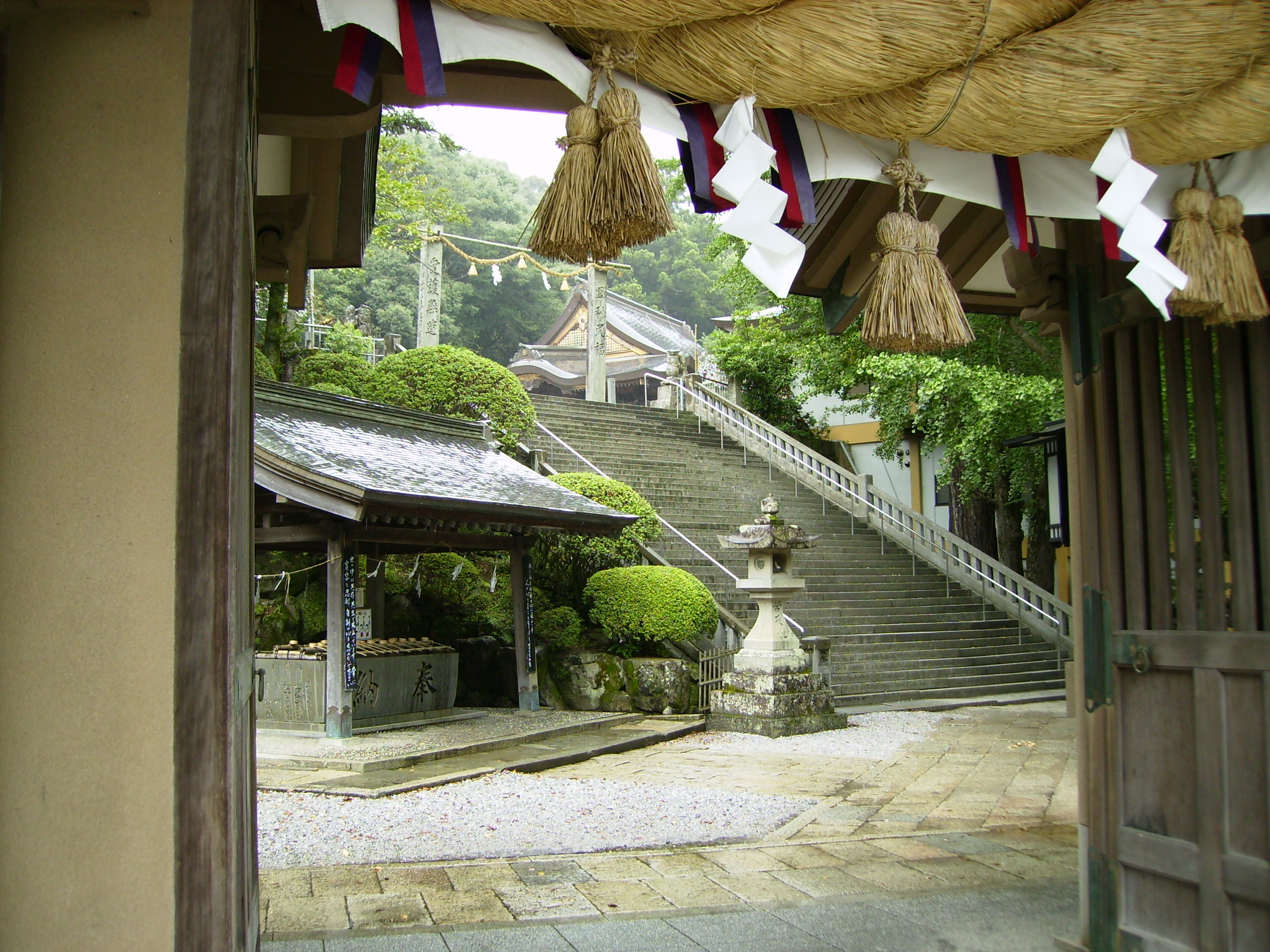
Warei Shrine

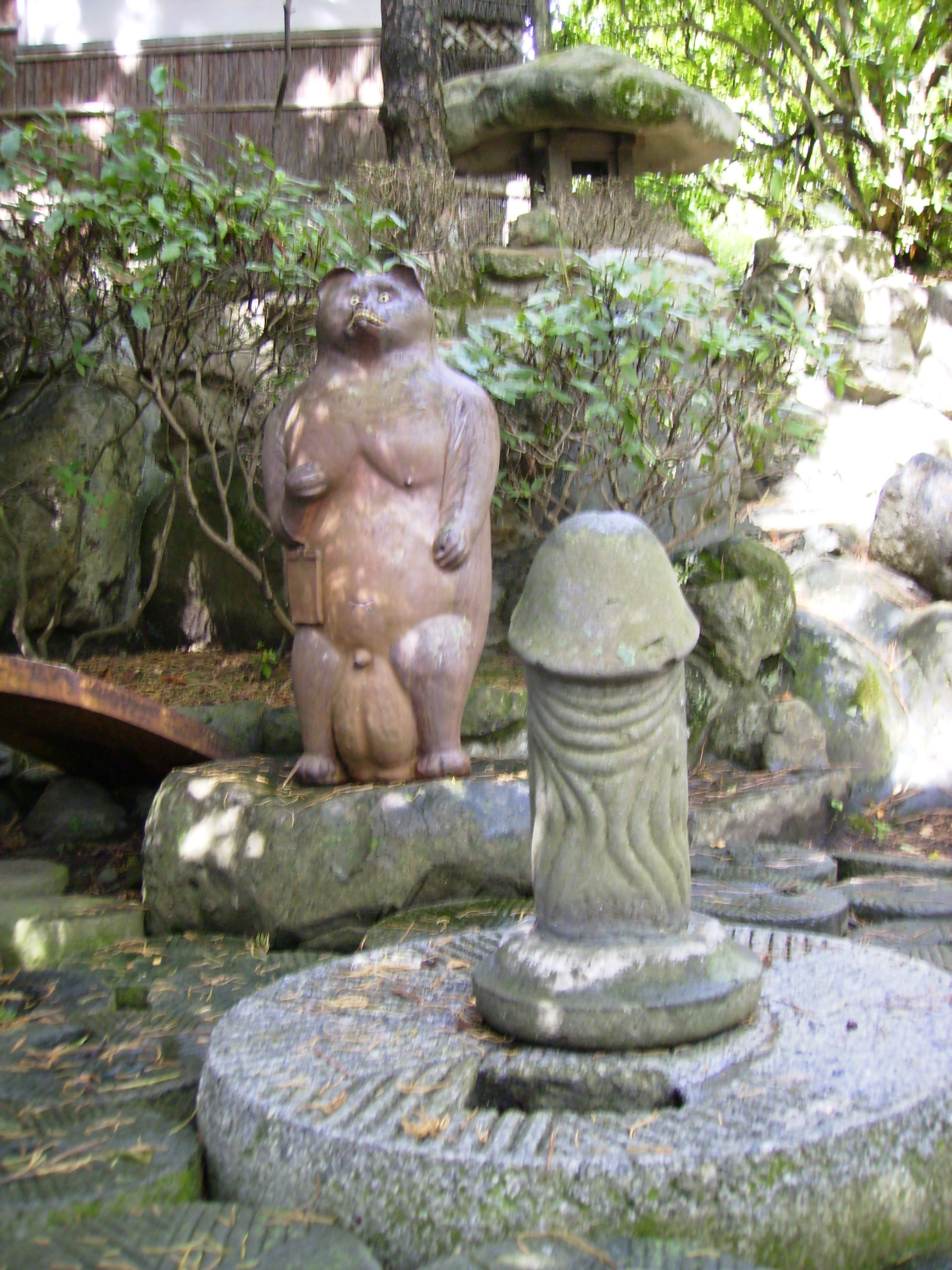
Taga Shrine statues
