= Unomachi Station =

Railway station in Seiyo, Ehime Prefecture, Japan

U22 Unomachi Station 卯之町駅
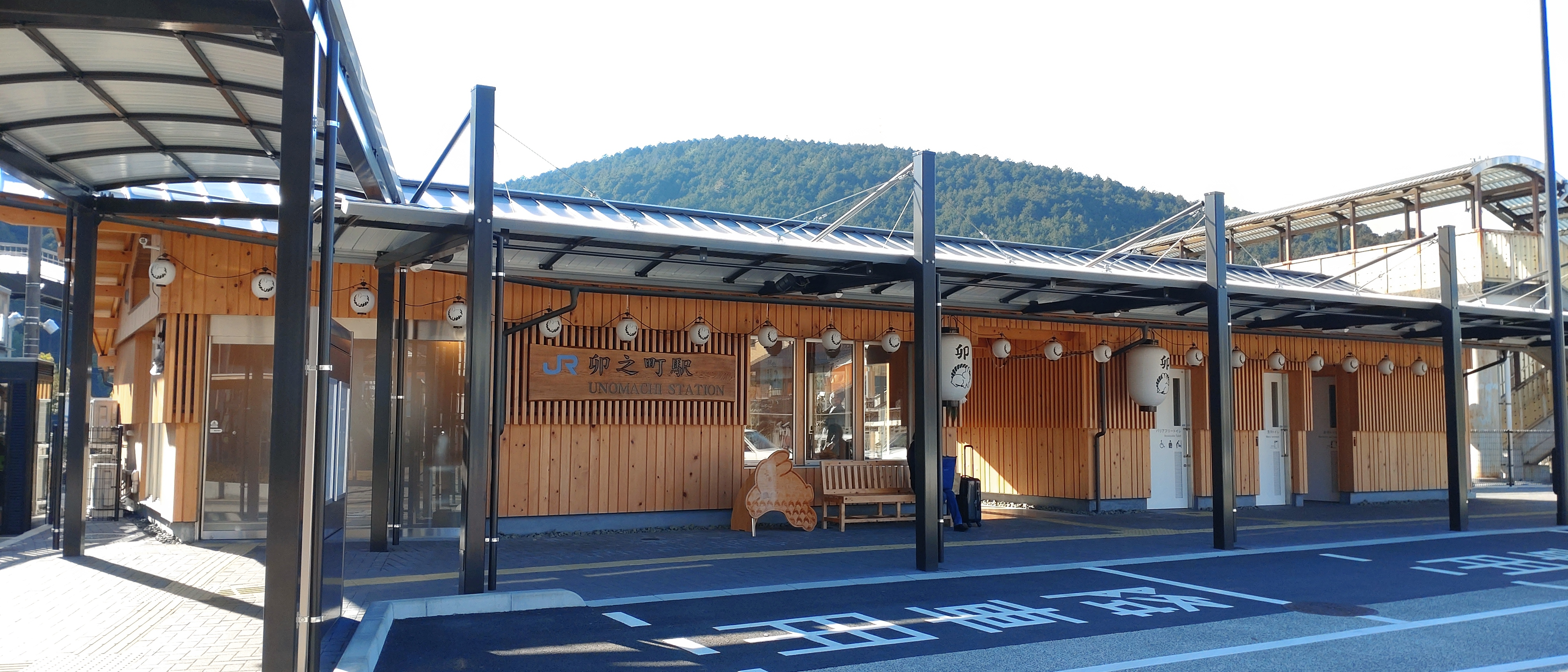
- Unomachi Station in 2024

General information
- Location: 2 Chome Uwachō Unomachi, Seiyo City, Ehime Prefecture 797-0015; Japan
- Coordinates: 33°21′48″N 132°30′36″E
- Operator: JR Shikoku
- Line: Yosan Line
- Distance: 271.1 km (168.5 mi) from Takamatsu
- Platforms: 1 side + 1 island platforms
- Tracks: 3 + 1 siding

Construction
- Structure type: At grade
- Parking: Available
- Accessible: No - footbridge needed to access island platform

Other information
- Status: Staffed - JR ticket window (Midori no Madoguchi)
- Station code: U22
- Website: Official website

History
- Opened: 2 July 1941; 85 years ago

Passengers
- FY2019: 560

Services
Preceding station	JR Shikoku	Following station
Shimo-Uwa U23 towards Uwajima	Yosan Line	Kami-Uwa U21 towards Takamatsu
Location
- Location within Ehime Prefecture Location within Japan

Unomachi Station (卯之町駅, Unomachi-eki) is a passenger railway station located in the city of Seiyo, Ehime Prefecture, Japan. It is operated by JR Shikoku and has the station number "U22".

== Lines ==
The station is served by the JR Shikoku Yosan Line and is located 256.5 km from the beginning of the line at Takamatsu. Eastbound local trains which serve the station terminate at Matsuyama. Connections with other services are needed to travel further east of Matsuyama on the line.

In addition, the Uwakai limited express also stops at the station.

== Layout ==
The station consists of an island platform and a side platform serving three tracks. Access to the island platform is by means of a footbridge. A timber station building of traditional Japanese design houses a waiting room, a shops and a JR ticket window (with a Midori no Madoguchi facility). Car parking is available outside the station. A siding branches off line 1 and ends near the station building.

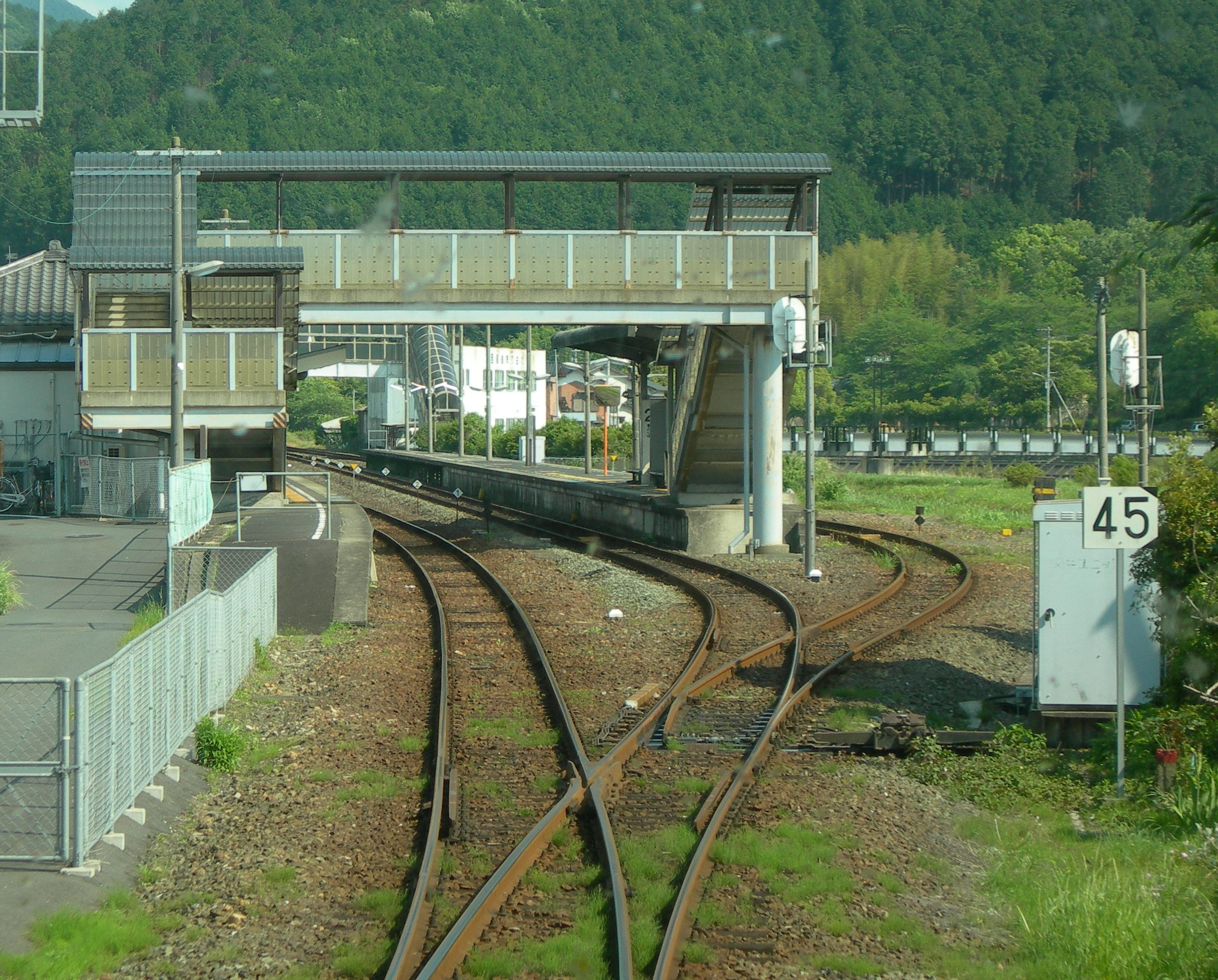
A view of Unomachi Station's platforms and tracks.

== Adjacent stations ==
«	Service	»
JR Limited Express Services
Yawatahama	Uwakai	Iyo-Yoshida

== History ==
The station was opened on 2 July 1941 as the eastern terminus of the then Uwajima Line with Uwajima at the western end. Subsequently, the track of the Yosan Mainline was extended westwards from Yawatahama and linked up with the Uwajima Line at Unomachi, absorbing the latter line and its stations. Unomachi then became part of the Yosan Main Line on 20 June 1945. At that time, the station was operated by Japanese Government Railways (JGR), later becoming Japanese National Railways (JNR). With the privatization of JNR on 1 April 1987, control of the station passed to JR Shikoku.

== Surrounding area ==
- Museum of Ehime History and Culture
- Kaimei School

== See also ==
- List of railway stations in Japan
