= Yawatahama Station =

Railway station in Yawatahama, Ehime Prefecture, Japan

U18 Yawatahama Station 八幡浜駅
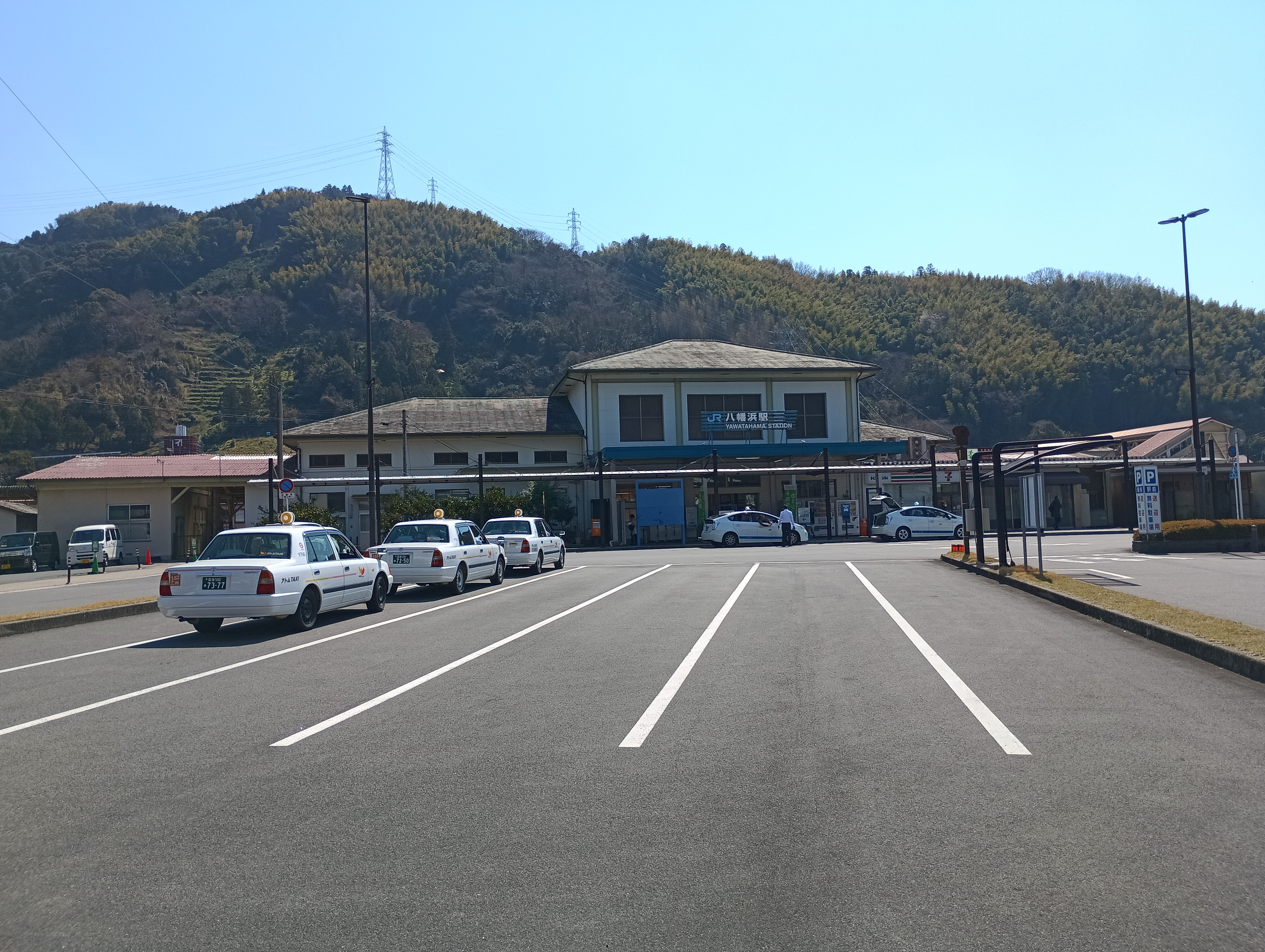
- Yawatahama Station in 2026

General information
- Location: 1-11-5 Edooka, Yawatahama City, Ehime Prefecture 796-0031; Japan
- Coordinates: 33°27′31″N 132°26′09″E
- Operator: JR Shikoku
- Line: Yosan Line
- Distance: 262.8 km (163.3 mi) from Takamatsu
- Platforms: 1 side + 1 island platforms
- Tracks: 3 + several passing loops and sidings

Construction
- Structure type: At grade
- Parking: Available
- Accessible: No - footbridge needed to access island platform

Other information
- Status: Staffed (Midori no Madoguchi)
- Station code: U18
- Website: Official website

History
- Opened: 6 February 1939; 87 years ago

Passengers
- FY2019: 2038

Services
Preceding station	JR Shikoku	Following station
Futaiwa U19 towards Uwajima	Yosan Line	Senjō U17 towards Takamatsu
Location
- Location within Ehime Prefecture Location within Japan

Yawatahama Station (八幡浜駅, Yawatahama-eki) is a passenger railway station located in the city of Yawatahama, Ehime Prefecture, Japan. It is operated by JR Shikoku and has the station number "U18".

== Lines ==
Yawatahama Station is served by the JR Shikoku Yosan Line and is located 262.8 km from the beginning of the line at Takamatsu. Eastbound local trains which serve the station terminate at Matsuyama. Connections with other services are needed to travel further east of Matsuyama on the line.

The Uwakai limited express train, which runs between Matsuyama and Uwajima, stops at this station.

== Layout ==
The station consists of an island platform and a side platform serving three tracks. Access to the island platform is by means of a footbridge. The station building houses a waiting room, shops, a JR ticket window (Midori no Madoguchi facility) and a JR Travel Centre (Warp Plaza). Car parking and car rental is available at the station. There is a passing loop between tracks 2 and 3, in between the side and island platform and several sidings are located south of the station beyond track 3.

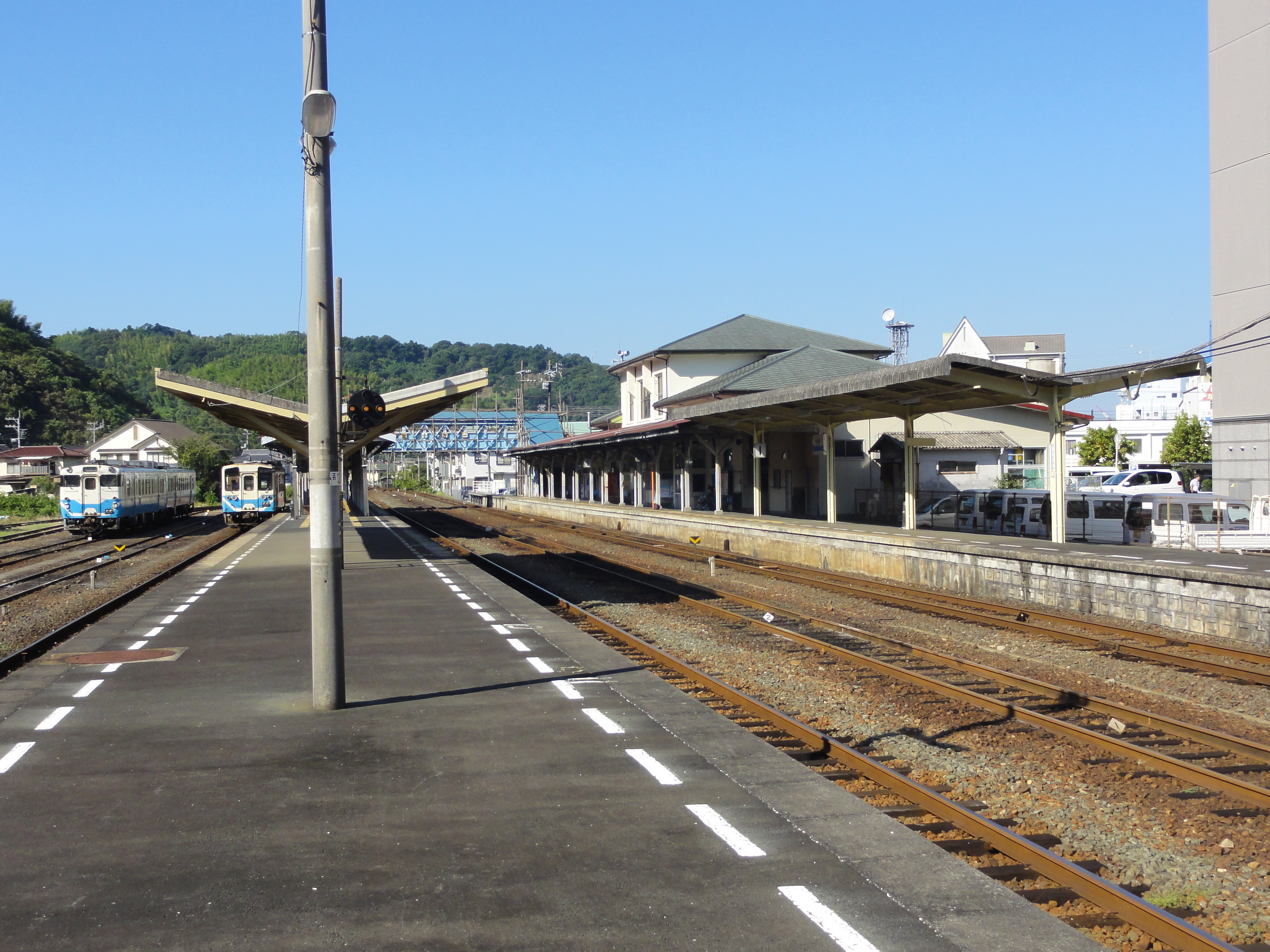
A view of the station platforms and tracks. A passing loop can be seen on the right, between the two platforms. Sidings can be seen branching to the left beyond the island platform.

== Adjacent stations ==
«	Service	»
JR Limited Express Services
Iyo-Ōzu	Uwakai	Unomachi

== History ==
Yawatahama Station was opened on 6 February 1939 as the western terminus of the then Yosan Mainline which had been extended westwards from Iyo-Hirano. It became a through-station on 20 June 1945 when the track of the Yosan Mainline linked up with the track of the then Uwajima Line at Unomachi, allowing through-traffic from Takamatsu to Uwajima. At that time, the station was operated by Japanese Government Railways (JGR), later becoming Japanese National Railways (JNR). With the privatization of JNR on 1 April 1987, control of the station passed to JR Shikoku.

== Surrounding area ==
- Yawatahama Port Ferry Terminal
- Yawatahama Labor Standards Inspection Office
- Yawatahama Tax Office
- Yawatahama City Public Health and Welfare Center

== See also ==
- List of railway stations in Japan
