= Takamatsu Station (Kagawa) =

Railway station in Takamatsu, Kagawa Prefecture, Japan

Y00 T28 Takamatsu Station 高松駅
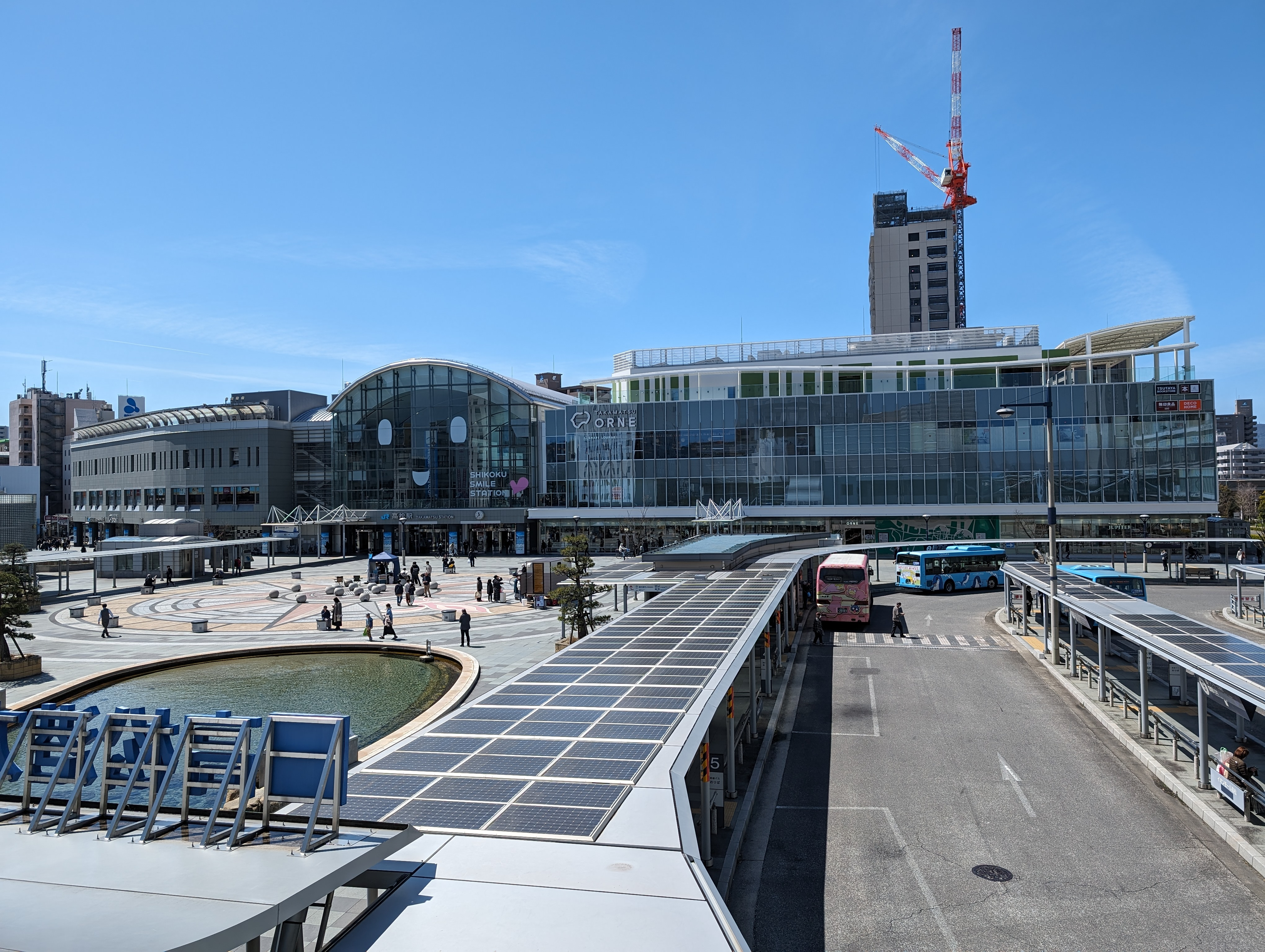
- Takamatsu Station in March 2024

General information
- Location: 1-20 Hamano-chō, Takamatsu City, Kagawa Prefecture; Japan
- Coordinates: 34°21′03″N 134°02′47″E
- Operator: JR Shikoku
- Lines: Yosan Line; Kōtoku Line
- Platforms: 4 bay platforms
- Tracks: 9
- Connections: Bus terminal

Other information
- Status: Staffed (Midori no Madoguchi)
- Station code: Y00 (Yosan Line); T28 (Kotoku Line)

History
- Opened: 21 February 1897; 129 years ago

Passengers
- FY2019: 9,285

Services
Preceding station	JR Shikoku	Following station
Kōzai Y01 towards Uwajima	Yosan Line	Terminus
Terminus	Kōtoku Line	Shōwachō T27 towards Tokushima
Location
- Location within Kagawa Prefecture Location within Japan

Takamatsu Station (高松駅, Takamatsu-eki) is a junction passenger railway station located in the city of Takamatsu, Kagawa Prefecture, Japan. It is operated by JR Shikoku and has the station number "Y00" and "T28" .

== Lines ==
The station is terminus of the JR Shikoku Yosan Line and is located 297.6 km from the opposing terminus of the line at Uwajima. It is also the terminus of the JR Shikoku Kōtoku Line and is 74.5 kilometers from the terminus of that line at Tokushima.

== Layout ==
Takamatsu Station is an above-ground station with four bay platforms serving nine tracks. As the platforms all dead head, the station building is located at the end, allowing barrier-free access. The station has a Midori no Madoguchi staffed ticket office.

== Ground-level platforms ==
1・2	Kōtoku Line	Ritsurin, Shido, Sambommatsu, Tokushima
3	Limited Express Uzushio	Ritsurin, Shido, Sanbommatsu, Tokushima
3	Kōtoku Line	Ritsurin, Shido, Sanbommatsu, Tokushima
4	Yosan Line Dosan Line (direct)	Sakaide, Utazu, Tadotsu, Kan'onji, Kotohira
5	Limited Express Uzushio	Utazu・Kojima, Okayama
5	Rapid Marine Liner	Sakaide, Kojima, Chayamachi, Okayama
5	Yosan Line Dosan Line (Local)	Sakaide, Tadotsu, Kotohira
6	Limited Express Shimanto	Kotohira, Awa-Ikeda・Kōchi
6	Rapid Marine Liner	Sakaide, Kojima, Chayamachi Station, Okayama
6	Yosan Line Dosan Line (direct)	Sakaide, Tadotsu, Kanonji, Kotohira
7	Limited Express Ishizuchi	Kan'onji, Iyo-Saijō, Matsuyama, Uwajima
7	Yosan Line Dosan Line (direct)	Sakaide, Tadotsu, Kanonji, Kotohira
8	Limited Express Shimanto	Kotohira, Awa-ikeda, Kochi, Nakamura
8	Yosan Line Dosan Line (direct)	Sakaide, Tadotsu, Kanonji, Kotohira
8	Rapid Marine Liner	Sakaide, Kojima, Chayamachi Station, Okayama
9	Yosan Line Dosan Line (direct)	Sakaide, Tadotsu, Kanonji, Kotohira
9	Overnight Limited Express Sleeper Sunrise Seto	Okayama, Osaka, Tokyo

== History ==
Takamatsu Station opened on 21 February 1897. With the privatization and dissolution of Japan National Railways on 1 April 1987, the station came under the control of the newly created Japan Railways Shikoku (JR Shikoku).

== Surrounding area ==
- Takamatsu-Chikkō Station
- National Route 30
- Takamatsu Castle

== See also ==
- List of railway stations in Japan
