= Uwajima Station =

Railway station in Uwajima, Ehime Prefecture, Japan

U28 G47 Uwajima Station 宇和島駅
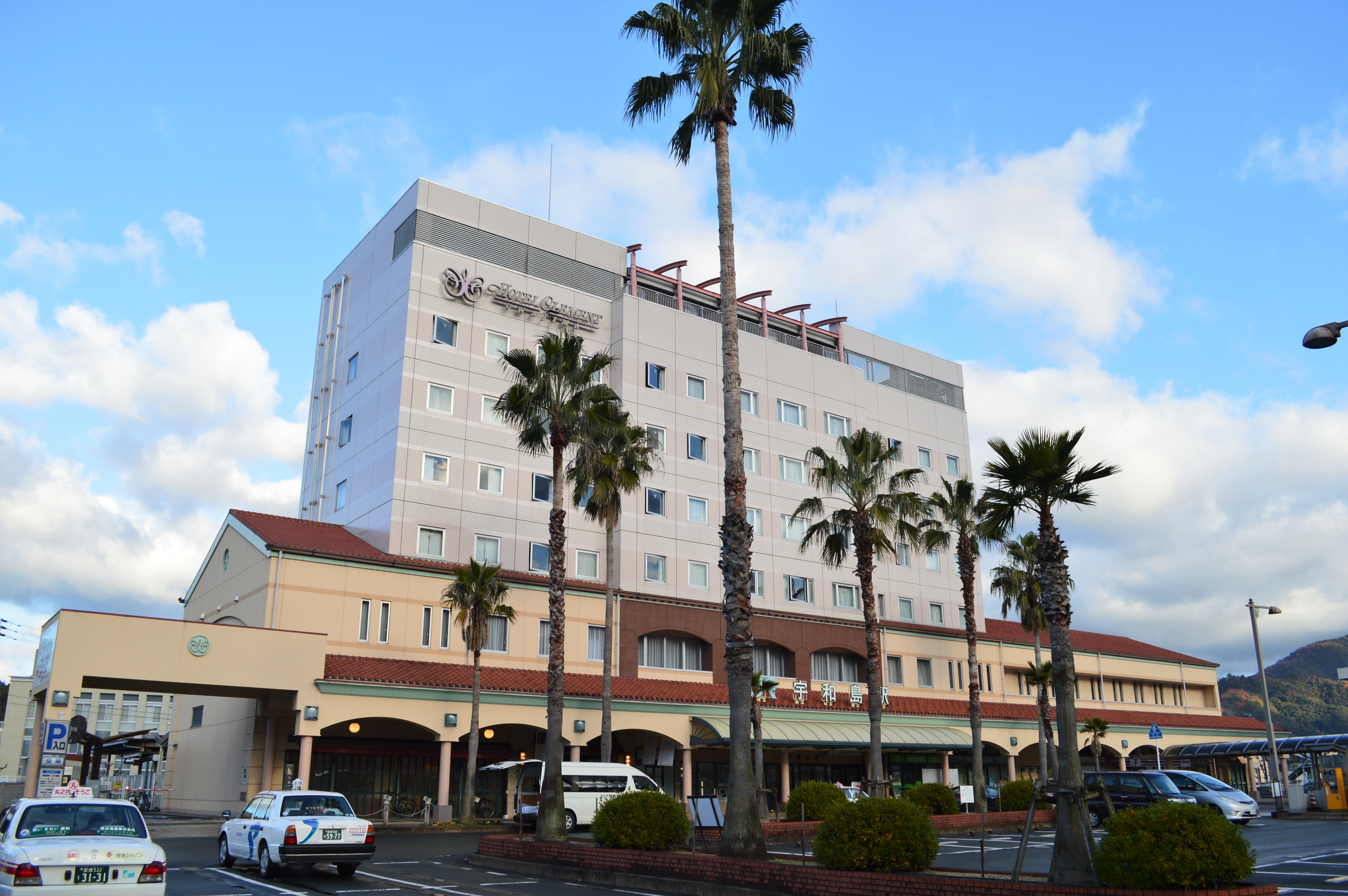
- Uwajima Station in December 2020

General information
- Location: 10 Nishikimachi, Uwajima City, Ehime Prefecture 798-0034; Japan
- Coordinates: 33°13′32.8″N 132°34′2.9″E
- Operator: JR Shikoku
- Lines: Yodo Line; Yosan Line
- Distance: 77.8 km (48.3 mi) from Wakai; 297.6 km (184.9 mi) from Takamatsu
- Platforms: 2 bay platforms
- Tracks: 3

Construction
- Structure type: At grade

Other information
- Status: Staffed
- Station code: G47; U28

History
- Opened: 18 October 1914; 112 years ago

Passengers
- FY2018: 1,280

Services
Preceding station	JR Shikoku	Following station
Terminus	Yosan Line	Kita-Uwajima Y27 G46 towards Takamatsu
Terminus	Yodo Line	Kita-Uwajima Y27 G46 towards Kubokawa
Location
- Location within Ehime Prefecture Location within Japan

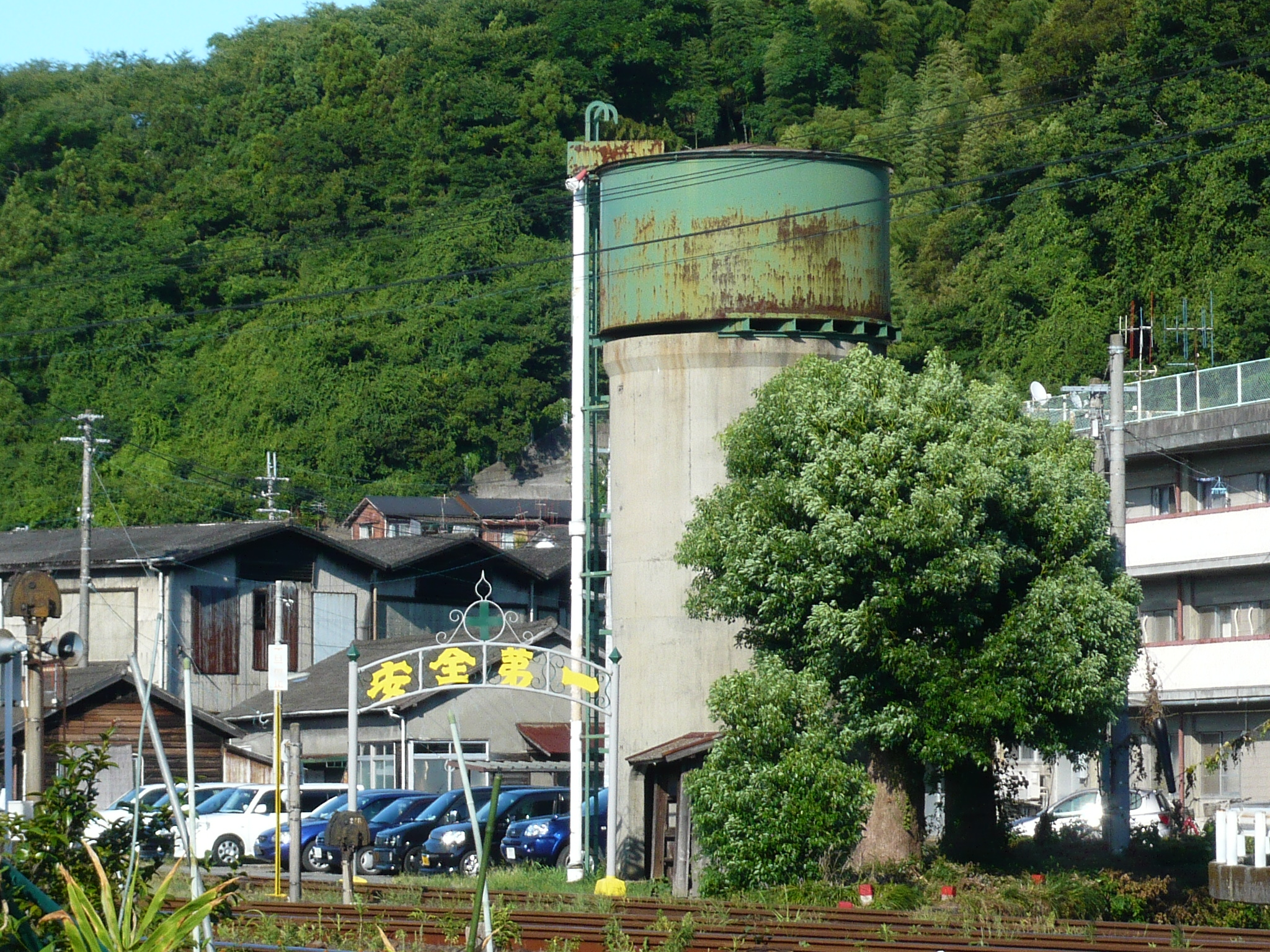
Uwajima Station water tower

Uwajima Station (宇和島駅, Uwajima-eki) is a passenger railway station located in the city of Uwajima, Ehime Prefecture, Japan. It is operated by JR Shikoku. Also known as Ueno Wajima station.

== Lines ==
The station is the terminus of the JR Shikoku's Yodo Line for which it is station number "G47" and is located 77.8 km from the opposing terminus of the line at Wakai. It is also the terminus of JR Shikoku's Yosan Line for which it is station number "U28" and is located 297.6 km from the opposing terminus of that line at Takamatsu.

The Uwakai limited express train starts and terminates at this station. Its other terminus is at Matsuyama.

== Layout ==
The station, which is staffed, consists of two ground-level bay platforms serving three tracks.

== History ==
The station opened on 18 October 1914 as a through-station on the narrow-gauge line from Uwajima to Chikanaga owned by the Uwajima Railway (宇和島鉄道). With the nationalization of Uwajima Railway on 1 August 1933, the station came under the control of Japanese Government Railways (JGR), later becoming Japanese National Railways (JNR).

With the privatization of JNR on 1 April 1987, control passed to JR Shikoku.

== Surrounding area ==
- Uwajima Castle
- Uwajima City Date Museum
- Uwajima City Hall

== See also ==
- List of railway stations in Japan
