= Hataki Station =

Railway station in Ōzu, Ehime Prefecture, Japan

S15 Hataki Station 八多喜駅
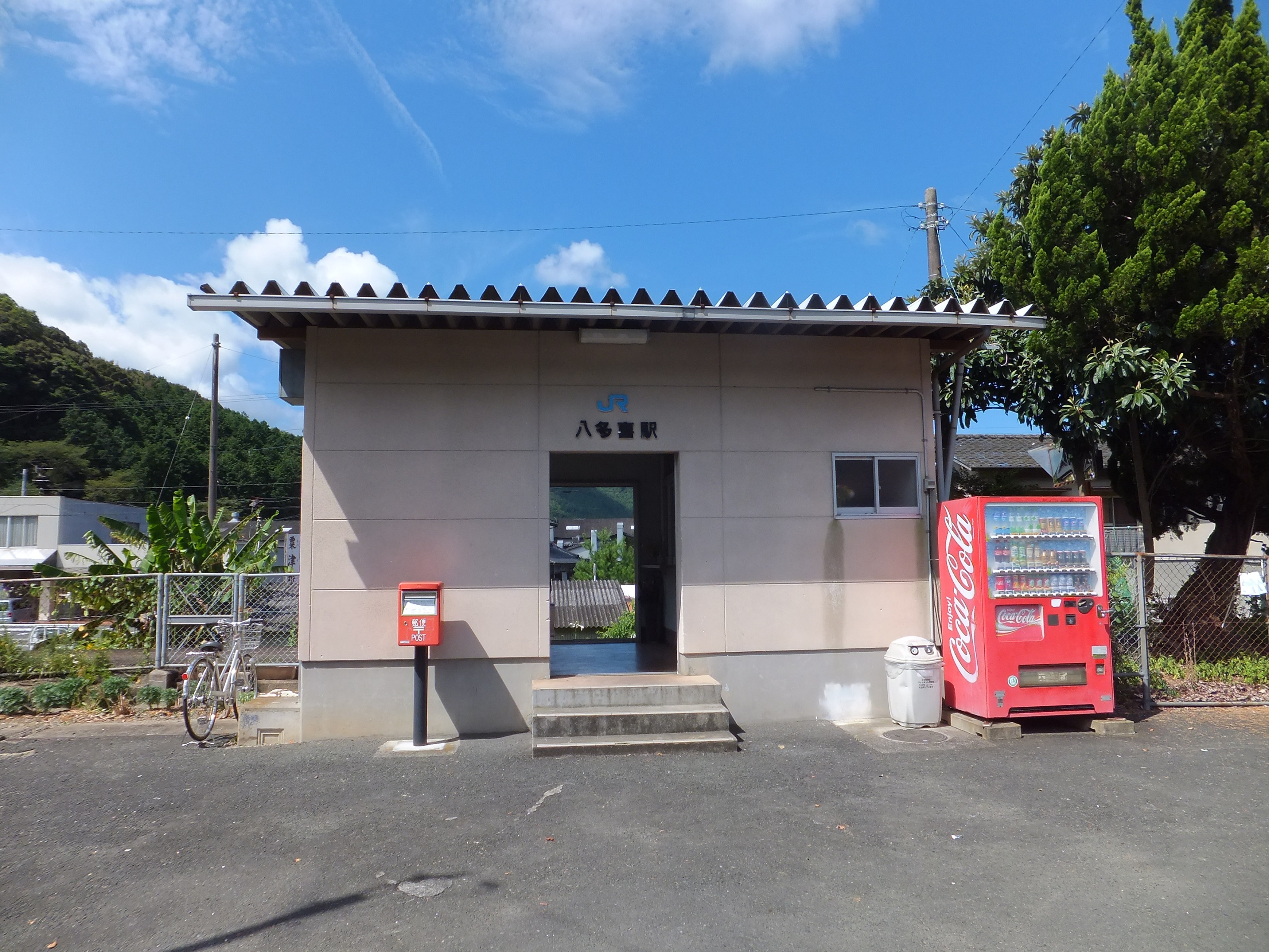
- Hataki Station in August 2020

General information
- Location: Hataki-chō, Ōzu City, Ehime Prefecture 795-0041; Japan
- Coordinates: 33°33′46″N 132°32′26″E
- Operator: JR Shikoku
- Line: Yosan Line
- Distance: 241.7 km (150.2 mi) from Takamatsu
- Platforms: 1 side platform
- Tracks: 1

Construction
- Structure type: At grade
- Accessible: No - steps at entrance to station building

Other information
- Status: Unstaffed
- Station code: S15

History
- Opened: 14 February 1918; 108 years ago

Passengers
- FY2019: 64

Services
Preceding station	JR Shikoku	Following station
Haruka S16 towards Uwajima	Yosan Line via Iyo-Nagahama	Iyo-Shirataki S14 towards Takamatsu
Location
- Location within Ehime Prefecture Location within Japan

Hataki Station (八多喜駅, Hataki-eki) is a passenger railway station located in the city of Ōzu, Ehime Prefecture, Japan. It is operated by JR Shikoku and has the station number "S15".

== Lines ==
Hataki Station is located on the older, original, branch of the Yosan Line which runs along the coast from Mukaibara to Iyo-Ōzu and is 241.7 km from the beginning of the line at Takamatsu. Only local trains stop at the station. Eastbound local services end at Matsuyama. Connections with other services are needed to travel further east of Matsuyama on the line.

== Layout ==
The station consists of a side platform serving a single track. The station building is unstaffed and serves only as a waiting room.

== History ==
The station opened on 14 February 1918. At that time, it was an intermediate station on the privately run 762 mm gauge Ehime Railway from Nagahama-machi (now Iyo-Nagahama) to Ōzu (now Iyo-Ōzu). When the company was nationalized on 1 October 1933, Japanese Government Railways (JGR) assumed control and operated the station as part of the Ehime Line. Subsequently, the track of the Ehime Line was regauged to 1,067 mm. A link up with the Yosan Line was created between Kitanada and Iyo-Nagahama. The stretch of Ehime Line track from Iyo-Nagahama to Iyo-Ōzu, including Hataki was then incorporated into the Yosan Main Line on 6 October 1935. In the process, Hataki was also moved to its present location. With the privatization of JNR on 1 April 1987, the station came under the control of JR Shikoku.

== Surrounding area ==
- Ozu Municipal Awazu Elementary School
- Ozu Municipal Ozu Higashi Junior High School

== See also ==
- List of railway stations in Japan
