= Gorō Station =

Railway station in Ōzu, Ehime Prefecture, Japan

S17 Gorō Station 五郎駅
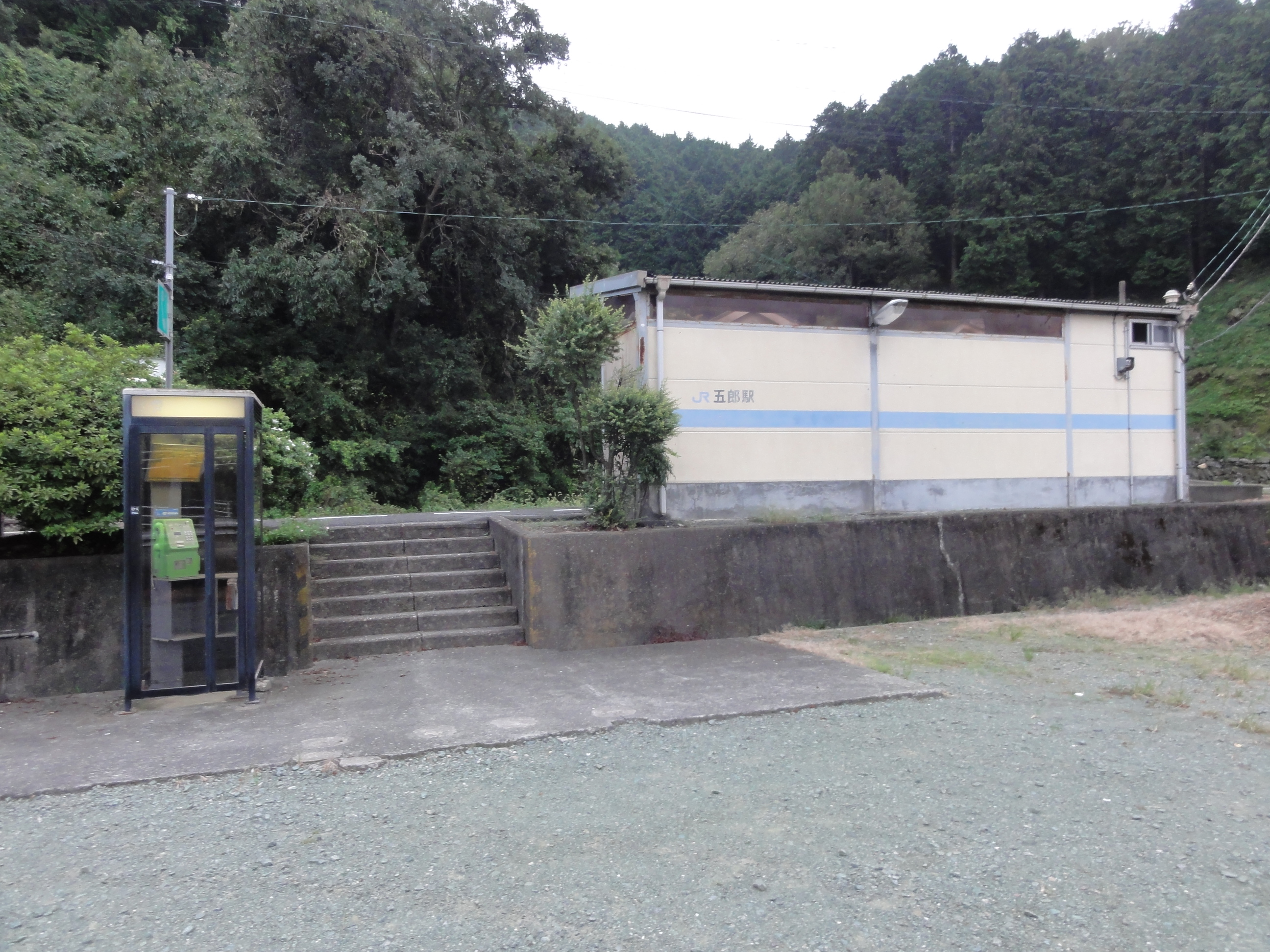
- Gorō Station in 2011

General information
- Location: Gorō, Ōzu City, Ehime Prefecture 795-0051; Japan
- Coordinates: 33°32′28″N 132°34′13″E
- Operator: JR Shikoku
- Line: Yosan Line
- Distance: 245.7 km (152.7 mi) from Takamatsu
- Platforms: 1 side platform
- Tracks: 1

Construction
- Structure type: At grade
- Accessible: No - steps lead up to platform

Other information
- Status: Unstaffed
- Station code: S17

History
- Opened: 14 February 1918; 108 years ago

Passengers
- FY2019: 40

Services
Preceding station	JR Shikoku	Following station
Iyo-Ōzu U14 S18 towards Uwajima	Yosan Line via Iyo-Nagahama	Haruka S16 towards Takamatsu
Location
- Location within Ehime Prefecture Location within Japan

Gorō Station (五郎駅, Gorō-eki) is a passenger railway station located in the city of Ōzu, Ehime Prefecture, Japan. It is operated by JR Shikoku and has the station number "S17".

== Lines ==
Gorō Station is located on the older, original, branch of the Yosan Line which runs along the coast from Mukaibara to Iyo-Ōzu and is 245.7 km from the beginning of the line at Takamatsu. Only local trains stop at the station. Eastbound local services end at Matsuyama. Connections with other services are needed to travel further east of Matsuyama on the line.

== Layout ==
The station, which is unstaffed, consists of a side platform serving a single track. There is no station building, only a shelter on the platform for waiting passengers. Also present are the remnants of a disused island platform.

== History ==
The station opened on 14 February 1918. At that time, it was an intermediate station on the privately run 762 mm gauge Ehime Railway from Nagahama-machi (now Iyo-Nagahama) to Ōzu (now Iyo-Ōzu). When the company was nationalized on 1 October 1933, Japanese Government Railways (JGR) assumed control and operated the station as part of the Ehime Line. Subsequently, the track of the Ehime Line was regauged to 1,067 mm. A link with the Yosan Line was created between Kitanada and Iyo-Nagahama. The stretch of Ehime Line track from Iyo-Nagahama to Iyo-Ōzu, including Gorō, was then incorporated into the Yosan Main Line on 6 October 1935. At the same time, the branch of Ehime Line from Gorō through Niiya to Kitayama and later Uchiko became the Uchiko Line .Gorō became the official start point of this line.

On 3 March 1986, the Uchiko shortcut/branch of the Yosan Line from Mukaibara through Uchiko to Niiya and Iyo-Ōzu was completed. The branch from Gorō to Niiya was then abolished and Gorō ceased to be part of the Uchiko Line.

With the privatization of JNR on 1 April 1987, the station came under the control of JR Shikoku.

== Surrounding area ==
- Hijikawa Disaster Prevention Station

== See also ==
- List of railway stations in Japan
