= Iyo-Shirataki Station =

Railway station in Ōzu, Ehime Prefecture, Japan

S14 Iyo-Shirataki Station 伊予白滝駅
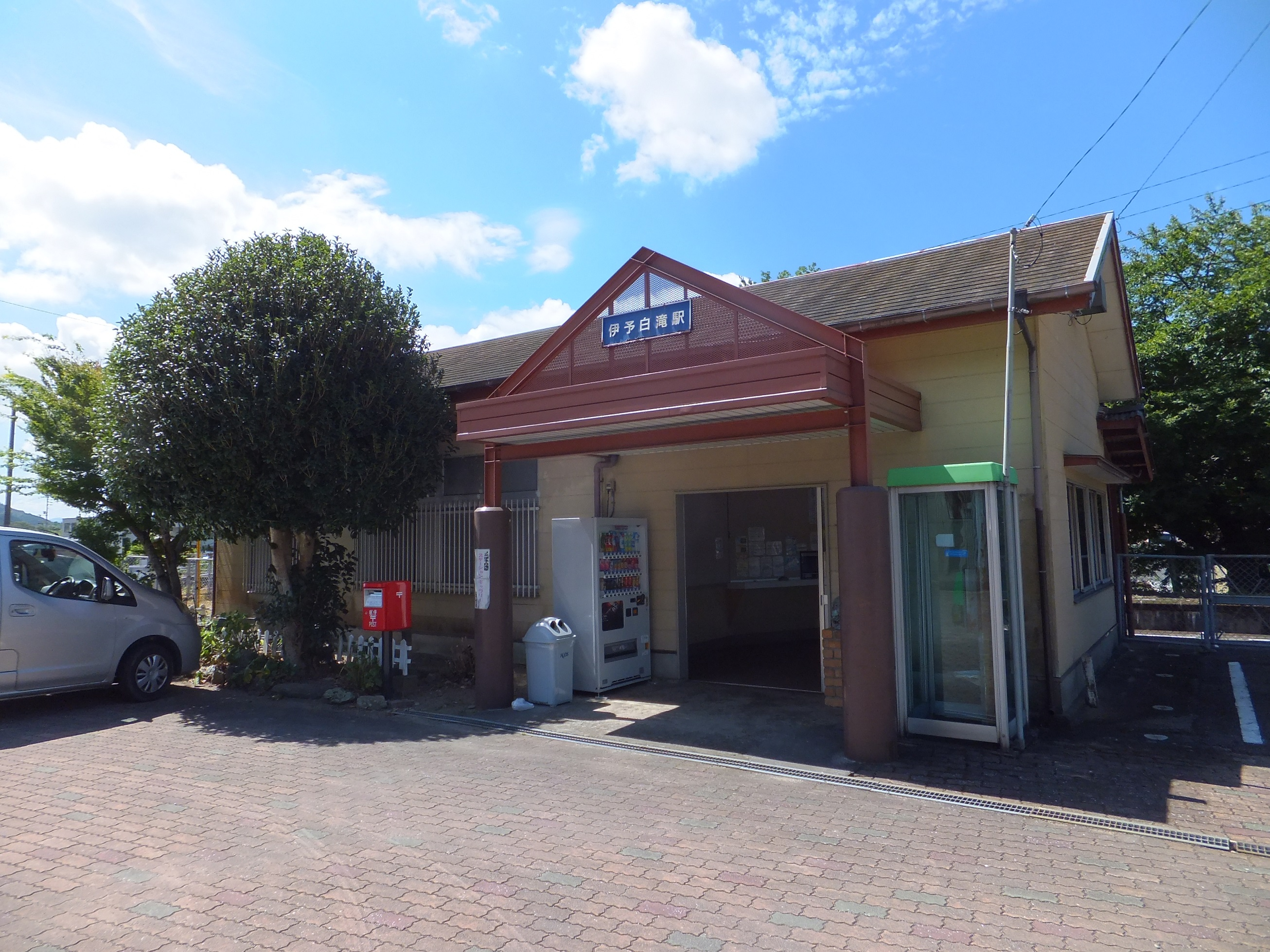
- Iyo-Shirataki Station in August 2020

General information
- Location: Shirataki, Ōzu City, Ehime Prefecture 799-3431; Japan
- Coordinates: station 33°34′43″N 132°31′36″E
- Operator: JR Shikoku
- Line: Yosan Line
- Distance: 239.3 km (148.7 mi) from Takamatsu
- Platforms: 2 side platforms
- Tracks: 2

Construction
- Structure type: At grade

Other information
- Status: Unstaffed
- Station code: S14

History
- Opened: 14 February 1918; 108 years ago
- Former names: Kaya (until 1 October 1933)

Passengers
- FY2019: 40

Services
Preceding station	JR Shikoku	Following station
Hataki S15 towards Uwajima	Yosan Line via Iyo-Nagahama	Iyo-Izushi S13 towards Takamatsu
Location
- Location within Ehime Prefecture Location within Japan

Iyo-Shirataki Station (伊予白滝駅, Iyo-Shirataki Eki) is a passenger railway station located in the city of Ōzu, Ehime Prefecture, Japan. It is operated by JR Shikoku and has the station number "S14".

== Lines ==
Iyo-Shirataki Station is located on the older, original, branch of the Yosan Line which runs along the coast from Mukaibara to Iyo-Ōzu and is 239.3 km from the beginning of the line at Takamatsu. Only local trains stop at the station. Eastbound local services end at Matsuyama. Connections with other services are needed to travel further east of Matsuyama on the line.

== Layout ==
The station, which is unstaffed, consists of two opposed side platforms serving two tracks. The station building is unstaffed and serves only as a waiting room. Access to the opposite platform is by means of a level crossing.

== History ==
The station started operations on 14 February 1918. At that time, it was an intermediate station on the privately run 762 mm gauge Ehime Railway between Ōzu (now Iyo-Ōzu and Nagahama-machi (now Iyo-Nagahama and was known as Kaya Station (加屋駅, Kaya Eki). On 16 July 1928, the station location was moved to its present location. Ehime Railways was nationalized on 1 October 1933 and Japanese Government Railways (JGR) assumed control, renamed it Iyo-Shirataki and operated the station as part of the Ehime Line. With the privatization of JNR on 1 April 1987, the station came under the control of JR Shikoku.

== Surrounding area ==
- Shirataki Park - located about 400 m from the station. The station name Iyo-Shirataki comes from the Shirataki waterfall (白滝) found in the park.

== See also ==
- List of railway stations in Japan
