= Iyo-Izushi Station =

Railway station in Ōzu, Ehime Prefecture, Japan

S13 Iyo-Izushi Station 伊予出石駅
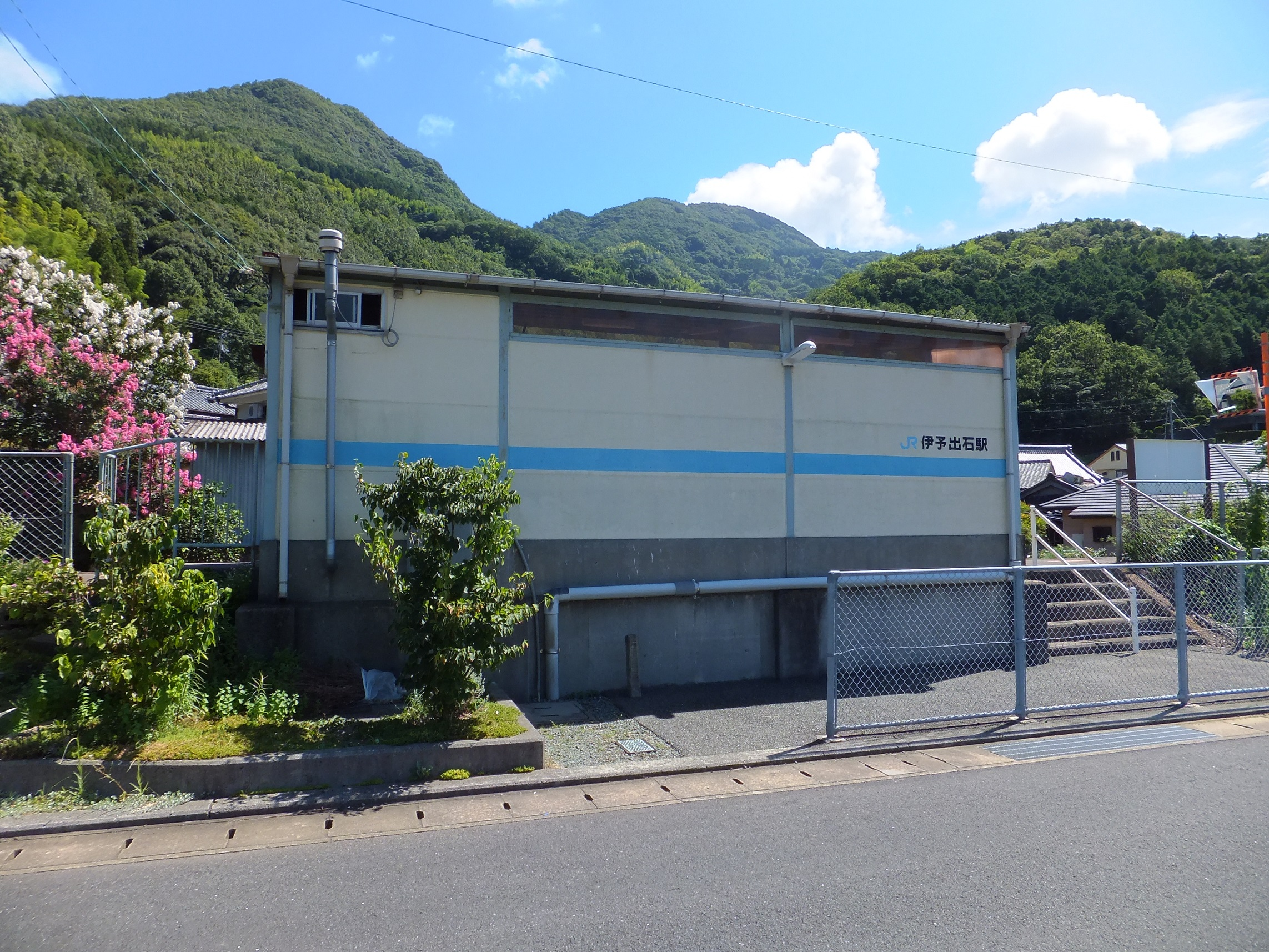
- Iyo-Izushi Station, August 2020

General information
- Location: Nagahamacho Joromatsu, Ōzu City, Ehime Prefecture 799-3444; Japan
- Coordinates: 33°35′47″N 132°29′56″E
- Operator: JR Shikoku
- Line: Yosan Line
- Distance: 235.9 km (146.6 mi) from Takamatsu
- Platforms: 1 side platform
- Tracks: 1

Construction
- Structure type: At grade
- Cycle facilities: Bike shed
- Accessible: No - steps lead up to platform from access road

Other information
- Status: Unstaffed
- Station code: S13

History
- Opened: 14 February 1918; 108 years ago
- Former names: Jyoromatsu

Passengers
- FY2019: 50

Services
Preceding station	JR Shikoku	Following station
Iyo-Shirataki S14 towards Uwajima	Yosan Line via Iyo-Nagahama	Iyo-Nagahama S12 towards Takamatsu
Location
- Location within Ehime Prefecture Location within Japan

Iyo-Izushi Station (伊予出石駅, Iyo-Izushi-eki) is a passenger railway station located in the city of Ōzu, Ehime Prefecture, Japan. It is operated by JR Shikoku and has the station number "S13".

== Lines ==
Iyo-Izushi Station is located on the older, original, branch of the Yosan Line which runs along the coast from Mukaibara to Iyo-Ōzu and is 235.9 km from the beginning of the line at Takamatsu. Only local trains stop at the station. Eastbound local services end at Matsuyama. Connections with other services are needed to travel further east of Matsuyama on the line.

== Layout ==
The station, which is unstaffed, consists of a side platform serving a single track. There is no station building, only a shelter on the platform for waiting passengers. A flight of steps leads up to the platform from the access road. A bike shed is provided nearby.

== History ==
The station opened as Jyoromatsu Station (上老松駅, Jyoromatsu-eki) on 14 February 1918. At that time, it was an intermediate station on the privately run 762 mm gauge Ehime Railway between Ōzu (now Iyo-Ōzu and Nagahama-machi (now Iyo-Nagahama. When the company was nationalized on 1 October 1933, Japanese Government Railways (JGR) assumed control and operated the station as part of the Ehime Line. When the track was regauged to 1067 mm and Iyo-Nagahama was linked up with Kitanada on 6 October 1935, the entire stretch including Jyoromatsu became part of the Yosan Mainline from Takamatsu to Iyo-Ōzu. On 1 April 1950, Jyoromatsu was renamed Iyo-Izushi. With the privatization of JNR on 1 April 1987, the station came under the control of JR Shikoku.

== Surrounding area ==
- Hijikawa - Yamato Bridge
- Ozu Municipal Yamato Elementary Scho

== See also ==
- List of railway stations in Japan
