= Haruka Station =

Railway station in Ōzu, Ehime Prefecture, Japan

S16 Haruka Station 春賀駅
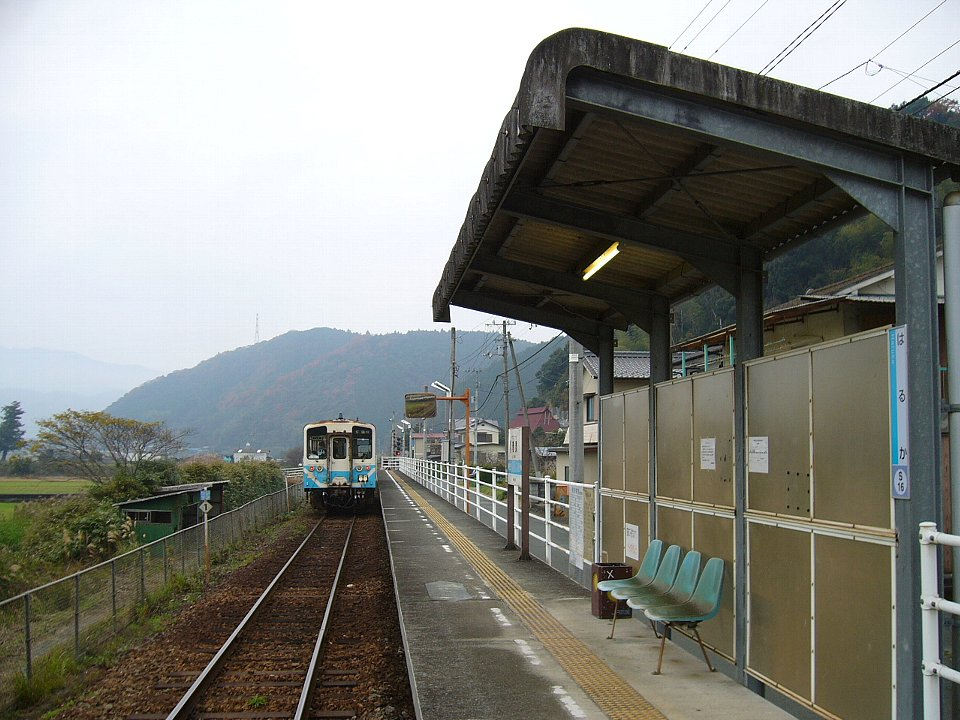
- Haruka Station, December 2006

General information
- Location: Haruka, Ōzu City, Ehime Prefecture 795-0046; Japan
- Coordinates: 33°33′21″N 132°33′19″E
- Operator: JR Shikoku
- Line: Yosan Line
- Distance: 243.4 km (151.2 mi) from Takamatsu
- Platforms: 1 side platform
- Tracks: 1

Construction
- Structure type: At grade
- Accessible: Yes - ramp to platform from access road

Other information
- Status: Unstaffed
- Station code: S16

History
- Opened: 20 October 1961; 64 years ago

Passengers
- FY2019: 26

Services
Preceding station	JR Shikoku	Following station
Gorō S17 towards Uwajima	Yosan Line via Iyo-Nagahama	Hataki S15 towards Takamatsu
Location
- Location within Ehime Prefecture Location within Japan

Haruka Station (春賀駅, Haruka-eki) is a passenger railway station located in the city of Ōzu, Ehime Prefecture, Japan. It is operated by JR Shikoku and has the station number "S16".

== Lines ==
Haruka Station is located on the older, original, branch of the Yosan Line which runs along the coast from Mukaibara to Iyo-Ōzu and is 243.4 km from the beginning of the line at Takamatsu. Only local trains stop at the station. Eastbound local services end at Matsuyama. Connections with other services are needed to travel further east of Matsuyama on the line.

== Layout ==
The station, which is unstaffed, consists of a side platform serving a single track. There is no station building, only a shelter on the platform for waiting passengers. A ramp up to the platform from the access road.

== History ==
Japanese National Railways (JNR) opened the station on 20 October 1961 as an added stop on the existing Yosan Line. With the privatization of JNR on 1 April 1987, the station came under the control of JR Shikoku.

== Surrounding area ==
- Ozu City Miyoshi Contact Office
- Ozu City Miyoshi Elementary School

== See also ==
- List of railway stations in Japan
