= Iyo-Hirano Station =

Railway station in Ōzu, Ehime Prefecture, Japan

U16 Iyo-Hirano Station 伊予平野駅
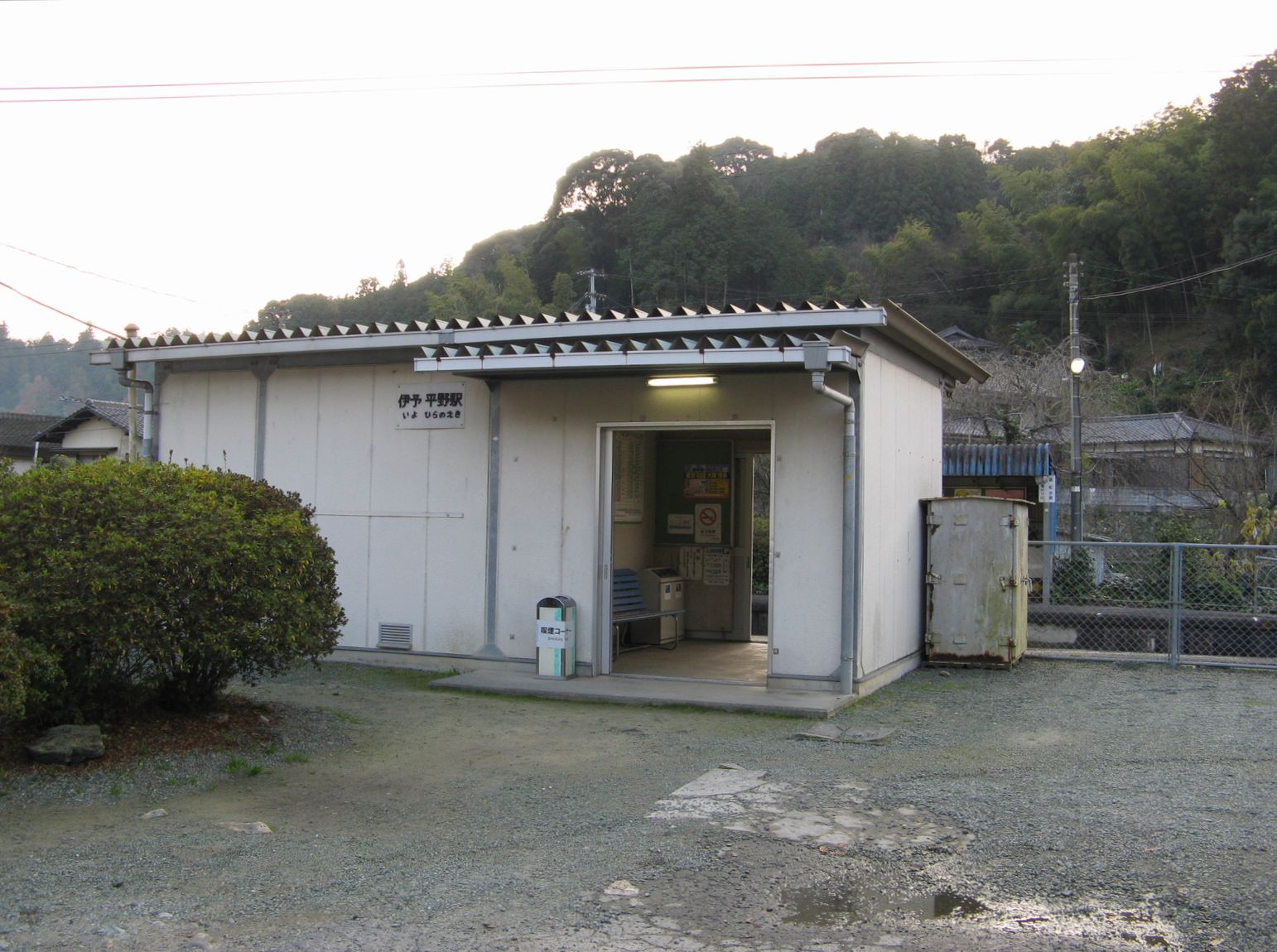
- Iyo-Hirano Station, December 2008

General information
- Location: Hiranocho Noda, Ōzu City, Ehime Prefecture 795-0021; Japan
- Coordinates: 33°29′44″N 132°31′05″E
- Operator: JR Shikoku
- Line: Yosan Line
- Distance: 247.2 km (153.6 mi) from Takamatsu
- Platforms: 2 side platforms
- Tracks: 2 + 1 siding

Construction
- Structure type: At grade
- Cycle facilities: Bike shed
- Accessible: No - platforms linked by level crossing with steps

Other information
- Status: Unstaffed
- Station code: U16

History
- Opened: 19 September 1936; 89 years ago

Passengers
- FY2019: 56

Services
Preceding station	JR Shikoku	Following station
Senjō U17 towards Uwajima	Yosan Line	Nishi-Ōzu U15 towards Takamatsu
Location
- Location within Ehime Prefecture Location within Japan

Iyo-Hirano Station (伊予平野駅, Iyo-Hirano-eki) is a passenger railway station located in the city of Ōzu, Ehime Prefecture, Japan. It is operated by JR Shikoku and has the station number "U16".

== Lines ==
Iyo-Hirano Station is served by the JR Shikoku Yosan Line and is located 247.2 km from the start of the line at Takamatsu. Only local trains stop at the station and the eastbound trains terminate at Matsuyama. Connections with other services are needed to travel further east of Matsuyama on the line.

== Layout ==
The station consists of two opposed side platforms serving two tracks. A small station building is unstaffed and serves only as a waiting room. Access to the opposite platform is by means of a level crossing with steps at both ends. A bike shed is provided near station. A siding branches off track 1 and ends near the station building and is used by track maintenance equipment.

== History ==
The station was opened on 19 September 1936 when the then Yosan Mainline was extended westwards from Iyo-Ōzu. Iyo-Hirano was the western terminus of the line until 6 February 1939 when the track was further extended to Senjō. At that time, the station was operated by Japanese Government Railways (JGR), later becoming Japanese National Railways (JNR). With the privatization of JNR on 1 April 1987, control of the station passed to JR Shikoku.

== Surrounding area ==
- Ozu Municipal Hirano Junior High School
- Ozu City Hirano Elementary School

== See also ==
- List of railway stations in Japan
