= Nishi-Ōzu Station =

Railway station in Ōzu, Ehime Prefecture, Japan

U15 Nishi-Ōzu Station 西大洲駅
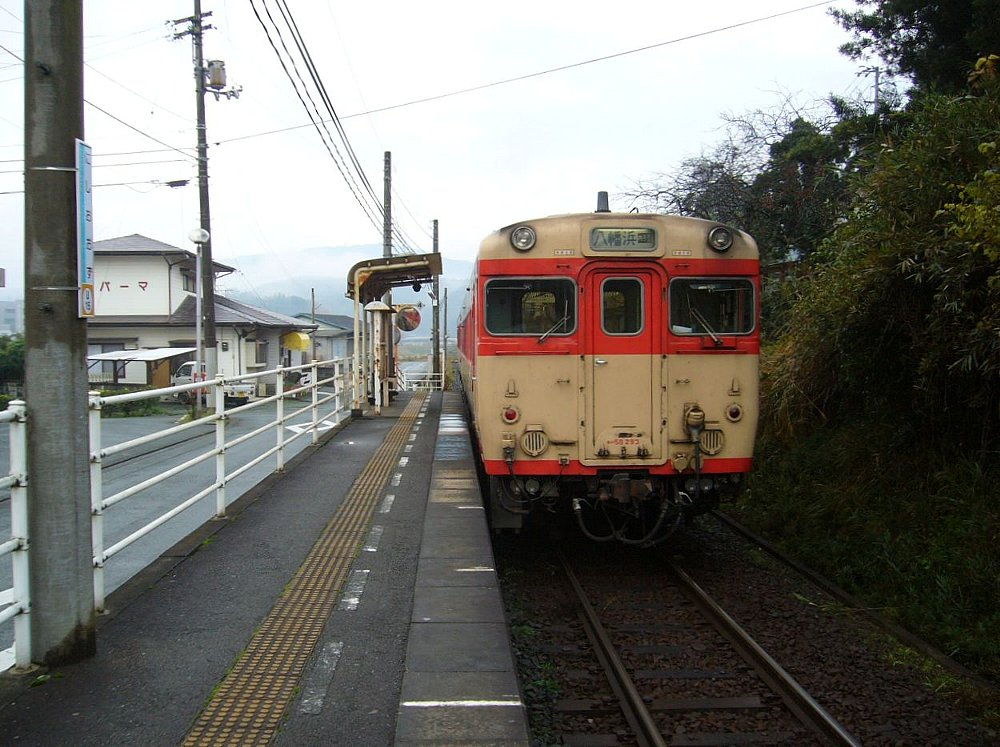
- JNR class KiHa58 at Nishi-Ōzu Station, 2006

General information
- Location: Azo, Ōzu City, Ehime Prefecture 795-0025; Japan
- Coordinates: 33°30′30″N 132°31′37″E
- Operator: JR Shikoku
- Line: Yosan Line
- Distance: 245.3 km (152.4 mi) from Takamatsu
- Platforms: 1 side platform
- Tracks: 1

Construction
- Structure type: At grade
- Cycle facilities: Bike shed
- Accessible: Yes - ramp to platform

Other information
- Status: Unstaffed
- Station code: U15

History
- Opened: 20 October 1961; 64 years ago

Passengers
- FY2019: 80

Services
Preceding station	JR Shikoku	Following station
Iyo-Hirano U16 towards Uwajima	Yosan Line	Iyo-Ōzu U14 S18 towards Takamatsu
Location
- Location within Ehime Prefecture Location within Japan

Nishi-Ōzu Station (西大洲駅, Nishi-Ōzu-eki) is a passenger railway station located in the city of Ōzu, Ehime Prefecture, Japan. It is operated by JR Shikoku and has the station number "U15".

== Lines ==
Nishi-Ōzu Station is served by the JR Shikoku Yosan Line and is located 245.3 km from the start of the line at Takamatsu. Only local trains stop at the station and the eastbound trains terminate at Matsuyama. Connections with other services are needed to travel further east of Matsuyama on the line.

== Layout ==
The station consists of a side platform serving a single track. There is no station building, only a simple shelter for waiting passengers. A ramp leads up to the platform from the access road. A bike shed is provided near the base of the ramp.

== History ==
Japanese National Railways (JNR) opened the station as an added stop on the existing Yosan Line on 20 October 1961. With the privatization of JNR on 1 April 1987, control of the station passed to JR Shikoku.

== Surrounding area ==
- Municipal Ozu Hospital
- Ozu City Kume Elementary School

== See also ==
- List of railway stations in Japan
