= Senjō Station =

Railway station in Yawatahama, Ehime Prefecture, Japan

U17 Senjō Station 千丈駅
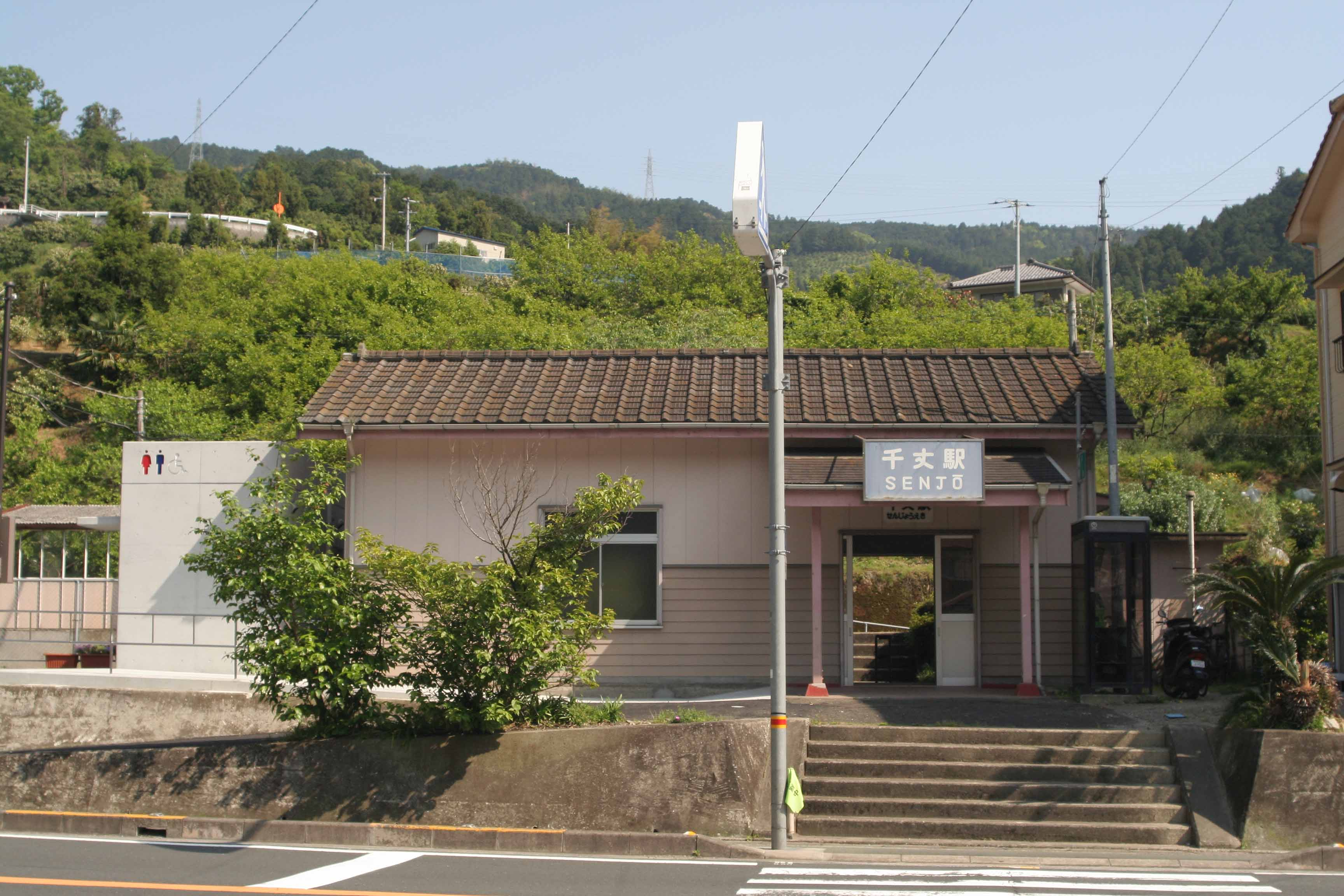
- Senjō Station in 2007

General information
- Location: Go, Yawatahama City, Ehime Prefecture 796-8020; Japan
- Coordinates: 33°27′55″N 132°27′26″E
- Operator: JR Shikoku
- Line: Yosan Line
- Distance: 260.6 km (161.9 mi) from Takamatsu
- Platforms: 2 side platforms
- Tracks: 2

Construction
- Structure type: At grade
- Accessible: No - platforms linked by level crossing with steps

Other information
- Status: Unstaffed
- Station code: U17

History
- Opened: 2 June 1939; 87 years ago

Passengers
- FY2019: 8

Services
Preceding station	JR Shikoku	Following station
Yawatahama U18 towards Uwajima	Yosan Line	Iyo-Hirano U16 towards Takamatsu
Location
- Location within Ehime Prefecture Location within Japan

Senjō Station (千丈駅, Senjō-eki) is a passenger railway station located in the city of Yawatahama, Ehime Prefecture, Japan. It is operated by JR Shikoku and has the station number "U17".

== Lines ==
Senjō Station is served by the JR Shikoku Yosan Line and is located 260.6 km from the start of the line at Takamatsu. Only local trains stop at the station and the eastbound trains terminate at Matsuyama. Connections with other services are needed to travel further east of Matsuyama on the line.

== Layout ==
The station consists of two opposed side platforms serving two tracks. The station building is unstaffed and serves only as a waiting room. Access to the opposite platform is by means of a level crossing with steps at both ends.

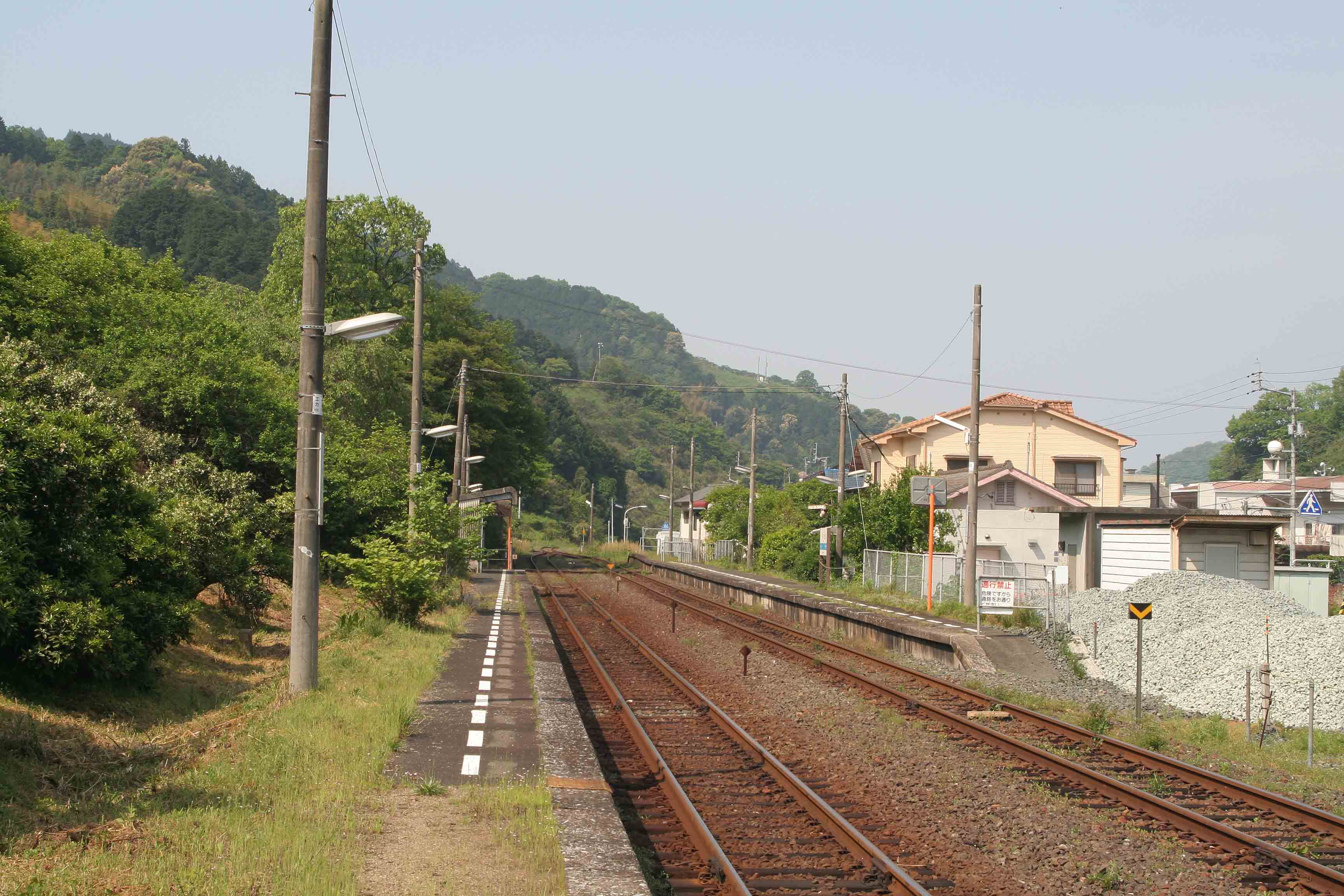
A view of the station platforms. The level crossing can be seen in the distance.

== History ==
Senjō Station was opened on 6 February 1939 as an intermediate stop when the then Yosan Mainline was extended westwards from Iyo-Hirano towards Yawatahama. At that time, the station was operated by Japanese Government Railways (JGR), later becoming Japanese National Railways (JNR). With the privatization of JNR on 1 April 1987, control of the station passed to JR Shikoku.

== Surrounding area ==
- Yawatahama Municipal Senjo Elementary School
- Yawatahama Municipal Senjo Nursery School
- Narutaki Shrine

== See also ==
- List of railway stations in Japan
