= Ōzu, Ehime =

Ōzu 大洲市
- City
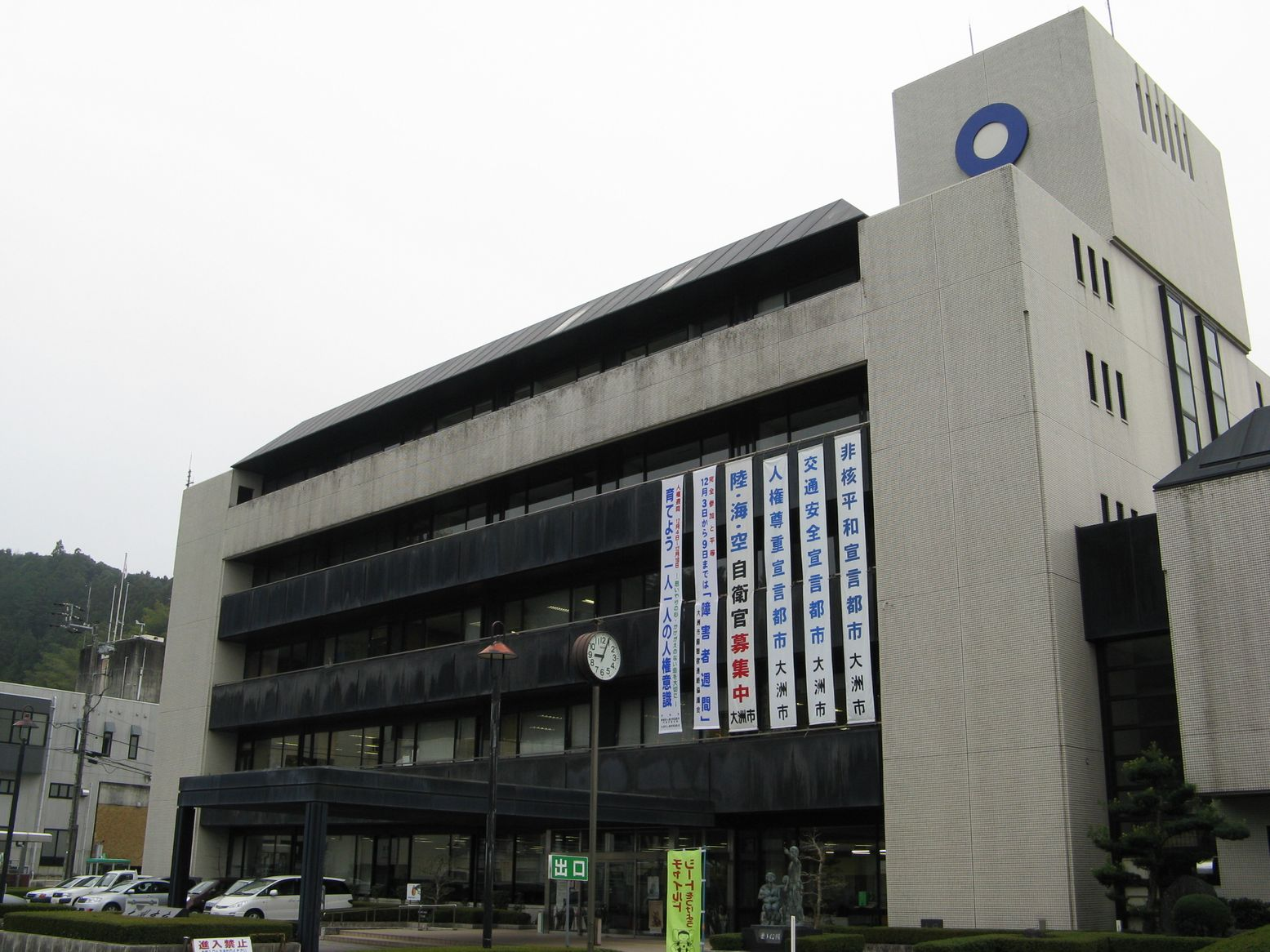
- Ōzu city hall

- Flag Emblem
- Location of Ōzu in Ehime Prefecture

- Location in Japan
- Coordinates: 33°30′N 132°33′E
- Country: Japan
- Region: Shikoku
- Prefecture: Ehime

Government
  - Mayor: Ninomiya Takahisa (since March 2018)

Area
  - Total: 432.22 km^{2} (166.88 sq mi)

Population (January 31, 2020)
  - Total: 40,723
  - Density: 94.218/km^{2} (244.02/sq mi)
- Time zone: UTC+09:00 (JST)
- City hall address: 690-1 Ōzu, Ōzu-shi, Ehime-ken; 795-8601
- Climate: Cfa
- Website: Official website

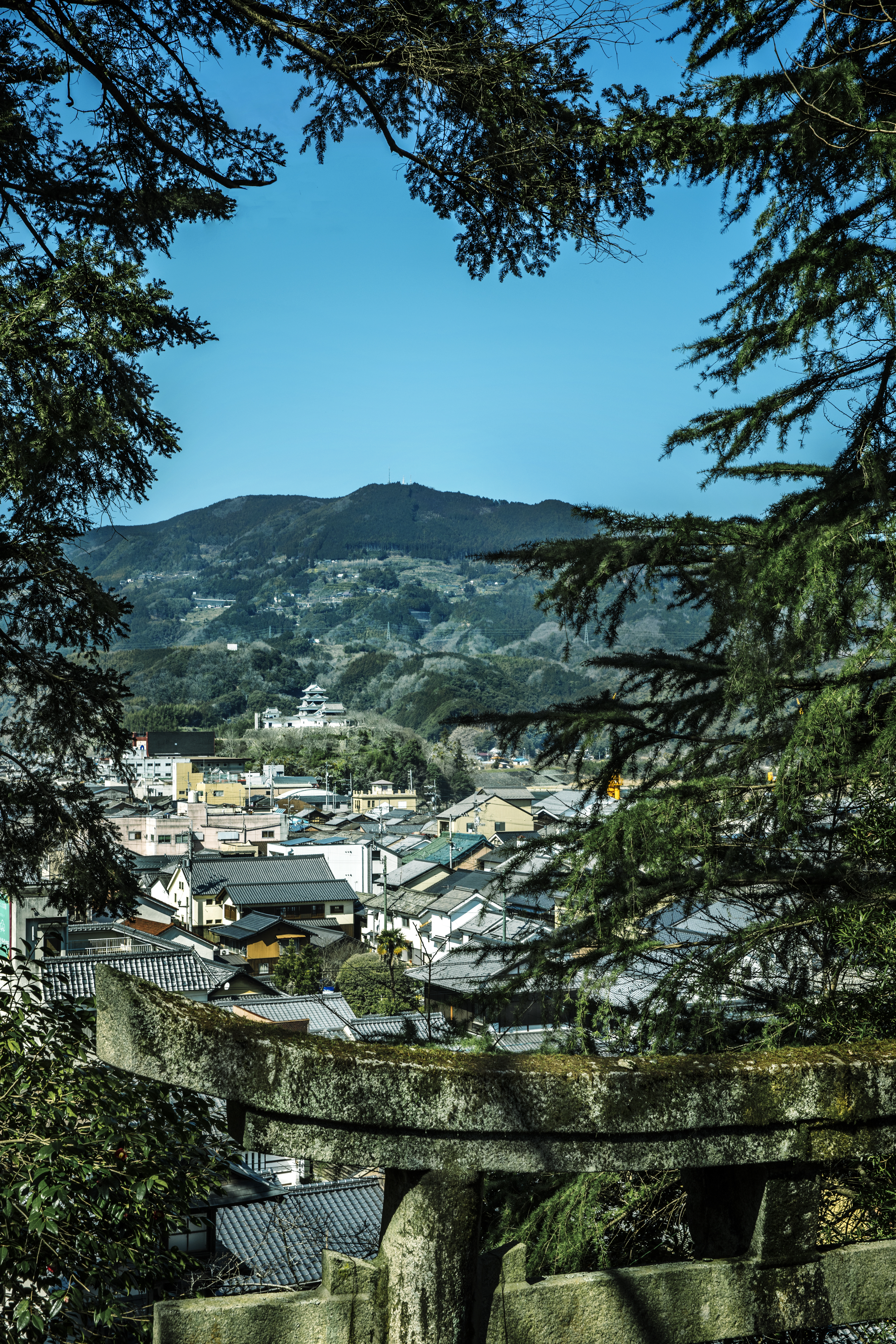
Overview of downtown Ōzu

Ōzu (大洲市, Ōzu-shi; Japanese pronunciation: [ò̞ó̞.(d͡)zɨ́(.ɕì), ó̞ó̞-]) is a Japanese city located in Nanyo, the region occupying the southern half of Ehime Prefecture. As of 31 August 2022, the city had an estimated population of 40,723 in 19688 households and a population density of 94 persons per km^{2}. The total area of the city is 432.22 square kilometres (166.88 sq mi).

== Geography ==
Ōzu is located of the middle and lower reaches of the Hiji River, and in particular the basin at the confluence the Hiji River and the Yaochi River in the island Shikoku. It extends from a coastline on the Gulf of Iyo in the Seto Inland Sea to some points over 1000 meters above sea level at the headwaters of the Kawabe River, a tributary of the Hiji River.

=== Neighbouring municipalities ===
Ehime Prefecture

- Iyo
- Matsuyama
- Seiyo
- Uchiko
- Yawatahama

=== Climate ===
Ōzu has a humid subtropical climate (Köppen Cfa) characterized by warm summers and cool winters with light snowfall. The average annual temperature in Ōzu is 15.2 °C. The average annual rainfall is 1644 mm with September as the wettest month. The temperatures are highest on average in August, at around 26.1 °C, and lowest in January, at around 4.6 °C.

Climate data for Ōzu, Ehime (1991−2020 normals, extremes 1978−present)
Month	Jan	Feb	Mar	Apr	May	Jun	Jul	Aug	Sep	Oct	Nov	Dec	Year
Record high °C (°F)	21.4 (70.5)	24.4 (75.9)	28.1 (82.6)	32.2 (90.0)	34.5 (94.1)	34.9 (94.8)	38.2 (100.8)	38.3 (100.9)	37.4 (99.3)	32.6 (90.7)	28.4 (83.1)	24.5 (76.1)	38.3 (100.9)
Mean daily maximum °C (°F)	9.8 (49.6)	11.2 (52.2)	15.2 (59.4)	20.9 (69.6)	25.6 (78.1)	28.0 (82.4)	32.2 (90.0)	33.4 (92.1)	29.4 (84.9)	23.8 (74.8)	17.8 (64.0)	12.0 (53.6)	21.6 (70.9)
Daily mean °C (°F)	5.1 (41.2)	5.8 (42.4)	9.2 (48.6)	14.2 (57.6)	18.9 (66.0)	22.6 (72.7)	26.7 (80.1)	27.4 (81.3)	23.7 (74.7)	17.8 (64.0)	12.1 (53.8)	7.0 (44.6)	15.9 (60.6)
Mean daily minimum °C (°F)	1.2 (34.2)	1.4 (34.5)	4.0 (39.2)	8.4 (47.1)	13.2 (55.8)	18.5 (65.3)	22.7 (72.9)	23.2 (73.8)	19.7 (67.5)	13.6 (56.5)	8.0 (46.4)	3.3 (37.9)	11.4 (52.6)
Record low °C (°F)	−5.0 (23.0)	−7.3 (18.9)	−4.2 (24.4)	−1.0 (30.2)	3.7 (38.7)	8.8 (47.8)	14.0 (57.2)	15.6 (60.1)	8.3 (46.9)	2.4 (36.3)	−0.4 (31.3)	−4.7 (23.5)	−7.3 (18.9)
Average precipitation mm (inches)	74.8 (2.94)	87.4 (3.44)	119.5 (4.70)	127.5 (5.02)	149.8 (5.90)	282.9 (11.14)	234.9 (9.25)	138.1 (5.44)	175.6 (6.91)	124.0 (4.88)	94.5 (3.72)	94.9 (3.74)	1,700.8 (66.96)
Average precipitation days (≥ 1.0 mm)	10.6	10.1	11.6	10.2	9.3	12.9	10.5	8.6	10.1	8.3	9.3	11.8	123.3
Mean monthly sunshine hours	86.2	113.5	154.6	179.4	190.5	127.2	176.0	200.3	148.2	140.4	104.8	81.4	1,708.4
Source: Japan Meteorological Agency

== Demographics ==
Per Japanese census data, the population of Ōzu has decreased steadily since the 1960s.

Historical population
Year	Pop.	±%
1920	4,848	—
1930	5,170	+6.6%
1940	4,975	−3.8%
1950	7,293	+46.6%
1960	72,480	+893.8%
1970	58,755	−18.9%
1980	57,014	−3.0%
1990	55,766	−2.2%
2000	52,762	−5.4%
2010	47,157	−10.6%
2020	40,575	−14.0%

== History ==
The area of Ōzu was part of ancient Iyo Province. During the Sengoku period, it was part of the holdings of Tōdō Takatora, who constructed Ōzu Castle on top of a previous fortification dating to the Kamakura period. In 1608, he was transferred and replaced by the Wakizaka clan, followed in 1617 by the Katō clan, who ruled the 66,000 koku Ōzu Domain under the Tokugawa shogunate. Ōzu developed in the Edo period as a castle town. The town of Ōzu was established within Kita District, Ehime with the establishment of the modern municipalities system on December 15, 1889. During the Meiji and Taishō periods (late 19th century, early 20th century), Ōzu saw great economic expansion due to thriving silk and Japanese wax candle (和蠟燭, warōsoku) industries. A robust timber trade also occurred during this time, with Hiji River serving as a transportation artery. However, transformations brought by the arrival of railways and motorways disrupted the balance of the local economic cycle.

On September 1, 1954, town of Ōzu merged with the villages of Hirano (平野村), Awazu (粟津村), Miyoshi (三善村), Kamisukai (上須戒村), Minamikume (南久米村), Sugeta (菅田村), Niiya (新谷村), Yanagisawa (柳沢村) and Ōkawa (大川村) to form the city of Ōzu . On January 11, 2005 Ōzu annexed neighboring Nagahama, Hijikawa, and Kawabe municipalities.

== Government ==
Ōzu has a mayor-council form of government with a directly elected mayor and a unicameral city council of 21 members. Ōzu, together with the town of Uchiko contributes two members to the Ehime Prefectural Assembly.

In terms of national politics, Ōzu is part of Ehime 3rd district of the lower house of the Diet of Japan. Prior to 2022, the city was part of Ehime 4th district.

== Economy ==
Ōzu was once noted for its production of electronics; however, its factory by Matsushita Kotobuki Electronics closed in 2010 due to rapid deterioration in business performance. The economy is now centered on Agriculture (vegetables, livestock, citrus fruits) and forestry, with manufacturing of toothbrushes an important local product.

== Education ==
Ōzu has 20 public elementary schools and nine public middle schools operated by the city government, and four public high schools operated by the Ehime Prefectural Board of Education. The city also has one private middle school and two private high schools.

== Transportation ==
=== Railway ===
Shikoku Railway Company – Yosan Line

- Kitanada – Iyo-Nagahama – Iyo-Izushi – Iyo-Shirataki – Hataki – Haruka – Gorō – Iyo-Ōzu – Nishi-Ōzu – Iyo-Hirano
- Niiya – Iyo-Ōzu

Shikoku Railway Company – Uchiko Line

- Niiya – Kitayama

=== Highways ===
- Matsuyama Expressway
- National Route 56
- National Route 197
- National Route 378
- National Route 441

== Local attractions ==
Ōzu's flourishing silk and wax industries brought great wealth and prosperity, particularly at the turn of 20th century. Refinement and cultural discernment followed suit. This resulted in a thriving urban environment of various historical layers, remnants of which are still standing:

-Garyū Sansō (臥龍山荘) Set of three tea pavilions within a lavish roji (路地) -tea ceremony garden- overhanging the Hiji River. Built by silk and tea trade champion Torajiro (河内 寅次郎, Kōuchi Torajiro) as a personal retreat. It doubled as a Noh Theatre stage and was berth of the local kaketsukuri (懸け造り) architecture style. Completed between 1901 and 1907. (Important Cultural Property from 2016)

-Nagahama Great Bridge (長浜大橋, Nagahama Ōhashi) completed in 1935, Inscribed as Important Cultural Property by the Agency for Cultural Affairs in 2014, it is the oldest bascule-bridge in Japan still in operation. Traces of US forces' gunfire still punctuate parts of the structure.

-Nyohō Temple (如法寺, Nyohō-ji) Buddhist temple of the Rinzai sect founded in 1669 by monk Bankei (盤珪永琢 Bankei Yōtaku) together with Katō Yasuoki, second daimyo of the Katō clan. (Important Cultural Property since 1992). Its Zen meditation hall displays a Siddhattha Gotama (釈迦如来像, Shakanyorai-zō) sculpture, flanked by elevated tatami, a rather unusual setting in zazen (座禅) dedicated spaces .

-Ōzu Akarenga-kan (おおず赤煉瓦館) or Red Brick Wall. Main branch of former Ōzu Commercial Bank (大洲産業銀行, Ōzu Sangyō Ginkō) built in 1901, evoking Western architecture. Municipal Important Asset.

-Ōzu Castle (大洲城, Ōzu-jō) (four of its turrets were declared Important Cultural Property in 1957)

== Gallery ==
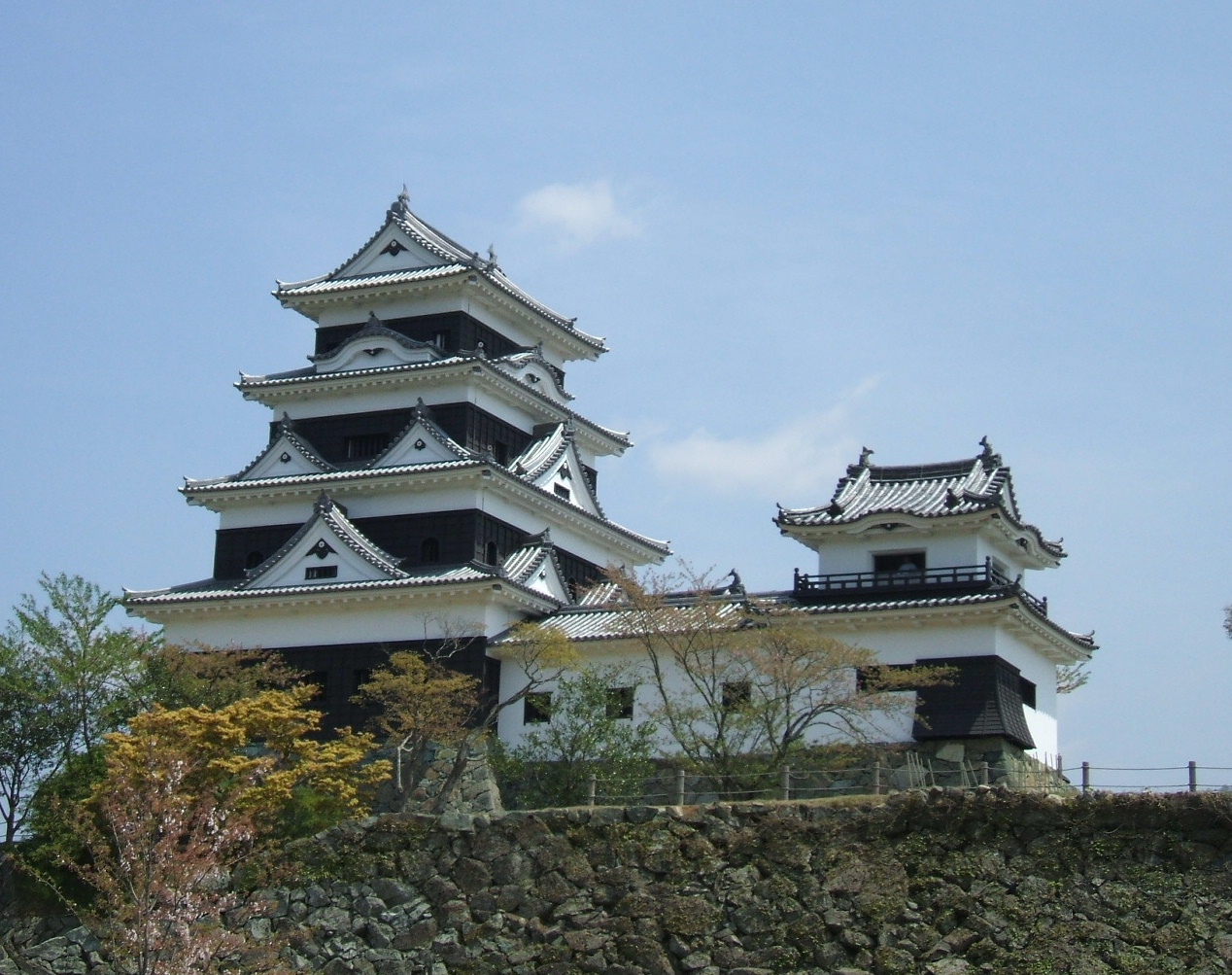
Ōzu Castle

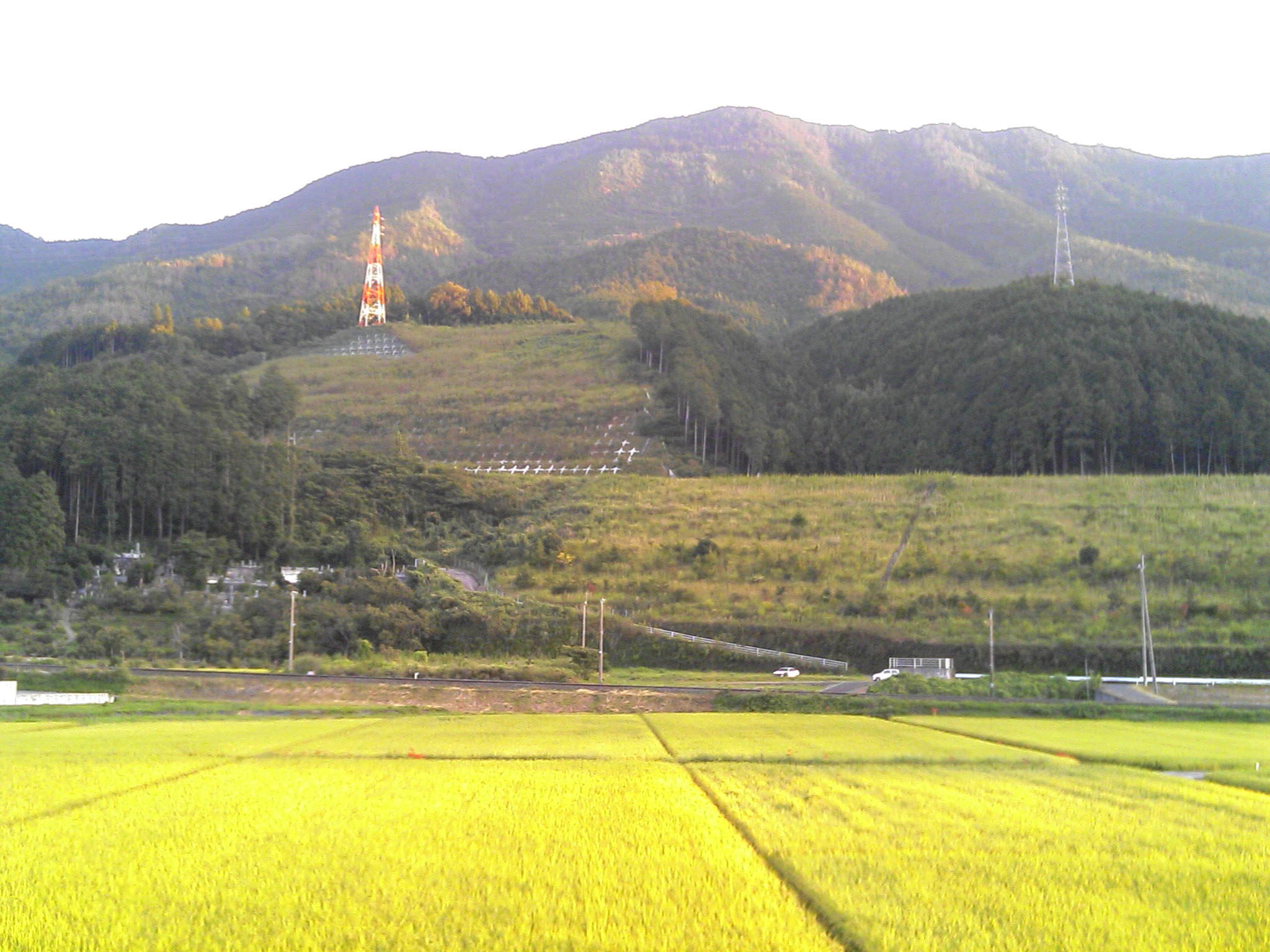
Rice paddies in Ōzu

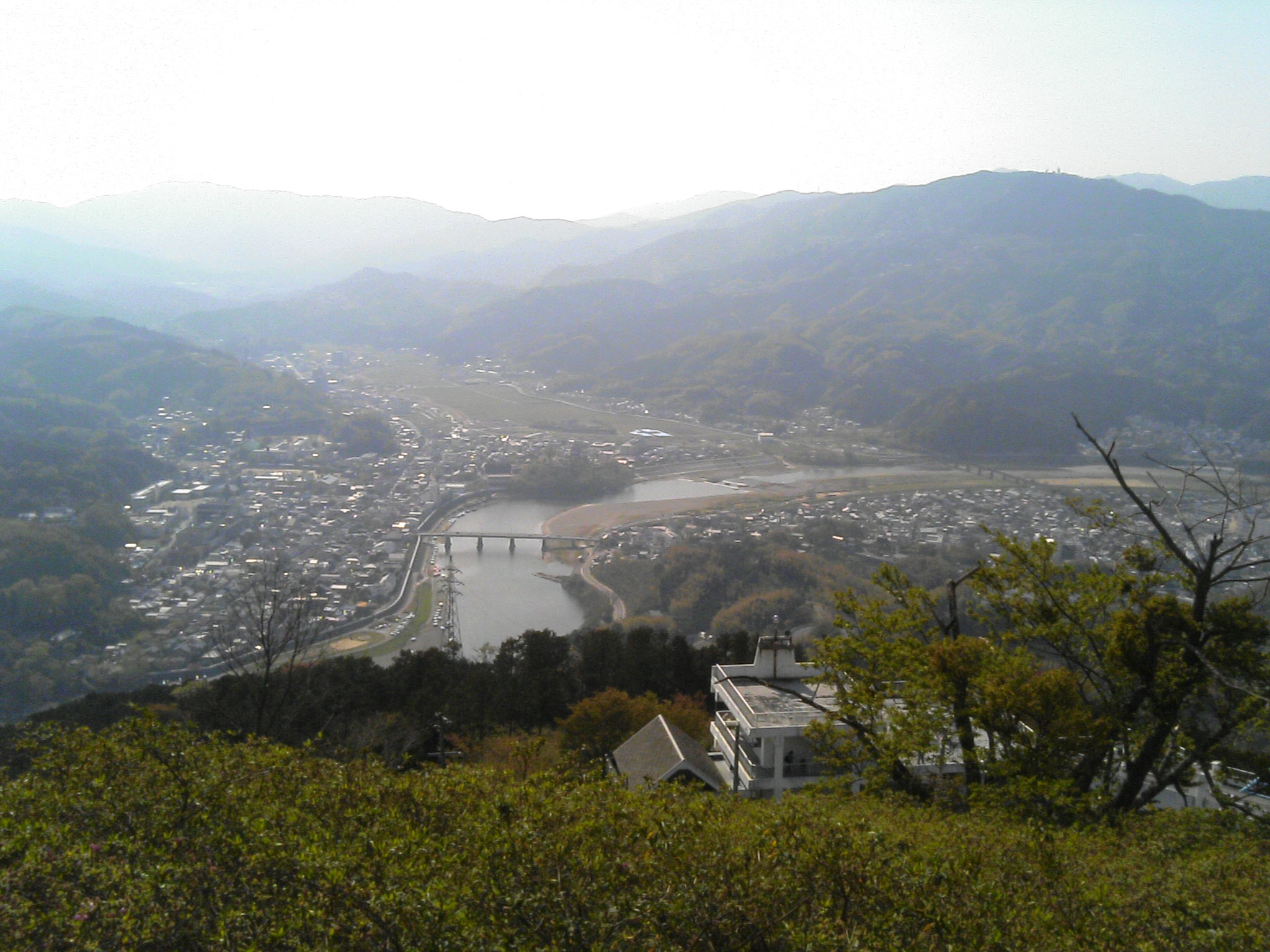
Downtown Ōzu as seen from atop Mount Tomisuyama

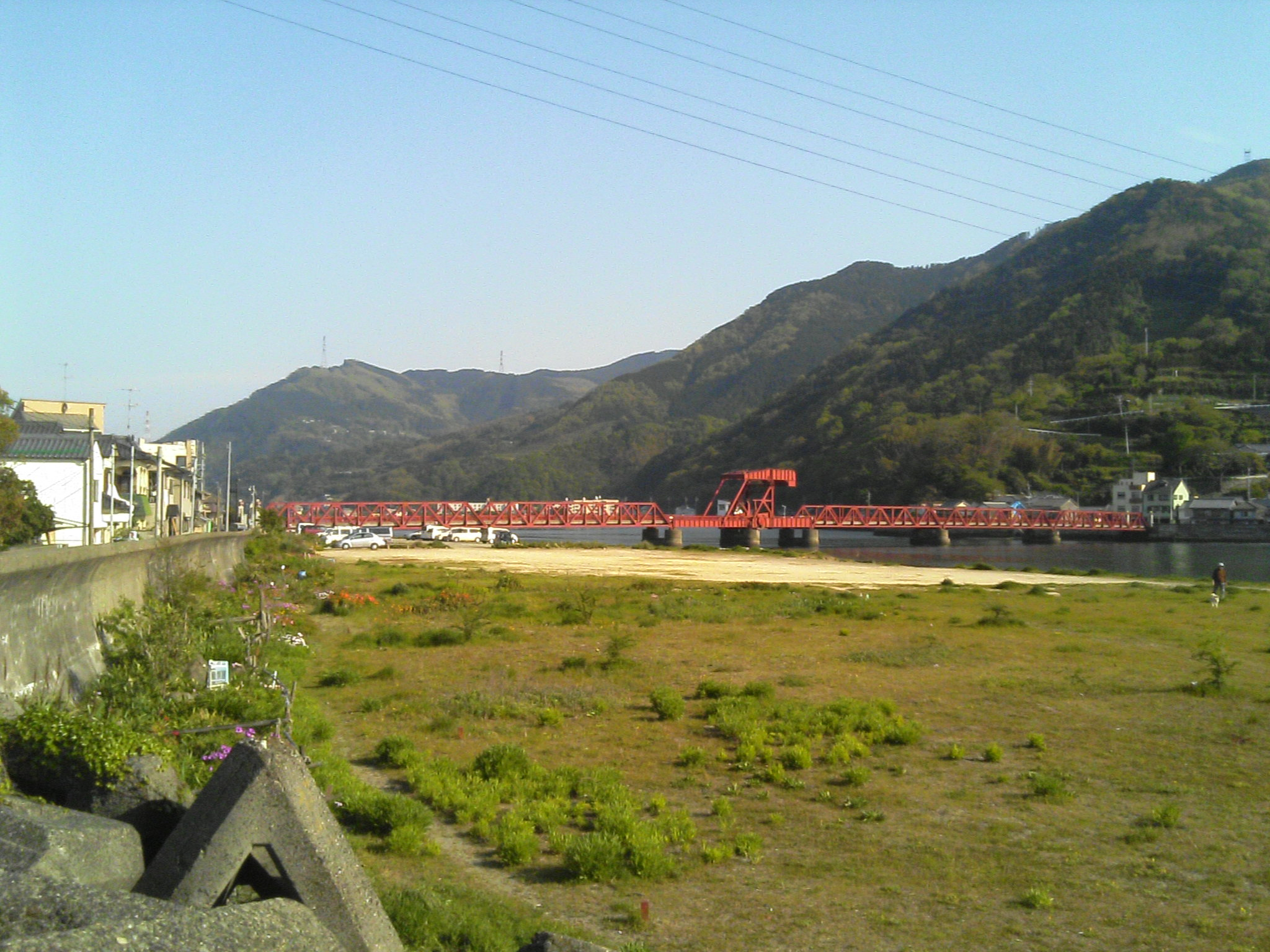
Nagahama's famous drawbridge
