= Kitanada Station =

Railway station in Ozu, Ehime prefecture, Japan

S11 Kitanada Station 喜多灘駅
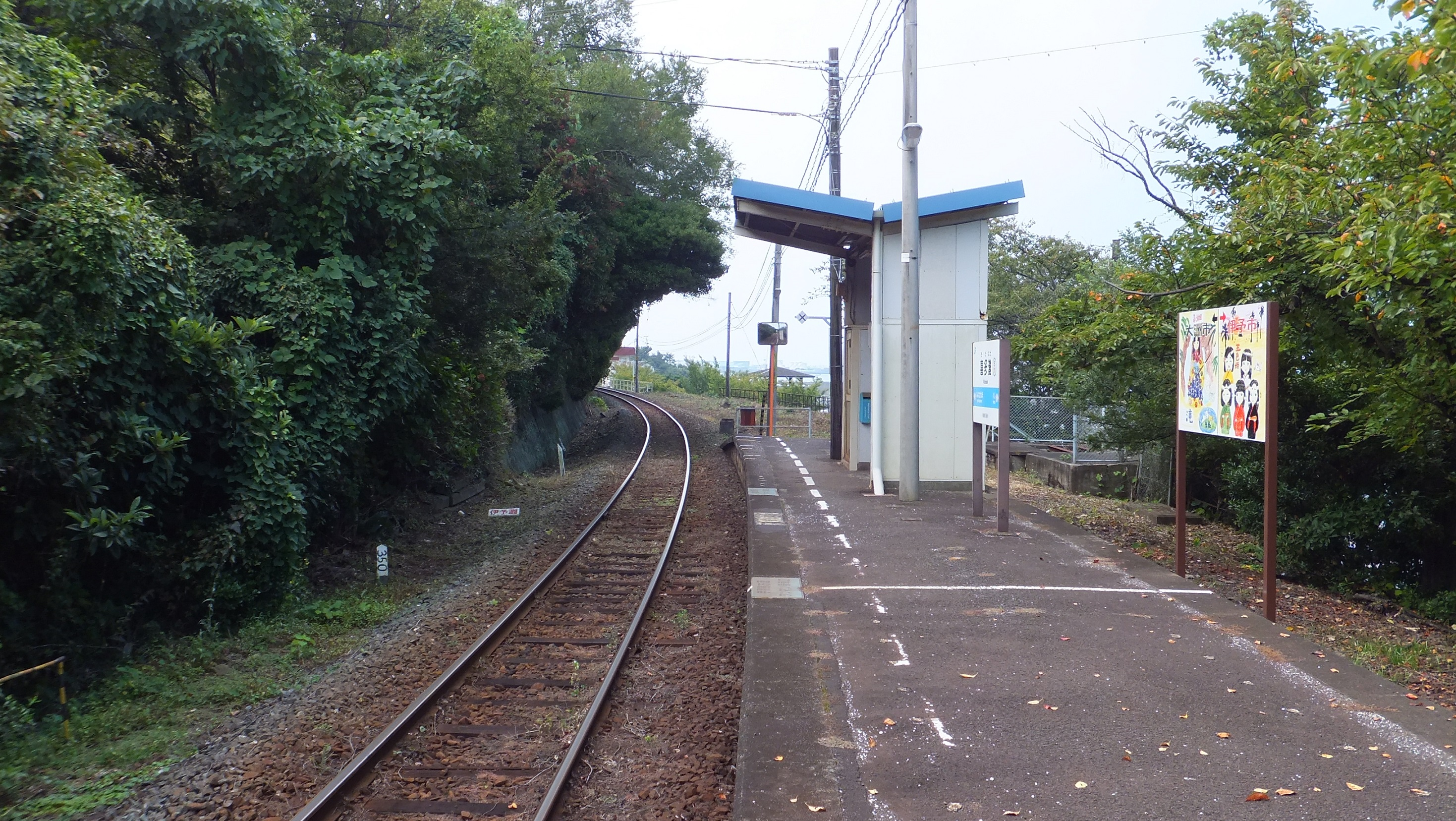
- Kitanada Station in 2015

General information
- Location: Nagahamacho Konbo, Ōzu City, Ehime Prefecture 799-3411; Japan
- Coordinates: 33°38′15″N 132°31′52″E
- Operator: JR Shikoku
- Line: Yosan Line
- Distance: 228.2 km (141.8 mi) from Takamatsu
- Platforms: 1 side platform
- Tracks: 1

Construction
- Structure type: At grade (sidehill cutting)

Other information
- Status: Unstaffed
- Station code: S11

History
- Opened: 6 October 1935; 90 years ago

Passengers
- FY2019: 30

Services
Preceding station	JR Shikoku	Following station
Iyo-Nagahama S12 towards Uwajima	Yosan Line via Iyo-Nagahama	Kushi S10 towards Takamatsu
Location
- Location within Ehime Prefecture Location within Japan

Kitanada Station (喜多灘駅, Kitanada-eki) is a passenger railway station in the city of Ōzu, Ehime Prefecture, Japan. It is operated by JR Shikoku and has the station number "S11".

== Lines ==
Kitanada Station is located on the older, original, branch of the Yosan Line which runs along the coast from Mukaibara to Iyo-Ōzu and is 228.2 km from the beginning of the line at Takamatsu. Only local trains stop at the station. Eastbouund local services end at Matsuyama. Connections with other services are needed to travel further east of Matsuyama on the line.

== Layout ==
The station consists of a side platform serving a single track on a sidehill cut. There is no station building, only a shelter for waiting passengers. A steep flight of steps leads up to the station from the main road. A toilet building is located at the base of the steps and there is limited parking. A siding branches off the track and leads to a disused freight platform. There are also traces of trackbed on the other side of the passenger platform, indicating that it was once an island serving two tracks.

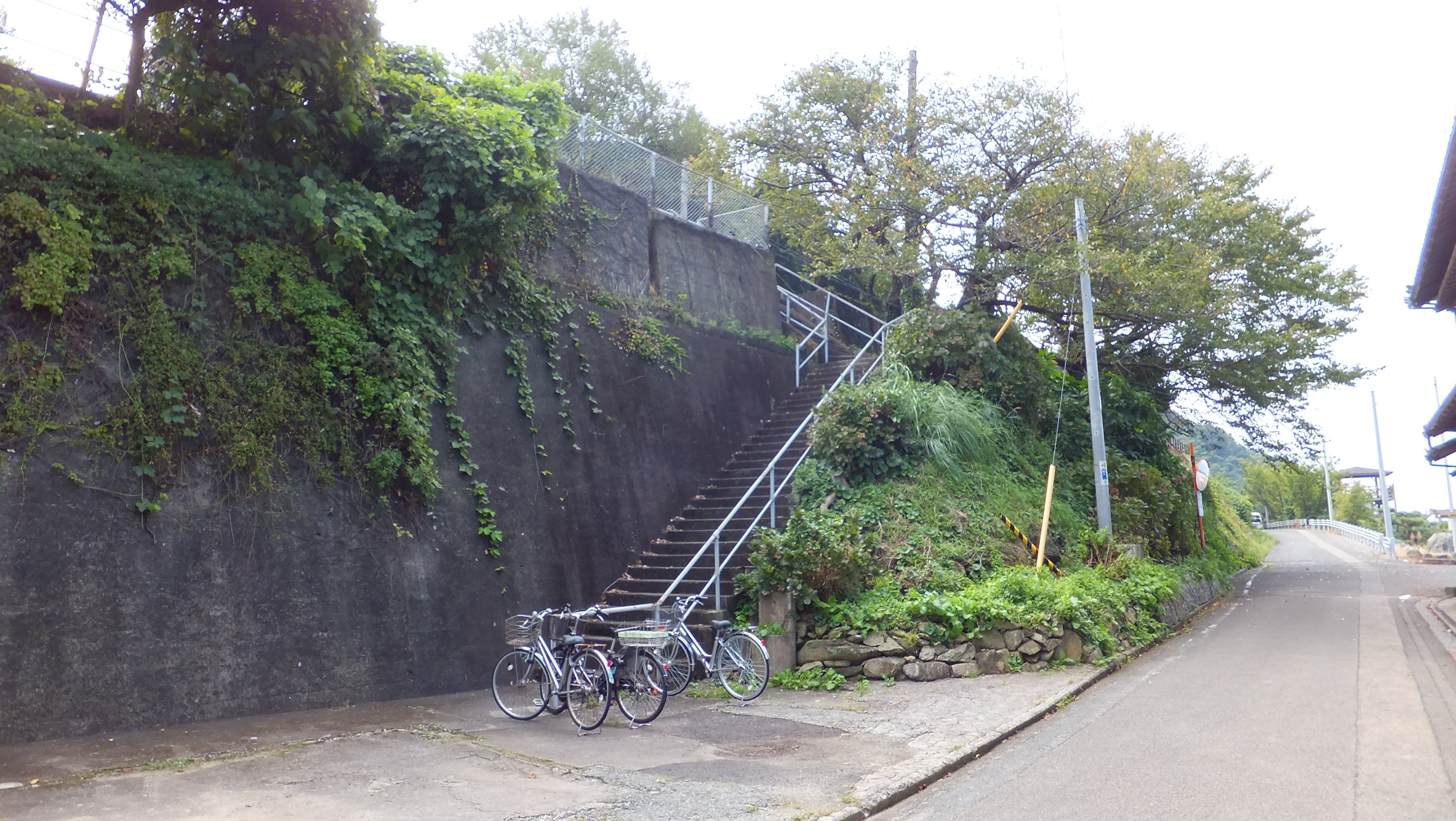
A view of the station entrance.

== History ==
The station was opened on 6 October 1935 as an intermediate stop when the then Yosan mainline was extended from Shimonada to Iyo-Nagahama, thus linking up with the track of the then Ehime Line and establishing through traffic from Takamatsu to Iyo-Ōzu. At that time the station was operated by Japanese Government Railways (JGR), later becoming Japanese National Railways (JNR). With the privatization of JNR on 1 April 1987, the station came under the control of JR Shikoku.

== Surrounding area ==
This station is on the border of Iyo and Ozu cities, and the city border runs through the middle of the platform. The sea can be clearly seen from the platform, and the coast can be reached just by walking for a few minutes from the station.

== See also ==
- List of railway stations in Japan
