= Iyo-Nagahama Station =

Railway station in Ōzu, Ehime Prefecture, Japan

S12 Iyo-Nagahama Station 伊予長浜駅
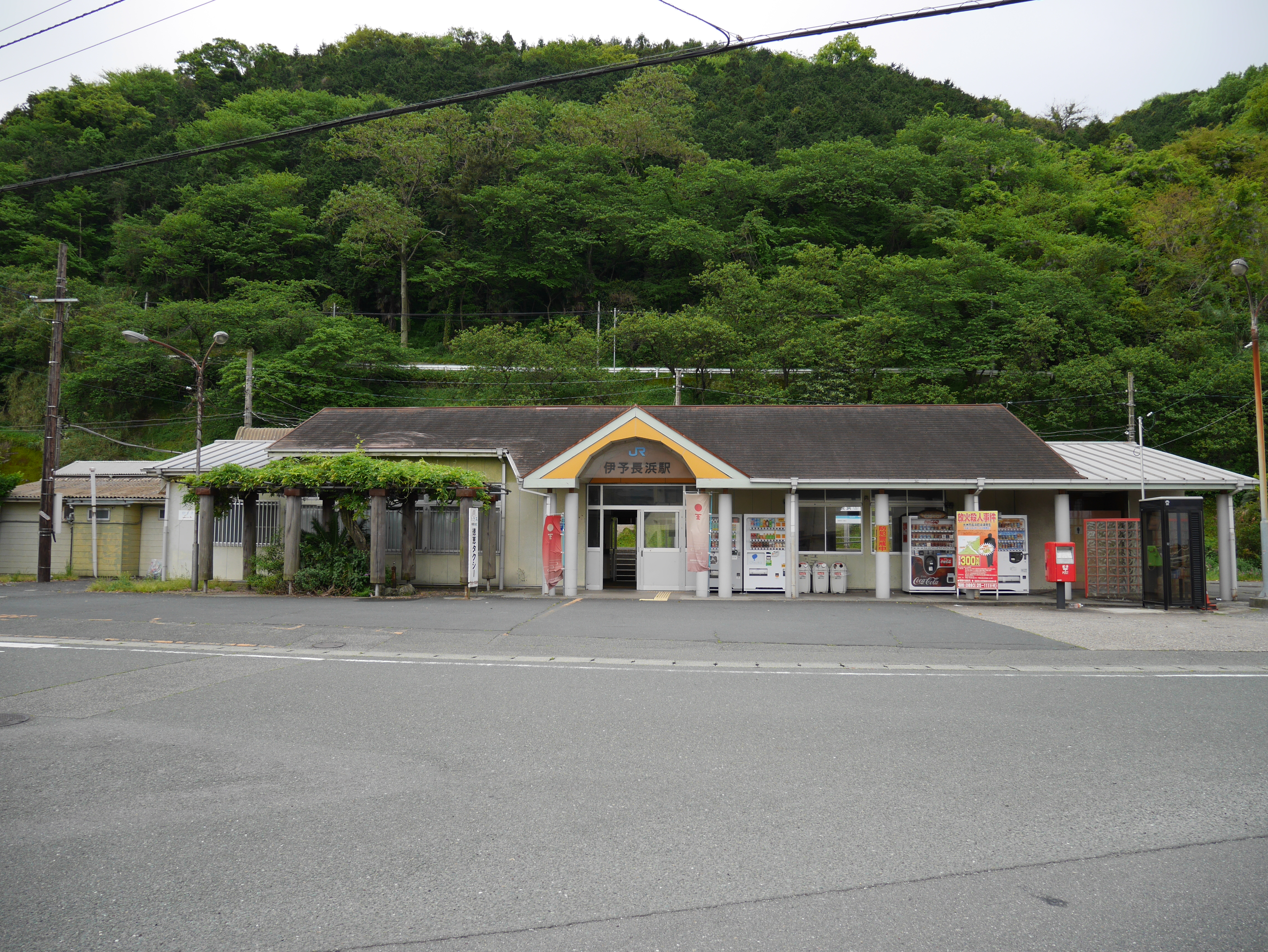
- Iyo-Nagahama Station in 2015

General information
- Location: Nagahama, Ōzu City, Ehime Prefecture 795-0000; Japan
- Coordinates: 33°36′56″N 132°29′12″E
- Operator: JR Shikoku
- Line: Yosan Line
- Distance: 233.1 km (144.8 mi) from Takamatsu
- Platforms: 1 side + 1 island platforms
- Tracks: 3

Construction
- Structure type: At grade

Other information
- Status: Unstaffed
- Station code: S12

History
- Opened: 14 February 1918; 108 years ago
- Former names: Nagahama-machi (until 1 October 1933)

Passengers
- FY2019: 328

Services
Preceding station	JR Shikoku	Following station
Iyo-Izushi S13 towards Uwajima	Yosan Line via Iyo-Nagahama	Kitanada S11 towards Takamatsu
Location
- Location within Ehime Prefecture Location within Japan

Iyo-Nagahama Station (伊予長浜駅, Iyo-Nagahama-eki) is a passenger railway station located in the city of Ōzu, Ehime Prefecture, Japan. It is operated by JR Shikoku and has the station number "S12".

== Lines ==
Iyo-Nagahama Station is located on the older, original, branch of the Yosan Line which runs along the coast from Mukaibara to Iyo-Ōzu and is 233.1 km from the beginning of the line at Takamatsu. Only local trains stop at the station. Eastbound local services end at Matsuyama. Connections with other services are needed to travel further east of Matsuyama on the line.

== Layout ==
The station consists of a side platform and an island platform serving three tracks with the centre one (track 2) being unused. The station building is unstaffed and serves only as a waiting room. Access to the island platform is by means of a level crossing with steps at both ends. A siding branches off track 1 and ends near the station building.

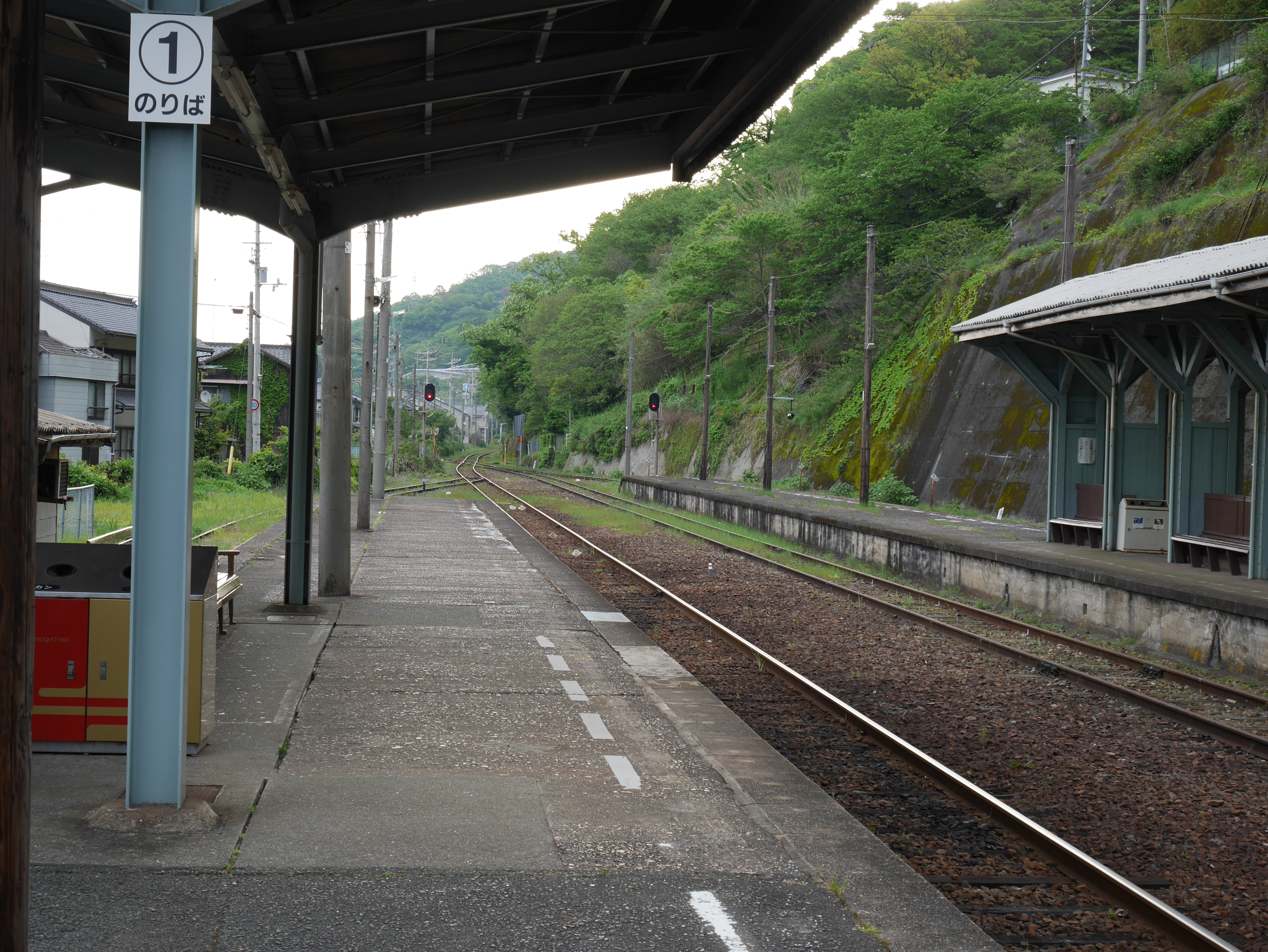
A view of the station platforms. The siding can be seen branching off to the left. To the right, grass can be seen growing over the unused track 2. Track 3 can be seen branching to the extreme right on the other side of the island platform.

== History ==
The station open as Nagahama-machi Station (長浜町駅, Nagahamamachi-eki) on 14 February 1918. At that time it was the eastern terminus of the privately run 762 mm gauge Ehime Railways. When the company was nationalized on 1 October 1933, Japanese Government Railways (JGR) assumed control. The station was renamed Iyo-Nagahama and was operated as part of the Ehime Line. The track was regauged to 1067 mm and linked up with the Yosan Mainline track from Kitanada on 6 October 1935. Iyo-Nagahama, which had also been moved 200m nearer to Kitanada at the same time, then became a through-station on the Yosan Mainline. With the privatization of JNR on 1 April 1987, the station came under the control of JR Shikoku.

== Surrounding area ==
- Ozu City Hall Nagahama Branch (former Nagahama Town Hall)
- Nagahama port
- Ehime Prefectural Nagahama High School

== See also ==
- List of railway stations in Japan
