= Iyo-Ōzu Station =

Railway station in Ōzu, Ehime Prefecture, Japan

S18 U14 Iyo-Ōzu Station 伊予大洲駅
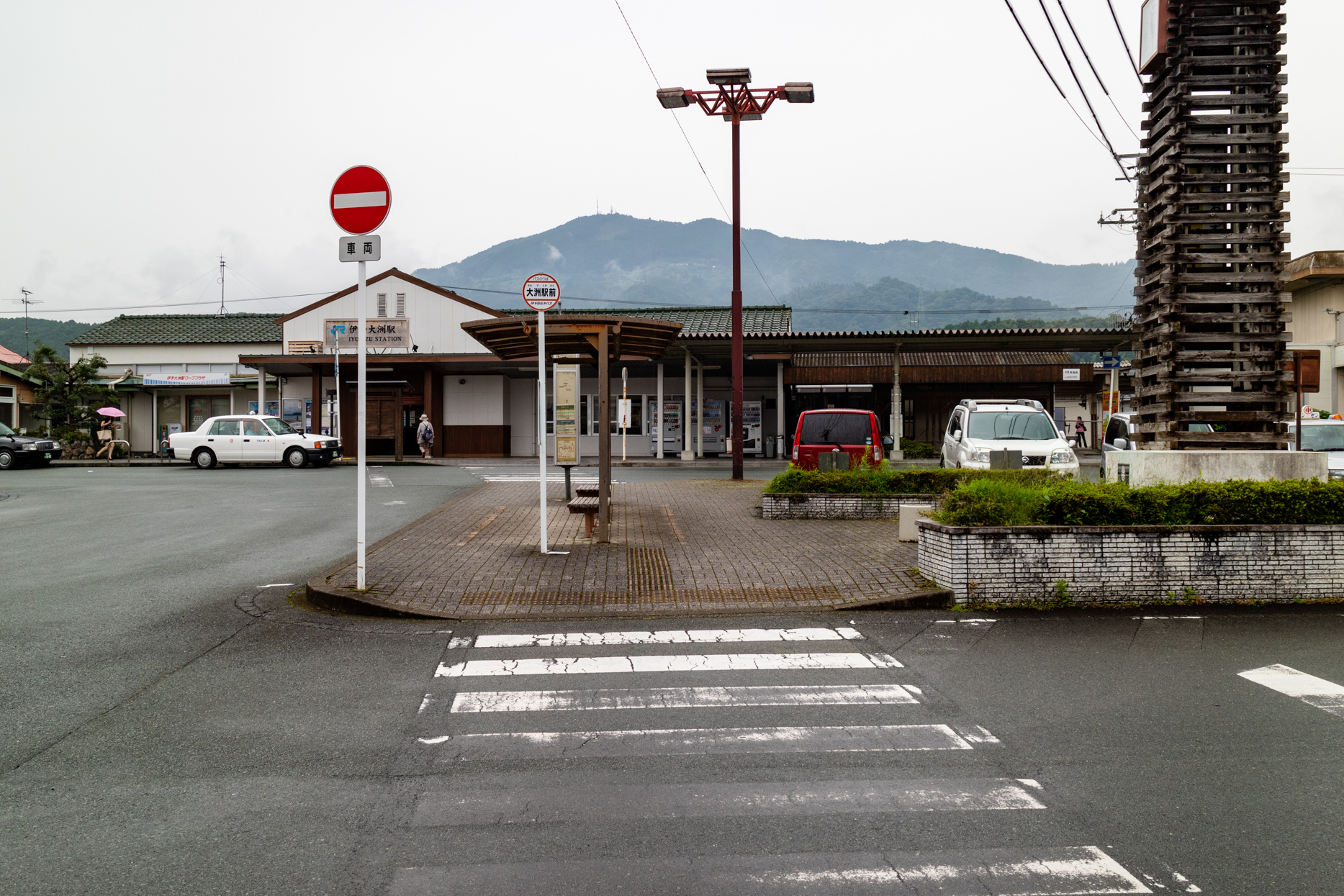
- Iyo-Ōzu Station in 2015

General information
- Location: 119 Nakamura, Ōzu City, Ehime Prefecture 795-0054; Japan
- Coordinates: 33°31′07″N 132°32′41″E
- Operator: JR Shikoku
- Line: Yosan Line
- Distance: 243.0 km (151.0 mi) from Takamatsu
- Platforms: 1 side + 1 island platforms
- Tracks: 3 + several passing loops and sidings

Construction
- Structure type: At grade
- Parking: Available
- Accessible: No - footbridge needed to access island platform

Other information
- Status: Staffed - JR ticket window (Midori no Madoguchi)
- Station code: U14, S18
- Website: Official website

History
- Opened: 14 February 1918; 108 years ago

Passengers
- FY2018: 1,914

Services
Preceding station	JR Shikoku	Following station
Nishi-Ōzu U15 towards Uwajima	Yosan Line	Niiya U13 towards Takamatsu
Nishi-Ōzu U15 towards Uwajima	Yosan Line via Iyo-Nagahama	Goro S17 towards Takamatsu
Location
- Location within Ehime Prefecture Location within Japan

Iyo-Ōzu Station (伊予大洲駅, Iyo-Ōzu-eki) is a junction passenger railway station located in the city of Ōzu, Ehime Prefecture, Japan. It is operated by JR Shikoku and is the junction of two branches of the Yosan Line and hence has two station numbers "U14" and "S18".

== Lines ==
Iyo-Ōzu Station is served by the JR Shikoku Yosan Line and is located 243.0 km from the beginning of the line at Takamatsu (measured along the shorter Uchiko branch. Iyo-Ōzu is the first station after the junction of two branches of the line, the older Iyonada branch along the coast and the newer, shorter inland Uchiko branch. As such it carries two station number prefixes, the "S" prefix for stations along the Iyonada branch and the "U" prefix used by stations along the Uchiko branch. Local trains serving both branches stop at the station. Eastbound local trains serving either branch terminate at Matsuyama. Connections with other services are needed to travel further east of Matsuyama on the line.

The Uwakai limited express train, which runs between Matsuyama and Uwajima, stops at this station.

== Layout ==
The station consists of an island platform and a side platform serving three tracks. Access to the island platform is by means of a footbridge. The station building houses a waiting room, a JR ticket window (with a Midori no Madoguchi facility) and a JR Travel Centre (Warp Plaza). Car parking is available at the station. Several sidings branch off the tracks, the one beyond track 3 leading to a disused freight platform.

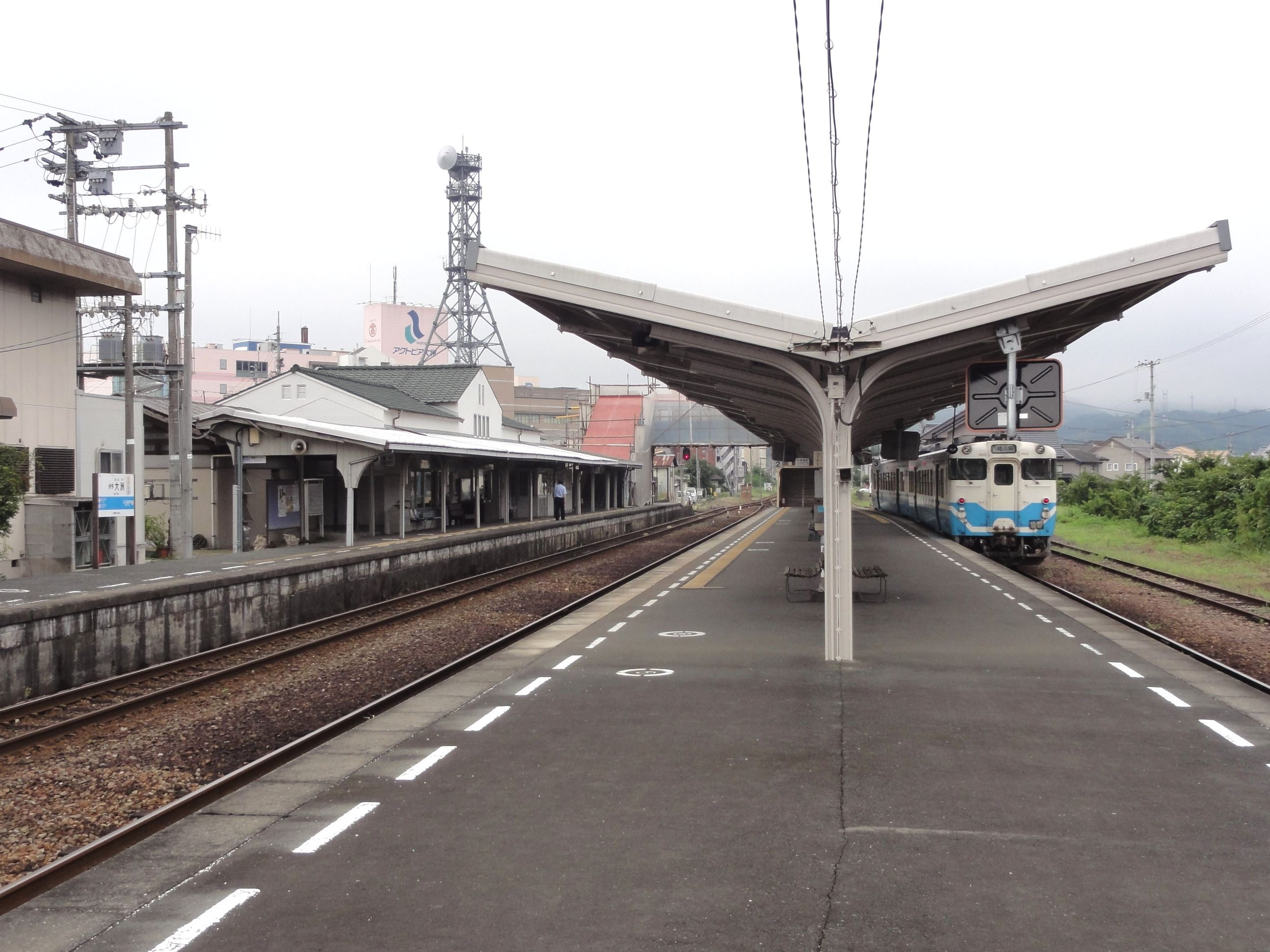
A view of the station platforms and tracks in 2011. A siding can be seen on the right,

== Adjacent stations ==
«	Service	»
JR Limited Express Services
Uchiko	Uwakai	Yawatahama
Yosan Line (Iyonada branch)
Gorō	Local	Nishi-Ōzu
Yosan Line (Uchiko branch)
Niiya	Local	Terminus

== History ==
The station was opened on 14 February 1918 as Ōzu, the terminus of the private Ehime Railway (愛媛鉄道, Ehime Tetsudō) a 762 mm (2 ft 6 in) light railway line starting from Wakamiya Junction (若宮連絡所, Wakamiya-renraku-sho), near Nagahama-machi (the present Iyo-Nagahama). After the company was nationalized on 1 October 1933, Japanese Government Railways (JGR) took over the station. It was renamed Iyo-Ōzu and now formed part of the Ehime Line (愛媛線, Ehime-sen). On October 6, 1935, after the track had been re-gauged to 1,067 mm, the station became part of the Yosan Main Line. With the privatization of JNR on 1 April 1987, control of the station passed to JR Shikoku.

== Surrounding area ==
- Iyo-Ozu Station Tourist Information Center
- Japan National Route 56

== See also ==
- List of railway stations in Japan
