= Kichijō-ji =

- 吉祥寺
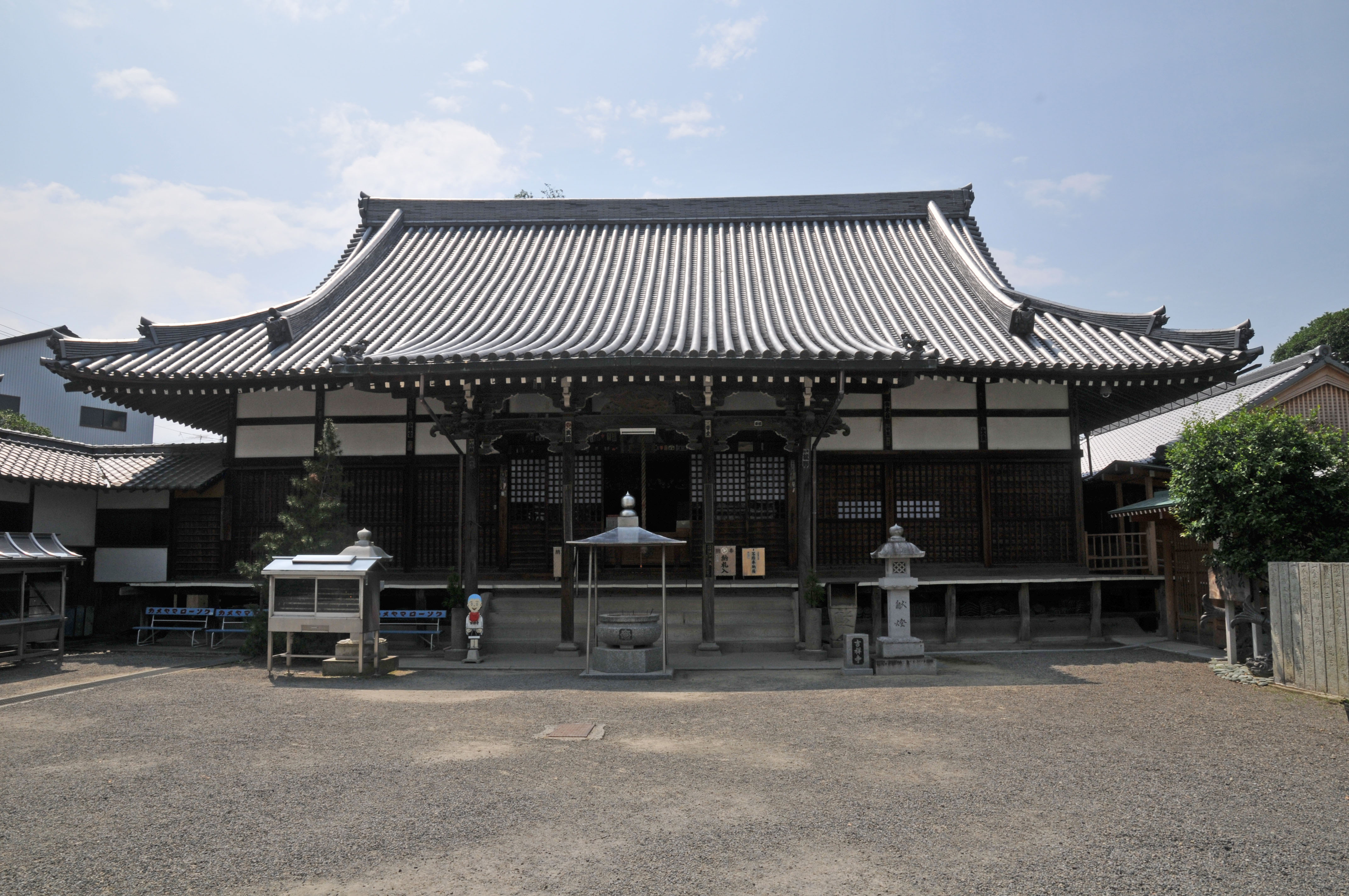

Religion
- Affiliation: Buddhism other_info =: Sect: [[{{{sect}}}]]

Location
- Country: Japan
- Interactive map of Kichijō-ji

Kichijō-ji (Japanese: 吉祥寺) is a temple belonging to the Toji School of Shingon Buddhism, located in Saijo City, Ehime Prefecture. Its formal mountain name is Mikkyozan, and its sub-temple name is Taizoin. The principal deity is Bishamonten (spelled "Bishamon-ten" at this temple). It serves as the 63rd pilgrimage site of the Shikoku Pilgrimage. It is the only temple among the 88 sites to enshrine Bishamonten as its principal deity.

- Mantra of the Principal Deity: Om beishira mandaya sowaka
- Pilgrimage Verse (Goeika): Cast aside the evil tidings harbored within your heart; pray, all of you, and hope for nothing but good fortune.
- Nokyo-in (Temple Seal): The Temple's Principal Deity (Shikoku 88-Temple Pilgrimage Site #63; Shikoku [Toyo] Seven Lucky Gods)

== History ==
According to temple legend, the temple's origins date back to the Kōnin era (810–823), when Kūkai (Kōbō-Daishi) carved and enshrined statues of Bishamonten, Kisshōten, and Zenbushidōji from a cypress tree that emitted a radiant light.

At that time, the temple was situated deep within the mountains in the valley of the Sakamoto River—located southeast of its current site (specifically, at an elevation of 368 meters, approximately 2 kilometers uphill to the southeast)—at a spot now known as "Kisshōji-yabu." The temple had grown to encompass as many as 21 tatchū (sub-temples); however, during Toyotomi Hideyoshi's conquest of Shikoku, when Kobayakawa Takakage attacked Takao Castle in the 13th year of the Tenshō era (1585), soldiers set fire to the temple—which was located in the same mountain range—and the entire complex was reduced to ashes. Although the principal image was rescued and relocated to the site of the Daishi-do (Great Master's Hall) at the foot of the mountain, the temple was reconstructed at its current location in Manji 2 (1659) following its merger with Kaiboku-dera, a sub-temple (tatchū) of the complex.

In Showa 51 (1976), the temple's head priest at the time spearheaded the establishment of the "Shikoku Toyo Seven Lucky Gods Pilgrimage" (Shikoku Toyo Shichifukujin Reijō), linking various pilgrimage sites in the surrounding area. This initiative was undertaken because the temples in the vicinity—where the Seven Lucky Gods are enshrined—had been objects of local devotion since the late Edo period. Additionally, special commemorative calligraphy sheets (nōkyō-shikishi) for the Shikoku Toyo Seven Lucky Gods Pilgrimage are available for purchase at this temple for 1,000 yen each.

Furthermore, while the deity corresponding to the Indian Vaiśravaṇa is typically written in Japan as "Bishamonten"—based on Chinese translations of Buddhist sutras (such as Amoghavajra's *Bishamonten-ō Kyō*)—this temple employs a unique orthography. Instead of the standard character for mon (meaning "gate" or "asking"), they utilize the character mon (meaning "hearing" or "listening")—derived from the alternative name Tamonten—to write the deity's name as "Bishamon-ten."

== Temple Grounds ==
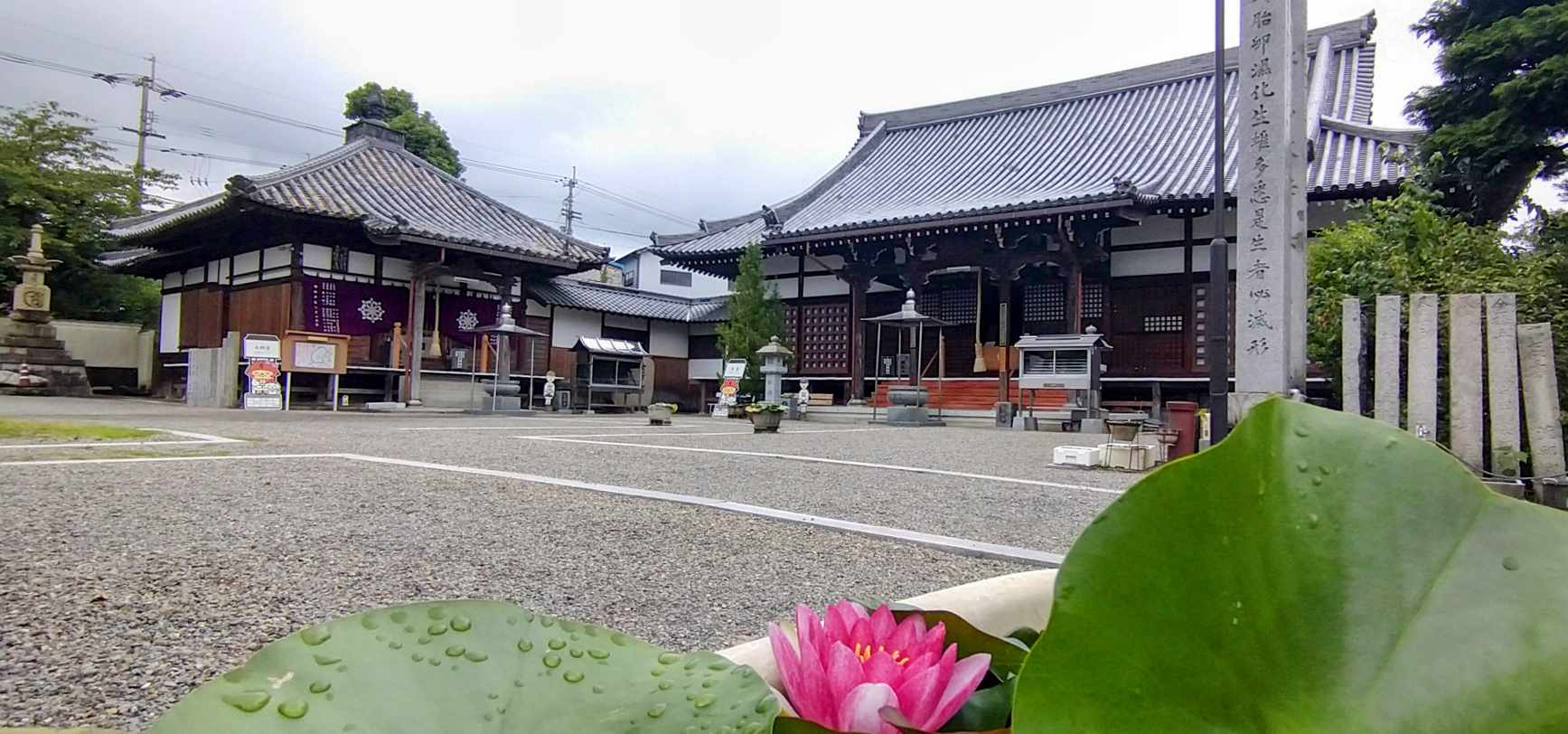
Daishido (left) and Main Hall

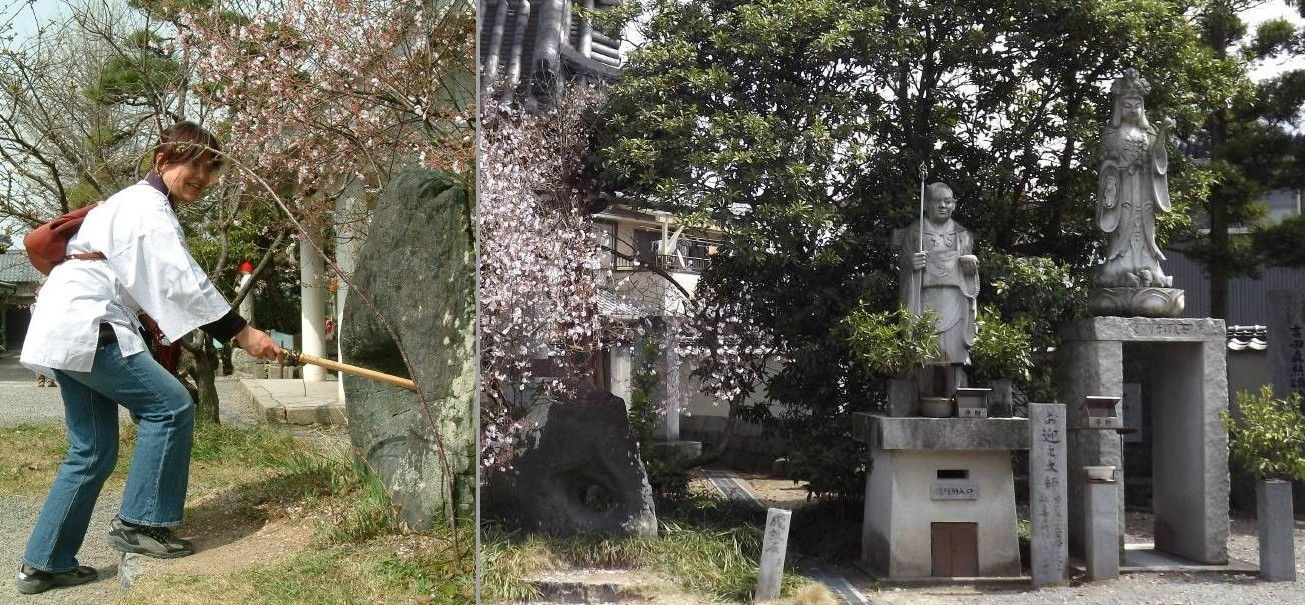
Joju-ishi (left), Kuguri-Kichijotennyo (right)

- Sanmon (Main Gate)
- Hondo (Main Hall): The principal image—a seated statue of Bishamonten—is a *hibutsu* (secret Buddha) unveiled to the public only once every 60 years; the next scheduled unveiling is in the year 2038. Extensive renovation work on the Main Hall was carried out over the course of approximately one year, beginning in 2022.
- Daishido (Founder's Hall)

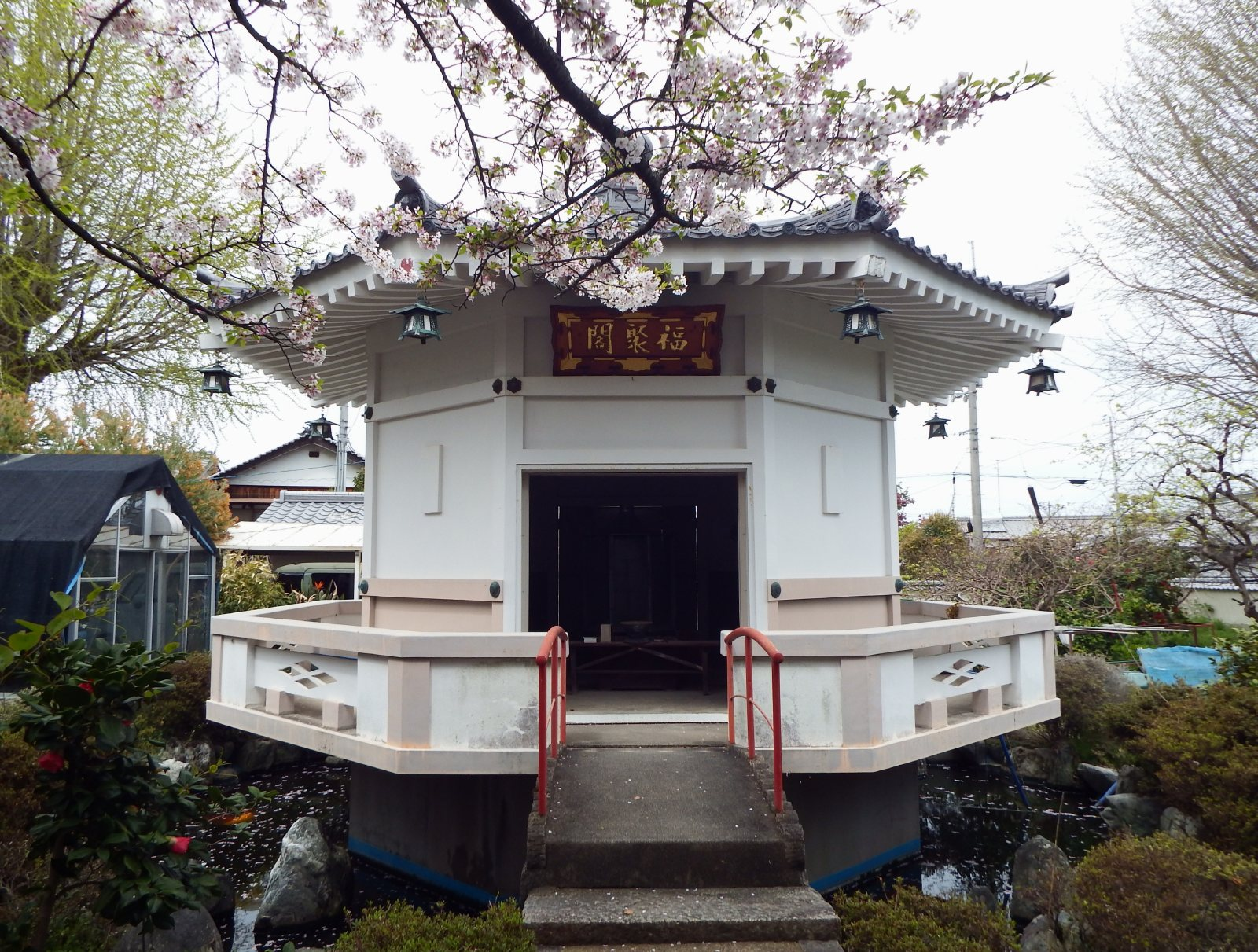
Kichijoji: Fukujukaku

- Fukujukaku: Enshrines six of the Seven Lucky Gods (Shichifukujin), excluding Bishamonten, who serves as the temple's principal image.
- Shoro (Bell Tower)
- Kuri (Temple Kitchen/Living Quarters)
- Kuguri-Kichijotennyo: It is said that passing beneath this statue removes all forms of poverty and bestows wealth, prosperity, and treasure upon the devotee.
- Joju-ishi (Wish-Granting Stone): Legend has it that if you close your eyes, grasp a *kongo-zue* (pilgrim's staff), walk from the vicinity of the Main Hall to the location of the stone, and successfully thrust the staff through the hole in the stone (approx. 30 cm in diameter), your wish will be granted.
- Haiku Monuments: A monument inscribed with Matsuo Basho's haiku, "Furu ike ya / kawazu tobikomu / mizu no oto" (An ancient pond / a frog jumps in / the sound of water), is located behind the Joju-ishi; to its right stands a monument inscribed with a haiku by Shinsho Yoshida: "Arigataya / Miato shitoute / nijugo-sai" (How grateful I am / to revere the Master's traces / at the age of twenty-five).

Upon entering the Sanmon (Main Gate), the Bell Tower and Temizuya (purification pavilion) are located to the left. Proceeding slightly further, the Kuri and Nokyosho (sutra-stamping office) are found to the right, the Main Hall to the left, and the Daishido immediately to the left of the Main Hall.

- Shukubo (Pilgrim Lodging): None available.
- Parking: None on-site. Private parking lots are available in the vicinity (Standard cars: 300 yen per hour).

== Temple Treasures ==
- Maria Kannon Statue – A statue made of pure white Goryeo ware, standing approximately 30 cm tall. It is said to have been entrusted to the temple by a Spanish ship captain whom Chosokabe Motochika had rescued.
- Black-Lacquered Onna-norimono (Lady's Palanquin) with Gold and Silver Maki-e Plum and Arabesque Designs – An onna-norimono (a palanquin reserved for high-ranking women) dating from the Edo period, used by Teruko (known as Junshō-in)—the daughter of Akizuki Tanenori, Lord of the Takanabe Domain—when she entered into marriage with Ichiyanagi Yorichika, Lord of the Komatsu Domain. It was made available for public viewing on January 3, 2015.

== Access ==
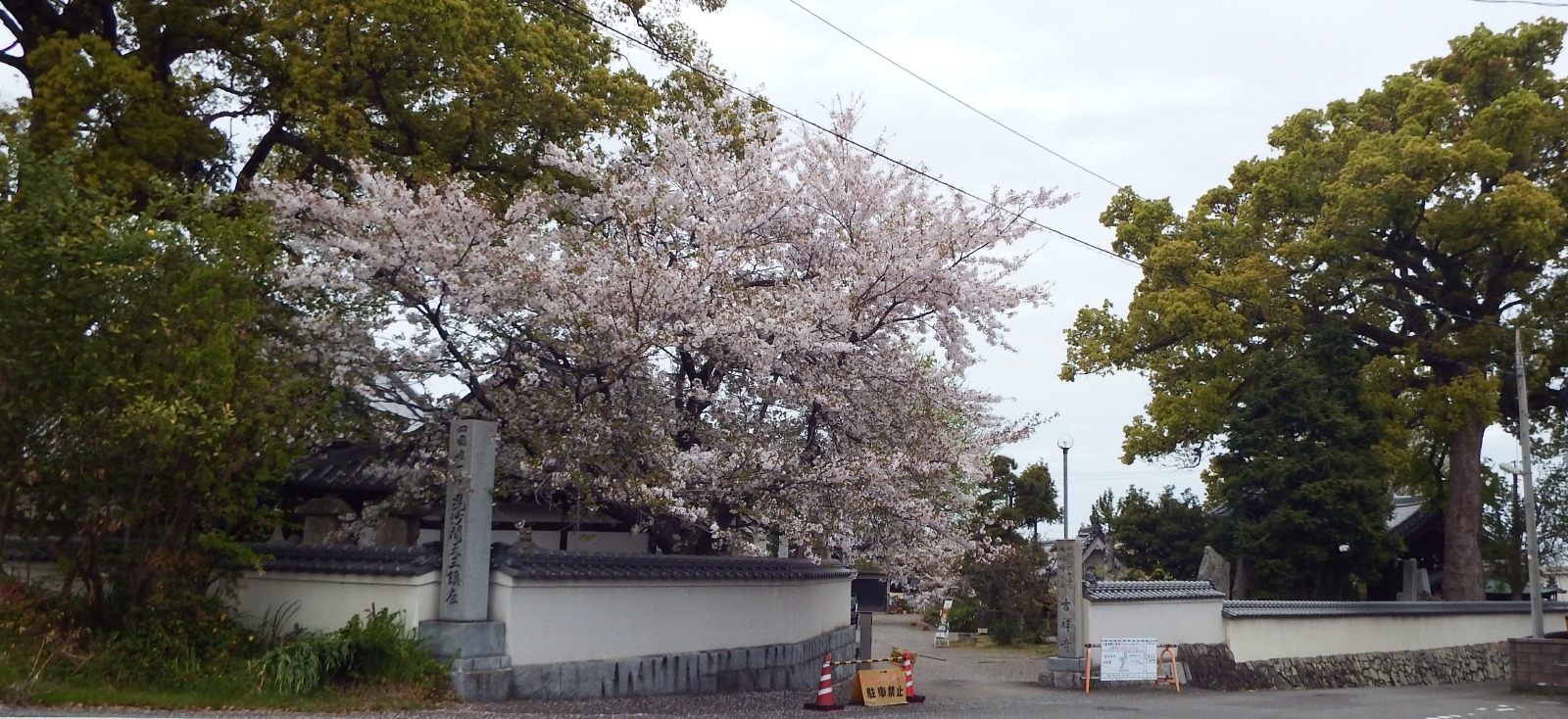
Exterior

=== Rail ===
- Shikoku Railway Company (JR Shikoku) Yosan Line — Alight at Iyo-Himi Station (0.2 km)

=== Bus ===
- Setouchi Bus (bound for Niihama, etc.) — Alight at "Himi" stop (0.1 km)

=== Road ===
- General Road: National Route 11 (Asahi-machi) (0.1 km)
- Expressway: Matsuyama Expressway — Iyo-Komatsu Interchange (6.2 km)

== Inner Sanctuary ==
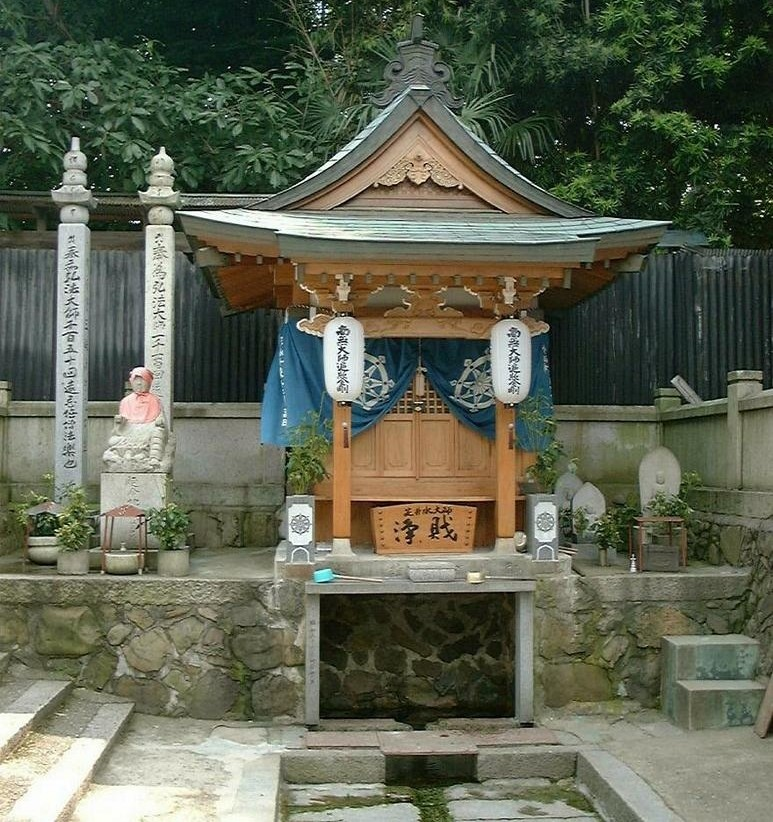
Shibai-no-i

Shibai-no-i (Consecrated Water)
This is traditionally believed to be the consecrated water of Kūkai (Kōbō-Daishi).
- Location: Himi-shinmachi, Saijo City, Ehime Prefecture (33°53′37.4″N 133°07′41.4″E)

== Neighboring Temples ==
=== Shikoku 88-Temple Pilgrimage ===
62 Hōju-ji --(1.4 km)-- 63 Kichijō-ji --(3.2 km)-- 64 Maegami-ji
*Note: There are multiple routes for the pilgrimage path; the distances listed above are based on the standard route.

== See Also ==
- Shikoku Pilgrimage

== Bibliography ==
- Shikoku 88-temple Pilgrimage Council, ed. (2006). Pilgrim Guide's Canon. Shikoku 88-temple Pilgrimage Council.
- Tateki Miyazaki (2007). Shikoku Pilgrimage: Walking Alone, Yet Accompanied by Two. Vol. Map Edition (8th ed.). Henromichi Preservation Cooperation Association.
