= Tamanoe Station =

Railway station in Saijō, Ehime Prefecture, Japan

Y35 Tamanoe Station 玉之江駅
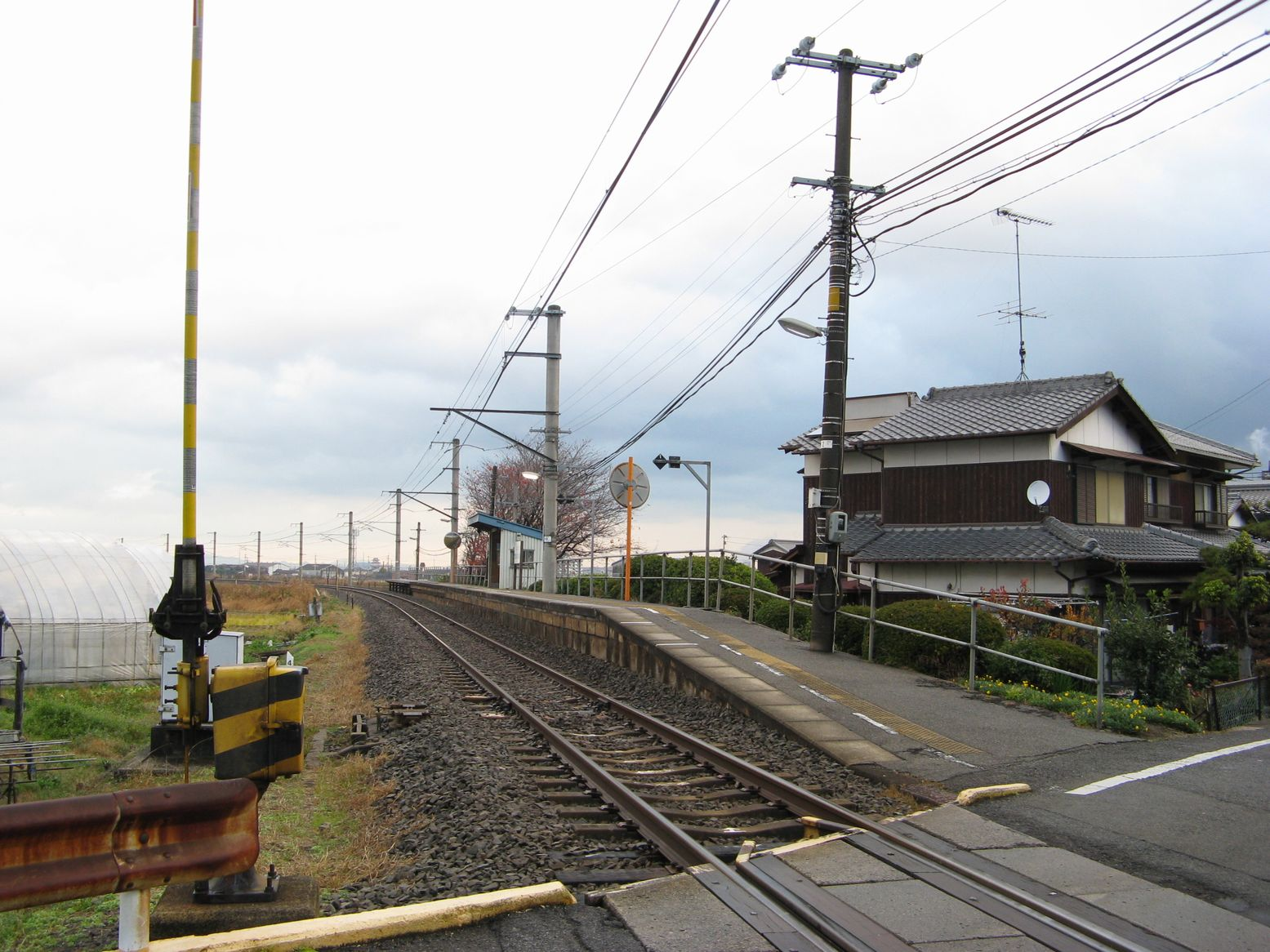
- Tamanoe Station in 2008

General information
- Location: Ishida, Saijō-shi, Ehime-ken 799-1364; Japan
- Coordinates: 33°54′46″N 133°05′57″E
- Operator: JR Shikoku
- Line: ■ Yosan Line
- Distance: 124.5 km from Takamatsu
- Platforms: 1 side platform
- Tracks: 1

Construction
- Structure type: At grade
- Accessible: Yes - ramp to platform

Other information
- Status: Unstaffed
- Station code: Y35

History
- Opened: 1 February 1963; 63 years ago

Passengers
- FY2019: 102
Location
- Location within Ehime Prefecture Location within Japan

Tamanoe Station (玉之江駅, Tamanoe-eki) is a passenger railway station located in the city of Saijō, Ehime Prefecture, Japan. It is operated by JR Shikoku and has the station number "Y35".

== Lines ==
Tamanoe Station is served by the JR Shikoku Yosan Line and is located 124.5 km from the beginning of the line at Takamatsu Station. Only Yosan Line local trains stop at the station and they only serve the sector between Iyo-Saijō and Matsuyama. Connections with other local or limited express trains are needed to travel further east or west along the line.

== Layout ==
The station consists of a side platform serving a single track. There is no station building, only a shelter for waiting passengers. A ramp leads up to the platform from the access road.

== Adjacent stations ==
«	Service	»
Yosan Line
Iyo-Komatsu	Local	Nyūgawa

== History ==
Japanese National Railways (JNR) opened Tamanoe Station on 1 February 1963 as a new station on the existing Yosan Line. With the privatization of JNR on 1 April 1987, control of the station passed to JR Shikoku.

== Surrounding area ==
- Saijo Municipal Yoshii Elementary School
- Japan National Route 196

== See also ==
- List of railway stations in Japan
