= Iyo-Komatsu Station =

Railway station in Saijō, Japan

Y34 Iyo-Komatsu Station 伊予小松駅
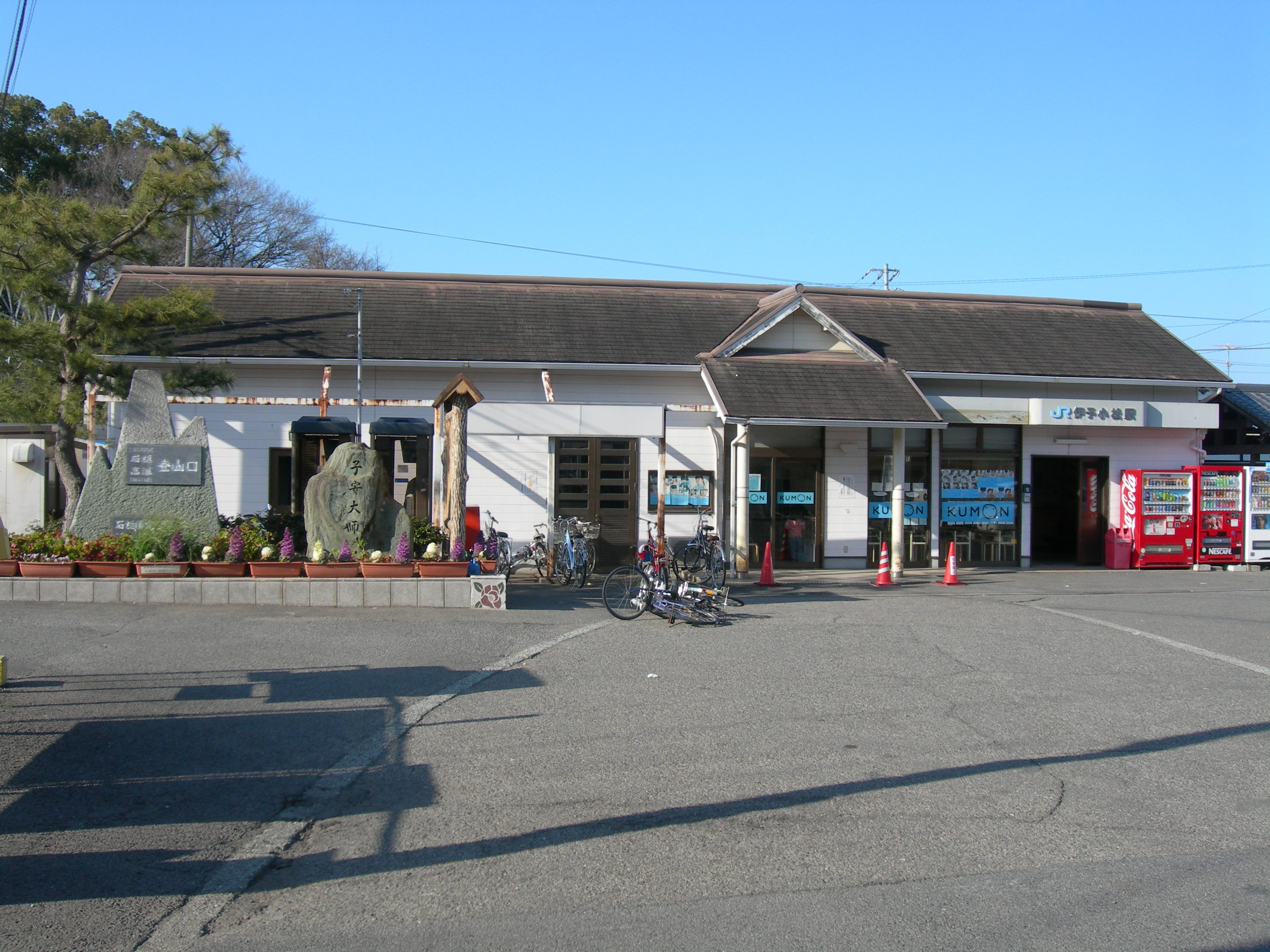
- Iyo-Komatsu Station in 2008

General information
- Location: Komatsucho Shinyashiki, Saijō-shi, Ehime-ken 799-1101; Japan
- Coordinates: 33°53′51″N 133°07′00″E
- Operator: JR Shikoku
- Line: ■ Yosan Line
- Distance: 121.6 km from Takamatsu
- Platforms: 2 side platforms
- Tracks: 2 + sidings

Construction
- Structure type: At grade
- Parking: Available
- Accessible: No - platforms linked by footbridge

Other information
- Status: Unstaffed
- Station code: Y34

History
- Opened: 1 May 1923; 103 years ago
- Rebuilt: ,

Passengers
- FY2019: 530
Location
- Location within Ehime Prefecture Location within Japan

Iyo-Komatsu Station (伊予小松駅, Iyo-Komatsu-eki) is a passenger railway station located in the city of Saijō, Ehime Prefecture, Japan. It is operated by JR Shikoku and has the station number "Y34".

== Lines ==
Iyo-Komatsu Station is served by the JR Shikoku Yosan Line and is located 121.6 km from the beginning of the line at Takamatsu Station. Only Yosan Line local trains stop at the station and they only serve the sector between Iyo-Saijō and Matsuyama. Connections with other local or limited express trains are needed to travel further east or west along the line.

== Layout ==
The station consists of two opposed side platforms serving two tracks. Track 1 is a passing loop and served by platform 1, attached to the station building. Track 2, served by platform 2, is a straight track. Access to platform 2 is by means of a footbridge. The station building is unstaffed and serves only as a waiting room. Parking is available at the station forecourt. There is also a refuge siding branching off track 1 which ends near the station building. Short stub sidings branch off elsewhere on both tracks.

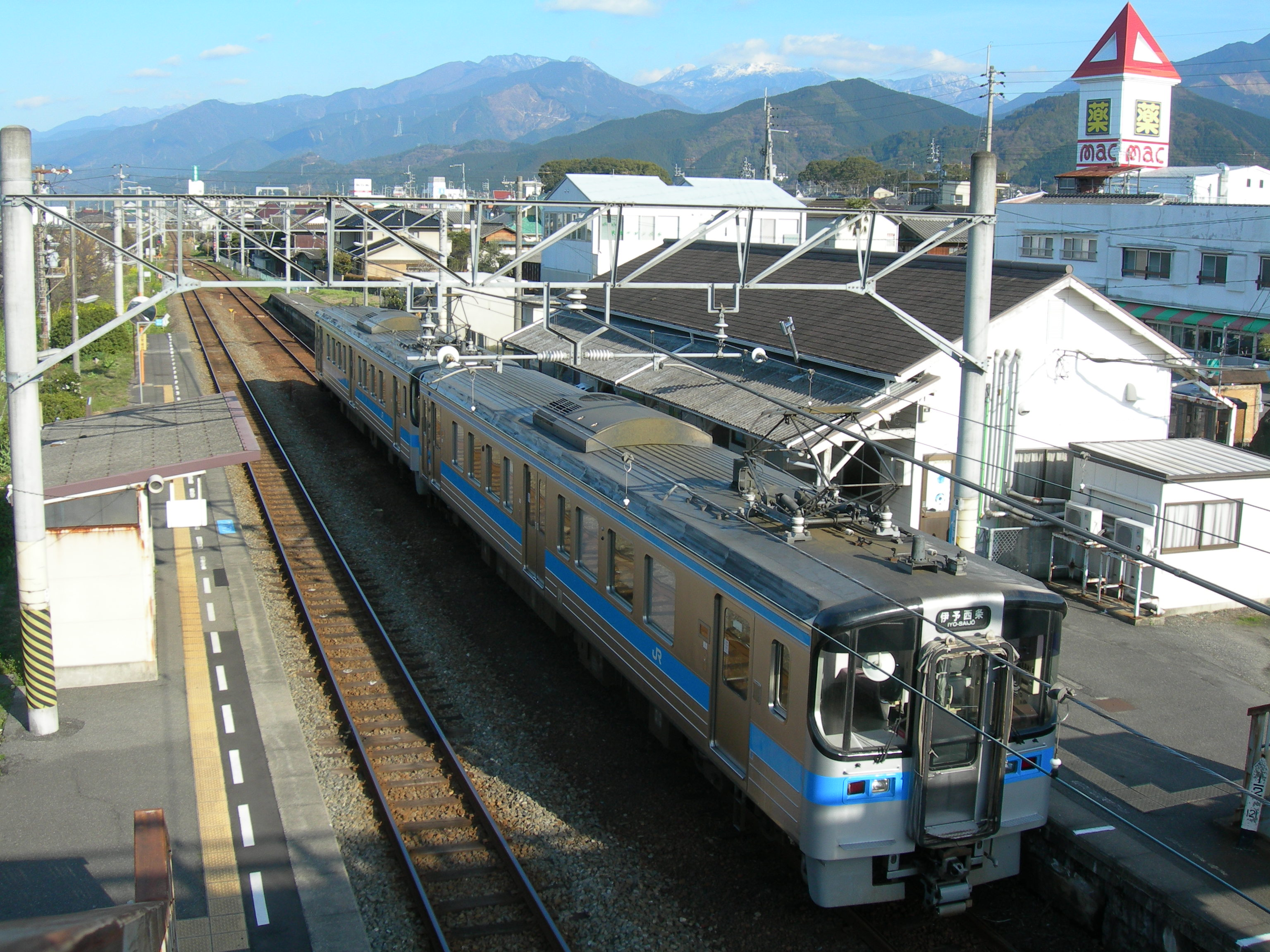
A view of the station platforms in 2008.

== Adjacent stations ==
«	Service	»
Yosan Line
Iyo-Himi	Local	Tamanoe

== History ==
The station opened on 1 May 1923 as an intermediate stop when the then Sanuki Line was extended westwards from Iyo-Saijō to Nyūgawa. At that time the station was operated by Japanese Government Railways, later becoming Japanese National Railways (JNR). With the privatization of JNR on 1 April 1987, control of the station passed to JR Shikoku.

== Surrounding area ==
- Kōon-ji, 61st temple of the Shikoku Pilgrimage
- Hōju-ji, 62nd temple of the Shikoku Pilgrimage
- Saijo City Hall Komatsu General Branch
- Saijo Municipal Komatsu Elementary School
- Ehime Prefectural Komatsu High School

== See also ==
- List of railway stations in Japan
