= Ishizuchiyama Station =

Railway station in Saijo, Ehime prefecture, Japan

Y32 Ishizuchiyama Station 石鎚山駅
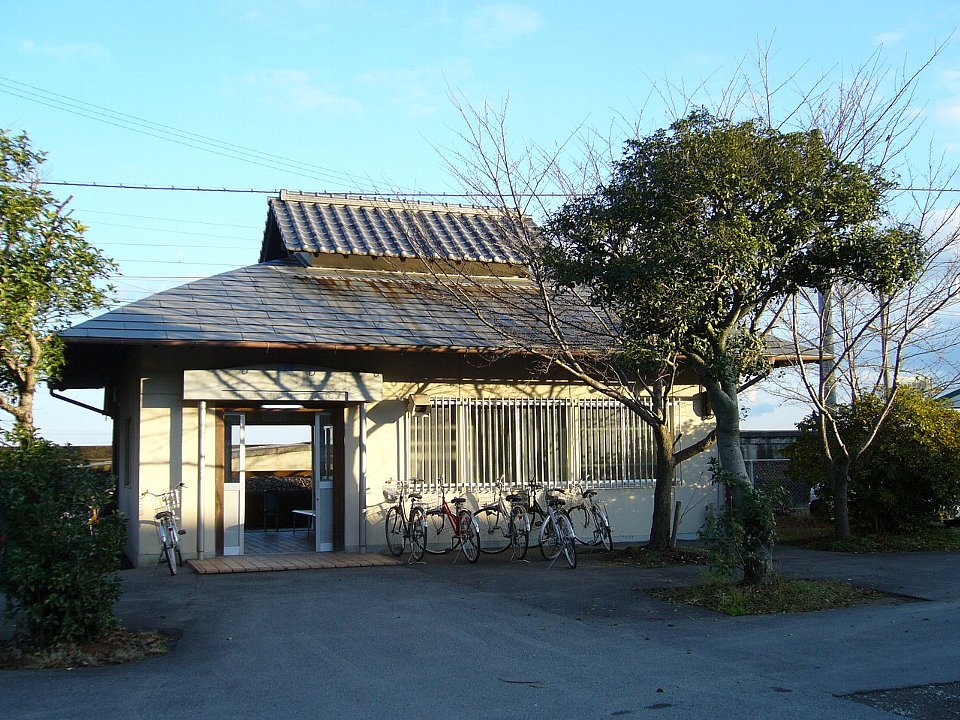
- Ishizuchiyama Station in 2006

General information
- Location: Nishidashinkai, Saijō-shi, Ehime-ken 793-0000; Japan
- Coordinates: 33°53′46″N 133°09′29″E
- Operator: JR Shikoku
- Line: ■ Yosan Line
- Distance: 117.8 km from Takamatsu
- Platforms: 1 island platform
- Tracks: 2

Construction
- Structure type: At grade
- Accessible: No - steps from waiting room to level crossing to access platform

Other information
- Status: Unstaffed
- Station code: Y32

History
- Opened: 2 July 1929; 97 years ago

Passengers
- FY2019: 90
Location
- Location within Ehime Prefecture Location within Japan

Ishizuchiyama Station (石鎚山駅, Ishizuchiyama-eki) is a passenger railway station located in the city of Saijō, Ehime Prefecture, Japan. It is operated by JR Shikoku and has the station number "Y32".

== Lines ==
Ishizuchiyama Station is served by the JR Shikoku Yosan Line and is located 117.8 km from the beginning of the line at Takamatsu Station. Only Yosan Line local trains stop at the station and they only serve the sector between Iyo-Saijō and Matsuyama. Connections with other local or limited express trains are needed to travel further east or west along the line.

== Layout ==
The station consists of an island platform serving two tracks. The station building is unstaffed and serves as a waiting room. As it is located at a lower level than the track bed, a short flight of steps is needed to reach the level crossing which connects to the platform.

== Adjacent stations ==
«	Service	»
Yosan Line
Iyo-Saijō	Local	Iyo-Himi

== History ==
Ishizuchiyama Station opened on 2 July 1929 as a temporary stop on the then Sanyo Line (讃予線). On 21 March 1933, it was upgraded to a permanent station. At that time the station was operated by Japanese Government Railways, later becoming Japanese National Railways (JNR). With the privatization of JNR on 1 April 1987, control of the station passed to JR Shikoku.

== Surrounding area ==
The area around the station is a rural area, and there are not many private houses. It is the nearest station to Ishizuchi Shrine, but access to the shrine is not maintained.

- Ishizuchi Shrine
- Maegami-ji, 64th temple of the Shikoku Pilgrimage

== See also ==
- List of railway stations in Japan
