= Hōju-ji =

- 宝寿寺
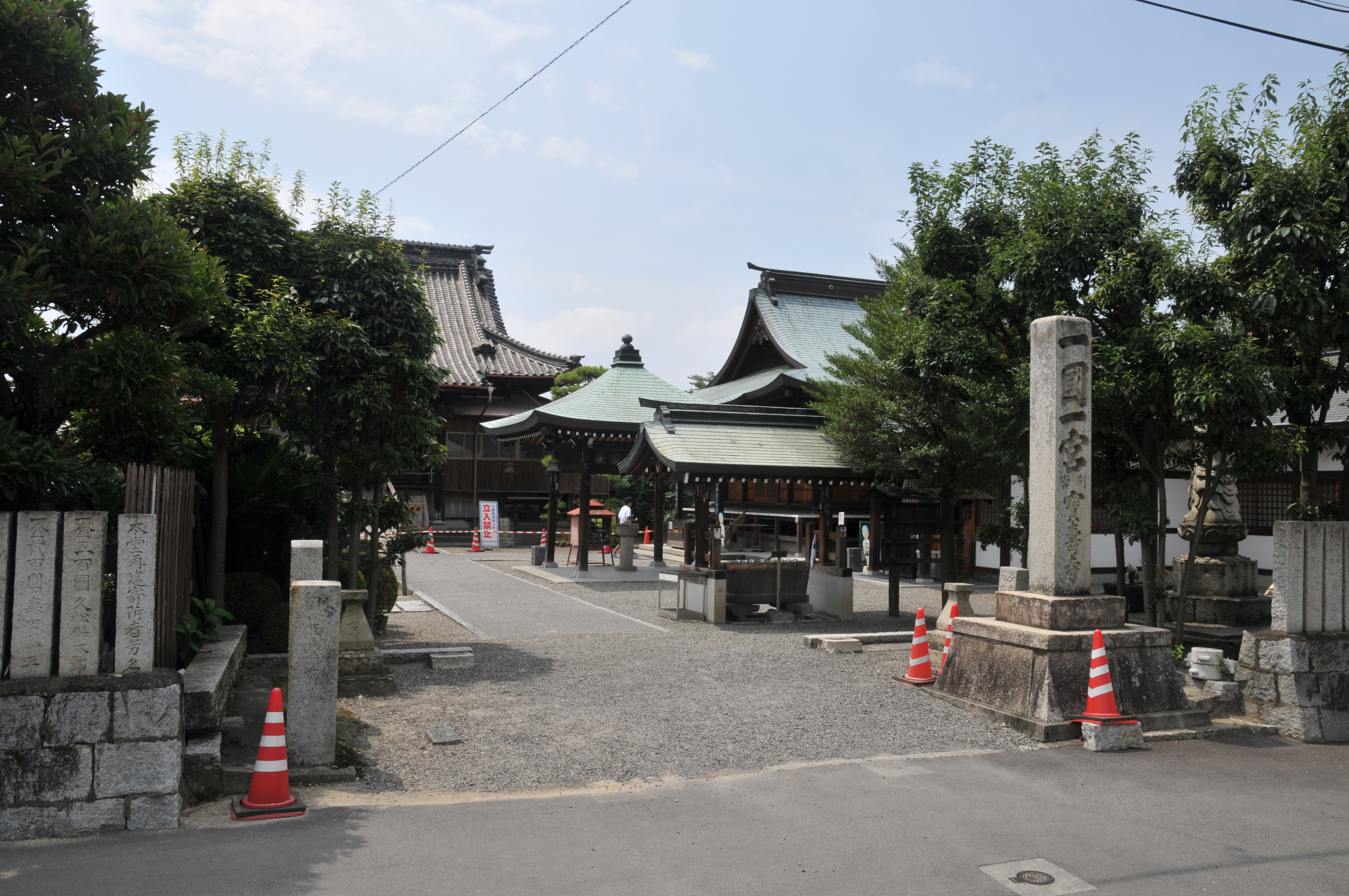

Religion
- Affiliation: Buddhism other_info =: Sect: [[{{{sect}}}]]

Location
- Country: Japan
- Interactive map of Hōju-ji

Hōju-ji (Japanese: 宝寿寺) is a Buddhist temple belonging to the Shingon-shu Zentsuji School, located in Komatsu-cho, Saijo City, Ehime Prefecture (having previously belonged to the Koyasan Shingon School and subsequently operated as an independent temple). Its formal mountain name is Tenyozan, and its sub-temple name is Kan'onin. The principal image is the Eleven-faced Kannon Bodhisattva (Juichimen Kannon). It serves as Temple No. 62 on the Shikoku Pilgrimage. Additionally, Ichinomiya Shrine—the site of the original pilgrimage stop—is also described here.

- Principal Image Mantra: Om maka kyaronikya sowaka
- Pilgrimage Verse (Goeika): Samidare no ato ni idetaru Tama no I wa / Shirotsubo naru ya Ichinomiya ka wa
- Pilgrimage Seals (Nokyo-in): The Temple's Principal Image; Shikoku (Toyo) Seven Lucky Gods—Hoteison

== Origins and History ==
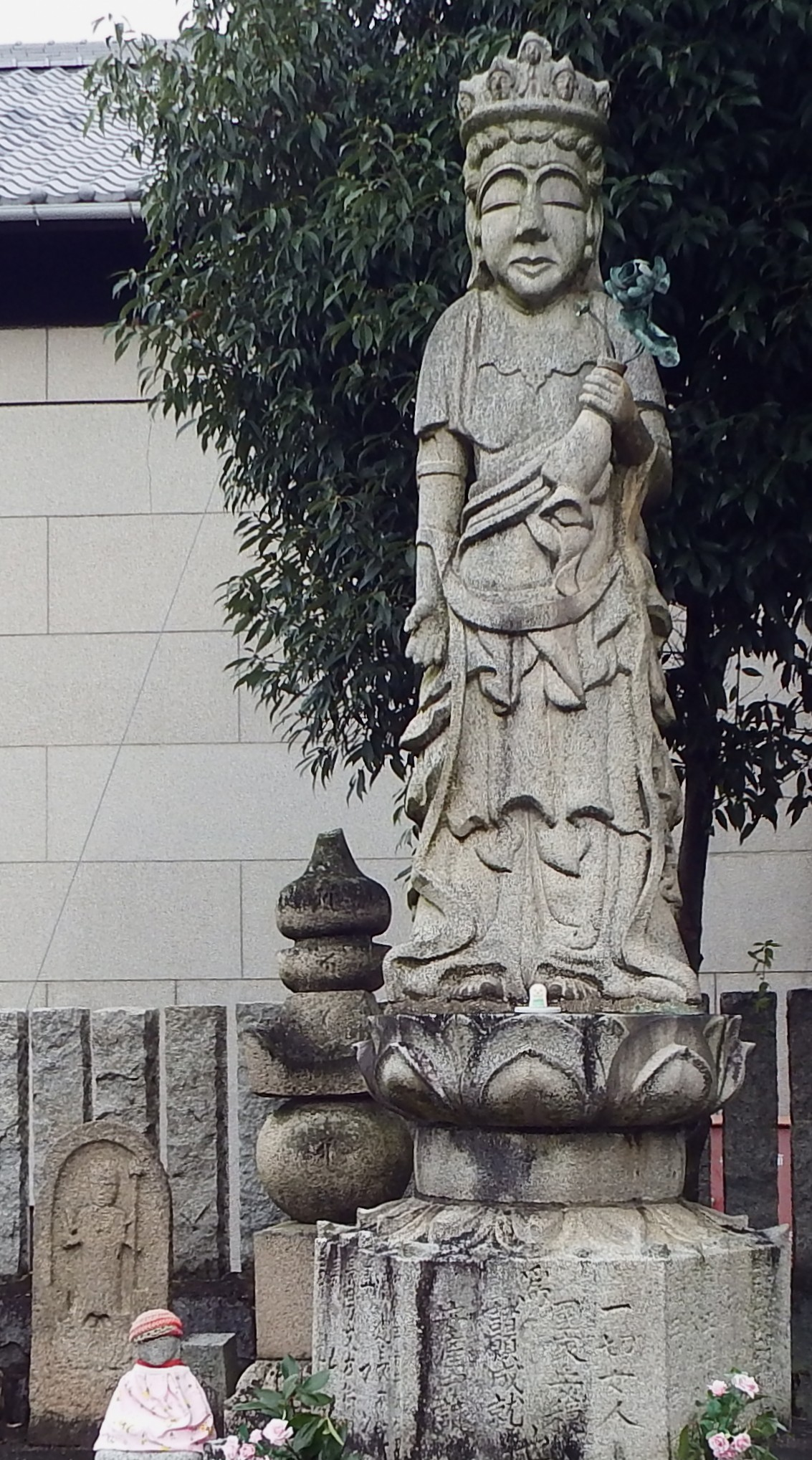
Stone Statue of Kannon Bodhisattva

According to tradition, acting upon an Imperial Vow issued by Emperor Shōmu during the Tenpyō era (729–748), and guided by a divine oracle from Ōkuninushi-no-Ōkami, three deities—including Ōkuninushi-no-Ōkami himself—were enshrined in the village of Shirotsubo (an area situated approximately one kilometer north of the current site, near the northern bank of the Nakayama River). At that time, Dōji established a temple adjacent to this shrine to serve as a place for Buddhist rites and offerings (hōraku-sho), naming it Kongō-hōji.

During the Daidō era (806–810), Kūkai (Kōbō-Daishi) stayed at the site; he carved a statue of the Eleven-faced Kannon Bodhisattva—modeled after Empress Kōmyō—to serve as the temple's principal image (*honzon*), and subsequently renamed the temple **Hōju-ji**. Around this same period, the wife of the Ochi clan head—who served as the provincial governor (kokushi) at the time—experienced a difficult labor and requested that Kūkai offer prayers on her behalf. Kūkai blessed the water from the *Tamanoi* ("Jewel Well") located within the temple precincts (which no longer exists) and presented it to Lady Ochi. Upon drinking it, she safely gave birth to a beautiful, jewel-like baby boy. Overjoyed by this miracle, she composed and dedicated two poems to the temple; one of these poems survives to this day as the temple's traditional *goeika* (pilgrimage hymn). In commemoration of this event, the temple's principal deity came to be revered as the Kannon of Safe Childbirth.

The temple frequently suffered damage from the flooding of the Nakayama River. Consequently, when the temple buildings were reconstructed in 1145 (Ten'yō 2), the temple's mountain name (*sangō*) was officially changed to "Ten'yō-zan."

In 1585 (Tenshō 13), the temple was devastated during the Shikoku Campaign led by Hashiba Hideyoshi (later Toyotomi Hideyoshi). In 1636 (Kan'ei 13), the temple alone was relocated by the priest Yūden Shōnin to its current site in the Shin'yashiki district and subsequently restored. As a result, pilgrims thereafter began depositing their votive slips at the shrine in Shiratsubo before proceeding to this temple to perform their *nōkyō* (sutra dedication). During this relocation, a statue of Hotei—which had been donated by lay believers as a deity of safe childbirth, much like the temple's principal deity—was enshrined alongside the main image in the Main Hall. This Hotei statue now serves as the principal deity for the Shikoku (Tōyo) Seven Lucky Gods Pilgrimage Circuit. Later, in 1679 (Enpō 7), acting on the orders of the local feudal lord, the shrine itself was relocated to a site adjacent to the temple in order to protect it from future flooding. According to surviving *nōkyōchō* (sutra dedication ledgers) from the period following this relocation, the entries recording the dedication of sutras were inscribed not under the name of the temple's principal deity, but rather as "Iyo-no-kuni Ichinomiya Daimyōjin: Bettō Hōju-ji" (The Chief Administrator Temple, Hōju-ji, of the Foremost Shrine of Iyo Province). During the early Meiji period, amidst the anti-Buddhist movement known as *Haibutsu-kishaku*, this temple was separated from its associated shrine and subsequently dissolved. However, in 1877 (Meiji 10), it was relocated to a site immediately south of the shrine and re-established by the Venerable Oishi Ryūhen. Later, in 1921 (Taishō 10), due to construction work on the Yosan Line railway, it was moved once again to its current location further to the south.

== Withdrawal from and Rejoining the Pilgrimage Association ==
In March 2015, the "Shikoku 88-Temple Pilgrimage Association" (hereinafter referred to as the "Association")—an organization comprising the temples (known as *fudasho*) that constitute the Shikoku 88-Temple Pilgrimage—filed a civil lawsuit against the head priest of Hoju-ji Temple, demanding that he comply with the Association's operational guidelines and pay his outstanding membership dues. (Note: "Pilgrimage Association vs. Temple No. 62: Litigation Arises over Pilgrimage Rules". Yomiuri Shimbun. 2016-07-20.) In the complaint, the Shikoku Sacred Sites Association alleged that Hoju-ji Temple had obstructed the pilgrimage by, among other things, directing verbal abuse at visitors; Hoju-ji, conversely, argued that no such obstruction had taken place and that, having withdrawn from the Association, it was under no obligation to comply with its operational guidelines. On March 22, 2017, at the Marugame Branch of the Takamatsu District Court, the Reijōkai's claims were dismissed, resulting in a ruling that affirmed Hōju-ji Temple's withdrawal from the Reijōkai. On March 30 of the same year, the Pilgrimage Association decided not to appeal the ruling, thereby rendering the judgment final.

For a period following the finalization of the judgment, the hours for receiving Nōkyō (pilgrimage stamp/calligraphy services) were set from 8:00 AM to 12:00 PM and 1:00 PM to 5:00 PM; furthermore, pilgrims were required to pay a fee covering both the standard Nōkyō service and the cost of a black-and-white Mikage (pilgrim card)—priced at 200 yen per card. However, effective June 1, 2018, the Nōkyō hours were extended to run continuously from 8:00 AM to 5:00 PM (with no midday break). Additionally, the black-and-white Mikage cards were once again distributed free of charge, consistent with past practice, provided that the pilgrim had their Nōkyō book or Nōkyō scroll stamped.

It should be noted, however, that the color *Mikage* cards offered were not those issued by the Pilgrimage Association; rather, they were original color cards produced by Hōju-ji Temple itself—created by tinting the traditional black-and-white design with yellow—and were sold for 200 yen per card. The standard Nōkyō fees were set at 600 yen for a Nōkyō book, 800 yen for a hanging scroll, and 300 yen for a pilgrim's white robe (Byakue). Conversely, for visitors who did not wish to receive the Nōkyō service, an admission fee (or a parking fee for those traveling by car) of 300 yen was collected instead. Furthermore, regarding the 62nd sacred site—which had become vacant following Hoju-ji Temple's withdrawal—the Sacred Sites Association established a *Nokyosho* (sutra-recording office) designated as the "62nd Worship Site" within the parking lot of the 61st sacred site, Koen-ji Temple. This measure was implemented to prevent pilgrims from being refused the recording of sutra recitations or the issuance of shuin (vermilion seals).

Effective December 1, 2019, Shido-ji Temple (of the Shingon-shu Zentsu-ji School)—the 86th sacred site—assumed full operational control of Hoju-ji Temple as a provisional measure for the time being (with the head priest of Shido-ji Temple concurrently serving as the head priest of Hoju-ji Temple). Consequently, Hoju-ji Temple formally rejoined the Sacred Sites Association. Consequently, the Pilgrimage Association closed the "No. 62 Worship Site" effective December 15 of the same year. As a result of its re-admission to the Association, the temple's visiting hours and Nōkyō (sutra transcription) fees were standardized to match those of other pilgrimage sites, and parking became free of charge.

== Temple Grounds ==
- Main Hall (Hondo) — Front of the Inner Sanctuary: The Principal Image: A Standing Statue of the Eleven-Faced Kannon (total height approx. 2 *shaku*; crystal-inlaid eyes). This is a Hibutsu (Secret Buddha) that is rarely displayed to the public; however, it was specially unveiled from January 2018 through December 1, 2019. *In front of the Principal Image:* A Standing Statue of the Eleven-Faced Kannon (a public-facing substitute image) and a Standing Statue of Jizo Bodhisattva. *Left side of the Inner Sanctuary:* Attendant Deity—Standing Statue of the Thousand-Armed Kannon; Standing Statue of Hotei (one of the Seven Lucky Gods of Shikoku/Toyo region); and others. *Right side of the Inner Sanctuary:* Attendant Deity—Standing Statue of Fudo Myoo (although it once sat in the central position for a long period, it has since been returned to its original location).
- Daishido (Founder's Hall): Seated Statue of the Great Master (Kobo Daishi)—(Wooden construction with carved, painted eyes; statue height: 36.0 cm. Housed within an unpainted wooden shrine cabinet (zushi), the statue follows the standard iconography: holding a *vajra* scepter in a reverse grip in the right hand, and resting a string of prayer beads on the lap with the left hand. The water jar and ceremonial shoes placed at the statue's feet are not affixed to the base. Both the shrine cabinet and the statue of the Great Master are believed to date back to the early Edo period.) Also housed here is a Standing Statue of the Great Master as an Ascetic. *Note:* While the Daishido is typically opened to the public on an irregular schedule, it was kept open all day, every day, from January 2018 through December 1, 2019. Even after that period, the statue of the Great Master remains accessible for viewing as of the present time (early 2015). Adjacent to the right of the Daishido is a repository for Buddhist statues (not open to the public). The site is reputed to possess divine efficacy for warding off misfortune; it is said to be beneficial to chant the mantra "Namu Daishi Henjo Kongo" a number of times corresponding to one's current age.
- Incense Burner: The ceiling above the incense burner is fitted with hooks for hanging wind chimes, allowing visitors to dedicate a wind chime inscribed with a personal wish. Cost: 1,000 yen per chime.
- Ichinomiya Inari Shrine (Hokora): Established in 1877—when the temple was restored by the Venerable Oishi Ryūhen—this shrine was founded to enshrine the guardian deities of Fushimi Inari (Kyoto), Mogami Inari (Okayama), and Toyokawa Inari (Aichi), with prayers offered for the prosperity of the temple and for the worldly peace and well-being of the people. It is believed to grant blessings regarding the recovery of "lost items" and "success in examinations."
- Yakusute-ba (Misfortune-Casting Area): To cast away misfortune, one whispers a single wish into the opening of a Yakudama (misfortune-casting ball) and then throws it at a designated stone; if the ball shatters upon impact, the wish is said to be granted. Cost: 200 yen per attempt.
- Shinnen Pilgrimage Guidepost: (Currently on long-term display at the Ehime Museum of History and Culture)
- Stone Monument: Located directly opposite the Main Hall stands a commemorative monument erected during the Showa era to mark the dedication of the Zenbutsu (Front Buddha) statue. Inscribed upon it—in the calligraphy of the author himself—is a senryū poem by Goken Maeda: "Buddha's bond—the Treasure-Life, the Great-Life, Kannon Bodhisattva." Additionally, a statue of Hotei (the Laughing Buddha) has recently been placed near this monument, in connection with the Shikoku (Tōyo) Seven Lucky Gods Pilgrimage Route.
- Kuri (Temple Living Quarters)

Upon entering the temple grounds from the east, one finds the Temizuya (purification pavilion), the Inari Shrine, and the Daishidō (Founder's Hall) situated to the right, with the Main Hall standing further ahead. The Nōkyōjo (Pilgrim's Office) is located at the rear of the central area, behind which stands the former Main Hall.

- Shukubō (Temple Lodging): None available.
- Parking: Available (Free).
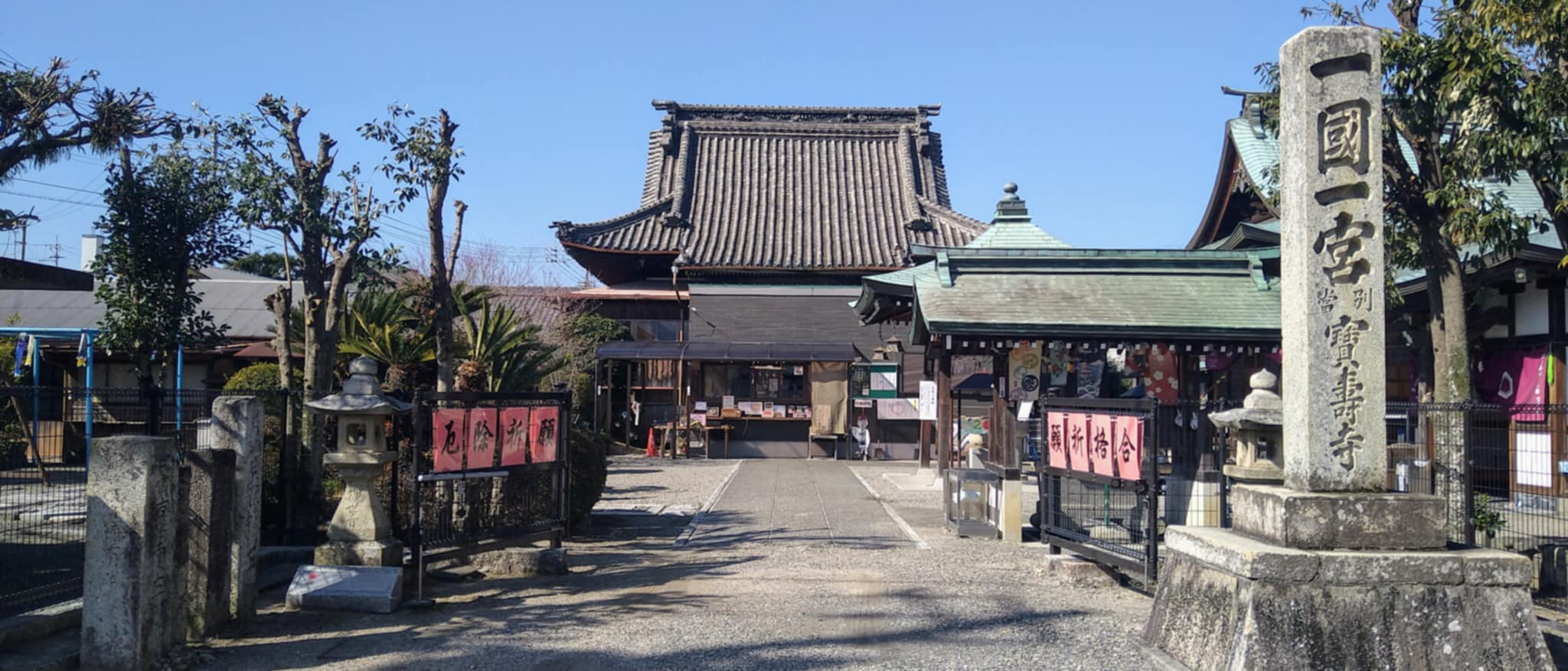
Entrance to the Temple Grounds

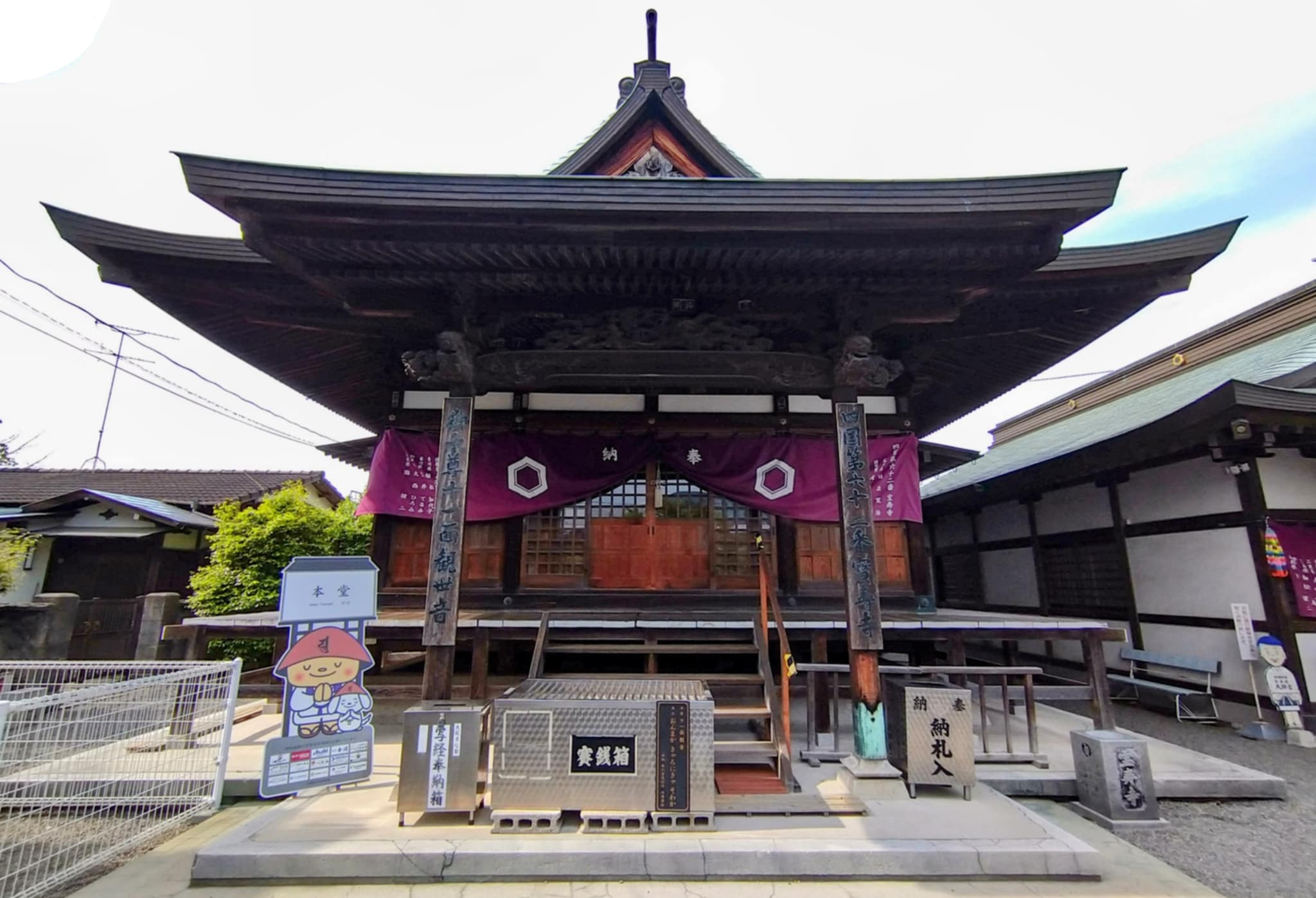
Main Hall

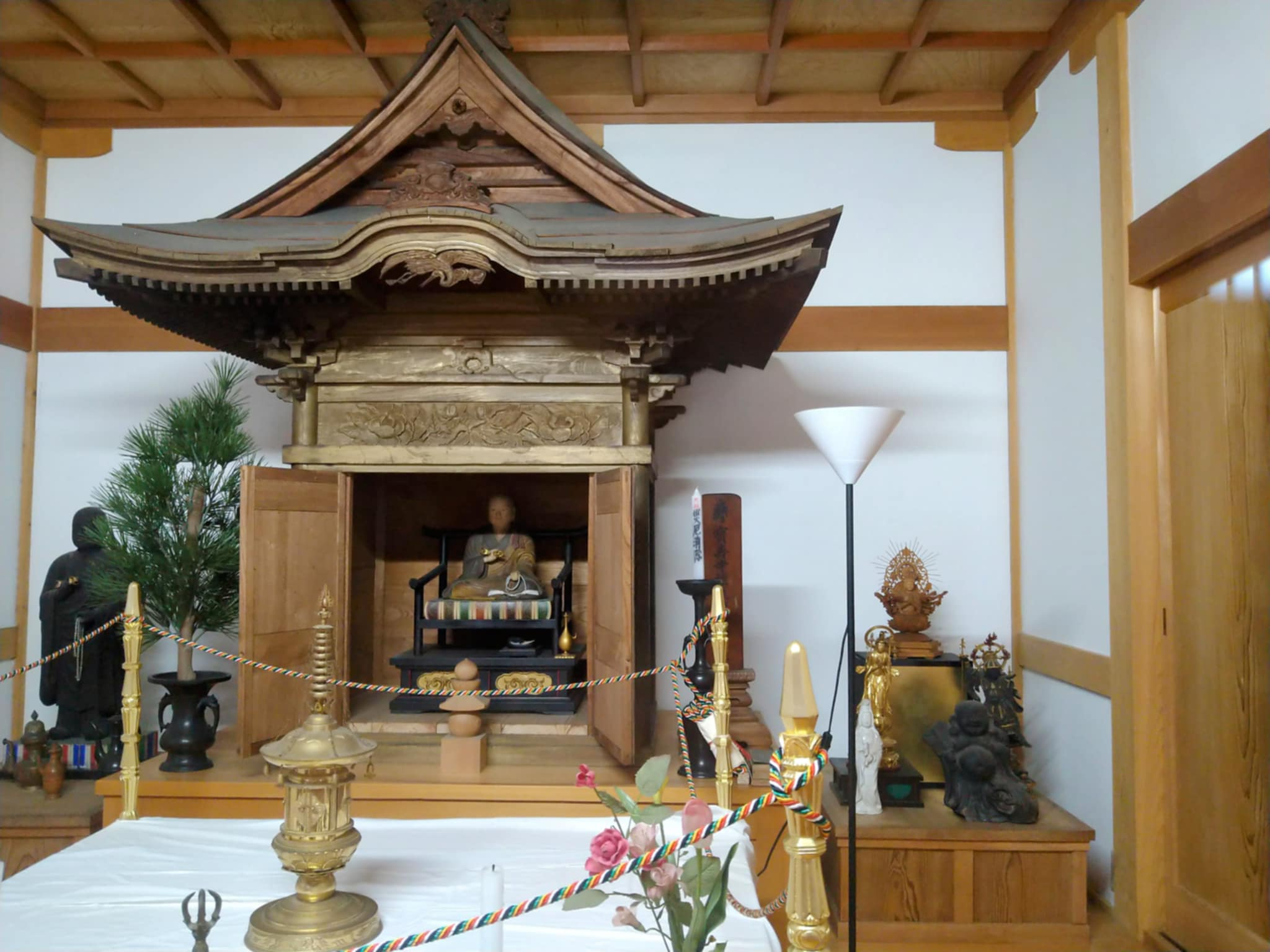
Inner Sanctuary of the Daishidō (Founder's Hall)

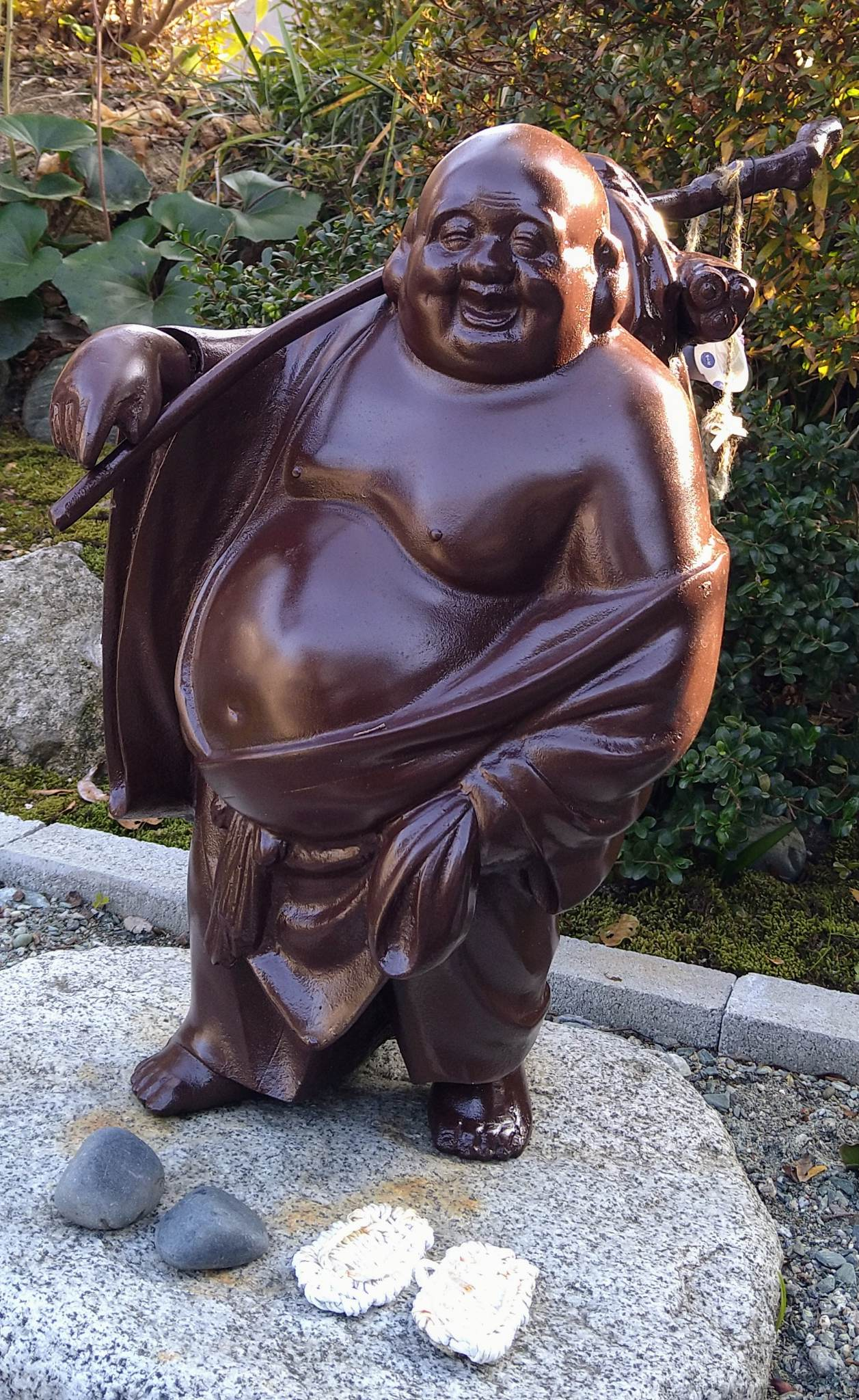
Hotei (The Laughing Buddha)

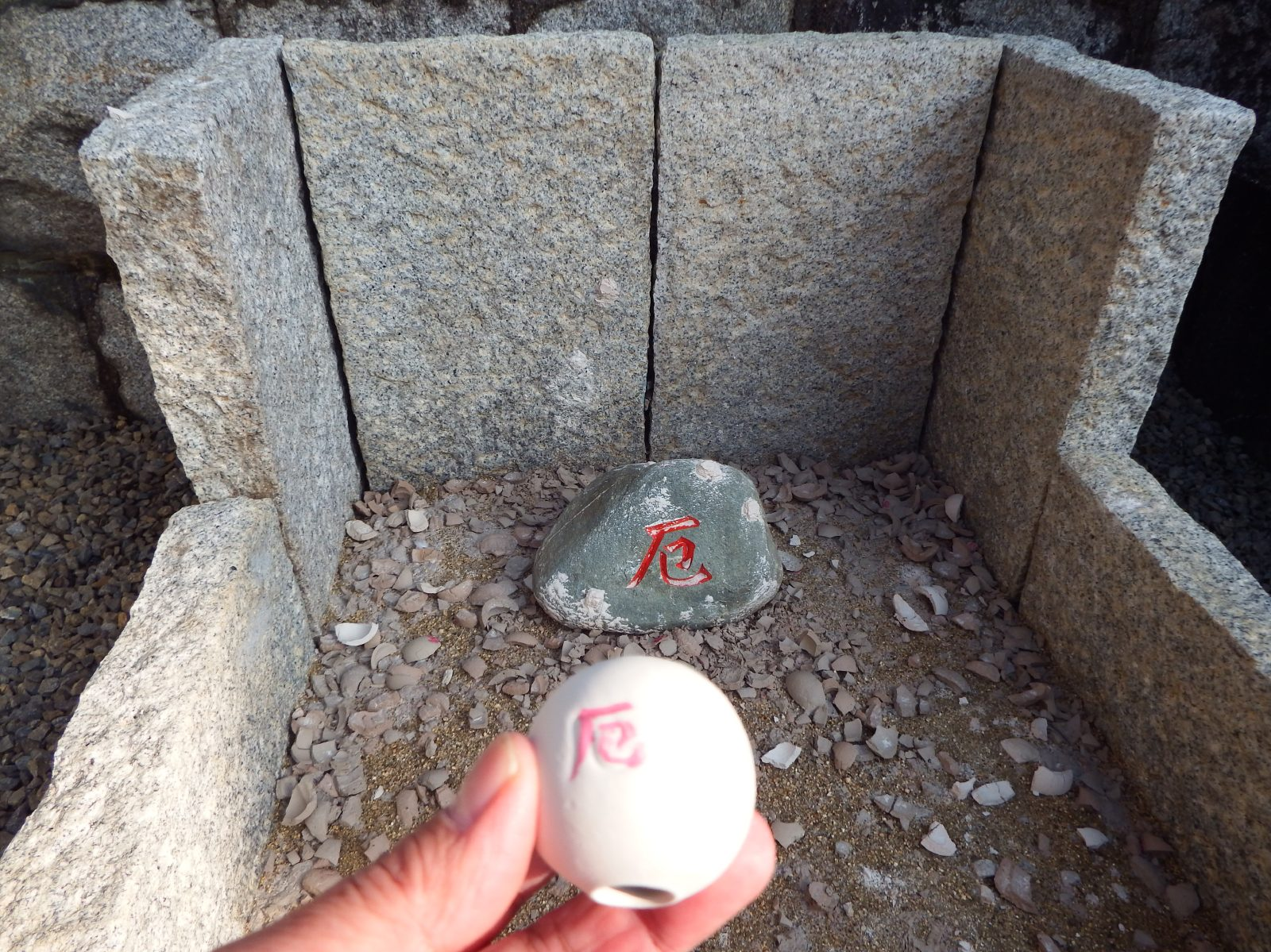
Yakusute-ba (Misfortune-Casting Area)

== Cultural Properties ==
=== Prefecturally Designated Tangible Cultural Property ===
- Kei (Stone Chime) with Peacock Motif (1 piece) – Shoulder width: 17.2 cm; Base width: 18.8 cm; Center height: 7.8 cm; Rim thickness: 0.8 cm; Cast bronze; Early Kamakura period; Designated on April 2, 1965 (Showa 40)

== Access ==
=== Rail ===
- Shikoku Railway Company (JR Shikoku) Yosan Line – Alight at Iyo-Komatsu Station (0.2 km)

=== Bus ===
- Setouchi Bus (Routes bound for Niihama and others) – Alight at "Komatsu-ekimae" (0.1 km)

=== Roads ===
- General Roads: National Route 11 (Komatsu-ekimae) (0.1 km)
- Expressways: Matsuyama Expressway – Iyo-Komatsu Interchange (5.5 km)

== Ichinomiya Bettō ==
Ichinomiya Shrine

- Location: Shinyashiki, Komatsu-cho, Saijo City (33°53′54″N 133°6′59.1″E)
- Enshrined Deities
  - Ōkuninushi-no-Ōkami
  - Ōyamatsumi-no-Ōkami
  - Kotoshironushi-no-Ōkami
- Overview
  Currently, this shrine is situated to the north of this temple and JR Iyo-Komatsu Station. To the right (north) side of the *torii* gate stands a stone monument marking the former site of the *Bettō* (administrative temple) Hoju-ji, which was erected in March 1992 (Heisei 4). According to the inscription on the back of the monument, the shrine was relocated from the village of Shirotsubo to its current location in 1679 (Enpō 7) by order of the local feudal lord. When Chōzen undertook his pilgrimage in 1653 (Jōō 2), this shrine—which was then located in Shirotsubo—served as a designated pilgrimage site (*fudasho*), and its *Bettō* temple, "Hoju-ji," was situated at the very spot where this monument now stands. Since one of Chōzen's old friends served as the shrine priest (*shasō*) for this shrine—and the temple served as his residence—Chōzen stayed there overnight on that occasion. Furthermore, the diary of Chōzen records that due to repeated flooding of the Nakayama River, the shrine was relocated to the hillside on several occasions—sometimes moved away from the river, and other times returned to its original site. Additionally, a stone monument states that, in accordance with the anti-Buddhist *Haibutsu-kishaku* decree issued in the first year of the Meiji era (1868), this temple was relocated in March 1879 to a site immediately south of the shrine; later, in May 1923, due to the construction of a railway line, it was newly rebuilt and relocated to its current location (situated further to the south).
  Incidentally, the *Ichinomiya* (First Shrine) of Iyo Province is the Ōyamazumi Shrine on Ōmishima Island (known as Ōyamazumi Shrine prior to the early Meiji era). It is said that the shrine in question originated when the deity of Ōyamazumi—known as Mishima Myōjin—was ceremonially invited (*kanjō*) and enshrined at Shirotsubo, near the mouth of the Nakayama River; consequently, this site, too, came to be referred to as an *Ichinomiya*.
  However, the *Kūshō Shinnō Shikoku Reijō Gojunki* (Record of Prince Kūshō's Pilgrimage to the Shikoku Sacred Sites; written by Kenmyō in 1638) describes it as the "Ichinomiya of Ōkuninushi." This suggests that the shrine did not originate from a ceremonial invitation from Ōyamazumi Shrine—which enshrines a different deity—but rather possesses an independent origin. Furthermore, the presence of a stone monument inscribed "Ichikoku Ichinomiya Bettō Hōju-ji" (Hōju-ji Temple: Administrator of the Provincial Ichinomiya) makes it impossible to rule out the possibility that this site—much like three other locations in neighboring prefectures (Note: Shimo-Ichinomiya Ōawa Shrine, Tosa Ichinomiya Kōkamo Daimyōjin, and Tamura Daimyōjin)—was selected as a designated temple (*fudasho*) of the Shikoku 88-Temple Pilgrimage specifically because it served as the officially recognized *Ichinomiya* of the province, possessing its own distinct history of inception. In this context, it is believed that Oyamazumi Shrine was selected as a sacred site and pilgrimage stop—specifically for the formal version of the pilgrimage route—not in its capacity as the *Ichinomiya* (chief shrine) of the province, but rather as the sole "Grand Guardian Shrine of All Japan." (Note: Just as four *Kokubun-ji* temples from each prefecture were selected as pilgrimage stops, four *Ichinomiya* shrines from each prefecture were similarly chosen.) (Note: In the writings of Kenmyō, Chōzen, Shinnen, Jakuhon, and the *Shikoku Henreimeisho Zue* (Illustrated Guide to Famous Pilgrimage Sites in Shikoku)—all of which list the four sites other than the *Bekku* (Oyamazumi Shrine) as *Ichinomiya*—the *Bekku* alone is referred to by other names, such as "Mishima-no-miya"; no text refers to it specifically as an *Ichinomiya*.)
  - Auxiliary Shrines (*Sessha*)
    Tamashii Shrine (Amaterasu-ōmikami and three other deities), Warei Shrine (Yamaga Kimiyori), Tenmangū (Sugawara no Michizane), Itsukushima Shrine (Ichikishimahime-no-mikoto and three other deities), Yasukuni Shrine (Spirits of parishioners who died in war)
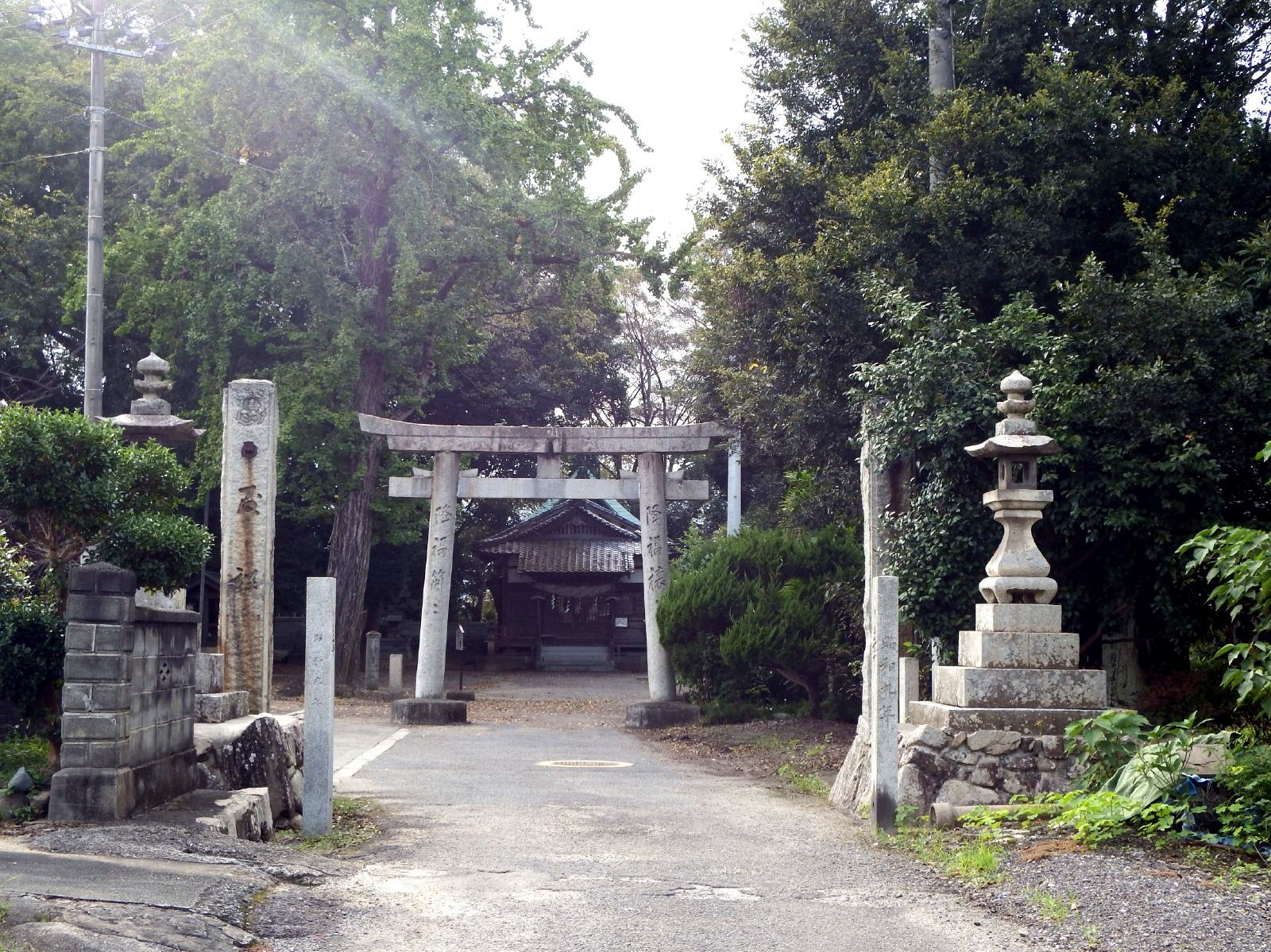
Entrance to Ichinomiya Shrine

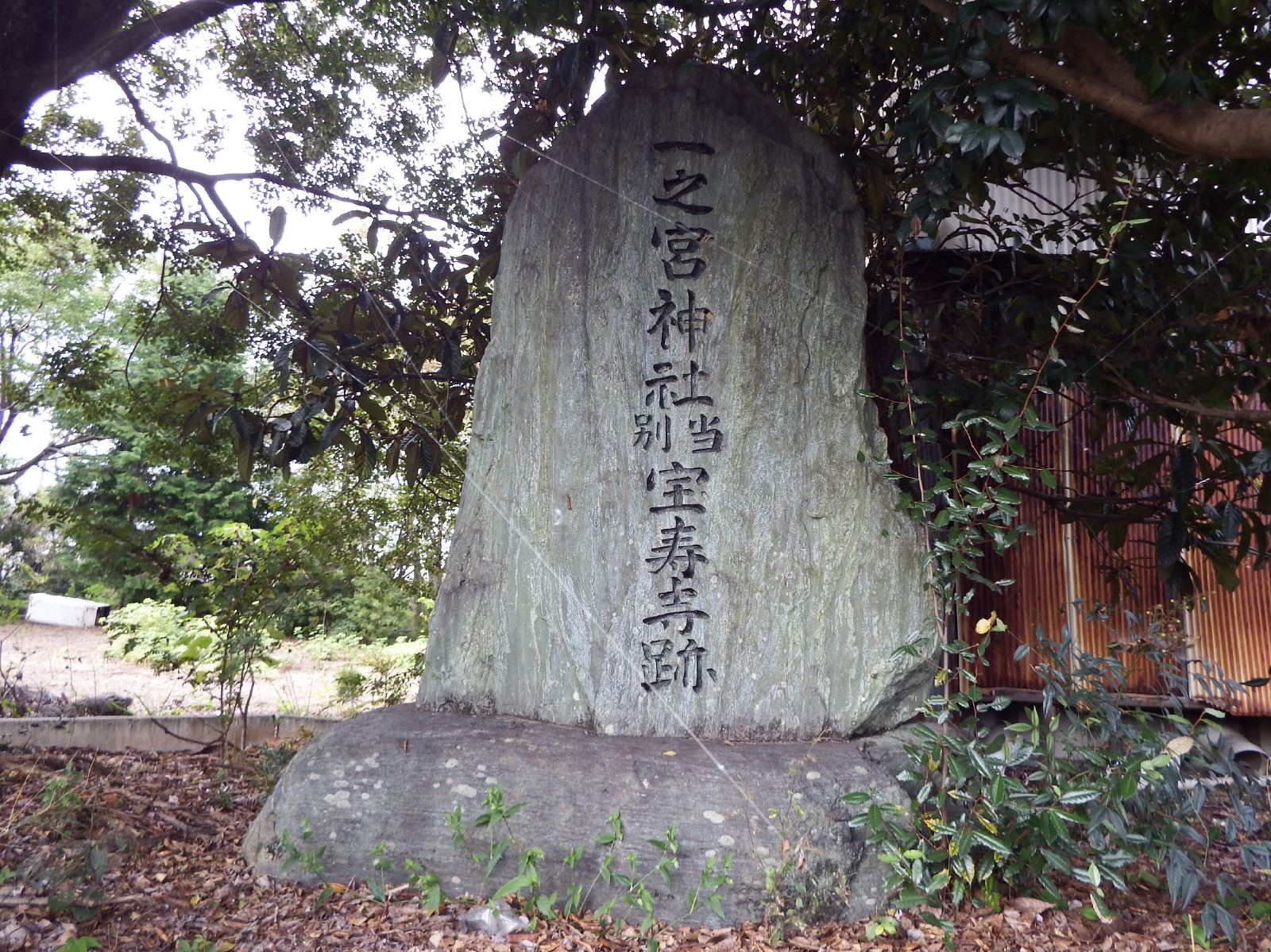
Stone Monument Marking the Site of Hōju-ji Temple

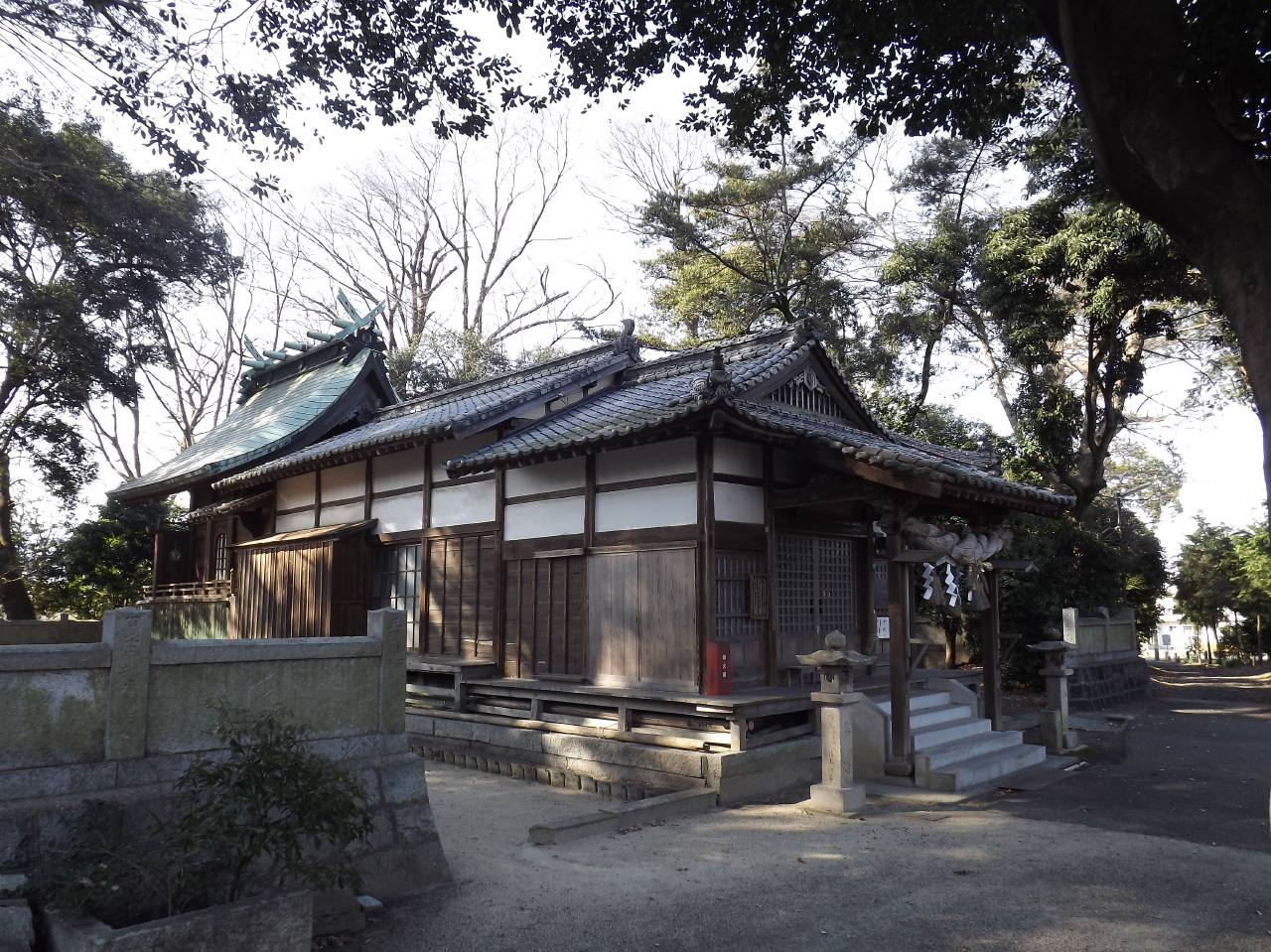
Shrine Pavilion

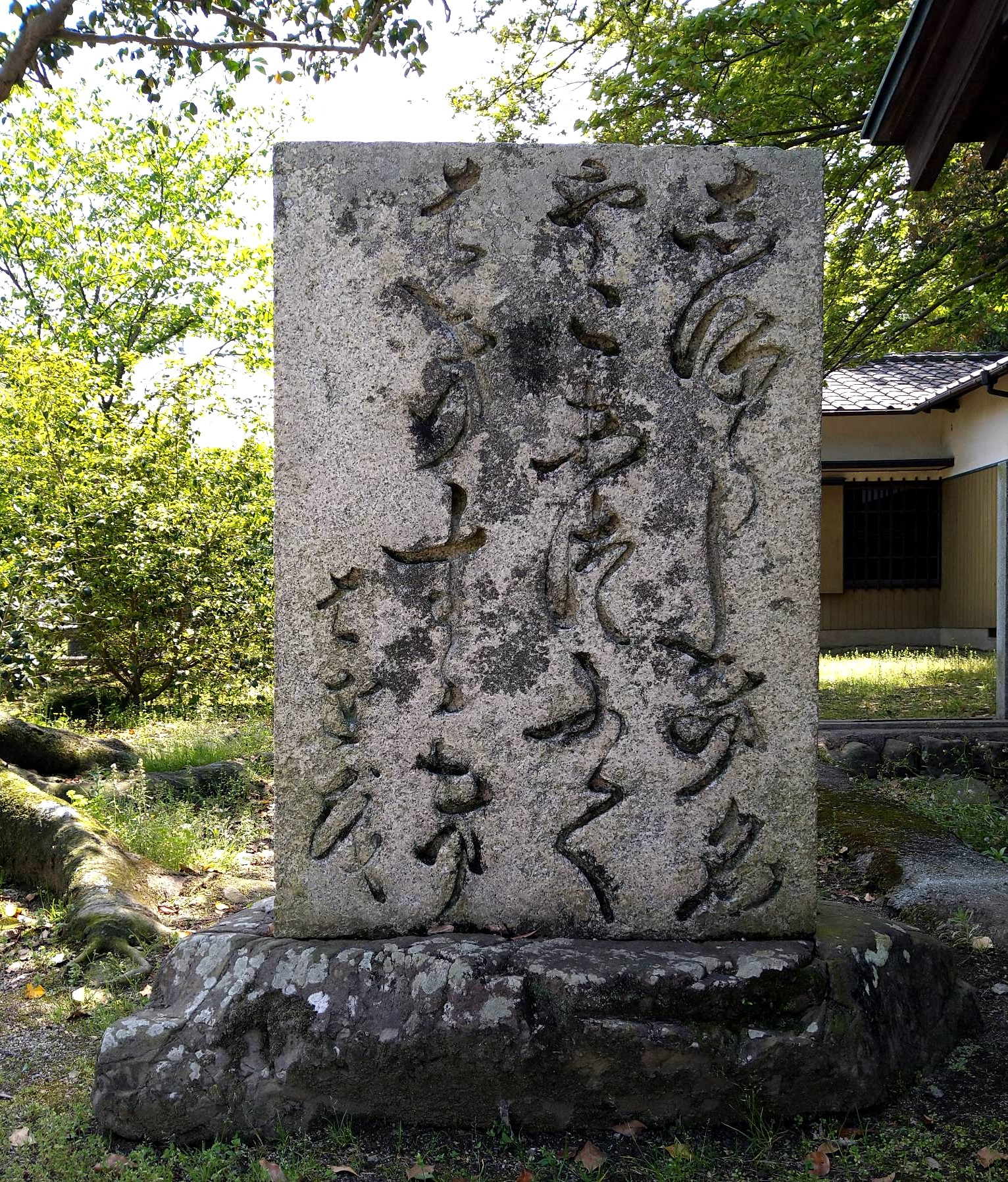
Haiku Monument of Matsuo Bashō
- Bashō's Haiku Monument—"Shihorashiki na ya / Komatsu ni fuku / Hagi susuki" (A name of touching grace / where the bush clover and pampas grass / sway in the breeze at Komatsu): Erected in 1843 by Hasebe Eimon (a magistrate of the Komatsu Domain and a leading haiku poet of Iyo Province) to commemorate the 150th anniversary of Bashō's passing; a haiku gathering was held at the site on October 12 of that year. The calligraphy on the monument was executed by Kusaka Hakugen (a Confucian scholar of the Matsuyama Domain).

== Neighboring Temples ==
Shikoku Pilgrimage (88 Temples)
61 Kōon-ji --(1.3 km)-- 62 Hōju-ji --(1.4 km)-- 63 Kichijō-ji
- Note: There are multiple routes for the pilgrimage path; the distances listed above are based on the standard route.

== Bibliography ==
- Hashimoto Teima (1956). Shikoku Henro-ki. Shiunsō Shuppan-bu. p. 11. JPNO 56012533.
- Watanabe Teruhiro (2000). O-Daishi-sama (Revised New ed.). Aoyama Shoin. JPNO 20227310.

== See Also ==
- Shikoku Pilgrimage
