= Iyo-Himi Station =

Railway station in Saijō, Ehime Prefecture, Japan

Y33 Iyo-Himi Station 伊予氷見駅
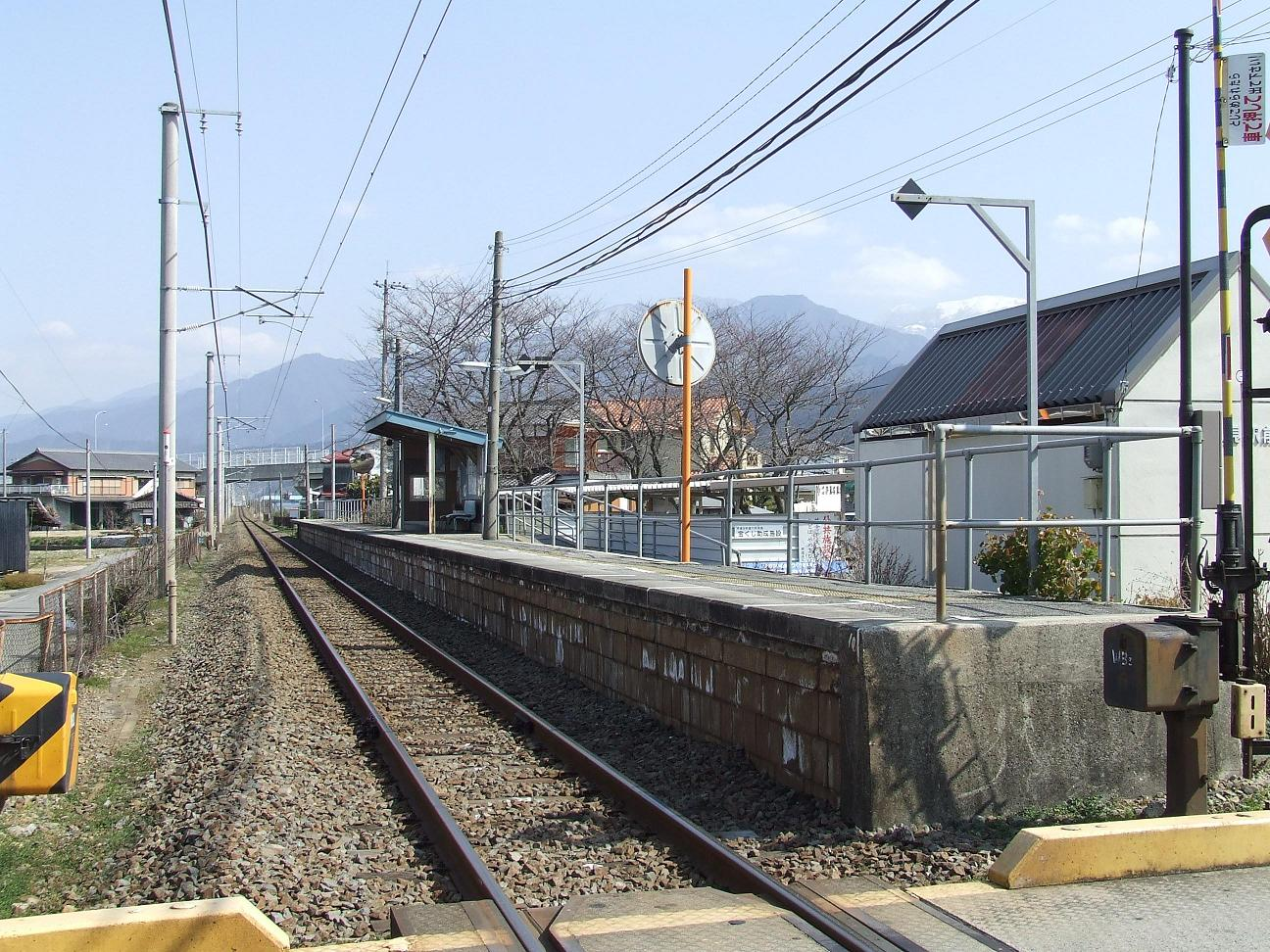
- Iyo-Himi Station in 2008

General information
- Location: Himiotsu, Saijō-shi, Ehime-ken 793-0072; Japan
- Coordinates: 33°53′48″N 133°07′51″E
- Operator: JR Shikoku
- Line: ■ Yosan Line
- Distance: 120.3 km from Takamatsu
- Platforms: 1 side platform
- Tracks: 1

Construction
- Structure type: At grade
- Cycle facilities: Bike shed

Other information
- Status: Unstaffed
- Station code: Y33

History
- Opened: 1 June 1961; 65 years ago
- Rebuilt: ,

Passengers
- FY2019: 116
Location
- Location within Ehime Prefecture Location within Japan

Iyo-Himi Station (伊予氷見駅, Iyo-Himi-eki) is a passenger railway station located in the city of Saijō, Ehime Prefecture, Japan. It is operated by JR Shikoku and has the station number "Y33".

== Lines ==
Iyo-Himi Station is served by the JR Shikoku Yosan Line and is located 120.3 km from the beginning of the line at Takamatsu Station. Only Yosan Line local trains stop at the station and they only serve the sector between Iyo-Saijō and Matsuyama. Connections with other local or limited express trains are needed to travel further east or west along the line.

== Layout ==
The station, which is unstaffed, consists of a side platform serving a single track. There is no station building, only a shelter on the platform. A ramp leads up to the platform from the access road. Bike sheds are located behind the station platform at the base of the ramp.

== Adjacent stations ==
| « | Service | » |
Yosan Line
| Ishizuchiyama | Local | Iyo-Komatsu |

== History ==
Japanese National Railways (JNR) opened Iyo-Himi Station on 1 June 1961 as a new station on the existing Yosan Line. With the privatization of JNR on 1 April 1987, control of the station passed to JR Shikoku.

== Surrounding area ==
- Saijo Saijo Seibu Park
- Kichijō-ji, 63rd temple of the Shikoku Pilgrimage
- Ishioka Shrine

== See also ==
- List of railway stations in Japan
