= Iwamatsu =

Area in Tshushima, Ehime Prefecture, Japan

Coordinates: 33.1235°N 132.5227°E

Iwamatsu is the center in the historic port town of Tsushima (Tsushima-cho) in Ehime Prefecture, Japan. Iwamatsu is located near the Iwamatsu River mouth that debouches into Seto Inland Sea. In 2005, Tsushima along with Yoshida and Mima were absorbed into the city of Uwajima.

== History ==
Iwamatsu started from a small settlement in the 17th century and quickly grew. With a port access, the Sake brewing industry became the main economic engine that propelled it in to a flourishing port town. As the shipping industry changed in the 20th century, the historical port hubs like Iwamatsu became obsolete. The population in Iwamatsu has been in constant decline and the area is heading toward becoming largely abandoned.

== Tourism ==
Iwamatsu Machinami is a historic street that is promoted by Uwajima City as a tourist attraction with a reference to Shishi Bunroku's novel "Ten'ya Wan'ya". There are approximately 20 historic houses from the Meiji era (1868–1911) and additional 30 other historic buildings. Iwamatsu was listed as one of 25 sites of the 2020 World Monuments Watch published by World Monuments Fund (WMF) for preservation efforts.
