= Tsushima, Ehime =

Dissolved municipality in Kitauwa district, Ehime prefecture, Japan

Tsushima (津島町, Tsushima-chō) was a town located in Kitauwa District, Ehime Prefecture, Japan.

As of 2003, the town had an estimated population of 13,284 and a density of 60.10 persons per km^{2}. The total area was 221.05 km^{2}.

On August 1, 2005, Tsushima, along with the towns of Mima and Yoshida (all from Kitauwa District), was merged into the expanded city of Uwajima.

Tsushima residents are also known for pearl farming and fish farming, as well as being part of the prefecture's mikan growing industry.

Nanrakuen Park is a beautiful place to go for a walk when you're there. There's also a children's amusement area called Playland across the street.

== Tourism ==
Tsushima is known for the Iwamatsu River and the festival, "Shirauo Matsuri", they have each year where people eat tiny, live fish. Another festival is "Tsushima Summer Matsuri" which is held in August.

Iwamatsu Machinami in Iwamatsu is a historic street that is promoted by Uwajima City as a tourist attraction with a reference to Shishi Bunroku's novel "Ten'ya Wan'ya". There are approximately 20 historic houses from the Meiji era (1868–1911) and an additional 30 other historic buildings. Iwamatsu was listed as one of 25 sites of the 2020 World Monuments Watch published by the World Monuments Fund (WMF) for preservation efforts.
