= Thutmose =

G26 ms
or
G26 F31 s A1
or
G26 ms s
Thutmose
in hieroglyphs
Era: New Kingdom
(1550–1069 BC)

Thutmose (/θuːtˈmoʊsə/; also rendered Thutmoses, Thutmosis, Tuthmose, Tutmosis, Thothmes, Tuthmosis, Thutmes, Dhutmose, Djhutmose, Djehutymes, etc.) is an anglicization of the ancient Egyptian personal name dhwty-ms, usually translated as "Born of the god Thoth".

Thoúthmōsis (Θούθμωσις) is the Hellenized form of the Egyptian Ḏḥwtj-mś (reconstructed pronunciation: /tʼaˈħawtij ˈmissaw/) and means "Born of Thoth". This theophoric name was part of the royal titulary of four pharaohs of the 18th dynasty as the name of Sa-Rê or "birth name". It was also worn by the eldest son of Amenhotep III, high priest of Ptah, as well as by a vizier who exercised his functions successively under Thutmose IV and Amenhotep III. Under this last king and under his successor, Amenhotep IV, two other high dignitaries, royal sons of Kush, similarly called themselves "Born[s] of Thoth".

== Ancient Egyptians ==
=== Monarchs and royals ===
The name was common among royals of the Eighteenth Dynasty, which is thus sometimes called the "Thutmosid" Dynasty from the reign of Thutmose I onward.

- Thutmose I (16th-century–c. 1490 BC), third pharaoh of the Eighteenth Dynasty
- Thutmose II (fl. 1493–1479 BC), fourth pharaoh
- Thutmose III (fl. 1479–1425 BC), "the Conqueror" or "the Great", sixth pharaoh
- Thutmose IV (died 14th-century BC), eighth pharaoh
- Crown Prince Thutmose, the elder brother of Pharaoh Akhenaten

=== Royal officials ===
- Thutmose (18th-dynasty vizier), Vizier during the reign of Thutmose IV
- Thutmose (19th-dynasty vizier), Vizier during the latter part of the reign of Ramesses II during the 19th dynasty
- Tuthmose (Viceroy of Kush), the Viceroy of Kush during the reign of Akhenaten

=== Other Egyptians ===
- Thutmose (sculptor) (fl. 1350 BC), Akhenaten's court sculptor at Amarna, to whom is attributed the famous Berlin bust of Nefertiti
- Thutmose (scribe) (fl. 11th-century BC), father of Butehamun, himself a scribe

== Others ==
- Thutmose (musician) (born 1995), stage name of the Nigerian-American rapper Umar Ibrahim
- Thutmose Kamel Gabrial (1924-1948), an Egyptian military pilot who was killed in action during the 1948 Palestine War.
