= Amenhotep (official) =

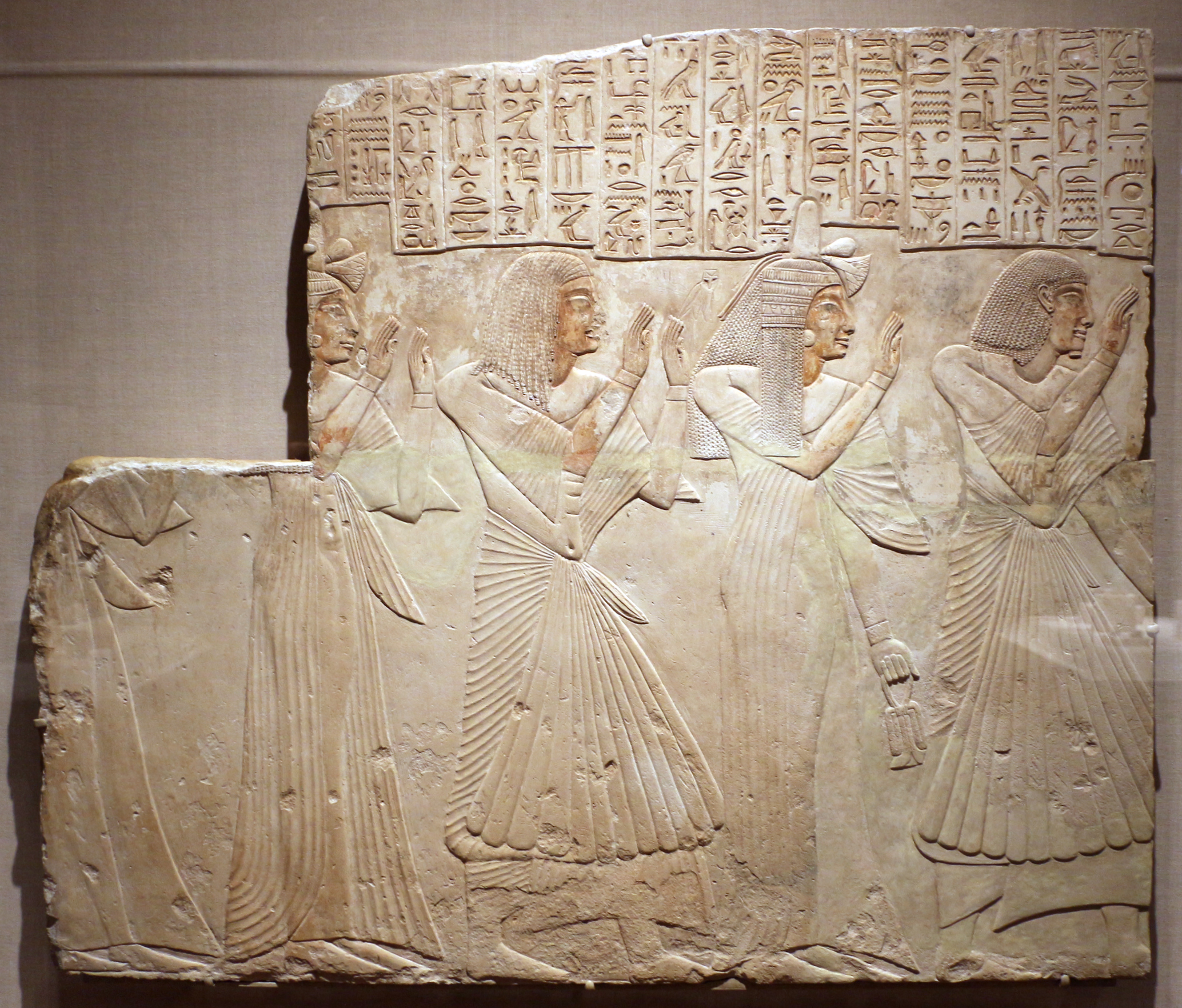
Wall relief from the tomb of Amenhotep at Asyut, now in the Cleveland Museum of Art.

Amenhotep was an ancient Egyptian official and chief physician of the early 19th Dynasty. He is mainly known from his decorated tomb chapel that was excavated in 1913–14 by Ahmed Bey Kamal at Asyut, in Middle Egypt.

Amenhotep hold several titles, such as king's scribe, chief lector priest, overseer of wab priests of Sakhmet and chief physician. His wife is depicted in the tomb chapel. She was the song-tress of Wepwawet and song-tress of Amun-Ra Renenutet. His son Yuny is known from a statue found not far away and was also overseer of wab priests of Sakhmet and chief physician. His grandson Khay also held the latter position.

The tomb chapel of Amenhotep was once relatively small, perhaps once only three meters long, 1.52 meter wide and 2.40 meter high. The ceiling was vaulted. The walls are decorated with a combination of painted, raised and sunken relief. On the back wall, Amenhotep is shown twice sitting at an offering table. On a second, higher register he is shown twice in front of Osiris. On the right side of the chapel he is again shown in front of Osiris in the judgement scene. On the left wall, Amenhotep and his family are shown guided by Hathor to the sun god Ra and Anubis. The chapel was found well preserved and even substantial remains of the colouring remained. Today the fragments are in different collections. Substantial parts of the back and the right wall are in the Egyptian Museum of Berlin, main parts of the left wall are in the Cleveland Museum of Art.
