= Pasha Palace =

Pasha Palace may refer to:

- Alexan Pasha Palace, Egypt
- Ibrahim Pasha Palace, Turkey
- Ishak Pasha Palace, Turkey
- Pasha's Palace Museum, Gaza
- Khairy Pasha Palace, Egypt
