= Assemblies of God of Egypt =

The Assemblies of God of Egypt is a Pentecostal denomination which is present in Egypt. The number of its members possibly exceeds 100,000. It was established in 1920.

== See also ==
- Christianity in Egypt
- Lillian Trasher
- Copts
