= 2020 World Monuments Watch =

The World Monuments Watch is a flagship advocacy program of the New York–based private non-profit organization World Monuments Fund (WMF) that calls international attention to cultural heritage around the world that is threatened by neglect, vandalism, conflict, or disaster.

== Selection process ==
Every two years, it publishes a select list known as the Watch List of Endangered Sites that are in urgent need of preservation funding and protection. The sites are nominated by governments, conservation professionals, site caretakers, non-government organizations (NGOs), concerned individuals, and others working in the field. An independent panel of international experts then select 100 candidates from these entries to be part of the Watch List, based on the significance of the sites, the urgency of the threat, and the viability of both advocacy and conservation solutions. For the succeeding two-year period until a new Watch List is published, these 100 sites can avail grants and funds from the WMF, as well as from other foundations, private donors, and corporations by capitalizing on the publicity and attention gained from the inclusion on the Watch List.

== 2020 Watch List ==
The 2020 Watch List call for nomination was announced in January 2019 with the deadline in March 2019. More than 250 nominees were submitted. Twenty five sites were selected to be included in the list.

Site^{[A]}	Image	Location^{[B]}
Koutammakou, Land of the Batammariba		Benin and Togo
Ontario Place		Ontario, Canada
Easter Island (Rapa Nui)—Orongo		Easter Island, Chile
Alexan Palace		Asyut, Egypt
Notre-Dame of Paris		Paris, France
Bennerley Viaduct		Derbyshire and Nottinghamshire, England
Tusheti National Park		Georgia
Gingerbread Neighborhood		Port-au-Prince, Haiti
Historic Water Systems of the Deccan Plateau		Karnataka and Maharashtra, India
Sardar Vallabhbhai Patel Stadium		Ahmedabad, India
Mam Rashan Shrine		Mount Sinjar, Iraq
Inari-yu bathhouse		Kita, Tokyo, Japan
Iwamatsu District		Uwajima, Ehime Prefecture, Japan
Canal Nacional		Mexico City, Mexico
Traditional Burmese Teak Farmhouses		Myanmar
Choijin Lama Temple		Ulaanbaatar, Mongolia
Chivas and Chaityas of the Kathmandu Valley		Kathmandu Valley, Nepal
Anarkali Bazaar		Lahore, Pakistan
Sacred Valley of the Incas		Cusco Region, Peru
Kindler Chapel, Pabianice Evangelical Cemetery		Łódź Voivodeship, Poland
Courtyard Houses of Axerquía		Córdoba, Spain
Bears Ears National Monument		Utah, United States
Central Aguirre Historic District		Aguirre, Puerto Rico, United States
San Antonio Woolworth Building		San Antonio, Texas, United States
Traditional Houses in the Old Jewish Mahalla of Bukhara		Bukhara, Uzbekistan

== Notes ==
A. Names and spellings used for the sites were based on the official 2020 Watch List as published.
B. The references to the sites' locations and periods of construction were based on the official 2020 Watch List as published.
