= Raymond Ken'ichi Tanaka =

Catholic Bishop (1927–2021)

- Bishop of Kyoto
- Native name: ライムンド 田中健一
- Church: Catholic Church
- Diocese: Diocese of Kyoto
- In office: 8 July 1976 – 3 March 1997
- Predecessor: Paul Yoshiyuki Furuya
- Successor: Paul Yoshinao Otsuka

Orders
- Ordination: 21 December 1951
- Consecration: 23 September 1976 by Paul Yoshigoro Taguchi

Personal details
- Born: 31 August 1927 Uwajima, Ehime Prefecture, Empire of Japan
- Died: 29 July 2021 (aged 93) Uwajima, Ehime Prefecture, Japan

Raymond Ken'ichi Tanaka (31 August 1927 – 29 July 2021) was a Japanese Roman Catholic prelate, who served as the Bishop of the Roman Catholic Diocese of Kyoto, seated in Kyoto, from 8 July 1976, until 3 March 1997.

== Early life ==
Tanaka was born on 31 August 1927, in Uwajima, Ehime Prefecture, Japan. He was ordained as a Catholic priest on 21 December 1951.

== Appointment as bishop ==
On 8 July 1976, Pope Paul VI appointed Tanaka as the Bishop of the Diocese of Kyoto and his ordination was held on 23 September 1976. He served as Bishop of Kyoto until his mandatory retirement 3 March 1997, but remained bishop emeritus for the rest of his life.

== Death ==
Bishop Emeritus Raymond Ken'ichi Tanaka died in Uwajima on 29 July 2021, at the age of 93.
