= Ryuji Miyade =

Japanese baseball player and coach (born 1977)

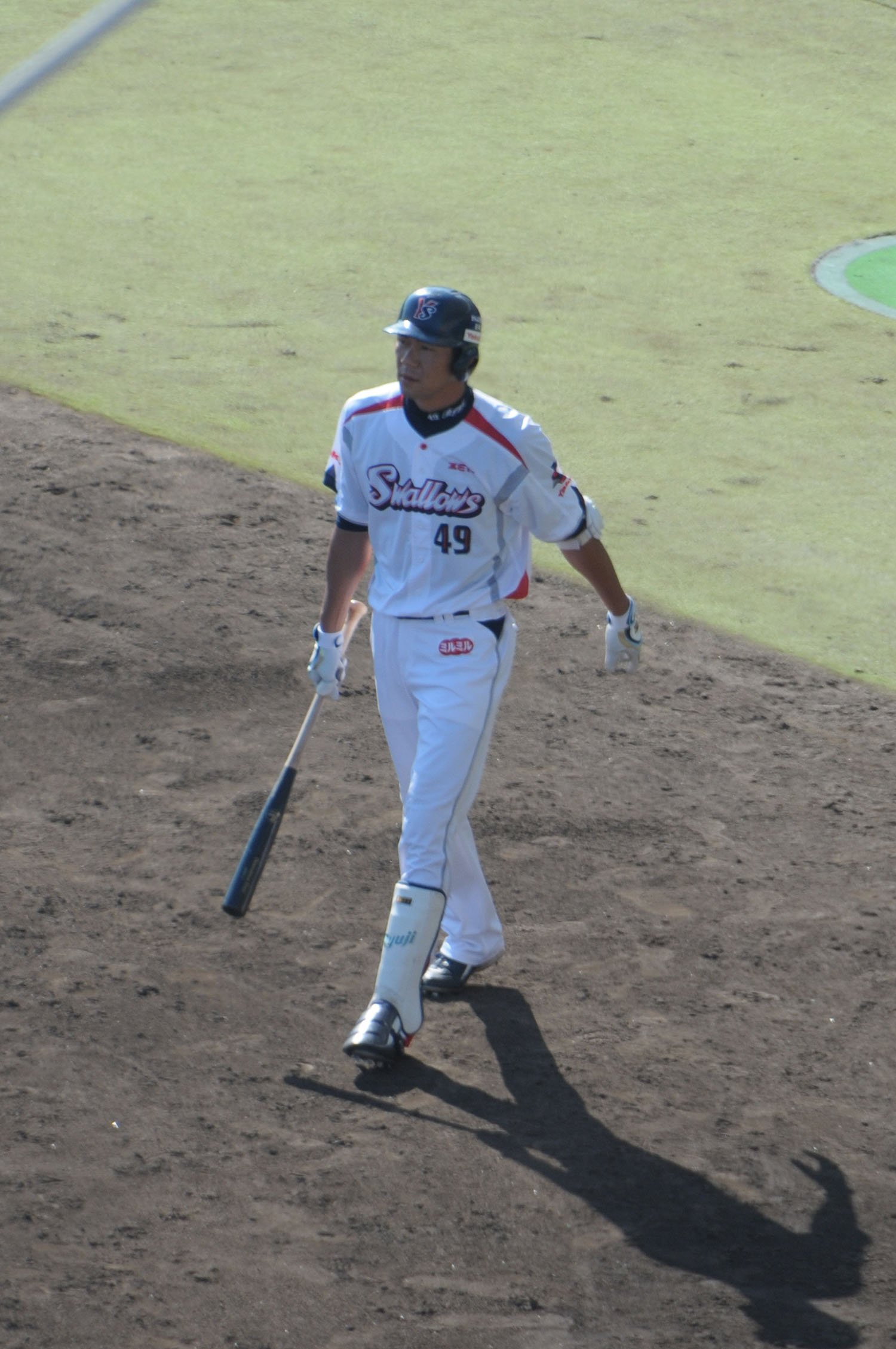
- Outfielder / Coach
- Born: August 18, 1977 (age 49); Uwajima, Ehime, Japan
- Batted: Right Threw: Right

NPB debut
- April 5, 1998, for the Yakult Swallows

Last NPB appearance
- October 7, 2012, for the Tokyo Yakult Swallows

NPB statistics (through 2012)
- Batting average: .277
- Home runs: 39
- Hits: 458
- Stats at Baseball Reference

Teams
- As player: Yakult Swallows/Tokyo Yakult Swallows (1996–2009, 2011–2012); Tohoku Rakuten Golden Eagles (2009–2010); As coach: Tokyo Yakult Swallows (2013–2025)
- Last updated on: 4 February 2017

Ryuji Miyade (宮出 隆自, Miyade Ryūji; born August 18, 1977) is a former Nippon Professional Baseball outfielder.
