= Inari-yu =

Communal bathhouse in Kita, Tokyo, Japan

Coordinates: 35.7447°N 139.7244°E

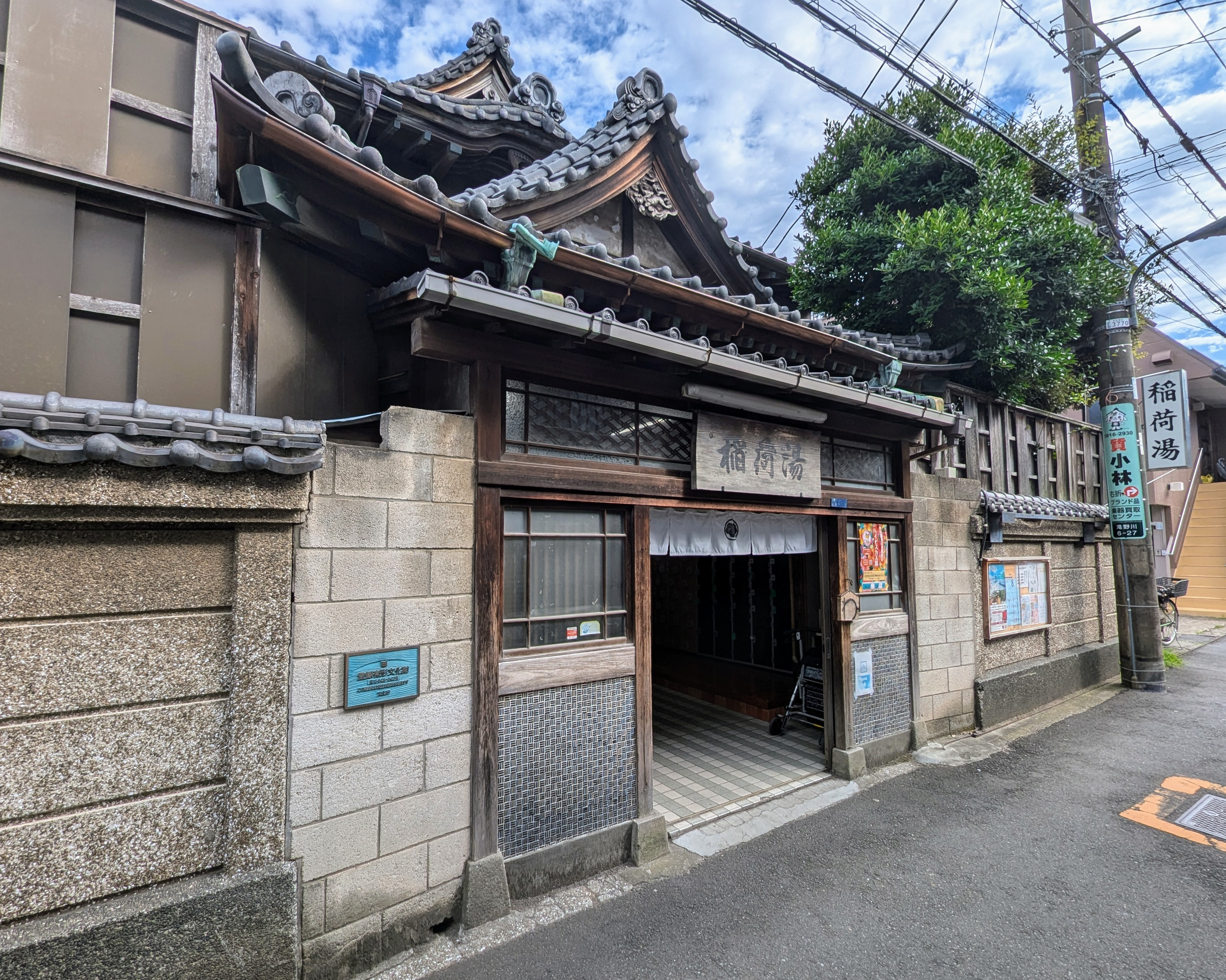
Entrance (2025)

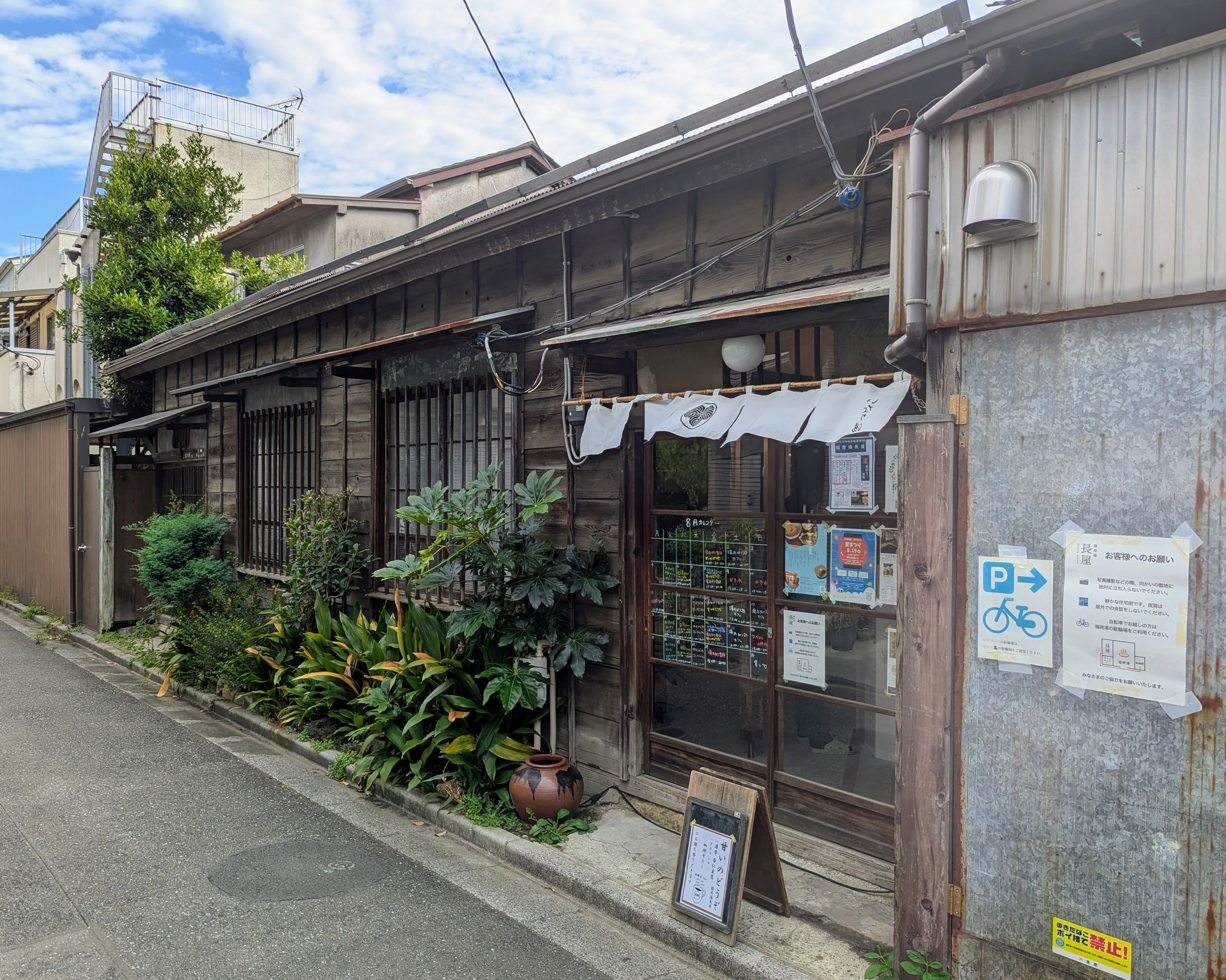
adjacent structure (Inari-yu Nagaya)

Inari-yu is a Japanese communal bathhouse (sentō) in Kita, Tokyo in Japan. It was built in 1930 with traditional architecture of Japanese temples. This building was listed as a Registered Tangible Cultural Property in 2019. It was the second bathhouse in Tokyo and only dozens more nationwide to be listed.

Inari-yu was listed as one of 25 sites of the 2020 World Monuments Watch published by World Monuments Fund (WMF) to recognize its innovative approach to preservation by transforming an adjacent structure to a social gathering facility to suit the 21st century lifestyle while still keeping the traditional communal bathing alive. Additionally, the operator has opened it up more to serve foreign tourists by having multilingual explanatory signage on how to use the bathhouse. WMF hopes that it can be a model for preservations of bathhouses elsewhere given that only about 500 bathhouses still remain in Tokyo and one bathhouse closes down each week.

== In popular culture ==
Inari-yu with a large mural dejecting Mount Fuji was a film shooting location of Thermae Romae that was based on a Japanese Manga of the same name.
