= Lillian Trasher =

American christian missionary in Egypt

Lillian Hunt Trasher
- Born: 27 September 1887; Jacksonville, Florida
- Died: 17 December 1961 (aged 74); Asyut, Egypt

Lillian Hunt Trasher (27 September 1887 – 17 December 1961) was an American Christian missionary to Asyut, Egypt, as well as the founder of the first orphanage in Egypt. She is famed as the "Nile Mother" of Egypt.

== Early life ==
Trasher was born in Jacksonville, Florida. Her mother was a Quaker, but became a Roman Catholic and Lillian was raised as a Catholic in Brunswick, Georgia. According to one account, her Quaker family had moved to the South after the Civil War.

Trasher came to the Holiness-Pentecostal faith through Miss Mattie Perry, an independent Holiness evangelist and activist.

While still in her late teens, Trasher attended Bible college for one term, and then worked at Miss Perry's Faith Orphanage in North Carolina in 1908–1910, after she failed to get a reporting job that she wanted. After becoming engaged to marry minister Tom Jordan, Trasher heard a missionary from India speak. Deciding that her mission lay in Africa, she broke off the engagement ten days before the wedding after her prospective husband failed to share her call. Trasher also taught at a second Bible school in South Carolina, pastored a Pentecostal church, and briefly travelled with an evangelist, but later returned to work again at the orphanage.

In 1910 after meeting Pastor Brelsford (or Perlsford) of Assiout, Egypt at a missionary conference, Trasher decided to defy her family's wishes and leave for that country. Inspired as well by opening a bible to Acts 7:34, which referred to Egypt, Lilian and her sister Jennie sailed to Africa with less than 100 dollars in their pockets.

== Arrival in Egypt and starting the orphanage ==
Arriving in Assiout, (some 230 miles south of Cairo), she soon met a man who came to the mission house seeking someone to attend to a dying woman nearby. Lillian and an older woman named Sela went to see the woman, who died shortly after they arrived, but left them her malnourished baby girl, clinging to life. When they arrived, their Arabic translator told Miss Trasher that the old woman then holding the baby (its grandmother) planned to throw it into the great river Nile. At the thought of this Lillian Trasher could not leave the baby, whom she named Fareida. Thus she defied her then-mission organization and began an orphanage. By the turn of 1918 her orphanage family had grown to fifty children and eight widows. When Trasher returned to the States briefly in 1919 (Britain expelled foreigners during civil unrest) and saw the financial and prayer support to be found in the Assemblies of God, Trasher joined the missions-oriented movement. Upon returning to Egypt, she expanded her mission to include widows and the blind.

Lillian Trasher worked 50 years among Egypt's orphans and other forgotten people, from 1911 to 1961, without a furlough, including through the Nazi occupation during World War II.

== Death and legacy ==
By the time she died in 1961, the Lillian Trasher Orphanage had grown to some 1200 children. Today, the institution is entirely the responsibility of the Assemblies of God of Egypt, with 85% of its daily needs being met by donations from the Presbyterian churches of Egypt, the Soul Salvation Society, and other Egyptian church bodies.

"Mama" Lillian lies buried on her orphanage's cemetery. In accordance with Egyptian law she was buried the same day that she died. The orphanage she founded still helps people to this day.

The Episcopal Church recognizes the date of her death as a feast.

== Publications ==
- The Orphans of the Nile
