= Alexan Pasha Palace =

Palace in Asyut

Coordinates: 27.1890°N 31.1921°E

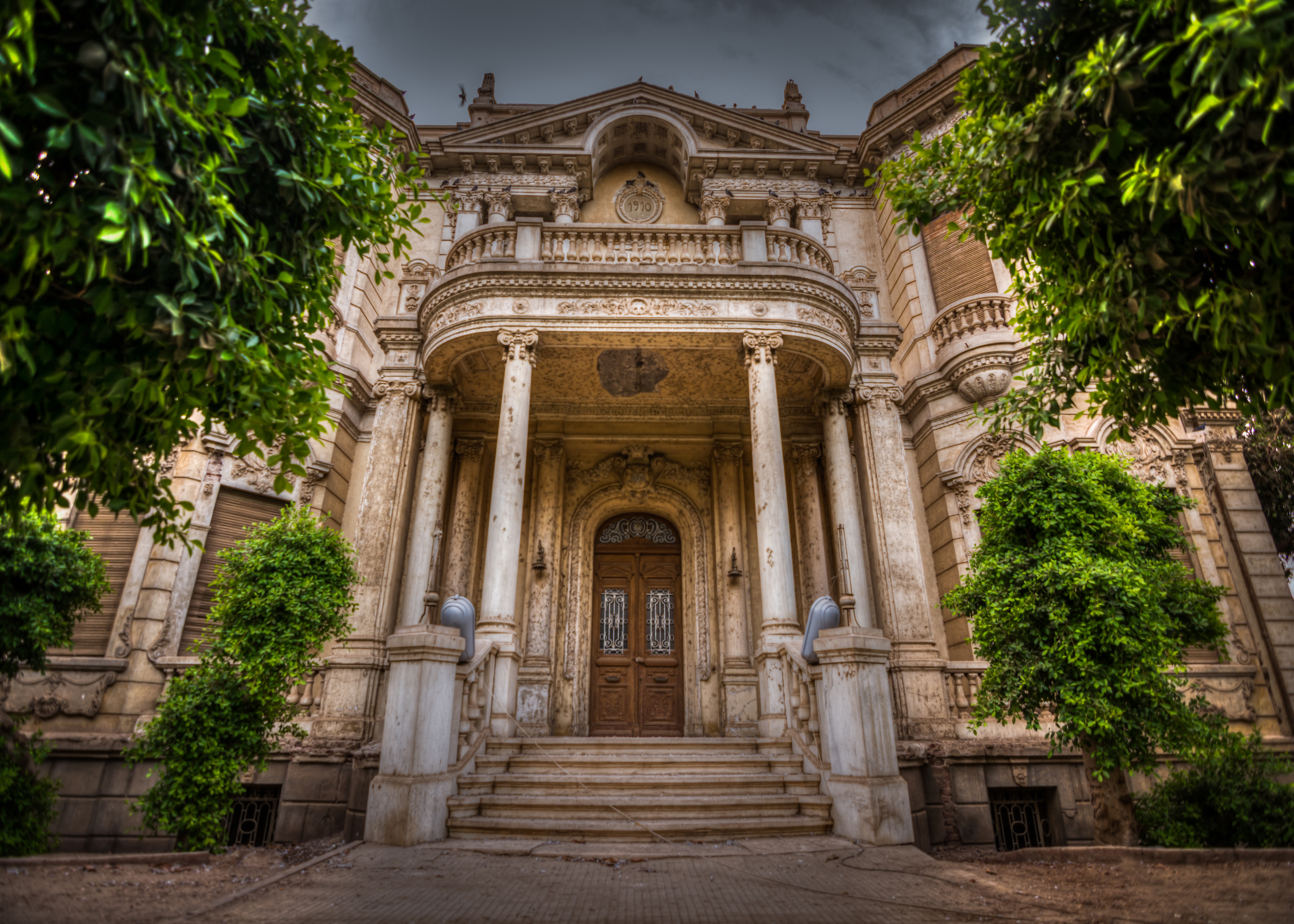
Alexan Pasha Palace

Alexan Pasha Palace was a residence of the Alexan family, a prominent lawyer and politician, in Asyut, Egypt. It was built in 1910. In 1995, the building, which was one of a few remaining residences in Asyut, was purchased by the government. The plan is to restore and convert it into a new national museum. The cost of the restoration was estimated in 2017 to be EGP 10 million.

The building was listed as one of 25 sites of the 2020 World Monuments Watch published by World Monuments Fund (WMF).

== Creation ==
It occupies an area of about 7,000 square meters, and is characterized by a unique artistic and architectural character, as artists from Italy, France and England participated in its construction.

== Description ==
The palace consists of two floors, and its facades include distinctive decorations and cornices, and semicircular arches that give the building a unique beauty.

== Incorporation ==
On December 2, 1995, a decision was issued by the Supreme Council of Antiquities to include and register the Alexan Pasha Palace in the list of Islamic monuments. The Prime Minister also issued a decision to convert the palace into a museum as a witness to the features of a “complete era” characterized by beauty, splendor, creativity, and fine art.
