= Mima, Ehime =

Town in Kitauwa District, Ehime Prefecture, Japan

Mima (三間町, Mima-chō) was a town located in Kitauwa District, Ehime Prefecture, Japan.

As of 2003, the town had an estimated population of 6,562 and a density of 115.30 persons per km^{2}. The total area was 56.91 km^{2}.

On August 1, 2005, Mima, along with the towns of Tsushima and Yoshida (all from Kitauwa District), was merged into the expanded city of Uwajima.
