= Yuny =

Ancient Egyptian scribe

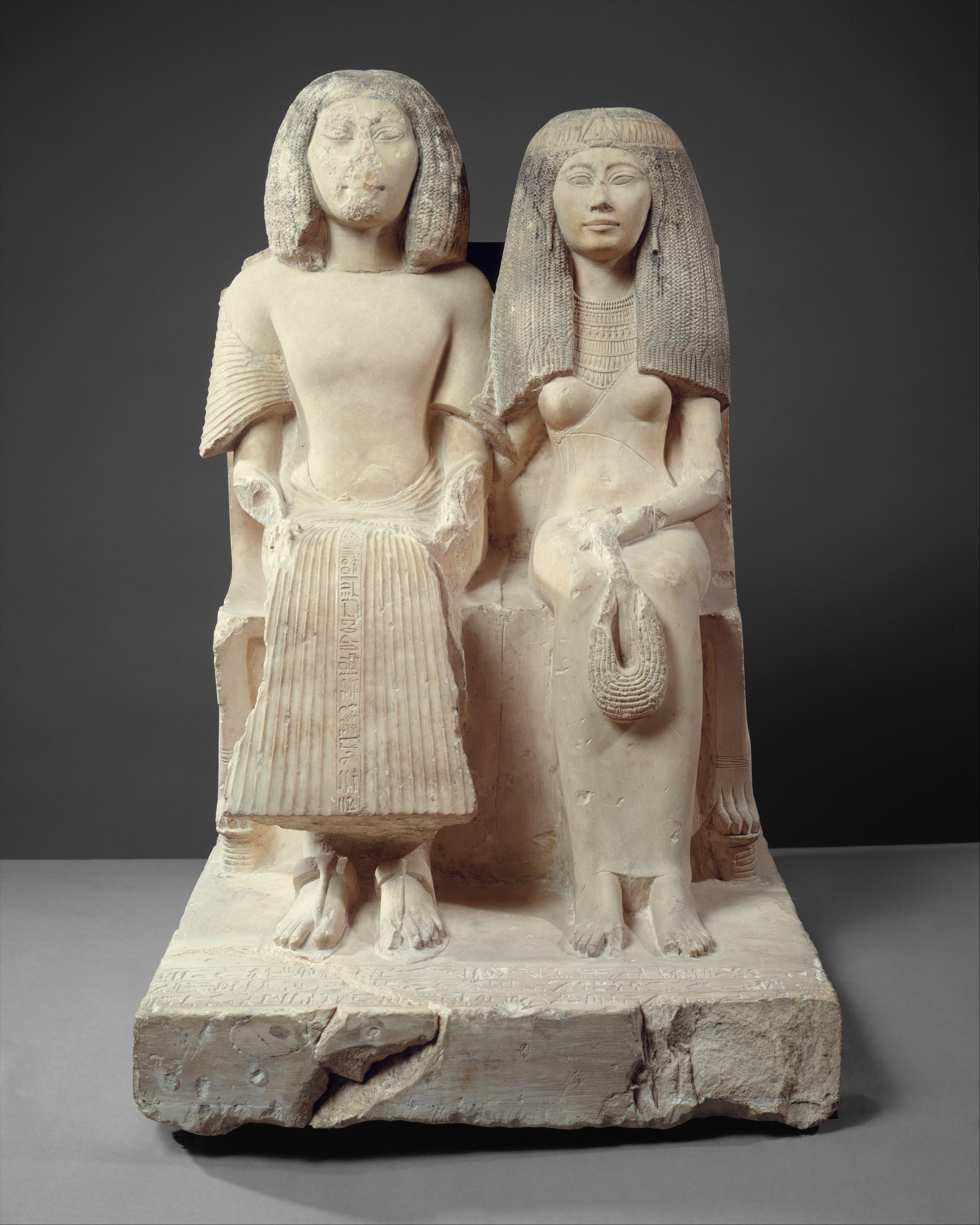
Statue of Yuny and his wife Renenutet

Yuny was also the name of a viceroy of Kush.

Yuny or Iuny was an official through the reign of Seti I, in the 19th Dynasty, serving as chief scribe of the court, the overseer of priests, and royal steward. His tomb at Deir Durunka, south of Asyut, portrays Yuny as an hereditary prince and a count. A life-sized statue of him was discovered in the tomb of his son. Another statue shows him alone offering a shrine with a figure of Osiris.

== Vice-King of Kush ==
Yunai served as stablemaster under Seti I, charioteer of his majesty, chief of the Medes before becoming the royal son of Kush during the reign of Seti I. He held several positions simultaneously.

Yunai initiated building projects in West Amarah and Aksha. He had the first blocks carved for the temples of Abu Simbel. Yunai was honored for his work by being depicted alongside Pharaoh Ramesses II on the Abu Simbel rock. After ten years of Ramesses' reign, Yunai resigned from his position in Nubia.
