= Asyut =

Asyut أسيوط zꜣwtj
- City
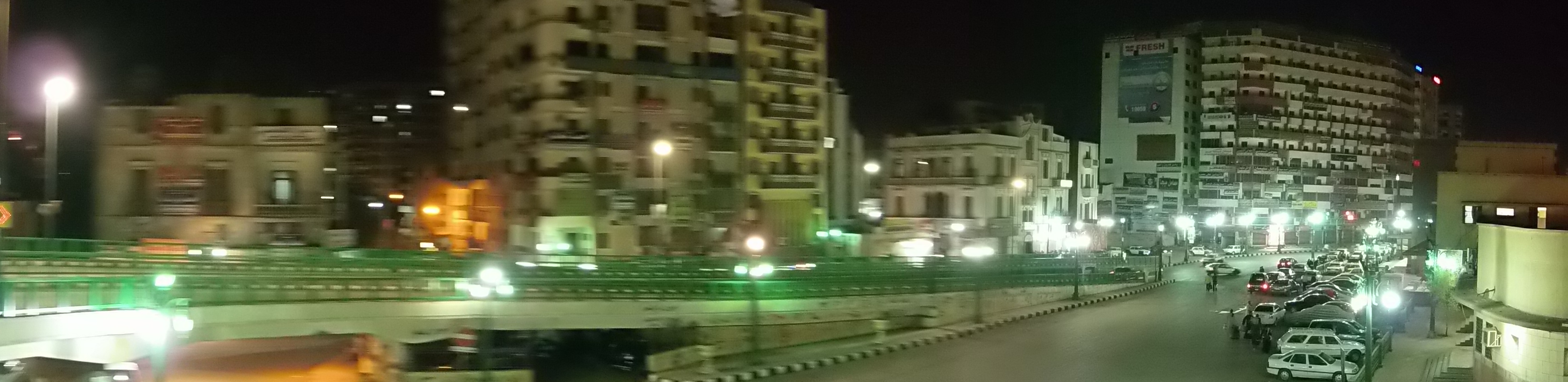
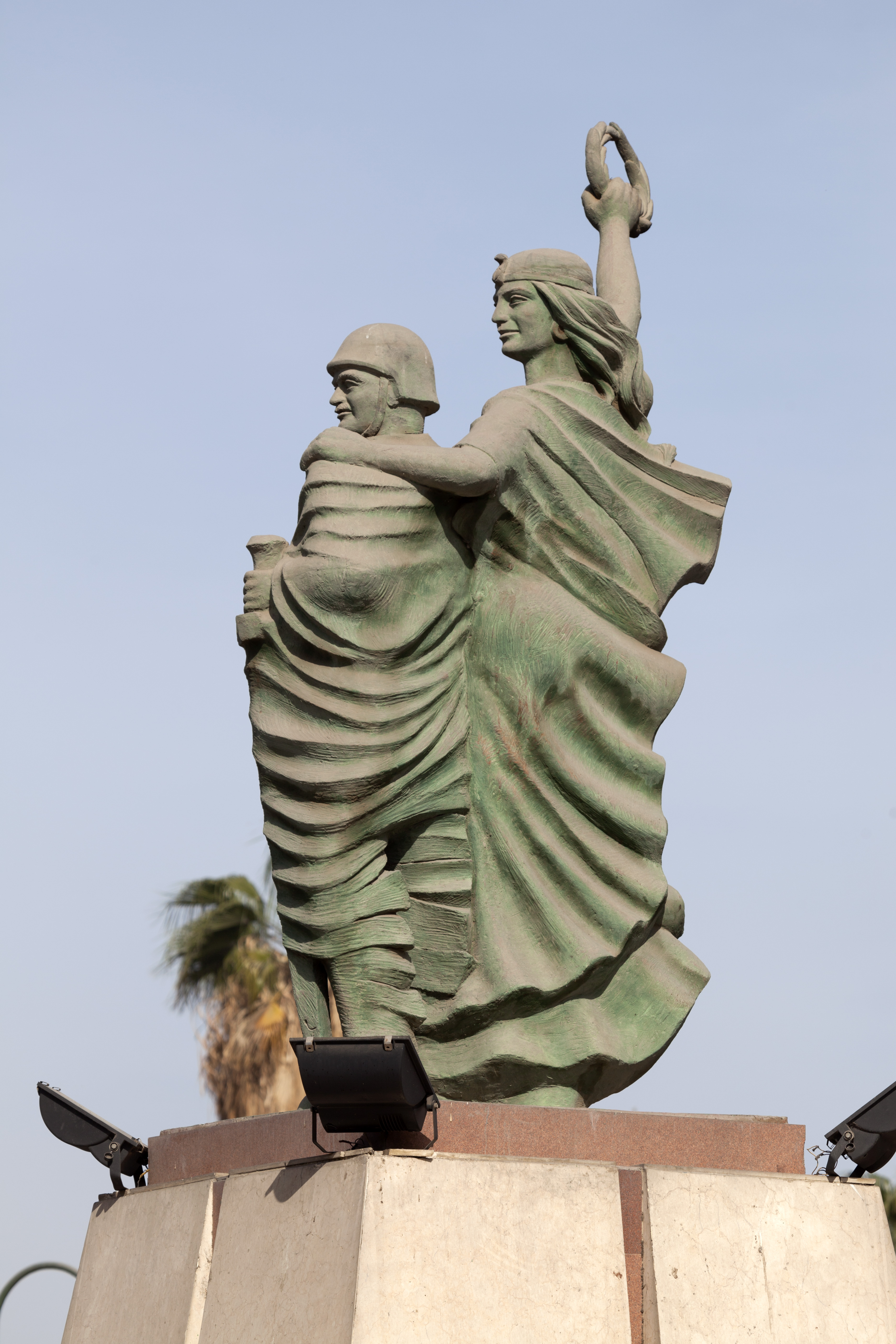
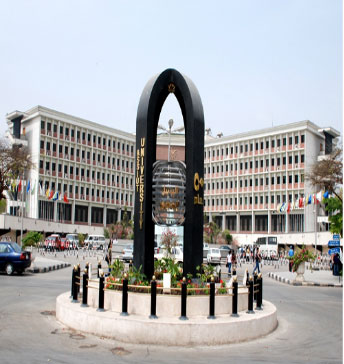
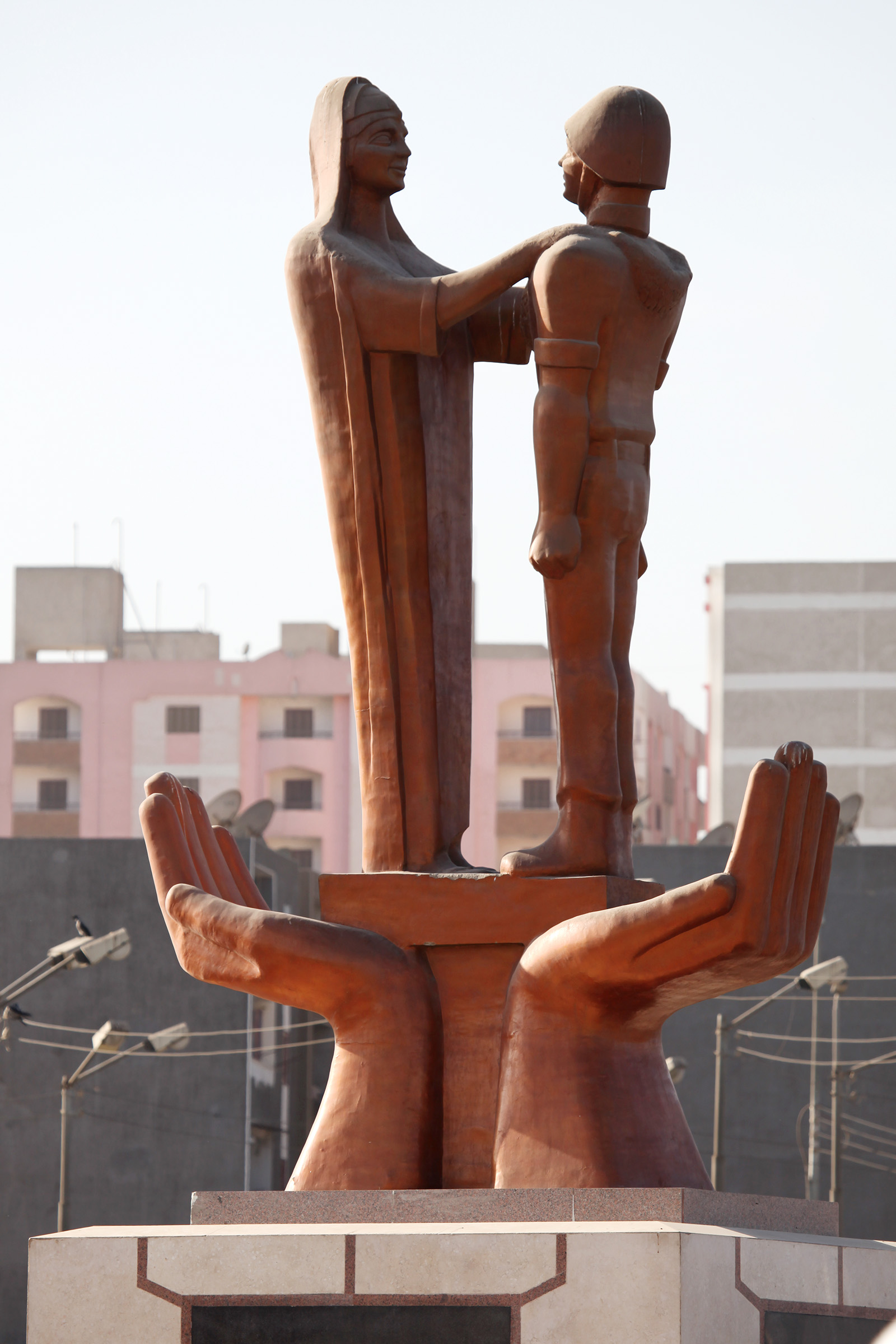
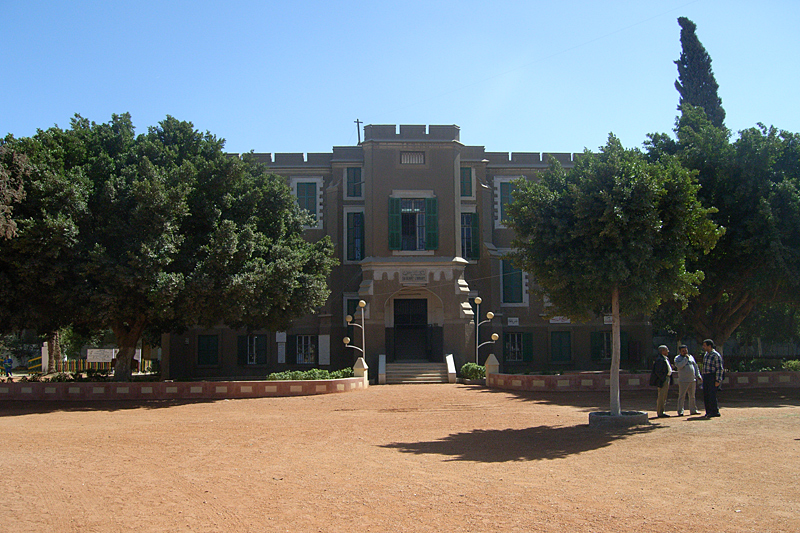
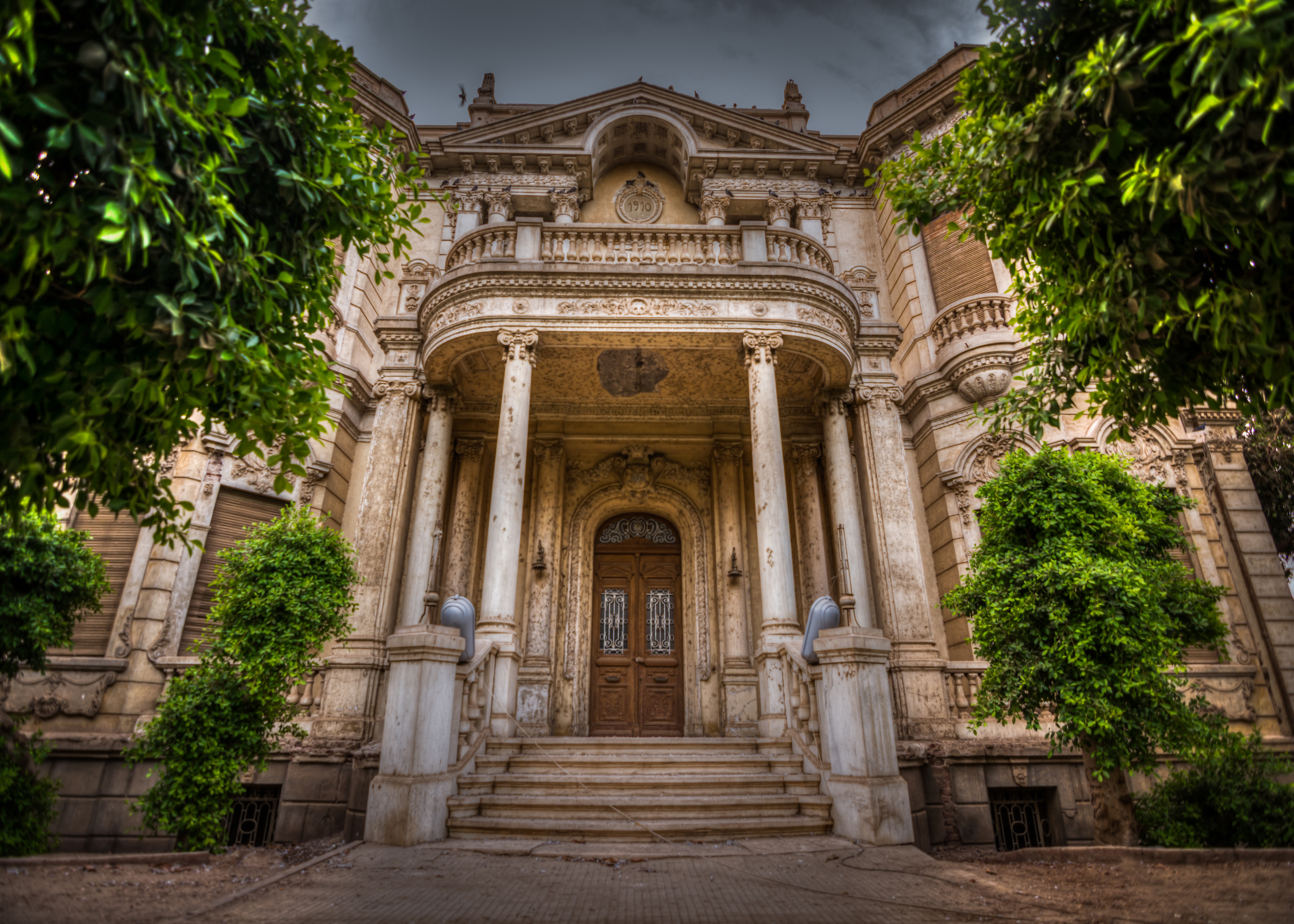
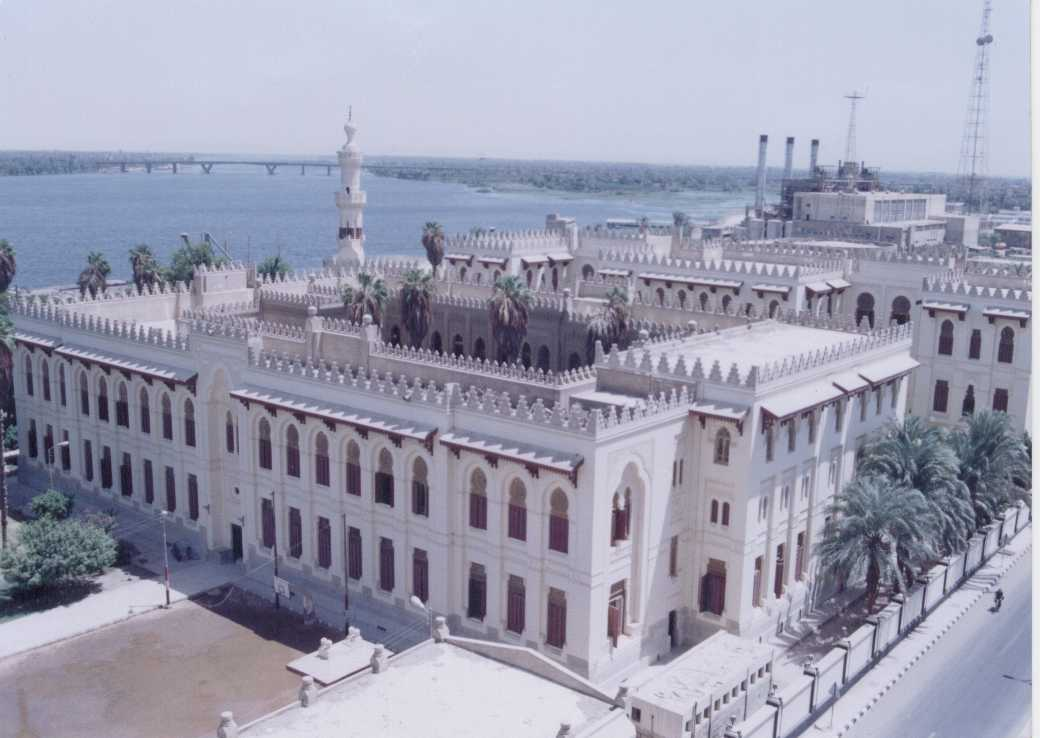
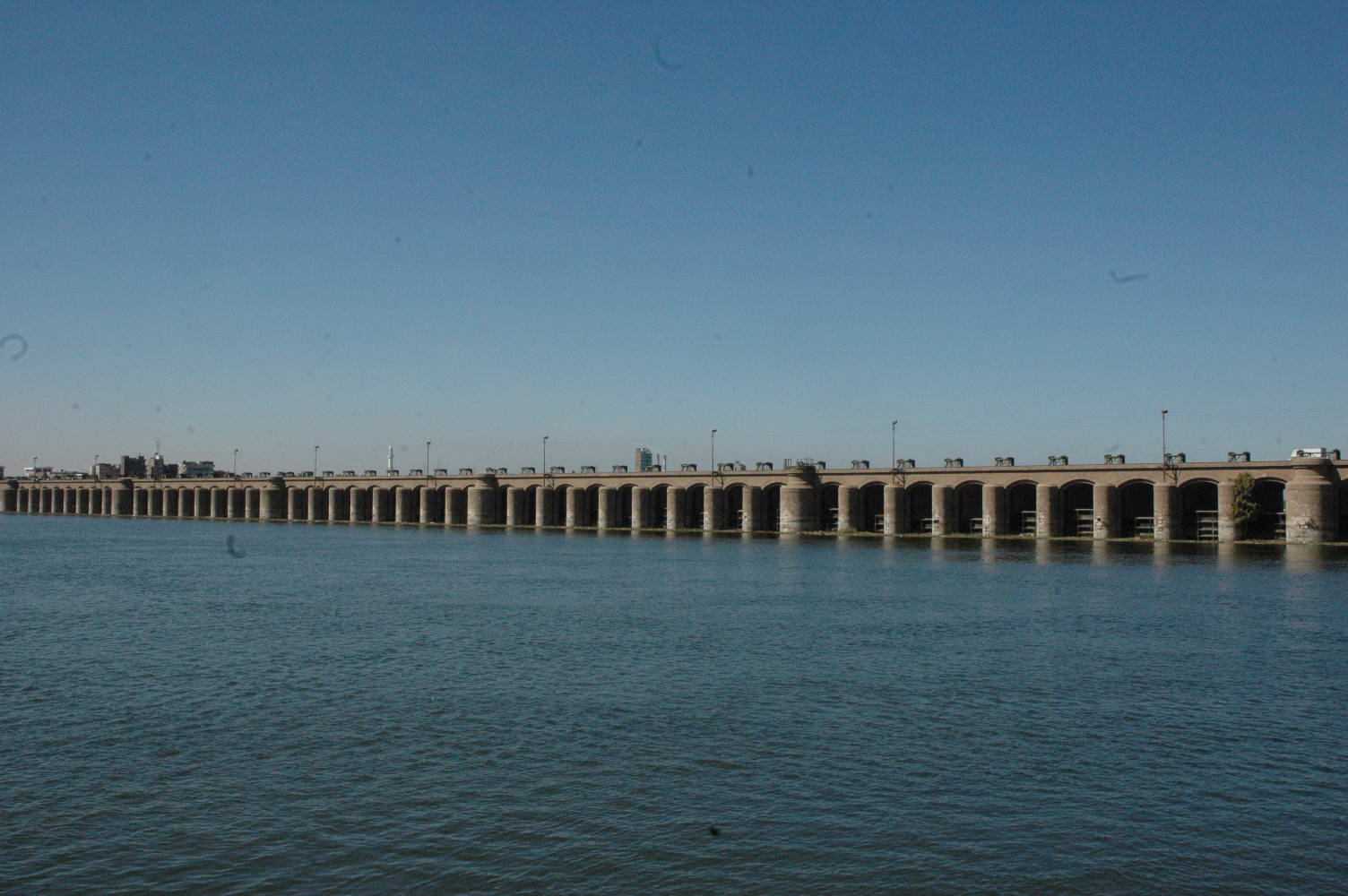
- Downtown Asyut Panoramio Omm El-Batal Assiut University South Asyut Entrance Taggart Library Alexan Pasha Palace Asyut Religious Institute Assiut Barrage

- Location of Asyut within Egypt
- Coordinates: 27°11′N 31°10′E
- Country: Egypt
- Governorate: Asyut
- Founded: 3100 BC

Area
  - Total: 26.6 km^{2} (10.3 sq mi)
- Elevation: 56 m (184 ft)

Population (2024)
  - Total: 490,000
  - Density: 18,000/km^{2} (48,000/sq mi)
- Demonym(s): Asyuti (Male, Arabic: أسيوطي) Asyutiyah (Female, Arabic: أسيوطية)

GDP (nominal, constant 2015 values)
  - Year: 2024
  - Total: $2.6 billion
  - Per capita: $5,306
- Time zone: UTC+2 (EET)
  - Summer (DST): UTC+3 (EEST)
- Area code: (+20) 88

Asyut (Note: Also spelled Assiout or Assiut.) (Asyūṭ pronounced [ʔɑsˈjuːtˤ]) is a city in Egypt. Located in Upper Egypt, it is the capital of the modern Asyut Governorate in Egypt. It was built close to the ancient city of the same name, which is situated nearby. The modern city is located at 27°11′00″N 31°10′00″E, while the ancient city is located at 27°10′00″N 31°08′00″E. Asyut is home to one of the largest Coptic Christian communities in the country.

== Name and etymology ==
The name of the city is derived from early Egyptian zꜣwtj (late Egyptian, Səyáwt) which became Coptic ⲥⲓⲟⲟⲩⲧ [ˈsjowt], meaning "Guardian" of the northern approach of Upper Egypt. In Graeco-Roman Egypt, it was called Lycopolis or Lykopolis (Greek: Λυκόπολις, "ἡ Λύκων πόλις"), ('wolf city') Lycon, or Lyco.

After the Islamic conquest of Egypt, the Arabs retained the name "Syout," which appears in works such as Al-Masalik by Ibn Khordadbeh and Al-Mukhtar by Al-Qudā‘ī. Later, the name was modified to "Asyut," which is found in Kitāb al-Buldān by Al-Ya‘qūbī, who described it as “one of the principal cities of Upper Egypt, where crimson carpets resembling Armenian ones are produced,” and in Nuzhat al-Mushtāq as well as Mu‘jam al-Buldān by Yāqūt al-Hamawī, who wrote: “A city in western Egypt on the Nile, it is a large and noble city,” and cited Al-Hasan ibn Ibrahim al-Miṣrī: “It produces Armenian and triangular Debequi fabrics and all kinds of sugar, found in every Islamic and pre-Islamic town; its quince orchards surpass every other place in quantity, and opium is also produced there.” Ibn ‘Abd al-Haqq mentioned it as Asyut, while noting its district (kūra) under the name Syout, and it is also referred to as Asyut in Subh al-A‘shā and in Qawānīn Ibn Mammātī. ‘Alī Pasha Mubārak recorded both names, Syout and Asyut, noting that according to the French, the city in their time was mostly built of mudbrick with some fired brick, had solid mosques, grand baths, and six olive oil presses. Its market contained numerous shops, and along the Nile-side gardens there were sycamores and palm trees. Most of its trade at that time consisted of linen garments, natron, pottery vessels, and opium. Similarly, Muḥammad Amīn al-Khānjī mentioned some of the city’s commercial buildings.

== History ==
=== Bronze Age ===
==== Old Kingdom period ====
Ancient Asyut was the capital of the Thirteenth Nome of Upper Egypt around 3100 BC. It was located on the western bank of the Nile. The two most prominent gods of ancient Egyptian Asyut were Anubis and Wepwawet, both funerary deities.

==== First Intermediate period ====
During the First Intermediate Period, the rulers of "Zawty" (Khety I, Tefibi, and Khety II) were supporters of the Herakleopolitan kings, of whose domain the Nome formed the southern limits. The conflict between this Nome and the southern Nomes under the rule of the Eleventh Dynasty ended with the victory of Thebes and the decline of Asyut's importance.

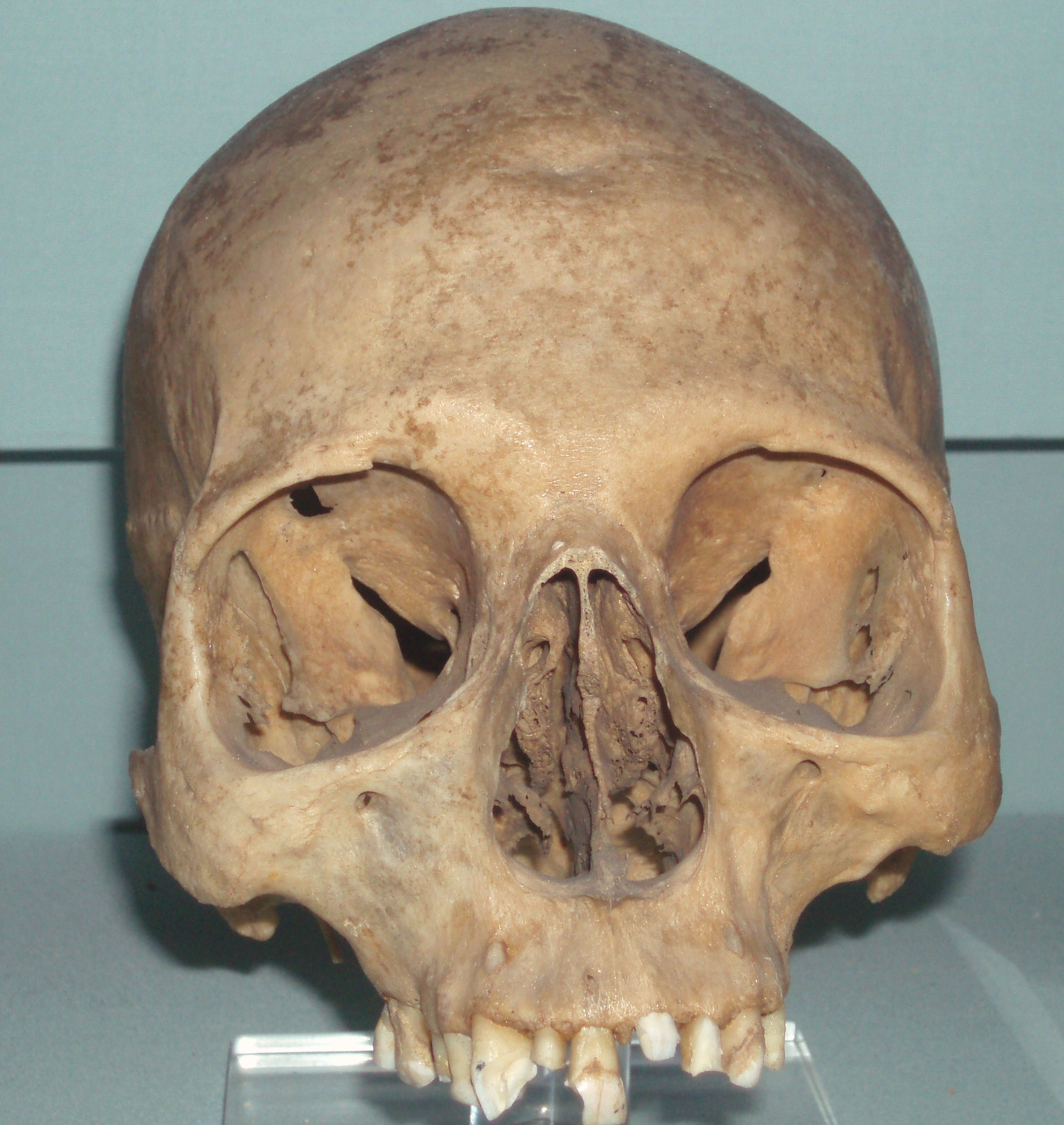
Skull of Khety from Asyut, 1950 BCE.

==== New Kingdom period ====
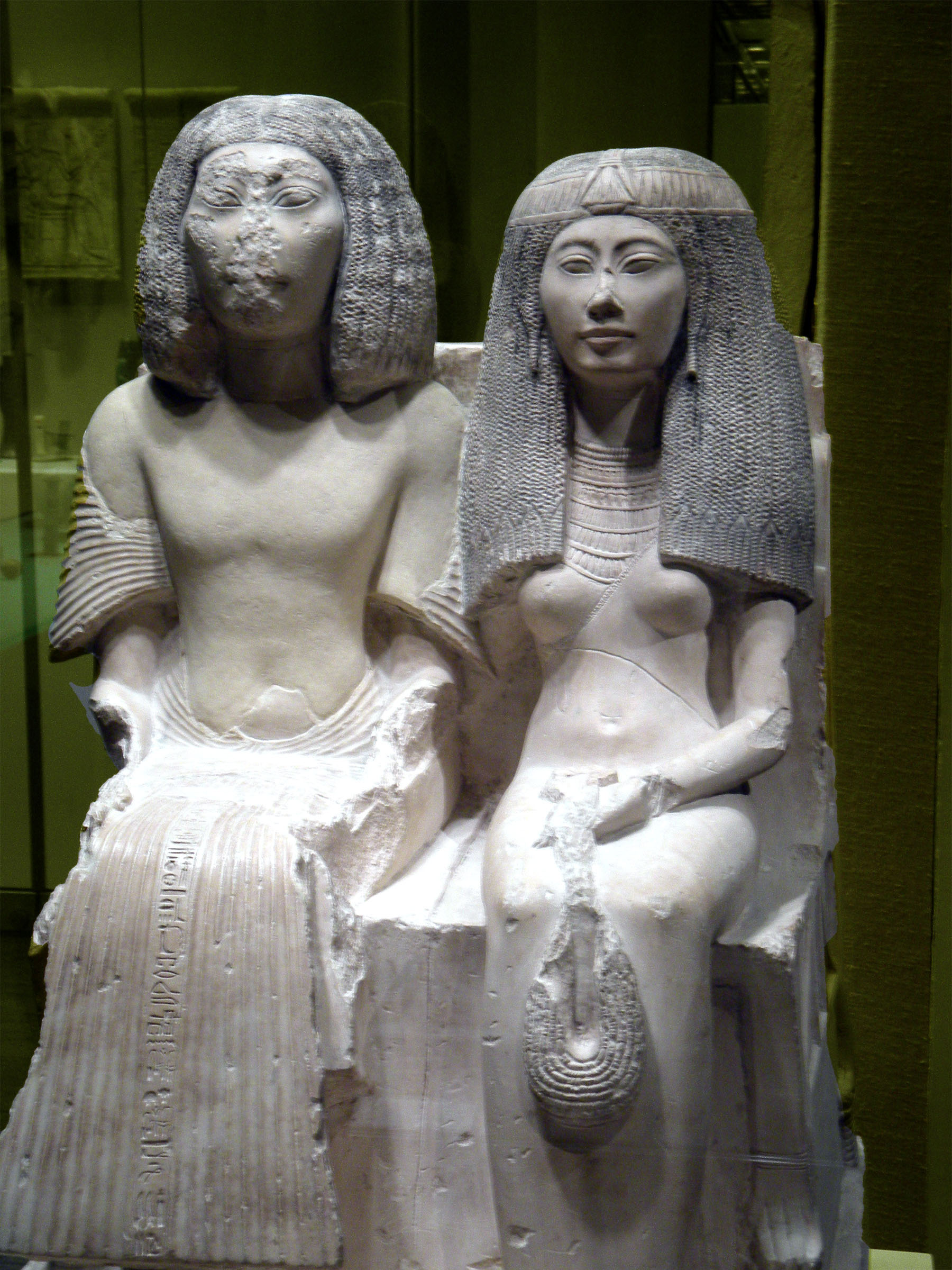
Statue of the chief royal scribe Yuny of Asyut and his wife Renenutet, 1290–1270 BCE early Dynasty 19.

In the 19th Dynasty, a statue of the chief royal scribe Yuny of Asyut is known. Other ancient Egyptian monuments discovered in Asyut include; the Asyut necropolis (west of the modern city), tombs which date to dynasties Nine, Ten and Twelve, and the Ramessid tombs of Siese and Amenhotep.

=== Classical Age ===
Lycopolis (Lycopolites Nome) has no remarkable ruins, but in the excavated chambers of the adjacent rocks mummies of wolves have been found, confirming the origin of its name, as well as a tradition preserved by Diodorus Siculus, to the effect that an Ethiopian army, invading Egypt, was repelled beyond the city of Elephantine by packs of wolves. Osiris was worshipped under the symbol of a wolf at Lycopolis. According to a myth, he had come "from the shades" as a wolf to aid Isis and Horus in their combat with Typhon.

O34 G39 w t O49
Asyut, transliterated 'sꜣwt'
in hieroglyphs
Era: 1st Intermediate Period
(2181–2055 BC)

In Graeco-Roman times, there was a distinct dialect of Coptic spoken in Asyut, known as "Lycopolitan", after the Greek name for the city. Lesser-used names for this dialect are "Sub-Akhmimic" and "Assiutic".

=== Middle Ages ===
In the Christian era, Asyut became the site of various monasteries and churches. On Gebel Asyut, for example, the ruins of two monasteries are partially preserved. A large Byzantine Treasure was discovered near the city in the early twentieth century and is now dispersed amongst a number of museums in the West. The hoard is composed of some of the most elaborate jewellery to survive from late antiquity.

Asyut was at the end of the 40 Day Road that connected the city to Darfur through the Selima and Kharga Oases. The history of the road, known by local herders as Darb al-Arba'in, goes back over 700 years. It was used as a pathway for great caravans of up to 12,000 camels at its peak in the 14th century.

== Modern Asyut ==
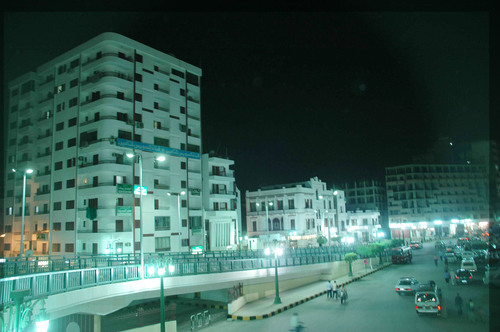
Downtown Asyut

Today, the city of Asyut has around 528,000 inhabitants. It is the Egyptian city with one of the highest Coptic Christian concentrations, making up approximately 50% of the city's population. It is also home to the Assiut University, one of the largest universities in Egypt, the Assiut Barrage, and the Lillian Trasher Orphanage.

The city is one of the only cities in the world that still makes silver appliqué-work shawls and is home to a large textile industry. The city also produces fine pottery, inlaid woodwork, and rugs.

Asyut is the terminus of the Ras Shukheir-Asyut oil pipeline, the terminus of the Cairo-Asyut gas pipeline and the beginning of the proposed Asyut-Qena gas pipeline, the last two being part of the Nile Valley Gas Company Pipeline Project. Asyut sits next to the Asyut Dam across the Nile river in the neighboring port of Al-Hamra. The dam was built in 1902 and a hydroelectric plant was added in the 1980s.

=== Coptic Catholic Eparchy ===
On 10 August 1947, a Coptic Catholic eparchy (Eastern Catholic Diocese) of Assiut (or Lycopolis) was established on southern Egyptian territory split off from the Eparchy of Luxor, each suffragan of Coptic Catholic Patriarch of Alexandria. Its episcopal see is the cathedral of the Mother of Divine Love, in Assyut.

== Geography ==
=== Climate ===
Köppen-Geiger climate classification system classifies its climate as hot desert (BWh). It is the driest city of Egypt. Luxor, Minya, Qena and Asyut have the widest difference of temperatures between days and nights of any city in Egypt, with almost 16 °C (29 °F) difference. The city of Asyut is sandwiched between two mountain ranges of about 600m height. There is also a lowering in elevation in mid Egypt, from the Mediterranean and the Red Sea. This gives the city and nearby towns and villages the similar properties of a continental climate, meaning that the city has harsh and chilly cold winter weather, and very hot but non-humid summers. During summer the temperature can exceed 42 °C (108 °F). Yet, in winter Asyut gets below 0 °C (32 °F) temperatures during the night and frost can easily form, while hail or snow are rare because of the low average of the city's precipitation and general low humidity.The city receives around 3741 sunshine hours per year.

The highest recorded temperature was 51 °C (124 °F), recorded on July 23, 1994, while the lowest recorded temperature was −2 °C (28 °F), recorded on January 16, 2008.

Climate data for Asyut (1991–2020 normals)
Month	Jan	Feb	Mar	Apr	May	Jun	Jul	Aug	Sep	Oct	Nov	Dec	Year
Record high °C (°F)	32.2 (90.0)	39.8 (103.6)	44.2 (111.6)	44.8 (112.6)	47.8 (118.0)	49.6 (121.3)	51.0 (123.8)	48.2 (118.8)	46.5 (115.7)	41.5 (106.7)	37.6 (99.7)	32.2 (90.0)	51.0 (123.8)
Mean daily maximum °C (°F)	19.3 (66.7)	21.8 (71.2)	25.8 (78.4)	31.4 (88.5)	35.5 (95.9)	37.5 (99.5)	37.7 (99.9)	37.6 (99.7)	35.2 (95.4)	31.6 (88.9)	25.9 (78.6)	21.1 (70.0)	30.2 (86.4)
Daily mean °C (°F)	12.3 (54.1)	14.3 (57.7)	18.1 (64.6)	23.0 (73.4)	27.3 (81.1)	29.8 (85.6)	30.5 (86.9)	30.4 (86.7)	28.0 (82.4)	24.6 (76.3)	18.7 (65.7)	14.2 (57.6)	22.6 (72.7)
Mean daily minimum °C (°F)	5.3 (41.5)	6.7 (44.1)	10.3 (50.5)	14.5 (58.1)	19.1 (66.4)	22.0 (71.6)	23.3 (73.9)	23.2 (73.8)	20.8 (69.4)	17.5 (63.5)	11.5 (52.7)	7.3 (45.1)	15.1 (59.2)
Record low °C (°F)	−2.0 (28.4)	0.0 (32.0)	0.7 (33.3)	6.0 (42.8)	11.0 (51.8)	15.1 (59.2)	17.9 (64.2)	17.5 (63.5)	13.8 (56.8)	10.5 (50.9)	3.0 (37.4)	0.9 (33.6)	−2.0 (28.4)
Average precipitation mm (inches)	0 (0)	0 (0)	0 (0)	0 (0)	0 (0)	0 (0)	0 (0)	0 (0)	0 (0)	0 (0)	0 (0)	0 (0)	0 (0)
Average precipitation days (≥ 1.0 mm)	0.0	0.0	0.0	0.0	0.0	0.0	0.0	0.0	0.0	0.0	0.0	0.0	0.0
Average relative humidity (%)	52	44	38	30	25	26	31	35	37	41	47	52	38.2
Mean daily sunshine hours	8.7	9.3	9.5	10.4	11.4	12.3	12.1	11.7	10.7	9.8	8.8	8.3	10.2
Source 1: NOAA World Meteorological Organization
Source 2: Weather2Travel for sunshine

== Culture ==
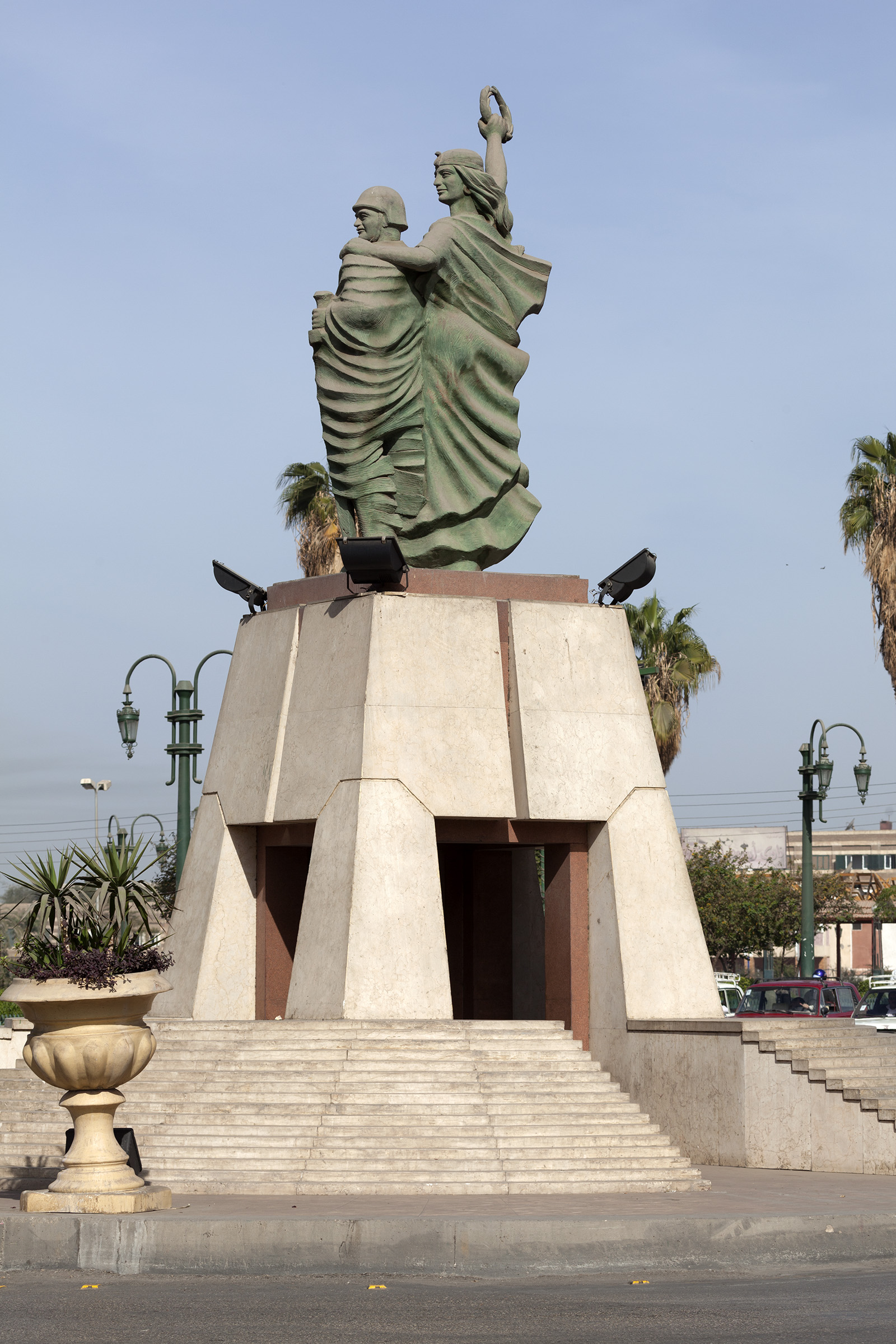
Mother of Champions monument in War and Peace Square

The Alexan Pasha Palace was constructed in 1910 as a riverside residence of a local aristocratic family. It remained in possession of the family until 1995 when it was sold to the state. There are plans to restore the mansion and turn it into a museum.

== Transport ==
Asyut is linked to Giza and northern cities by the road of Asyut western desert, eastern desert road and rural road, which also connects it to the railways. Also the railway station is linked to Alexandria in the north and Aswan in the south. In 1974, Assiut Airport was opened, and it was renewed and expanded with a new terminal in 2011.

== Notable people ==
- Plotinus, Neoplatonic philosopher 204 or 205 – 270 CE
- Coluthus, 5th century Greek poet
- Pope Shenouda III, Pope and Patriarch of the Egyptian Orthodox Church in Egypt and All Middle East
- Thutmose Kamel Gabrial, an Egyptian military pilot who was killed in action during the 1948 Palestine War.
- Gamal Abdel Nasser, second Egyptian president
- Samir Ghanem, comedian, singer, and entertainer
- Ahmed Lutfi el-Sayed, Egyptian nationalist
- Melitius of Lycopolis, founder of the Melitians.
- al-Suyuti, Sunni Muslim theologian who died in 1505
- Ali El-Araby, footballer
- Umar Makram, revolutionary and noble
- Regina Khayatt, feminist, educator, philanthropist, suffragist, and temperance worker

== Foreign Relations ==
Asyut has one twin city:

- Iaşi, Romania

== See also ==
- List of ancient Egyptian towns and cities
- List of cities and towns in Egypt
- Tulle bi telli

== Bibliography ==
- Loprieno, Antonio: Ancient Egyptian: A Linguistic Introduction, Oxford University Press 1996. ISBN 0-521-44849-2
- Baines & Malek Cultural Atlas of Ancient Egypt, 2000. ISBN 0-8160-4036-2
- Kahl, Jochem: "Ancient Asyut: The first Synthesis after Three Hundred Years of Research", The Asyut Project vol. I. Wiesbaden 2008. ISBN 978-3-447-05666-3
