= Yoshida, Ehime =

Town in Kitauwa District, Ehime Prefecture, Japan

Yoshida (吉田町, Yoshida-chō) was a town located in Kitauwa District, Ehime Prefecture, Japan.

As of 2003, the town had an estimated population of 12,418 and a density of 257.85 persons per km^{2}. The total area was 48.16 km^{2}.

On August 1, 2005, Yoshida, along with the towns of Mima and Tsushima (all from Kitauwa District), was merged into the expanded city of Uwajima.
