= Thutmose Kamel Gabrial =

Egyptian military pilot (1924–1948)

- تحتمس كامل غبريال Ⲑⲱⲟⲩⲧ ⲙⲟⲥⲓ Ⲕⲏⲙⲗ ⲅⲉⲃⲣⲓⲁⲗ
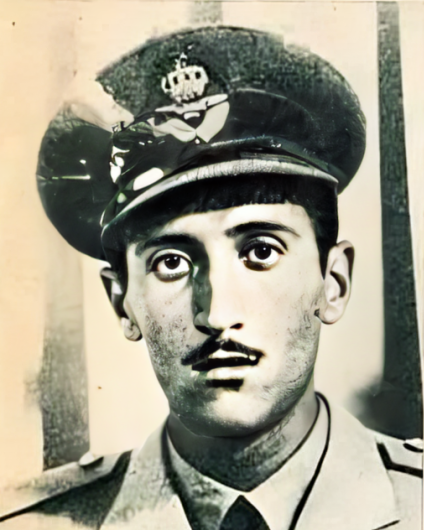
- Born: 1924; Asyut, Asyut Governorate, Kingdom of Egypt
- Died: 22 May 1948 (aged 24); Haifa, Israel
- Cause of death: Killed in action
- Education: Egyptian Military College
- Military career
- Allegiance: Kingdom of Egypt
- Branch: Royal Egyptian Air Force
- Service years: 1948
- Conflicts: 1948 Palestine War

Thutmose Kamel Gabrial (Egyptian Arabic: تحتمس كامل غبريال; Lycopolitan (Asyutic) Coptic: Ⲑⲱⲟⲩⲧ ⲙⲟⲥⲓ Ⲕⲏⲙⲗ ⲅⲉⲃⲣⲓⲁⲗ) was an Egyptian military pilot. He was born in Asyut in 1924 and his father was a staff officer in the Sixth Infantry Battalion. He was named after the pharaoh of Egypt, Thutmose III. He grew up in a family that combined military upbringing and spiritual upbringing.

He graduated from the Military College in 1948, as the Air College had not been established yet. He joined the Royal Egyptian Air Force and was one of the first pilots to go to the battlefield in the war with Israel on May 16, 1948.

He raided and bombed the port of Tel Aviv. The next day, he bombed the army camps south of Tel Aviv. The third day, he bombed a power station south of Tel Aviv. On May 20, he met with his family, which was the last meeting. On the 22nd, he raided Haifa Airport with his friend Muharram, and it was a surprise that 20 British planes appeared. The Jerusalem Post newspaper reported that a major battle took place that ended with the martyrdom of the fighter Thutmose Kamel. The Ministry of War placed a large plaque for him in the Military Museum. King Farouk also presented a gold medal to his mother. After the 23 July Revolution of 1952, Field Marshal Abdel Hakim Amer ordered an exceptional pension for his mother in recognition of the role of the hero Thutmose Kamel Gabrial.
