= Shishi Bunroku =

Japanese writer

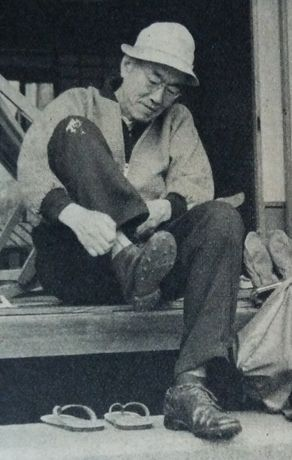
Shishi Bunroku (1954)

Bunroku Shishi (獅子文六, Shishi Bunroku, 1 July 1893 – 13 December 1969), real name Toyoo Iwata (岩田豊雄, Iwata Toyoo), was a Japanese novelist, playwright and director of the Bungakuza theatre company.

Shishi was born in Yokohama. In 1922 he traveled to France to study modern French theater, and worked in the atelier of Jacques Copeau.

== Selected books ==
- Ecchan, (Little Etsuko, 1936)
- Ten'ya Wan'ya (Chaos, 1949)
- Jiyū Gakkō, (1950) Published in English in 2006 as School of Freedom by Lynne E. Riggs, ISBN 1-929280-40-8.
- Yassa Mossa, (Helter-Skelter, 1952)
- Musume to Watashi, (My Daughter And I, 1956, was made into both a TV-series and a movie)
- Hakoneyama, (Mount Hakone, 1962)
