= Senoo Station =

Railway station in Okayama, Japan

Senoo Station 妹尾駅
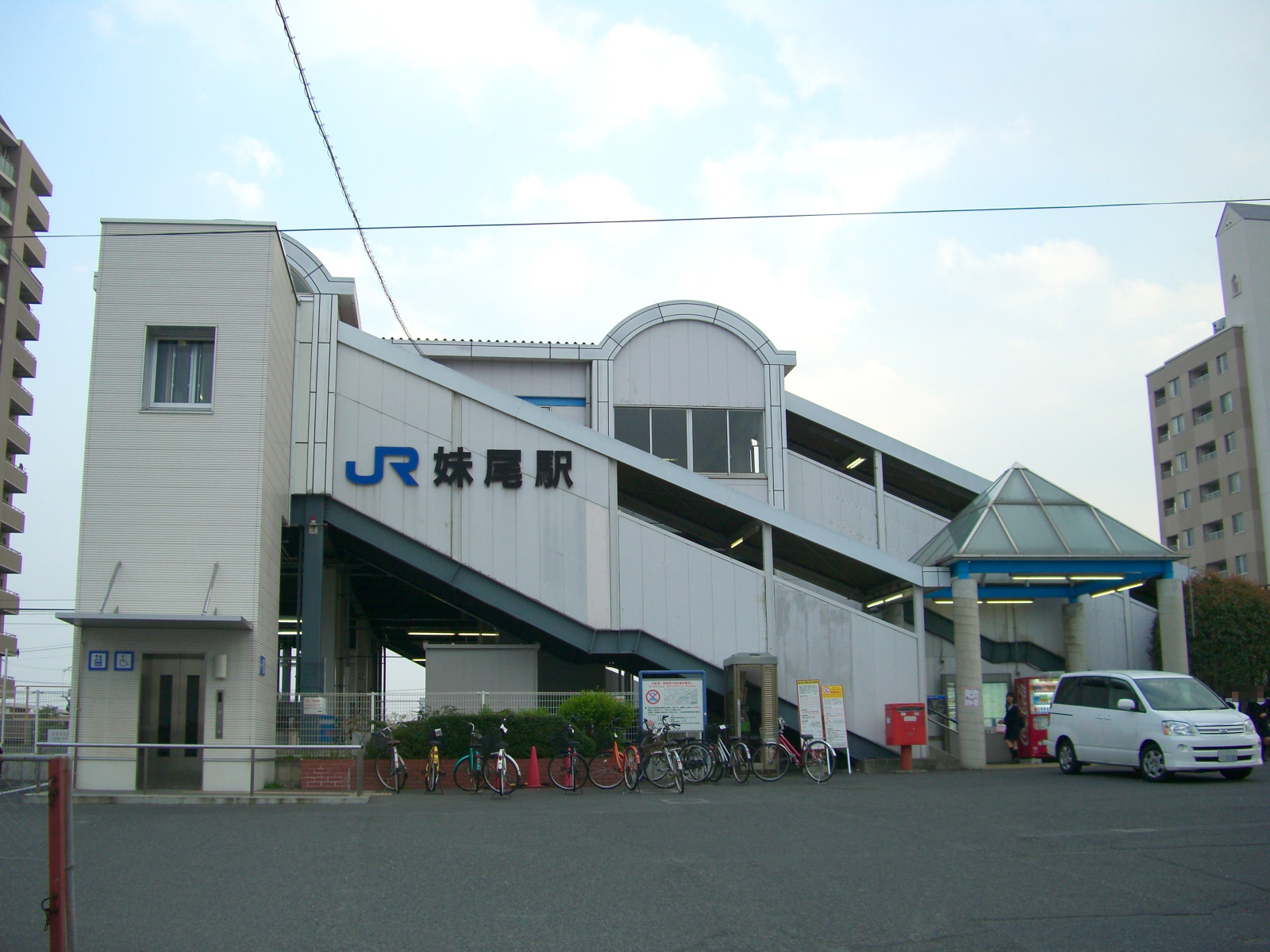
- Senoo Station, April 2007

General information
- Location: 145 Higashiuni, Minami-ku, Okayama-shi, Okayama-ken 701-0211; Japan
- Coordinates: 34°36′30.1″N 133°52′17.41″E
- Owner: West Japan Railway Company
- Operator: West Japan Railway Company
- Lines: L Uno Line; M Seto-Ōhashi Line
- Distance: 8.3 km (5.2 miles) from Okayama
- Platforms: 2 side platforms
- Tracks: 2
- Connections: Bus stop

Other information
- Status: Staffed ( Midori no Madoguchi )
- Station code: JR-L04; JR-M04
- Website: Official website

History
- Opened: January 1, 1939

Passengers
- FY2019: 3163 daily

Services
Uno Line
Limited Express Uzushio: Does not stop at this station
Bizen-Nishiichi	Rapid Marine Liner	Hayashima
Bizen-Nishiichi	Local	Bitchū-Mishima
Location
- Location within Okayama Prefecture Location within Japan

Senoo Station (妹尾駅, Senoo-eki) is a passenger railway station located in Minami-ku of the city of Okayama, Okayama Prefecture, Japan. It is operated by the West Japan Railway Company (JR West).

== Lines ==
Senoo Station is served by the JR Uno Line, and is located 8.3 kilometers from the terminus of the line at Okayama. It is also served by the Seto-Ōhashi Line and is 63.5 kilometers from the terminus of that line at Takamatsu.

== Station layout ==
The station consists of a two opposed ground-level side platforms, connected by an elevated station building. The station has a Midori no Madoguchi staffed ticket office.

=== Platforms ===
1	■ L Uno Line	for Okayama
1	■ M Seto-Ōhashi Line	for Okayama
2	■ L Uno Line	for Kojima, Uno and Takamatsu
2	■ M Seto-Ōhashi Line	for Kojima, Uno, Takamatsu

== History ==
Senoo Station was opened on 12 June 1910. With the privatization of Japanese National Railways (JNR) on 1 April 1987, the station came under the control of JR West.

== Passenger statistics ==
In fiscal 2019, the station was used by an average of 3163 passengers daily

== Surrounding area ==
- Okayama Municipal Seno Hospital
- Okayama Municipal Senoo Elementary School
- Okayama Municipal Toka Elementary School

== See also ==
- List of railway stations in Japan
