= Bizen-Nishiichi Station =

Railway station in Okayama, Japan

Bizen-Nishiichi Station 備前西市駅
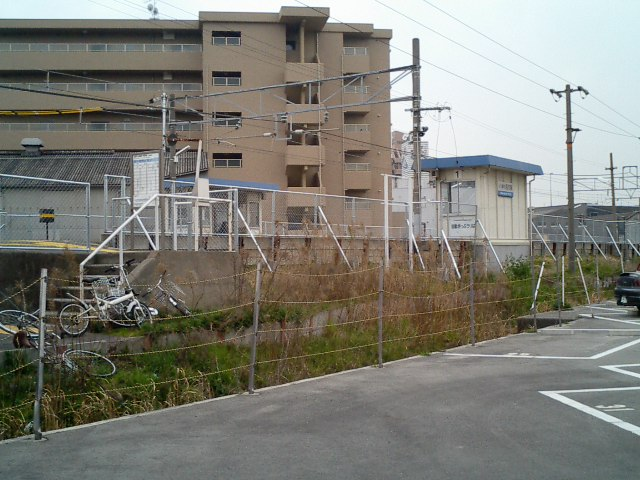
- Bizen-Nishiichi Station, April 2006

General information
- Location: 457-4 Nishiichi, Minami-ku, Okayama-shi, Okayama-ken 700-0953; Japan
- Coordinates: 34°37′54.56″N 133°54′0.65″E
- Owner: West Japan Railway Company
- Operator: West Japan Railway Company
- Lines: L Uno Line; M Seto-Ōhashi Line
- Distance: 4.5 km (2.8 miles) from Okayama
- Platforms: 2 side platforms
- Tracks: 2
- Connections: Bus stop

Other information
- Status: Unstaffed
- Station code: JR-L03; JR-M03
- Website: Official website

History
- Opened: January 1, 1939

Passengers
- FY2019: 1813 daily

Services
Uno Line
Limited Express Uzushio: Does not stop at this station
Ōmoto	Rapid Marine Liner	Senoo
Ōmoto	Local	Senoo
Location
- Location within Okayama Prefecture Location within Japan

Bizen-Nishiichi Station (備前西市駅, Bizen-Nishiichi-eki) is a passenger railway station located in Minami-ku of the city of Okayama, Okayama Prefecture, Japan. It is operated by the West Japan Railway Company (JR West).

== Lines ==
Bizen-Nishiichi Station is served by the JR Uno Line, and is located 4.5 kilometers from the terminus of the line at Okayama. It is also served by the Seto-Ōhashi Line and is 67.3 kilometers from the terminus of that line at Takamatsu.

== Station layout ==
The station consists of a two opposed ground-level side platforms, connected by a footbridge. The station is unattended.

=== Platforms ===
1	■ L Uno Line	for Okayama
1	■ M Seto-Ōhashi Line	for Okayama
2	■ L Uno Line	for Kojima, Uno and Takamatsu
2	■ M Seto-Ōhashi Line	for Kojima, Uno, Takamatsu

== History ==
Bizen-Nishiichi Station was opened on 1 January 1939. The station was closed from 1 November 1940 to 14 November 1950. On 25 September 1968, the station was relocated 250 meters in the direction of Uno Station. With the privatization of Japanese National Railways (JNR) on 1 April 1987, the station came under the control of JR West.

== Passenger statistics ==
In fiscal 2019, the station was used by an average of 1813 passengers daily

== Surrounding area ==
- Okayama Municipal Houmei Elementary School
- Japan National Route 2

== See also ==
- List of railway stations in Japan
