= Bizen-Kataoka Station =

Railway station in Tamano, Okayama Prefecture, Japan

Bizen-Kataoka Station 備前片岡駅
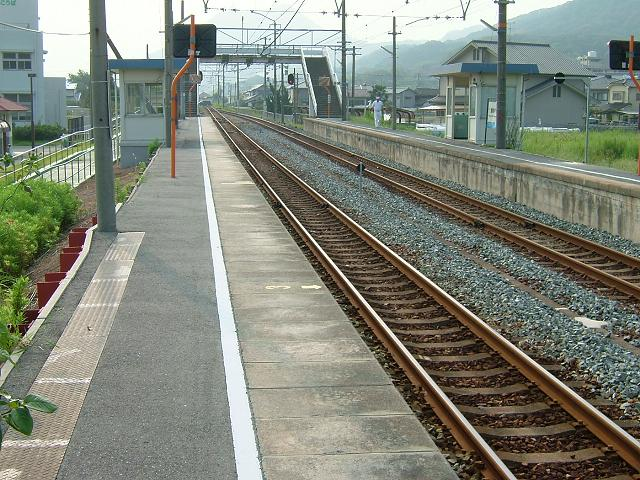
- The station platforms, September 2005

General information
- Location: Kataoka, Minami-ku, Okayama-shi, Okayama-ken 709-1215; Japan
- Coordinates: 34°32′38″N 133°51′42″E
- Owner: West Japan Railway Company
- Operator: West Japan Railway Company
- Line: L Uno Line
- Distance: 20.9 km (13.0 miles) from Okayama
- Platforms: 2 side platforms
- Tracks: 2
- Connections: Bus stop

Other information
- Status: Unstaffed
- Station code: JR-L10
- Website: Official website

History
- Opened: January 1, 1939

Passengers
- FY2019: 235daily
Location
- Location within Okayama Prefecture Location within Japan

Bizen-Kataoka Station (備前片岡駅, Bizen-Kataoka-eki) is a passenger railway station located in Minami-ku of the city of Okayama, Okayama Prefecture, Japan. It is operated by the West Japan Railway Company (JR West).

== Lines ==
Bizen-Kataoka Station is served by the JR Uno Line, and is located 20.9 kilometers from the terminus of the line at Okayama and 6.0 kilometers from Chayamachi.

== Station layout ==
The station consists of two opposed ground-level side platforms connected by a footbridge. The station is unattended.

=== Platforms ===
| 1 | ■ Uno Line | for Chayamachi, Okayama |
| 2 | ■ Uno Line | for Uno |

== Adjacent stations ==
| « | Service | » |
JR West Uno Line
| Hikosaki | Local | Hazakawa |

== History ==
Bizen-Kataoka Station was opened on 1 January 1939.With the privatization of Japanese National Railways (JNR) on 1 April 1987, the station came under the control of JR West.

== Passenger statistics ==
In fiscal 2019, the station was used by an average of 235 passengers daily

== Surrounding area ==
- Okayama City Minami Ward Office Nadasaki Branch
- Okayama Municipal Nadasaki Town History and Culture Museum
- Okayama Municipal Nadazaki Elementary School
- Okayama Municipal Nadasaki Junior High School

== See also ==
- List of railway stations in Japan
