= Hazakawa Station =

Railway station in Okayama, Japan

Hazakawa Station 迫川駅
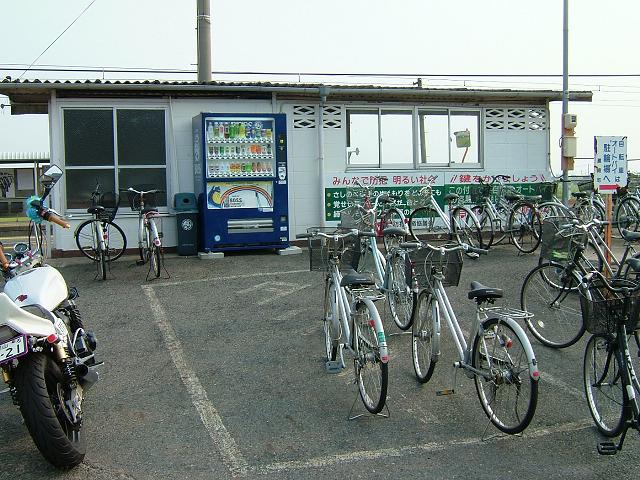
- Hazakawa Station, September 2005

General information
- Location: 237-22 Hazakawa, Minami-ku, Okayama-shi, Okayama-ken 709-1211; Japan
- Coordinates: 34°32′10.96″N 133°52′46.45″E
- Owner: West Japan Railway Company
- Operator: West Japan Railway Company
- Line: L Uno Line
- Distance: 22.8 km (14.2 miles) from Okayama
- Platforms: 2 side platforms
- Tracks: 2
- Connections: Bus stop

Other information
- Status: Unstaffed
- Station code: JR-L11
- Website: Official website

History
- Opened: June 12, 1910
- Former names: Yuga (to 1952)

Passengers
- FY2019: 207 daily
Location
- Location within Okayama Prefecture Location within Japan

Hazakawa Station (迫川駅, Hazakawa-eki) is a passenger railway station located in Minami-ku of the city of Okayama, Okayama Prefecture, Japan. It is operated by the West Japan Railway Company (JR West).

== Lines ==
Hazakawa Station is served by the JR Uno Line, and is located 22.8 kilometers from the terminus of the line at Okayama and 7.9 kilometers from Chayamachi.

== Station layout ==
The station consists of two opposed ground-level side platforms connected by a footbridge. The station is unattended.

=== Platforms ===
1	■ Uno Line	for Chayamachi, Okayama
2	■ Uno Line	for Uno

== Adjacent stations ==
«	Service	»
JR West Uno Line
Bizen-Kataoka	Local	Tsuneyama

== History ==
Hazakawa Station was opened on 12 June 1910 as Yuga Station (由加駅). It was renamed 15 November 1952. With the privatization of Japanese National Railways (JNR) on 1 April 1987, the station came under the control of JR West.

== Passenger statistics ==
In fiscal 2019, the station was used by an average of 207 passengers daily

== Surrounding area ==
- Okayama Municipal Nadasaki Elementary School Hasagawa branch school
- Japan National Route 30

== See also ==
- List of railway stations in Japan
