= Hikosaki Station =

Railway station in Tamano, Okayama Prefecture, Japan

Hikosaki Station 彦崎駅
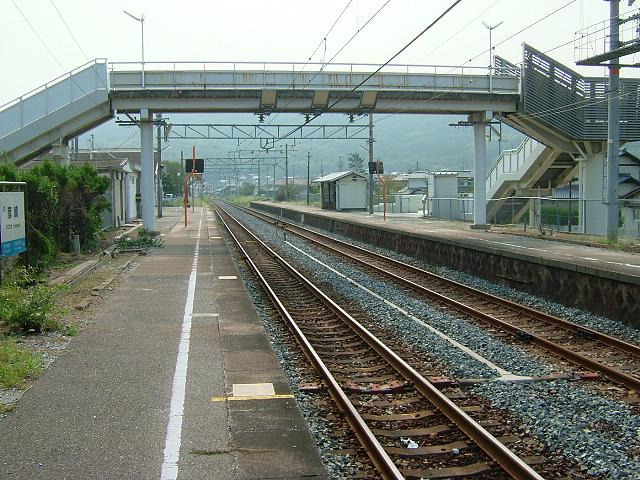
- The station platforms, September 2005

General information
- Location: 2928-1 Hikosaki, Minami-ku, Okayama-shi, Okayama-ken 709-1213; Japan
- Coordinates: 34°33′7.46″N 133°50′6.57″E
- Owner: West Japan Railway Company
- Operator: West Japan Railway Company
- Line: L Uno Line
- Distance: 18.1 km (11.2 miles) from Okayama
- Platforms: 2 side platforms
- Tracks: 2
- Connections: Bus stop

Other information
- Status: Unstaffed
- Station code: JR-L09
- Website: Official website

History
- Opened: June 12, 1910
- Former names: Ajino (to 1914)

Passengers
- FY2019: 282 daily
Location
- Location within Okayama Prefecture Location within Japan

Hikosaki Station (彦崎駅, Hikosaki-eki) is a passenger railway station located in Minami-ku of the city of Okayama, Okayama Prefecture, Japan. It is operated by the West Japan Railway Company (JR West).

== Lines ==
Hikosaki Station is served by the JR Uno Line, and is located 18.1 kilometers from the terminus of the line at Okayama and 3.2 kilometers from Chayamachi.

== Station layout ==
The station consists of two opposed ground-level side platforms connected by a footbridge. There are two entrances and exits near the center of both platforms (the front entrance and the station square rotary are on the outbound platform side). There is a waiting area on each platform. The station is unattended.

=== Platforms ===
1	■ Uno Line	for Chayamachi, Okayama
2	■ Uno Line	for Uno

== Adjacent stations ==
«	Service	»
JR West Uno Line
Chayamachi	Local	Bizen-Kataoka

== History ==
Hikosaki Station was opened on 12 June 1910 as Ajino Station (味野駅). It was renamed 1 July 1914. With the privatization of Japanese National Railways (JNR) on 1 April 1987, the station came under the control of JR West.

== Passenger statistics ==
In fiscal 2019, the station was used by an average of 282 passengers daily

== Surrounding area ==
- Hikozaki Shell Mound (National Historic Site)
- Okayama Municipal Hikozaki Elementary School

== See also ==
- List of railway stations in Japan
