= Hayashima Station =

Railway station in Hayashima, Okayama Prefecture, Japan

Hayashima Station 早島駅
- Hayashima Station in August 2026

General information
- Location: 589-2 Maegata, Hayashima-cho, Tsukubo-gun, Okayama-ken 701-0303; Japan
- Coordinates: 34°36′8.08″N 133°49′59.77″E
- Owner: West Japan Railway Company
- Operator: West Japan Railway Company
- Lines: L Uno Line; M Seto-Ōhashi Line
- Distance: 11.9 km (7.4 miles) from Okayama
- Platforms: 2 side platforms
- Tracks: 2
- Connections: Bus stop

Other information
- Status: Unstaffed
- Station code: JR-L06; JR-M06
- Website: Official website

History
- Opened: June 12, 1910

Passengers
- FY2019: 1217 daily
Location
- Location within Okayama Prefecture Location within Japan

Hayashima Station (早島駅, Hayashima-eki) is a passenger railway station located in the town of Hayashima, Okayama, Japan. It is operated by the West Japan Railway Company (JR West).

== Lines ==
Hayashima Station is served by the JR Uno Line, and is located 11.9 kilometers from the terminus of the line at Okayama. It is also served by the Seto-Ōhashi Line and is 59.9 kilometers from the terminus of that line at Takamatsu.

== Station layout ==
The station consists of two opposed ground-level side platforms, connected by a footbridge. The station is unattended.

=== Platforms ===
1	■ L Uno Line	for Okayama
1	■ M Seto-Ōhashi Line	for Okayama
2	■ L Uno Line	for Kojima, Uno and Takamatsu
2	■ M Seto-Ōhashi Line	for Kojima, Uno, Takamatsu

== Adjacent stations ==
«	Service	»
JR West
Uno Line
Limited Express Uzushio: Does not stop at this station
Senoo	Rapid Marine Liner	Chayamachi
Bitchū-Mishima	Local	Kuguhara

== History ==
Hayashima Station was opened on 12 June 1910. With the privatization of the Japanese National Railways (JNR) on 1 April 1987, the station came under the control of JR West.

== Passenger statistics ==
In fiscal 2019, the station was used by an average of 1217 passengers daily.

== Surrounding area ==
- Hayashima Town Office

== See also ==
- List of railway stations in Japan
