= Hachihama Station =

Railway station in Tamano, Okayama Prefecture, Japan

Hachihama Station 八浜駅
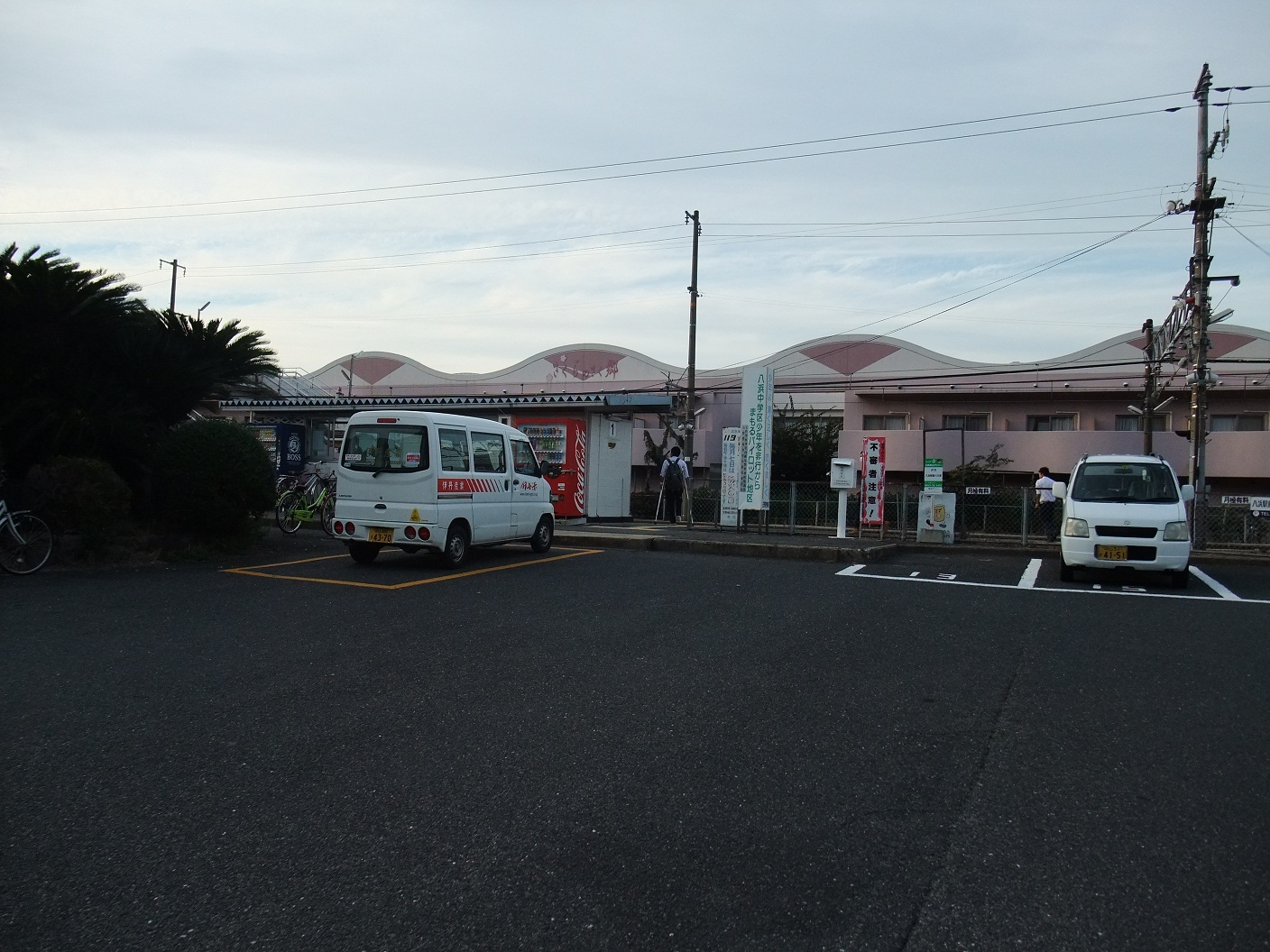
- Hachihama Station, October 2012

General information
- Location: 480 Osaki Hachihamacho,, Tamano-shi, Okayama-ken 706-0224; Japan
- Coordinates: 34°31′55.17″N 133°55′9.09″E
- Owner: West Japan Railway Company
- Operator: West Japan Railway Company
- Line: L Uno Line
- Distance: 26.6 km (16.5 miles) from Okayama
- Platforms: 2 side platforms
- Tracks: 2
- Connections: Bus stop

Other information
- Status: Unstaffed
- Station code: JR-L13
- Website: Official website

History
- Opened: June 12, 1910

Passengers
- FY2019: 419 daily
Location
- Location within Okayama Prefecture Location within Japan

Hachihama Station (八浜駅, Hachihama-eki) is a passenger railway station located in the city of Tamano, Okayama Prefecture, Japan, operated by the West Japan Railway Company (JR West).

== Lines ==
Hachihama Station is served by the JR Uno Line, and is located 26.6 kilometers from the terminus of the line at Okayama and 11.5 kilometers from Chayamachi.

== Station layout ==
The station consists of two ground-level opposed side platforms, with one entrance/exit near the center of each platform. The platforms are connected by a footbridge. There is no station building and the station is unattended.

=== Platforms ===
1	■ Uno Line	for Chayamachi, Okayama
2	■ Uno Line	for Uno

== Adjacent stations ==
«	Service	»
JR West Uno Line
Tsuneyama	Local	Bizen-Tai

== History ==
Hachihama Station was opened on 12 June 1910. With the privatization of Japanese National Railways (JNR) on 1 April 1987, the station came under the control of JR West.

== Passenger statistics ==
In fiscal 2019, the station was used by an average of 419 passengers daily

== Surrounding area ==
- Okayama Prefectural Tamano Konan High School
- Tamano City Osaki Elementary School

== See also ==
- List of railway stations in Japan
