= Seto-Ōhashi Line =

Railway line in Japan

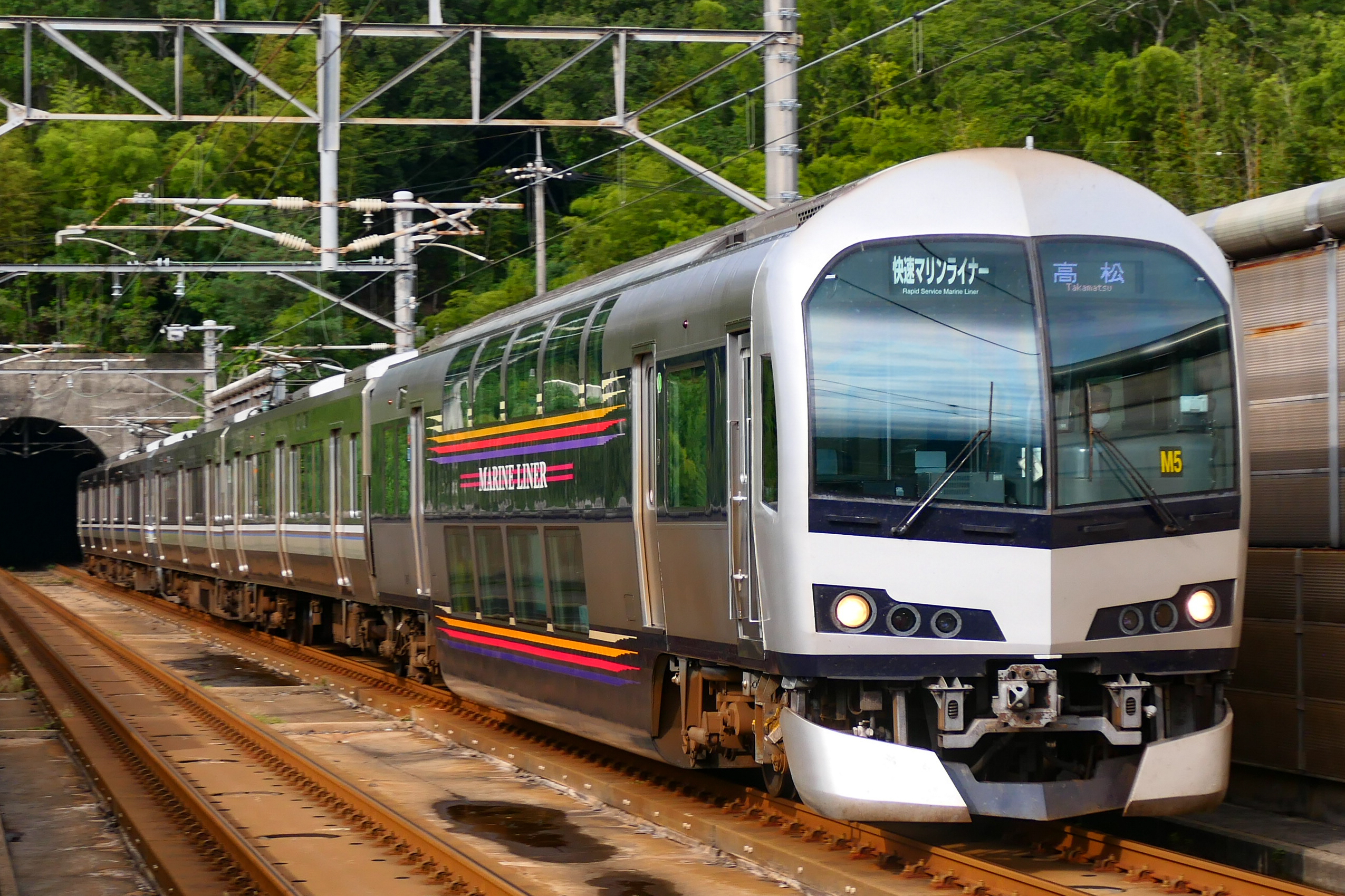
Rapid train Marine Liner

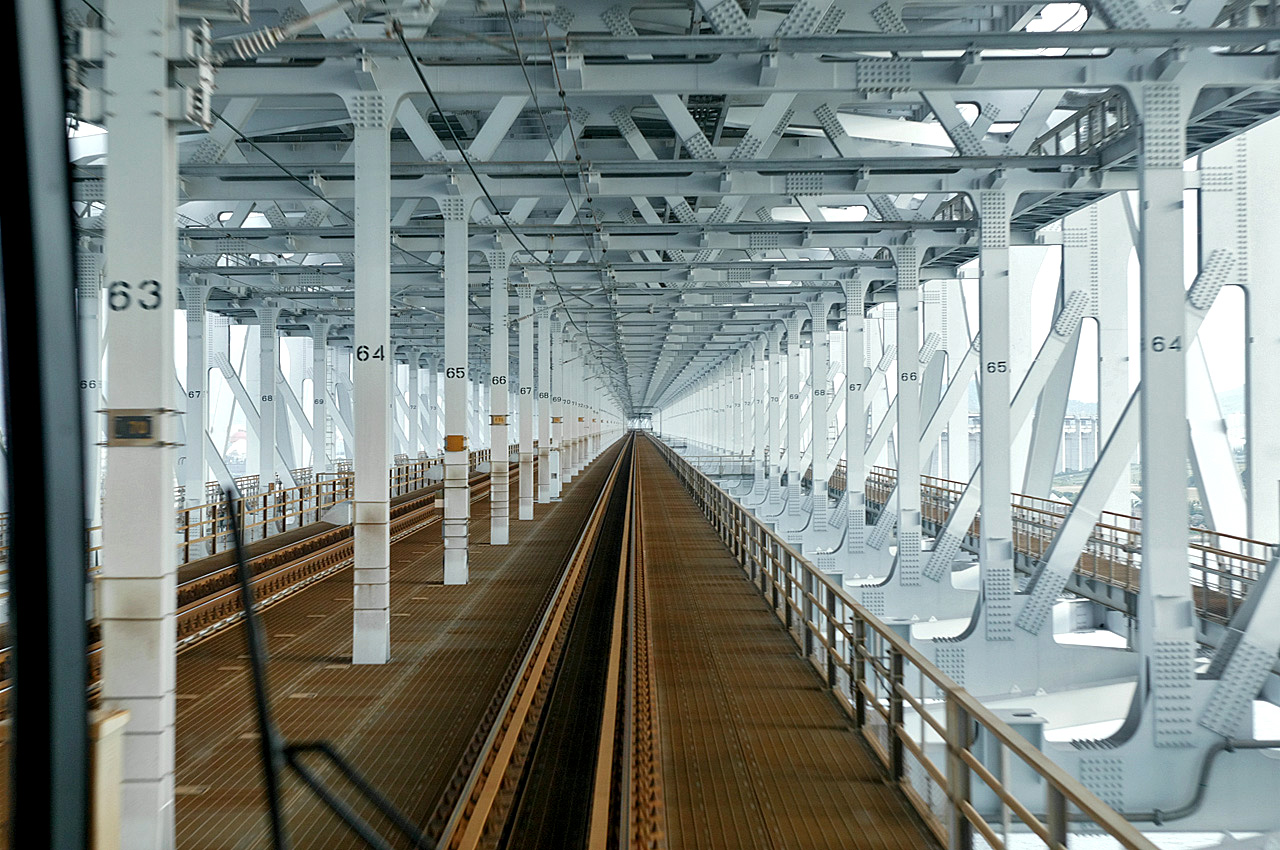
Rear cab view inside Great Seto Bridge

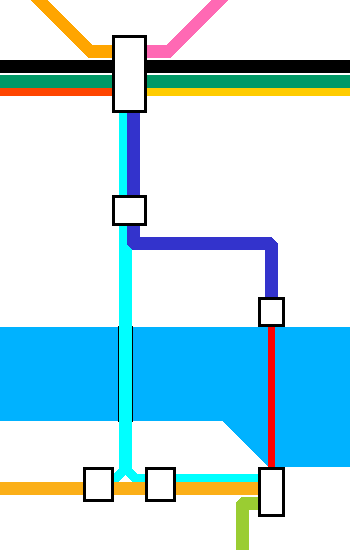

The Seto-Ōhashi Line (瀬戸大橋線, Seto-Ōhashi-sen) is a railway line operated by West Japan Railway Company (JR West) and Shikoku Railway Company (JR Shikoku) in Japan which links Okayama Station in Okayama Prefecture with Takamatsu Station in Kagawa Prefecture via the Great Seto Bridge. It is not a distinct railway line, but an official nickname given to a composite section formed of three different lines. Service commenced along with the opening of the Great Seto Bridge in 1988.

== Basic data ==
- Operators, lines:
  - Total distance: 71.8 km
  - JR West (Services and tracks)
    - Uno Line ^{1}: Okayama — Chayamachi, 14.9 km
    - Honshi-Bisan Line: Chayamachi — Kojima, 12.9 km
  - JR Shikoku (Services and tracks)
    - Honshi-Bisan Line: Kojima — Utazu, 18.1 km
    - Yosan Line ^{1}: Utazu — Sakaide — Takamatsu 25.9 km
  - JR Freight (Services)
    - Uno Line ^{1}: Okayama — Chayamachi, 14.9 km
    - Honshi-Bisan Line: Chayamachi — Kojima — Utazu, 31.0 km
    - Yosan Line ^{1}: Utazu — Sakaide — Takamatsu 25.9 km

^{1}: Only the portions of these lines are called Seto-Ōhashi Line.

- Gauge: 1,067 mm (3 ft 6 in)
- Stations: 22
- Track:
  - Double: Chayamachi — Takamatsu
  - Single: the remainder
- Electrification: 1,500 V DC
- Railway signalling: Automatic

== Services ==
As a link between Honshu and Shikoku, the line has many limited express trains, including the Shiokaze, Nanpū, Uzushio, and Sunrise Seto. There are also rapid trains such as the Sun Port and Marine Liner.

The segment operated by JR West (Okayama — Kojima) accepts ICOCA, a smart card ticketing system.

== Stations ==
SK: Shiokaze
NP: Nampū
US: Uzushio
SS: Sunrise Seto
ML: Rapid Marine Liner
SP: Rapid Sun Port

All trains stop at stations marked "●" and pass stations marked "-". Some trains stop at "▲" and few trains stop at △.

Operator	Line	Station			Distance (km)	SK	NP	US	SS	ML	SP	Transfers	Location	
JR West	Uno Line	M01	Okayama	岡山	0.0	●	●	●	●	●		Sanyō Shinkansen; Sanyō Main Line; Tsuyama Line; Kibi Line (Momotaro Line); Okaden: ■ Higashiyama Line ■ Seikibashi Line (Both at Okayama-Ekimae)	Kita-ku, Okayama	Okayama
JR West	Uno Line	M02	Ōmoto	大元	2.5	-	-	-	-	△			Kita-ku, Okayama	Okayama
JR West	Uno Line	M03	Bizen-Nishiichi	備前西市	4.5	-	-	-	-	△			Minami-ku, Okayama	Okayama
JR West	Uno Line	M04	Senoo	妹尾	8.3	-	-	-	-	▲			Minami-ku, Okayama	Okayama
JR West	Uno Line	M05	Bitchū-Mishima	備中箕島	10.2	-	-	-	-	-			Minami-ku, Okayama	Okayama
JR West	Uno Line	M06	Hayashima	早島	11.9	-	-	-	-	▲			Hayashima	Okayama
JR West	Uno Line	M07	Kuguhara	久々原	13.2	-	-	-	-	-			Hayashima	Okayama
JR West	Uno Line	M08	Chayamachi	茶屋町	14.9	-	-	-	-	●		Uno Line (L08, Southward)	Kurashiki	Okayama
JR West	Honshi-Bisan Line	M08	Chayamachi	茶屋町	14.9	-	-	-	-	●		Uno Line (L08, Southward)	Kurashiki	Okayama
JR West	Honshi-Bisan Line	M09	Uematsu	植松	17.8	-	-	-	-	△			Minami-ku, Okayama	Okayama
JR West	Honshi-Bisan Line	M10	Kimi	木見	20.5	-	-	-	-	△			Kurashiki	Okayama
JR West	Honshi-Bisan Line	M11	Kaminochō	上の町	24.6	-	-	-	-	△			Kurashiki	Okayama
JR West	Honshi-Bisan Line	M12	Kojima	児島	27.8	●	●	●	●	●			Kurashiki	Okayama
JR Shikoku	Honshi-Bisan Line	M12	Kojima	児島	27.8	●	●	●	●	●			Kurashiki	Okayama
JR Shikoku	Honshi-Bisan Line	(Great Seto Bridge)												
JR Shikoku	Honshi-Bisan Line	Y09	Utazu	宇多津	45.9	●	●	●			●	■ Yosan Line (Westward)	Utazu	Kagawa
JR Shikoku	Yosan Line	Y09	Utazu	宇多津	45.9	●	●	●			●	■ Yosan Line (Westward)	Utazu	Kagawa
JR Shikoku	Yosan Line	Y08	Sakaide	坂出	50.5			-	●	●	●		Sakaide	Kagawa
JR Shikoku	Yosan Line	Y07	Yasoba	八十場	53.2			-	-	-	-		Sakaide	Kagawa
JR Shikoku	Yosan Line	Y06	Kamogawa	鴨川	55.2			-	-	△	△		Sakaide	Kagawa
JR Shikoku	Yosan Line	Y05	Sanuki-Fuchū	讃岐府中	57.6			-	-	-	-		Sakaide	Kagawa
JR Shikoku	Yosan Line	Y04	Kokubu	国分	59.9			-	-	△	△		Takamatsu	Kagawa
JR Shikoku	Yosan Line	Y03	Hashioka	端岡	62.3			-	-	△	●		Takamatsu	Kagawa
JR Shikoku	Yosan Line	Y02	Kinashi	鬼無	65.7			-	-	△	△		Takamatsu	Kagawa
JR Shikoku	Yosan Line		Takamatsu Freight Terminal	高松貨物ターミナル	67.1			-	-	-	-		Takamatsu	Kagawa
JR Shikoku	Yosan Line	Y01	Kōzai	香西	68.4			-	-	-	-		Takamatsu	Kagawa
JR Shikoku	Yosan Line	Y00	Takamatsu	高松	71.8			●	●	●	●	■ Kōtoku Line (T28); Kotoden Kotohira Line (Takamatsu-Chikkō)	Takamatsu	Kagawa

== See also ==
- List of railway lines in Japan
- Tsugaru-Kaikyō Line
