= Ōmoto Station =

Railway station in Okayama, Japan

Ōmoto Station 大元駅
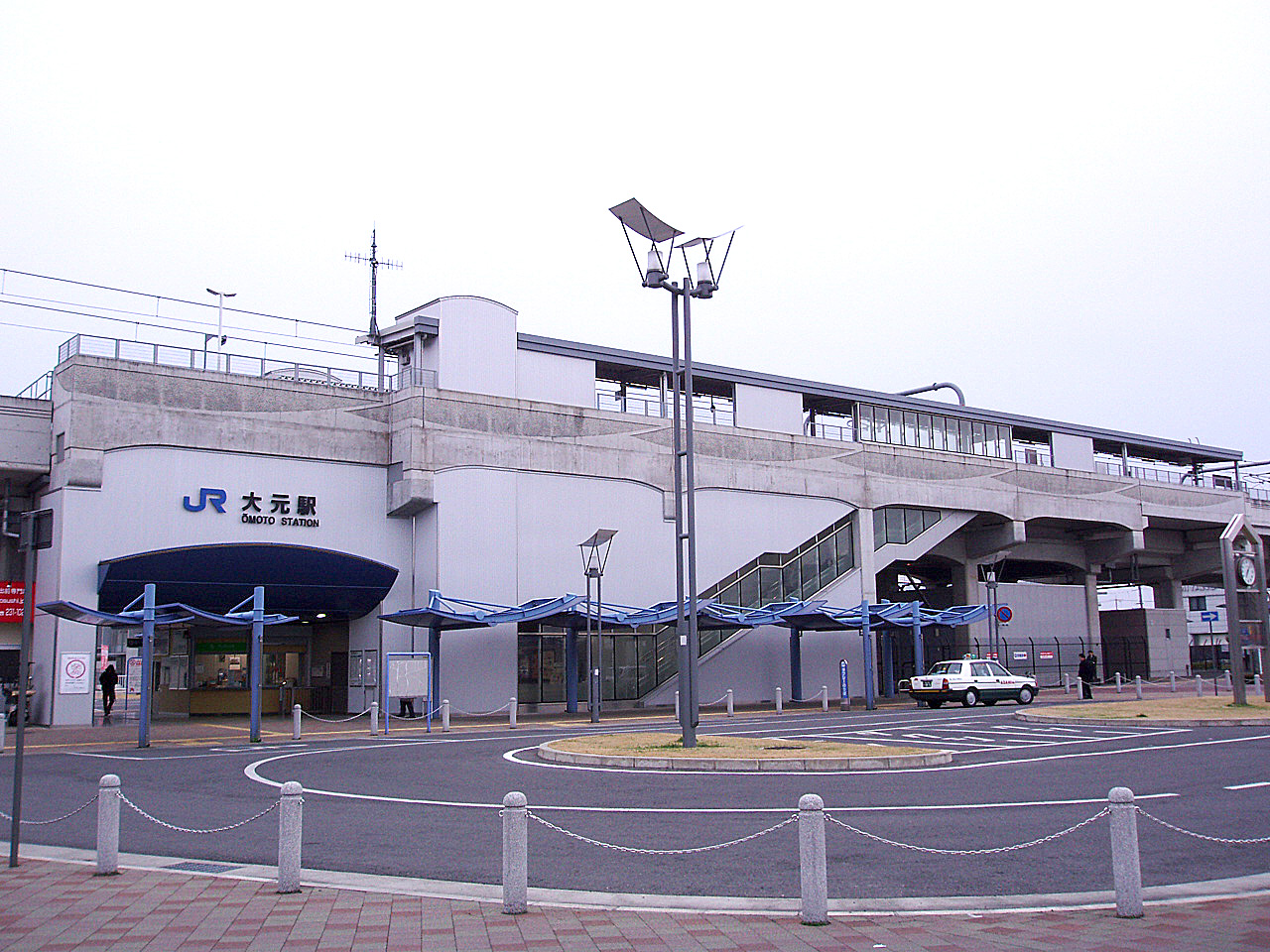
- West side of the station, March 2006

General information
- Location: 10-6 Ōmoto Ekimae, Kita-ku, Okayama-shi, Okayama-ken 700-0923; Japan
- Coordinates: 34°38′50.72″N 133°54′38.7″E
- Owner: West Japan Railway Company
- Operator: West Japan Railway Company
- Lines: L Uno Line; M Seto-Ōhashi Line
- Distance: 2.5 km (1.6 miles) from Okayama
- Platforms: 2 side platforms
- Tracks: 2
- Connections: Bus stop

Other information
- Status: Staffed (Midori no Madoguchi)
- Station code: JR-L02; JR-M02
- Website: Official website

History
- Opened: 12 June 1910
- Former names: Shikada (until 1925)

Passengers
- FY2019: 1837 daily

Services
Uno Line
Limited Express Uzushio: Does not stop at this station
Okayama	Rapid Marine Liner	Bizen-Nishiichi
Ōmoto	Local	Senoo
Location
- Location within Okayama Prefecture Location within Japan

Ōmoto Station (大元駅, Ōmoto-eki) is a passenger railway station located in Kita-ku of the city of Okayama, Okayama Prefecture, Japan. It is operated by the West Japan Railway Company (JR West).

== Lines ==
Ōmoto Station is served by the JR Uno Line, and is located 2.5 kilometers from the terminus of the line at Okayama. It is also served by the Seto-Ōhashi Line and is 69.3 kilometers from the terminus of that line at Takamatsu.

== Station layout ==
The station consists of a two elevated ground-level side platforms, with the station building underneath. The station has a Midori no Madoguchi staffed ticket office.

=== Platforms ===
1	■ L Uno Line	for Okayama
1	■ M Seto-Ōhashi Line	for Okayama
2	■ L Uno Line	for Kojima, Uno and Takamatsu
2	■ M Seto-Ōhashi Line	for Kojima, Uno, Takamatsu

== Adjacent stations ==
«	Service	»
Uno Line
Limited Express Uzushio: Does not stop at this station
Okayama	Rapid Marine Liner	Bizen-Nishiichi
Okayama	Local	Bizen-Nishiichi

== History ==
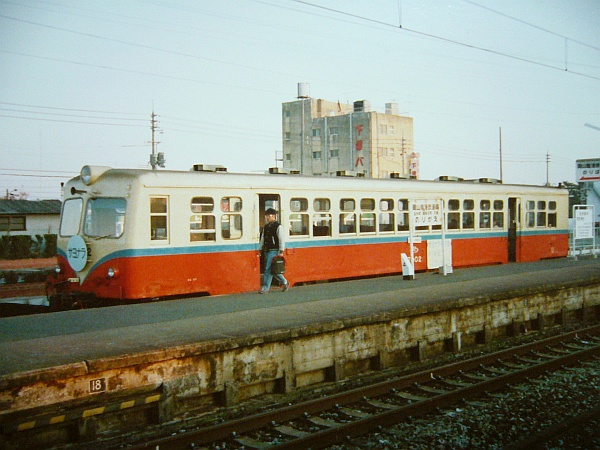
Okayama Rinkō Railway train at Ōmoto Station, 1984

The station opened on 12 June 1910 as Shikada Station (鹿田駅, Shikada-eki). On 6 March 1925, the station was relocated and renamed Ōmoto Station.

From 1 August 1951 to 30 December 1984, the station was also served by the Okayama Rinkō Railway.

== Passenger statistics ==
In fiscal 2019, the station was used by an average of 1837 passengers daily

== Surrounding area ==
- Munetada Shrine (宗忠神社)
- Shimotsui Electric Railway Head Office
- Okayama Prefectural Psychiatric Medical Center

== See also ==
- List of railway stations in Japan
