= Bizen-Tai Station =

Railway station in Tamano, Okayama Prefecture, Japan

Bizen-Tai Station 備前田井駅
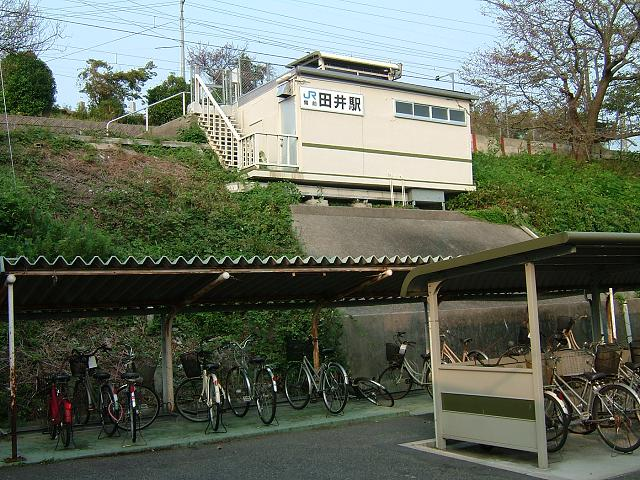
- Bizen-Tai Station

General information
- Location: 3-3-1 Tai, Tamano-shi, Okayama-ken 706-0001; Japan
- Coordinates: 34°30′57″N 133°56′36.59″E
- Owner: West Japan Railway Company
- Operator: West Japan Railway Company
- Line: L Uno Line
- Distance: 30.3 km (18.8 miles) from Okayama
- Platforms: 2 side platforms
- Tracks: 1
- Connections: Bus stop

Other information
- Status: Unstaffed
- Station code: JR-L14
- Website: Official website

History
- Opened: January 1, 1939
- Closed: 1 November 1940 to 15 November 1950

Passengers
- FY2019: 318 daily
Location
- Location within Okayama Prefecture Location within Japan

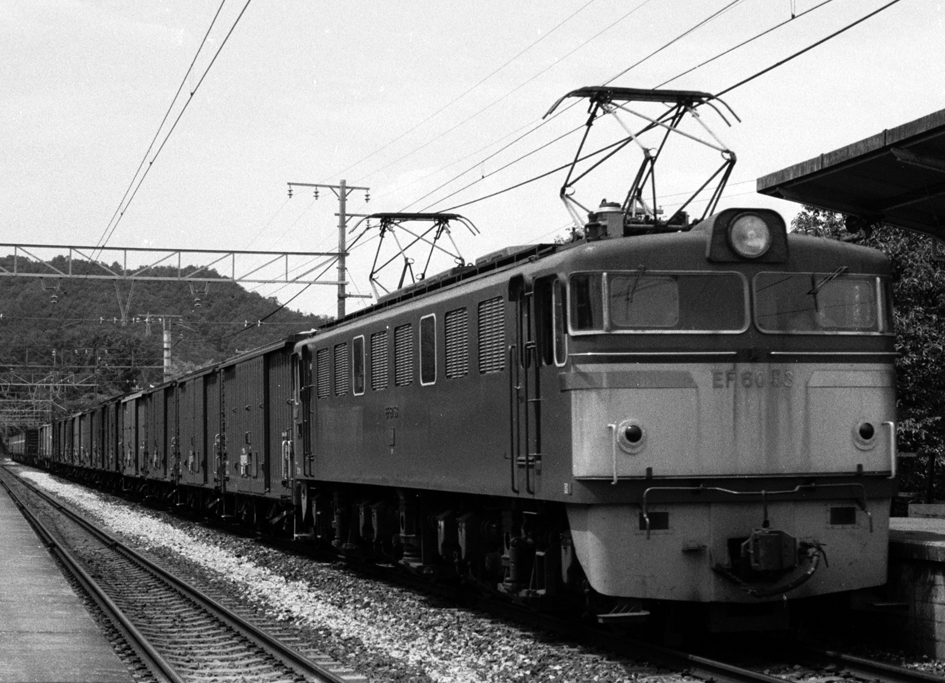
JNR Class EF60 electric locomotive EF60 53 passing through Bizen-Tai Station on a freight service

Bizen-Tai Station (備前田井駅, Bizen-Tai-eki) is a passenger railway station located in the city of Tamano, Okayama Prefecture, Japan, operated by the West Japan Railway Company (JR West).

== Lines ==
Bizen-Tai Station is served by the JR Uno Line, and is located 30.3 kilometers from the terminus of the line at Okayama and 15.45 kilometers from Chayamachi.

== Station layout ==
The station consists of two opposed side platforms on an embankment. The platforms are connected by a footbridge. There is no station building and the station is unattended. The track layout is a Y-branch (double opening), and there is no safety siding.

=== Platforms ===
1	■ Uno Line	for Chayamachi, Okayama
2	■ Uno Line	for Uno

== Adjacent stations ==
«	Service	»
JR West Uno Line
Hachihama	Local	Uno

== History ==
Bizen-Tai Station was opened on 1 January 1939. The station was closed from 1 November 1940 to 15 November 1950. With the privatization of Japanese National Railways (JNR) on 1 April 1987, the station came under the control of JR West.

== Passenger statistics ==
In fiscal 2019, the station was used by an average of 318 passengers daily

== Surrounding area ==
- Road Station Miyama Park
- Tamano City Tai Elementary School

== See also ==
- List of railway stations in Japan
