= Hikozaki Shell Mound =

Ancient shell midden in Okayama, Japan

- 彦崎貝塚 (Japanese)
- Hikozaki Shell Mound Hikozaki Shell Mound (Japan)
- Interactive map of Hikozaki Shell Mound
- 34°32′58″N 133°50′07″E
- Type: shell midden, settlement
- Periods: Jōmon period
- Location: Minami-ku, Okayama, Japan
- Region: San'yō region

Site notes
- Public access: Yes (park)

The Hikozaki Shell Mound (彦崎貝塚, Hikozaki kaizuka) is an archaeological site in the Hikozaki neighborhood of Minami-ku of the city of Okayama, Okayama Prefecture, in the San'yō region of western Japan. It contains the largest known shell midden in western Japan, and was designated a National Historic Site in 2008.

== Overview ==
During the early to middle Jōmon period (approximately 4000 to 2500 BC), sea levels were five to six meters higher than at present, and the ambient temperature was also 2 deg C higher. During this period, the Kantō region was inhabited by the Jōmon people, many of whom lived in coastal settlements. The middens associated with such settlements contain bone, botanical material, mollusc shells, sherds, lithics, and other artifacts and ecofacts associated with the now-vanished inhabitants, and these features, provide a useful source into the diets and habits of Jōmon society. Most of the 2400 known shell middens are found along the Pacific coast of Japan. The Hikozaki Shell Mound is located on the south coast of former Kojima Bay facing the Seto Inland Sea. This area is noted for its dense concentration of ancient middens.

Archaeological excavations have been conducted since 2003, revealing that the midden covers an area of about 100 meters north-to-south and about 80 meters east-to-west, making this the largest known shell midden in western Japan. It dates from the early Jōmon period and continued until the end of the Jōmon period. The shell layer had a thickness of 1.7 meters in some locations. Acorn underground storage pits have also been found in the swampy area at the tip of the hill. From the types of shells at various layers in the midden, it was possible to determine that the target areas for collecting shellfish changed from tidal flats in the early Jōmon period, to rocky reefs in the middle Jōmon period, to a wide range of tidal flats and rocky reefs in the late Jōmon period, and again to tidal flats in the final Jōmon period, corresponding to changes in the environment and sea levels.

Twenty-five sets of human remains were found within the midden, with the bones placed in a crouching position. These include the remains of a woman with a fetus. A large amount of Jōmon pottery and stone tools were also discovered. The earthenware had a distinctive pattern, making this midden the type site for 'Hikozaki-style earthenware'. The excavated items include accessories such as bracelets made from shells and bones, as well as shells, and animal and fish bones.

The site is located about five minutes on foot from Hikosaki Station on the JR West Uno Line.

== See also ==
- List of Historic Sites of Japan (Okayama)
