= Marine Liner =

Japanese rapid train service

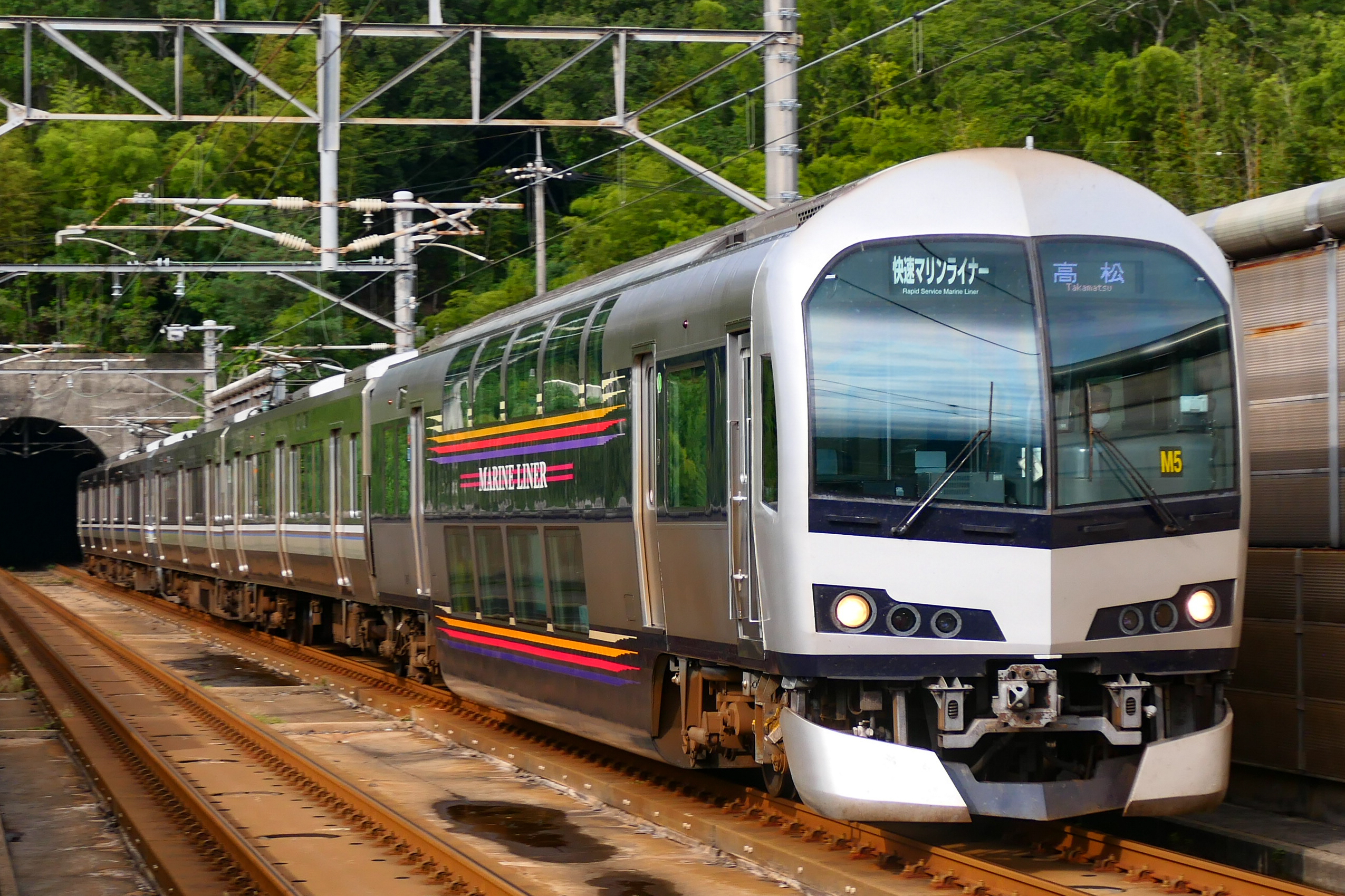
- The Marine Liner 41 service to Takamatsu passing Kimi Station, led by a JR Shikoku 5000 series EMU

Overview
- Service type: Rapid
- First service: April 1988
- Current operators: JR West, JR Shikoku

Route
- Line used: Seto-Ohashi Line

Technical
- Rolling stock: JR West 223-5000 series and JR Shikoku 5000 series EMUs
- Operating speed: 130 km/h (81 mph)

The Marine Liner (マリンライナー, Marin Rainā) is a rapid train service in Japan operated by West Japan Railway Company (JR West) and Shikoku Railway Company (JR Shikoku) since April 1988. The Marine Liner links Okayama, the capital city of Okayama Prefecture and a major station on the Sanyō Shinkansen, with Takamatsu, the capital city of Kagawa Prefecture on the island of Shikoku, via the Great Seto Bridge. Operating at a top speed of 130 km/h (81 mph), the journey takes approximately 55 minutes.

== Overview ==
Since 1 October 2003, the Marine Liner has been operated by JR West 223-5000 series EMU trainsets. The car at the Takamatsu end of all trains (except some early morning/late night trains) is a JR Shikoku 5000 series bi-level (double-deck) cab car with reserved seating. Previously, 213 series EMUs were used.

From Okayama to Takamatsu, all Marine Liner trains stop at Chayamachi, Kojima and Sakaide. Most trains also stop at either Senoo or Hayashima, or both. Some early morning and late evening trains make additional stops at intermittent stations on the Seto-Ohashi and Yosan lines.

Unlike the other express trains between Okayama and Shikoku which are Limited Express services (Shiokaze to Matsuyama and Nanpu to Kōchi), the Marine Liner is classified as a "Rapid" (快速, kaisoku) service with only a standard fare required. Passengers may upgrade to reserved seating in the bi-level (double-deck) car, in both standard seats (lower deck) or Green Car seats (upper deck and 4 observation seats behind the driver's cab) for an additional fee.

A crew change for the train driver and conductor occurs at Kojima, the boundary station between the two operating railways.

== Route ==
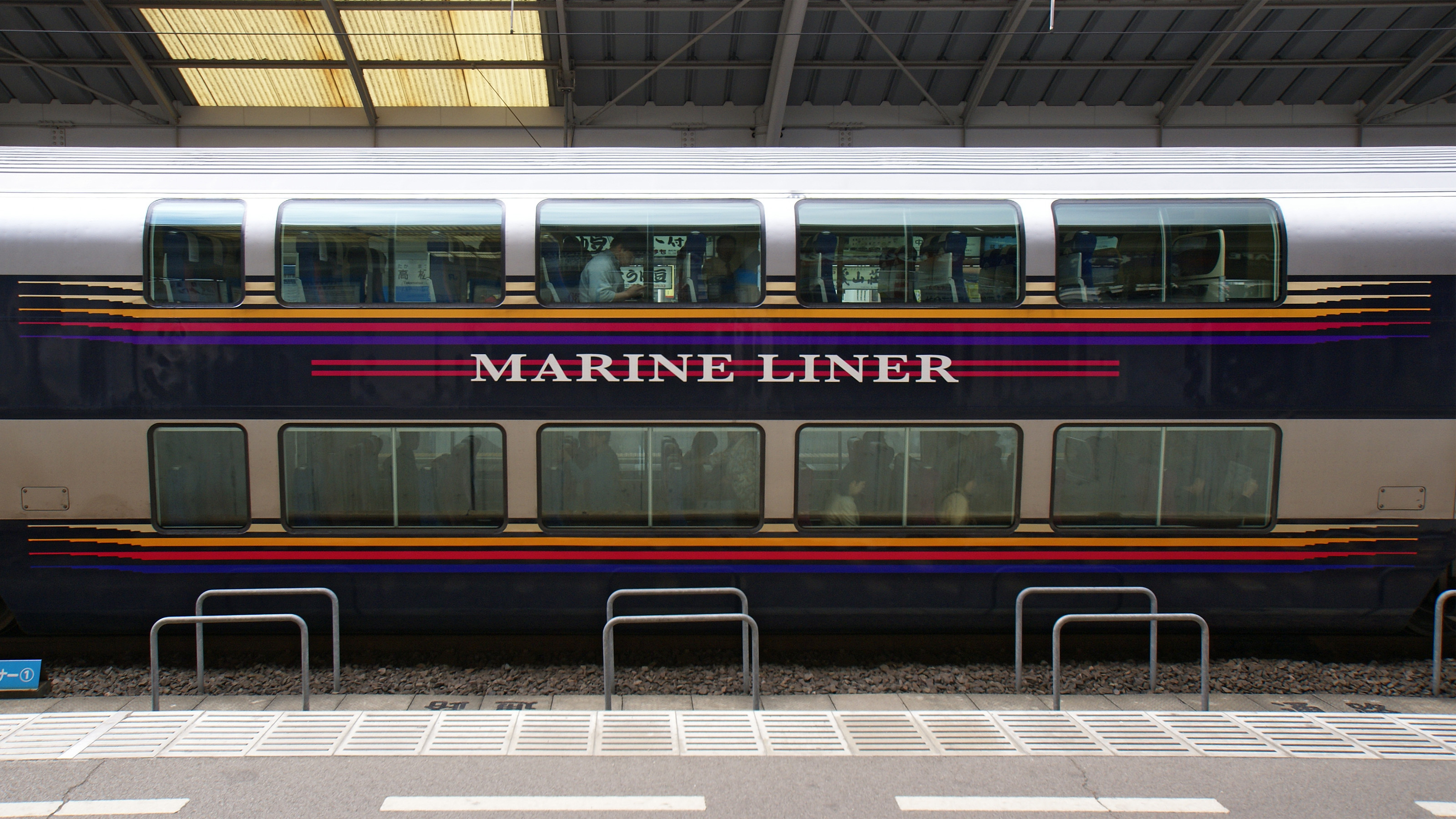
Side view of Marine Liner 5000 series bilevel car at Takamatsu Station, May 2007

The Marine Liner runs over two sections known collectively as the Seto-Ohashi Line. The Okayama-Kojima section is operated by JR West^{1}, and the Kojima-Takamatsu section is operated by JR Shikoku^{2}.

^{1}Portions run over the JR Uno Line
^{2}Portions run over the JR Yosan Line

== Stations ==
Key (as of December 2006)

●	All trains stop
▲	Most trains stop
♦	Few trains stop
|	Pass/No trains stop

Station	Service
Okayama 岡山	●
Ōmoto 大元	♦
Bizen-Nishiichi 備前西市	♦
Senoo 妹尾	▲
Bitchū-Mishima 備中箕島	|
Hayashima 早島	▲
Kuguhara 久々原	|
Chayamachi 茶屋町	●
Uematsu 植松	♦
Kimi 木見	♦
Kaminochō 上の町	♦
Kojima 児島	●
Great Seto Bridge
Sakaide 坂出	●
Yasoba 八十場	|
Kamogawa 鴨川	♦
Sanuki-Fuchū 讃岐府中	|
Kokubu 国分	♦
Hashioka 端岡	♦
Kinashi 鬼無	♦
Kōzai 香西	|
Takamatsu 高松	●

== Formations ==
Services are formed as 2-, 3-, 5-, or 7-car formations as shown below with car 1 at the Takamatsu end. All cars are no smoking. Most of the trains use 5-car formations.

- Green: Green class (first class)
- White: Standard class
- G (green class), R (standard class): Reserved seats
- NR (standard class only): Non-reserved seats

1	2
223-5000 series
NR	NR

1	2	3
5000 series
G	NR	NR
R	NR	NR

1	2	3	4	5
5000 series			223-5000 series	
G	NR	NR	NR	NR
R	NR	NR	NR	NR

1	2	3	4	5	6	7
5000 series			223-5000 series		223-5000 series	
G	NR	NR	NR	NR	NR	NR
R	NR	NR	NR	NR	NR	NR

== History ==
The Marine Liner service was introduced in April 1988, using 3-car 213 series EMUs formed as three-car, six-car, or nine-car formations.
