= Kuguhara Station =

Railway station in Hayashima, Okayama Prefecture, Japan

Kuguhara Station 久々原駅
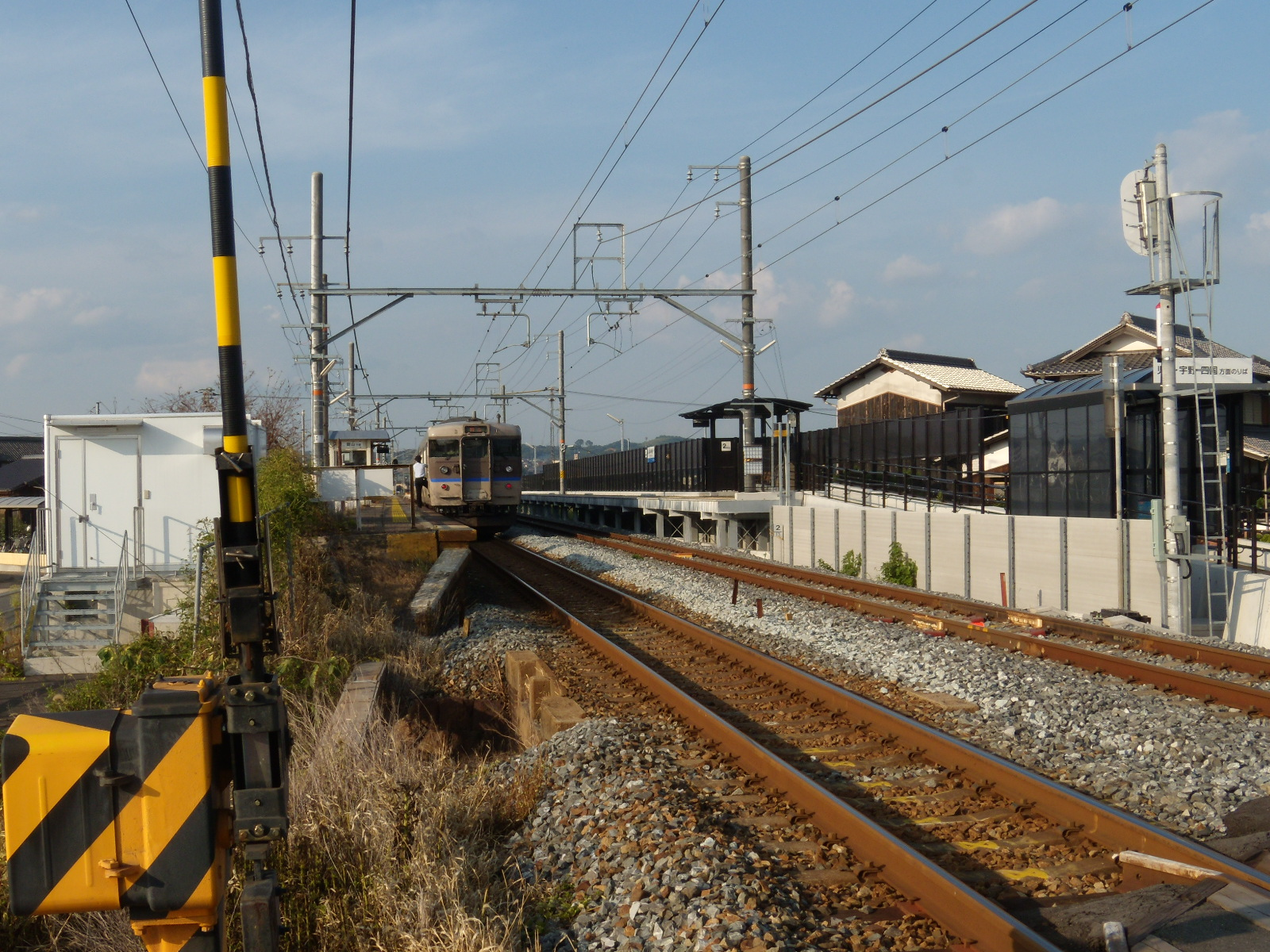
- Kuguhara Station, September 2009

General information
- Location: 913-7 Maegata, Hayashima-cho, Tsukubo-gun, Okayama-ken 701-0303; Japan
- Coordinates: 34°35′31.79″N 133°49′40.53″E
- Owner: West Japan Railway Company
- Operator: West Japan Railway Company
- Lines: L Uno Line; M Seto-Ōhashi Line
- Distance: 13.2 km (8.2 miles) from Okayama
- Platforms: 2 side platforms
- Tracks: 2
- Connections: Bus stop

Other information
- Status: Unstaffed
- Station code: JR-L07; JR-M07
- Website: Official website

History
- Opened: March 20, 1952

Passengers
- FY2019: 75 daily
Location
- Location within Okayama Prefecture Location within Japan

Kuguhara Station (久々原駅, Kuguhara-eki) is a passenger railway station located in the town of Hayashima, Okayama, Japan. It is operated by the West Japan Railway Company (JR West).

== Lines ==
Kuguhara Station is served by the JR Uno Line, and is located 13.2 kilometers from the terminus of the line at Okayama. It is also served by the Seto-Ōhashi Line and is 58.6 kilometers from the terminus of that line at Takamatsu.

== Station layout ==
The station consists of two opposed side platforms on a slight viaduct, connected by a level crossing. The station is unattended.

=== Platforms ===
1	■ L Uno Line	for Okayama
1	■ M Seto-Ōhashi Line	for Okayama
2	■ L Uno Line	for Kojima, Uno and Takamatsu
2	■ M Seto-Ōhashi Line	for Kojima, Uno, Takamatsu

== Adjacent stations ==
«	Service	»
Uno Line
Limited Express Uzushio: Does not stop at this station
Rapid Marine Liner: Does not stop at this station
Hayashima	Local	Chayamachi

== History ==
Kuguhara Station was opened on 20 March 1952. With the privatization of the Japanese National Railways (JNR) on 1 April 1987, the station came under the control of JR West. A second side platform was added on 25 January 2009.

== Passenger statistics ==
In fiscal 2019, the station was used by an average of 75 passengers daily

== Surrounding area ==
Located in a residential area and countryside, there are no commercial facilities in the surrounding area.

== See also ==
- List of railway stations in Japan
