= Bitchū-Mishima Station =

Railway station in Okayama, Japan

Bitchū-Mishima Station 備中箕島駅
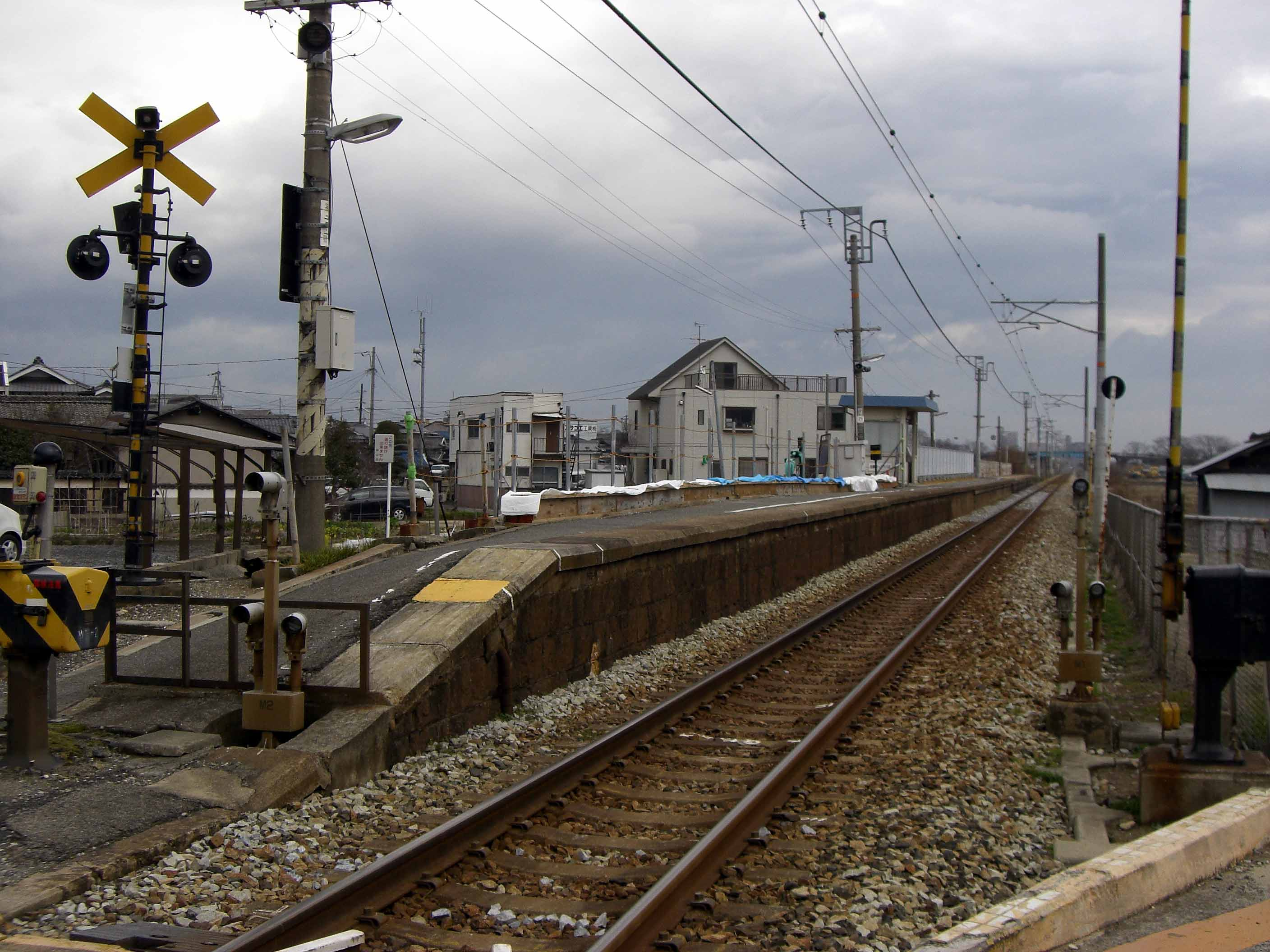
- Bitchū-Mishima Station, February 2007

General information
- Location: 617-2 Hamamae, Minoshima, Minami-ku, Okayama-shi, Okayama-ken; Japan
- Coordinates: 34°36′20.49″N 133°51′2.85″E
- Owner: West Japan Railway Company
- Operator: West Japan Railway Company
- Lines: L Uno Line; M Seto-Ōhashi Line
- Distance: 10.2 km (6.3 miles) from Okayama
- Platforms: 1 side platform
- Tracks: 1
- Connections: Bus stop

Other information
- Status: Unstaffed
- Station code: JR-L05; JR-M05
- Website: Official website

History
- Opened: January 1, 1939

Passengers
- FY2019: 201 daily

Services
Uno Line
Limited Express Uzushio: Does not stop at this station
Rapid Marine Liner: Does not stop at this station
Senoo	Local	Hayashima
Location
- Location within Okayama Prefecture Location within Japan

Bitchū-Mishima Station (備中箕島駅, Bitchū-Mishima-eki) is a passenger railway station located in Minami-ku of the city of Okayama, Okayama Prefecture, Japan. It is operated by the West Japan Railway Company (JR West).

== Lines ==
Bitchū-Mishima Station is served by the JR Uno Line, and is located 10.2 kilometers from the terminus of the line at Okayama. It is also served by the Seto-Ōhashi Line and is 61.6 kilometers from the terminus of that line at Takamatsu.

== Station layout ==
The station consists of a single side platform on a slight embankment, serving a single bi-directional line. There is no station building, but only a small shelter directly on the platform and the station is unattended.

== History ==
Bitchū-Mishima Station was opened on 1 January 1939. It was closed from1 November 1940 to 14 November 1950. With the privatization of Japanese National Railways (JNR) on 1 April 1987, the station came under the control of JR West.

== Passenger statistics ==
In fiscal 2019, the station was used by an average of 201 passengers daily

== Surrounding area ==
- Okayama City Minami Ward Office Senoo Regional Center
- Okayama Municipal Seno Hospital
- Okayama Municipal Minoshima Elementary School

== See also ==
- List of railway stations in Japan
