= Uno Line =

Railway line in Okayama prefecture, Japan

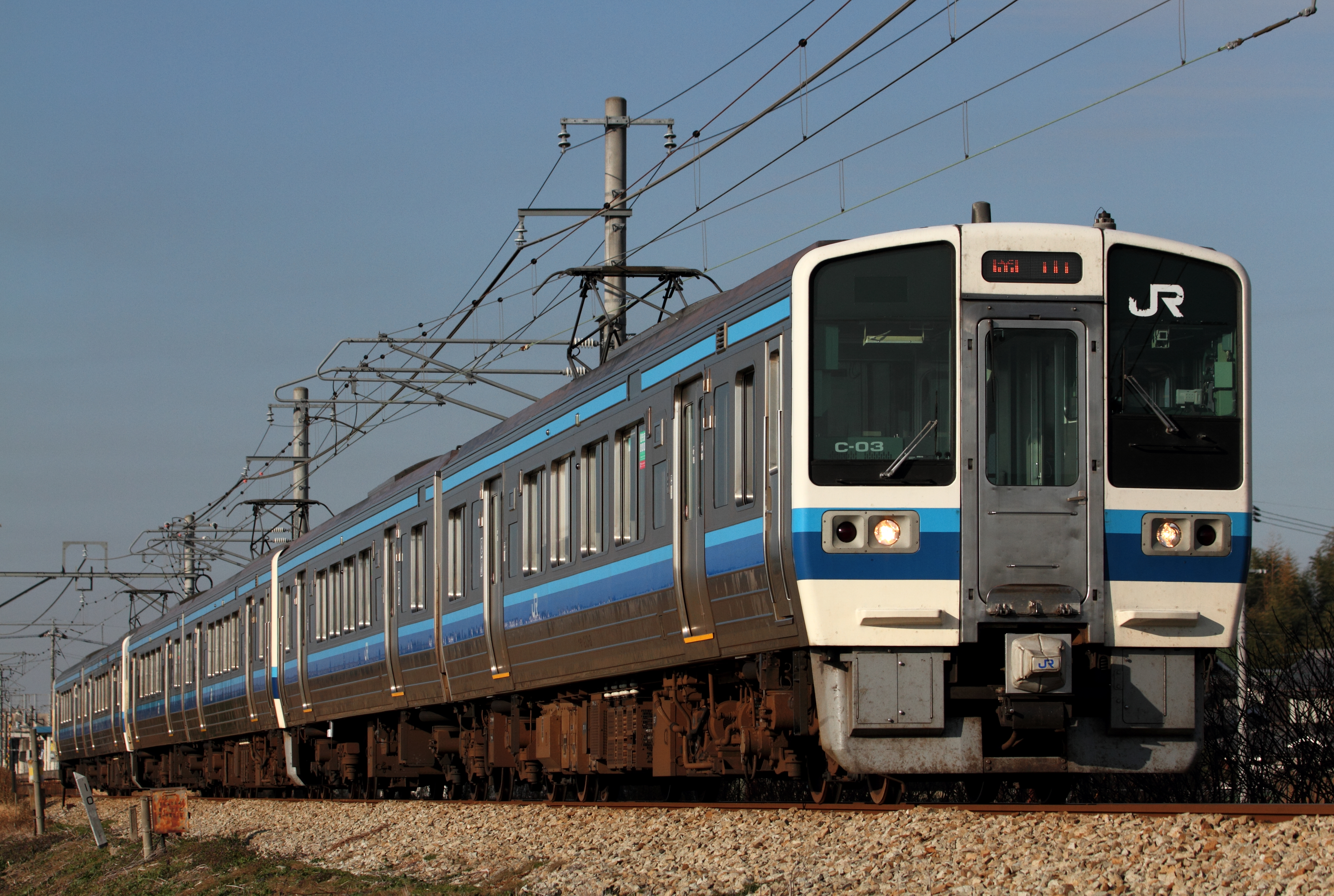
- 213 Series on the Uno Line between Tsuneyama station and Hachihama station

Overview
- Other name: Uno Port Line
- Native name: 宇野線
- Owner: JR West
- Locale: Okayama Prefecture
- Termini: Okayama; Uno
- Stations: 15

Service
- Type: Heavy rail

History
- Opened: 12 June 1910; 115 years ago

Technical
- Line length: 32.8 km (20.4 mi)
- Track gauge: 1,067 mm (3 ft 6 in)
- Electrification: 1,500 V DC overhead

The Uno Line (宇野線, Uno-sen) is a Japanese railway line which connects Okayama Station in Okayama to Uno Station in Tamano, both in Okayama Prefecture. It is owned and run by the West Japan Railway Company (JR West). It is also referred to as the Uno-Port Line (宇野みなと線, Uno-minato-sen). Part of the line, between Okayama Station and Chayamachi Station, is known as the Seto-Ōhashi Line.

== Stations ==
- L: Limited express Shiokaze, Nanpū, Sunrise Seto, and Uzushio
- M: Rapid Marine Liner

All trains stop at stations marked "●" and pass stations marked "｜". Some trains stop at "▲", and a few trains stop at "△" Goes another route at "=".

No.	Name		Distance (km)	L	M	Connections	Location	
L01	Okayama	岡山	0.0	●	●	Sanyo Shinkansen; Kibi Line (Momotaro Line); Sanyo Main Line; Tsuyama Line; Okayama Electric Tramway ■ Higashiyama Line/■ Seikibashi Line (at Okayama-Ekimae)	Kita-ku, Okayama	Okayama
L02	Ōmoto	大元	2.5	｜	△		Kita-ku, Okayama	Okayama
L03	Bizen-Nishiichi	備前西市	4.5	｜	△		Minami-ku, Okayama	Okayama
L04	Senoo	妹尾	8.3	｜	▲		Minami-ku, Okayama	Okayama
L05	Bitchū-Mishima	備中箕島	10.2	｜	｜		Minami-ku, Okayama	Okayama
L06	Hayashima	早島	11.9	｜	▲		Hayashima	Okayama
L07	Kuguhara	久々原	13.2	｜	｜		Hayashima	Okayama
L08	Chayamachi	茶屋町	14.9	｜	●	Honshi-Bisan Line (Seto-Ōhashi Line)	Kurashiki	Okayama
L09	Hikosaki	彦崎	18.1	=	=		Minami-ku, Okayama	Okayama
L10	Bizen-Kataoka	備前片岡	20.9	=	=		Minami-ku, Okayama	Okayama
L11	Hazakawa	迫川	22.8	=	=		Minami-ku, Okayama	Okayama
L12	Tsuneyama	常山	24.1	=	=		Tamano	Okayama
L13	Hachihama	八浜	26.6	=	=		Tamano	Okayama
L14	Bizen-Tai	備前田井	30.3	=	=		Tamano	Okayama
L15	Uno	宇野	32.8	=	=		Tamano	Okayama

== Rolling stock ==
Class	Image	Type	Top speed (km/h)	Routes operated
JR Shikoku 2700 series		Diesel multiple unit	130	Limited express Nanpū (Okayama - Kōchi) Limited express Uzushio (Okayama - Tokushima)
JR Shikoku 8600 series		Electric multiple unit	130	Limited express Shiokaze (Okayama - Matsuyama, Uwajima)
JR Shikoku 8000 series		Electric multiple unit	130	Limited express Shiokaze (Okayama - Matsuyama, Uwajima)
JR Shikoku 2000/N2000 series		Diesel multiple unit	120-130	Limited express Nanpū (Okayama - Kōchi)
JR West/JR Central 285 series		Electric multiple unit	130	Limited express Sunrise Seto (Tokyo - Takamatsu)
JR West 223-5000 series, JR Shikoku 5000 series		Electric multiple unit	130	Rapid Marine Liner (Okayama - Takamatsu)
JR West 213 series		Electric multiple unit	110	Okayama - Uno, Kojima
JR West 115 series		Electric multiple unit	110	Okayama - Uno, Kojima
JR West 227-500 series		Electric multiple unit	110	Okayama - Uno, Kojima

== History ==
The entire line opened on 12 June 1910, and until the opening of the Seto Ohashi Bridge in 1988, was the main railway connection to Shikoku (via the Takamatsu ferry). With the privatization of JNR on 1 April 1987, the line came under the control of JR West.

From the start of the 26 March 2016 timetable revision, the line was branded the Uno Port Line (宇野みなと線, Uno-minato-sen).

== See also ==
- List of railway lines in Japan
