= Hayashima =

Hayashima 早島町
- Town
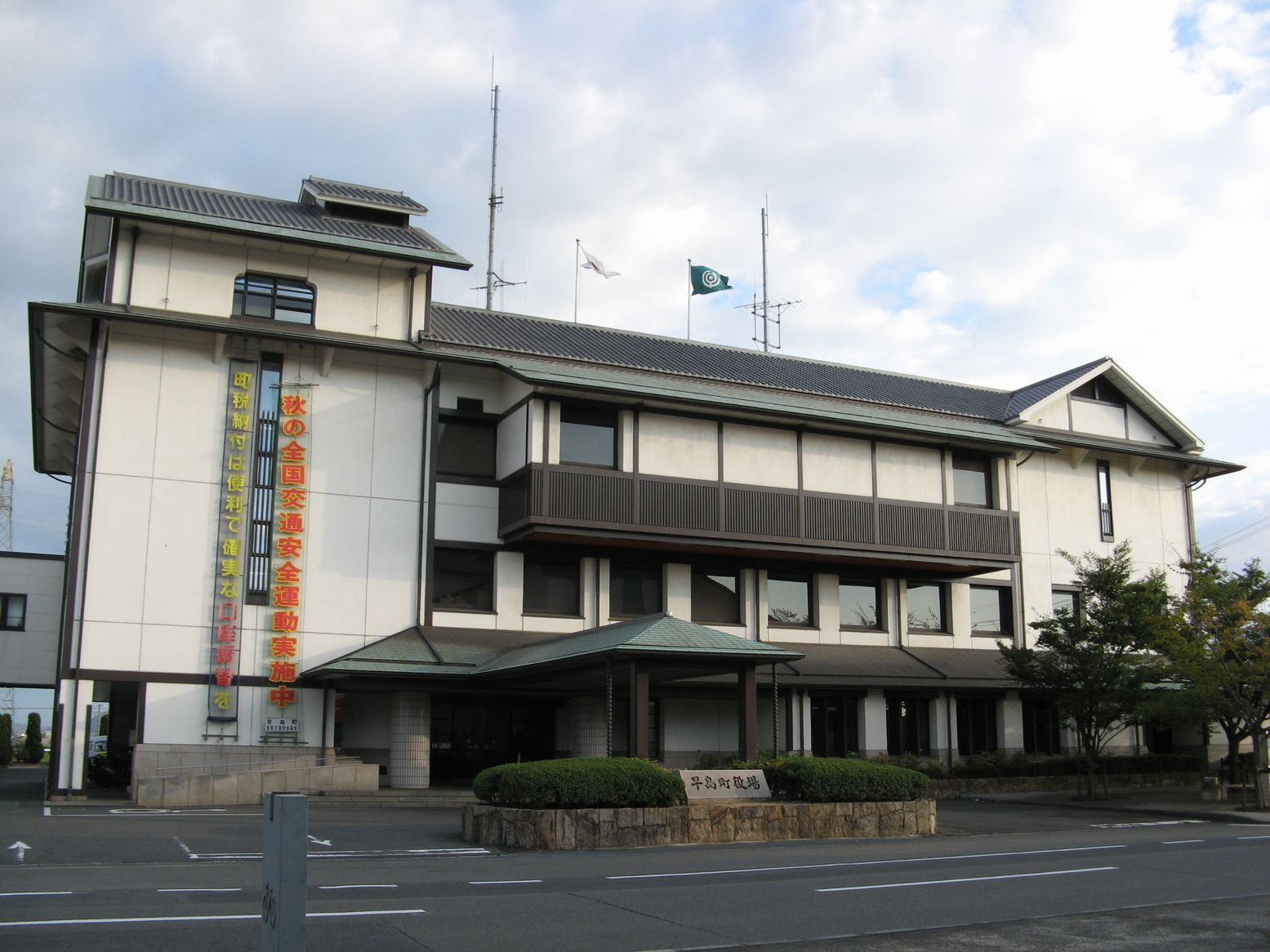
- Hayashima town office

- Flag Emblem
- Interactive map of Hayashima
- Location in Japan
- Coordinates: 34°36′02″N 133°49′42″E
- Country: Japan
- Region: Chūgoku; San'yō
- Prefecture: Okayama
- District: Tsukubo

Government
  - Mayor: Tomohiko Sato

Area
  - Total: 7.62 km^{2} (2.94 sq mi)

Population (February 1, 2024)
  - Total: 12,772
  - Density: 1,680/km^{2} (4,340/sq mi)
- Time zone: UTC+09:00 (JST)
- City hall address: 360-1 Maegata, Hayashima-cho, Tsukubo-gun, Okayama-ken 701-0303
- Website: Official website
- Symbols
- Flower: Azalea
- Tree: Juniperus chinensis

Hayashima (早島町, Hayashima-chō) is a town located in Tsukubo District, Okayama Prefecture, Japan. As of 1 February 2024, the town had an estimated population of 12,772 in 5261 households and a population density of 1700 persons per km^{2}. The total area of the town is 7.62 square kilometres (2.94 sq mi), making it the smallest municipality in Okayama in terms of area, but also the most densely populated.

== Geography ==
Hayashima is located in south-central Okayama Prefecture, and belongs to the Okayama metropolitan employment zone. Surrounded by Okayama city, the prefectural capital, and Kurashiki city, the second largest city in the prefecture, it is a commuter town for both. As the town name suggests, it used to be an island before the Muromachi period, but due to land reclamation, it was connected to land. The southern part is reclaimed land that forms part of the Okayama Plain, and in the center there are hills that were once islands.

=== Neighboring municipalities ===
Okayama Prefecture

- Kita-ku, Okayama
- Kurashiki
- Minami-ku, Okayama

== Climate ==
Hayashima has a humid subtropical climate (Köppen Cfa) characterized by warm summers and cool winters with moderate snowfall. The average annual temperature in Hayashima is 16.0 °C. The average annual rainfall is 1355 mm with September as the wettest month. The temperatures are highest on average in January, at around 27.3 °C, and lowest in January, at around 5.4 °C.

== Demography ==
Per Japanese census data, the population of Hayashima has been as follows. The population has been steadily increasing since the 1970s.

Historical population
Year	Pop.	±%
1920	6,024	—
1930	6,455	+7.2%
1940	7,426	+15.0%
1950	9,474	+27.6%
1960	8,375	−11.6%
1970	8,352	−0.3%
1980	10,816	+29.5%
1990	11,634	+7.6%
2000	11,915	+2.4%
2010	12,218	+2.5%

== History ==
Hayashima is part of ancient Bitchū Province. During the Edo Period it was a 3000 koku hatamoto holding controlled by a cadet branch of the Togawa clan. After the Meiji restoration, the village of Hayashima was established with the creation of the modern municipalities system on June 1, 1889. It was raised to town status on February 26, 1896.

== Government ==
Hayashima has a mayor-council form of government with a directly elected mayor and a unicameral town council ten members. Hayashima, collectively with the city of Kurashiki, contributes 14 members to the Okayama Prefectural Assembly. In terms of national politics, the village is part of the Okayama 4th district of the lower house of the Diet of Japan.

== Economy ==
Hayashima is largely a commuter town and logistics distribution center, with some residual rice production. The town was traditionally noted for its production of tatami mats, but this industry has declined.

== Education ==
Hayashima has one public elementary school and one public junior high school operated by the town government. The town does not have a high school. The Okayama Prefectural Board of Education also operates one special education school for the disabled.

== Transportation ==
=== Railway ===
JR West (JR West) - Uno Line

- Hayashima - Kuguhara

JR West (JR West) - Seto-Ōhashi Line

- Hayashima - Kuguhara

=== Highways ===
- San'yō Expressway (Hayashima branch)
- Seto-Chūō Expressway
- National Route 2
