= Kinashi Station =

Railway station in Takamatsu, Kagawa Prefecture, Japan

Y02 Kinashi Station 鬼無駅
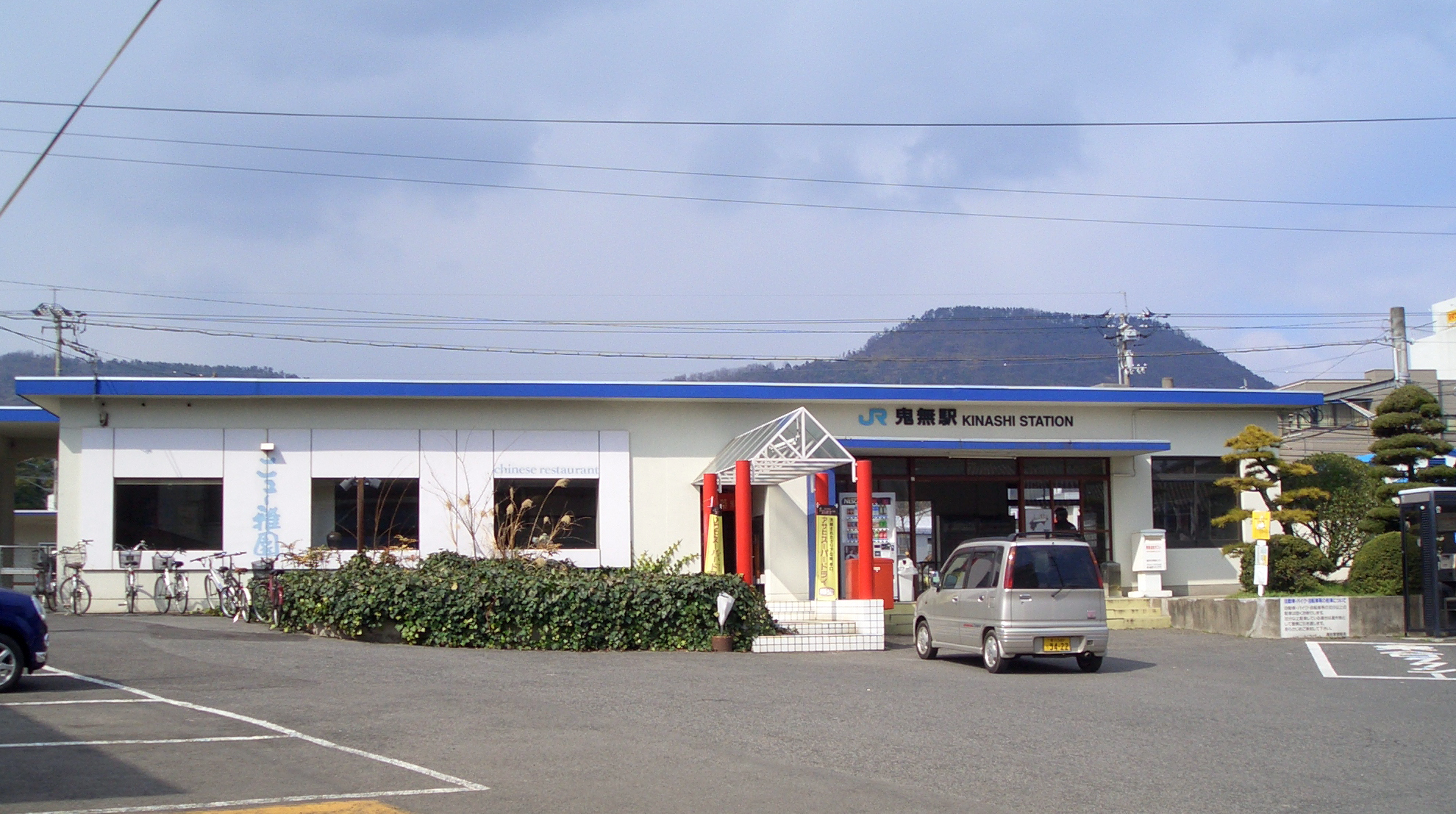
- Kinashi Station in 2007

General information
- Location: 17-2 Kinashi-chō Satō, Takamatsu-shi, Kagawa-ken 761-8023; Japan
- Coordinates: 34°19′32″N 133°59′38″E
- Operator: JR Shikoku
- Line: Yosan Line
- Distance: 6.1 km (3.8 mi) from Takamatsu
- Platforms: 2 side platforms
- Tracks: 2
- Connections: Bus stop

Construction
- Structure type: At grade
- Parking: Available
- Accessible: No - platforms linked by footbridge

Other information
- Status: Unstaffed
- Station code: Y02

History
- Opened: 21 February 1897; 129 years ago

Passengers
- FY2019: 652

Services
Preceding station	JR Shikoku	Following station
Hashioka Y03 towards Uwajima	Yosan Line	Kōzai Y01 towards Takamatsu
Limited Express
Hashioka Y03 towards Okayama	Marine Liner	Takamatsu Y00 Terminus
Uzushio does not stop here
Rapid
Hashioka Y03 towards Iyo-Saijō	Sunport	Takamatsu Y00 Terminus
Location
- Location within Kagawa Prefecture Location within Japan

Kinashi Station (鬼無駅, Kinashi-eki) is a passenger railway station located in the city of Takamatsu, Kagawa Prefecture, Japan. It is operated by JR Shikoku and has the station number "Y02".

== Lines ==
The station is served by the JR Shikoku Yosan Line and is located 6.1 km from the beginning of the line at Takamatsu. Yosan line local, Rapid Sunport, and Nanpū Relay services stop at the station. Some trains of the Marine Liner rapid service on the Seto-Ohashi Line between Okayama and Takamatsu also stop at the station. Although Tadotsu is the official start of the Dosan Line, some of its local trains start from and return to Takamatsu. These trains also stop at Kinashi.

== Layout ==
Kinashi Station consists of two opposed side platforms serving two tracks. Access to the opposite platform is by means of a footbridge. Parking is available at the station forecourt. The station's ticket window is unstaffed but a Chinese restaurant in the station building acts as a kan'i itaku agent and sells some types of tickets.

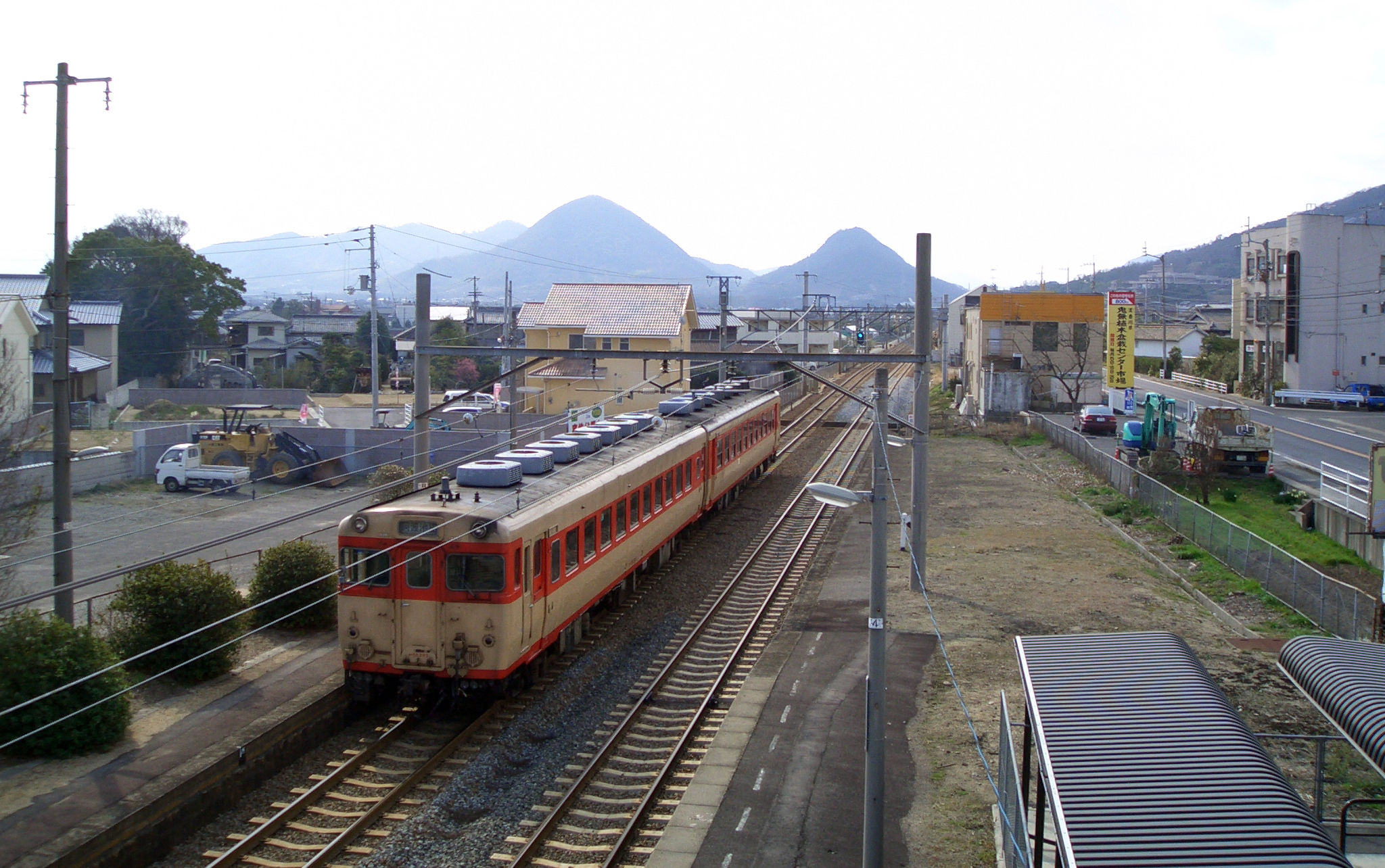
Train at Kinashi Station

== Adjacent stations ==
«	Service	»
Takamatsu	Rapid Nanpū Relay	Hashioka

== History ==
Kinashi Station opened on 21 February 1897 as an intermediate stop when the track of the privately Sanuki Railway (later the Sanyo Railway) was extended from Marugame to Takamatsu. After the railway as nationalized on 1 December 1906, Japanese Government Railways (JGR) took over the station and operated it as part of the Sanuki Line (later the Sanyo and then the Yosan Main Line). With the privatization of Japanese National Railways (JNR, the successor of JGR) on 1 April 1987, control of the station passed to JR Shikoku.

== Surrounding area ==
- Takamatsu Municipal Kinashi Elementary School
- Kagawa Prefectural Takamatsu Nishi High School
- Kagawa Seiryo Junior and Senior High School

== See also ==
- List of railway stations in Japan
