= Kitanagase Station =

Railway station in Okayama, Japan

Kitanagase Station 北長瀬駅
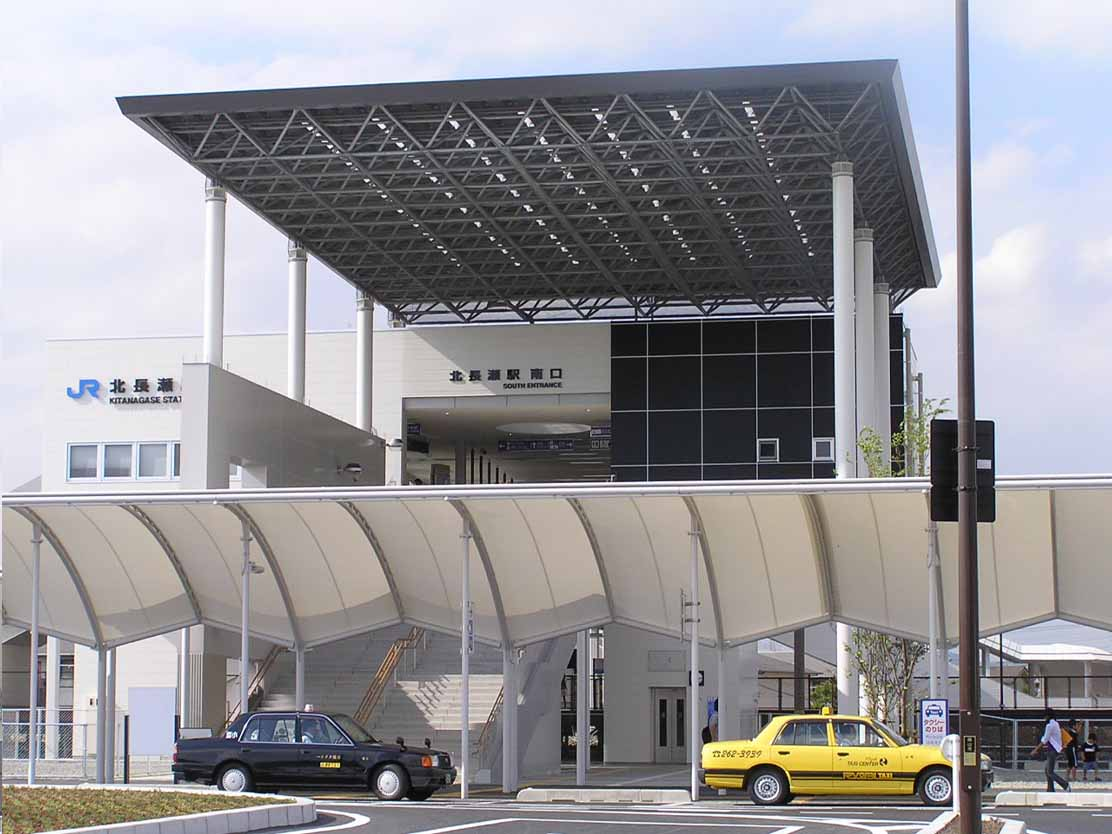
- Kitanagase Station south entrance in October 2005

General information
- Location: 2-17 Kitanagase-omotemachi, Kita-ku, Okayama-shi, Okayama-ken 700-0962; Japan
- Coordinates: 34°39′10.92″N 133°53′7.87″E
- Owner: West Japan Railway Company
- Operator: West Japan Railway Company
- Lines: W San'yō Main Line; (V Hakubi Line)
- Distance: 146.8 km (91.2 miles) from Kōbe
- Platforms: 2 side platforms
- Connections: Bus stop

Other information
- Status: Staffed ( Midori no Madoguchi)
- Station code: JR-W02（San'yō Main Line）; JR-V02（Hakubi Line）
- Website: Official website

History
- Opened: 1 October 2005; 20 years ago

Passengers
- FY2019: 4715 daily

Services
Preceding station	JR West	Following station
Niwase towards Fukuyama	San'yō Line Local	Okayama Terminus
Location
- Location within Okayama Prefecture Location within Japan

Kitanagase Station (北長瀬駅, Kitanagase-eki) is a passenger railway station located in Kita-ku of the city of Okayama, Okayama Prefecture, Japan. It is operated by West Japan Railway Company (JR West).

== Lines ==
Kitanagase Station is served by the San'yō Main Line, and is located 146.8 kilometers from the terminus of the line at Kōbe and 3.4 kilometers from Okayama. It is also served by trains of the Hakubi Line, which continue past the nominal terminus of that line at Kurashiki to terminate at Okayama.

== Station layout ==
The station consists of two opposed side platforms, connected by an elevated station building.The station building has a white-based appearance, and has a large roof over the wide south exit stairs. It is equipped with an elevator and a wheelchair-accessible restroom, making it barrier-free. The outbound platform is curved to match the tracks, and the train is tilting toward the platform Between the two passenger tracks lines, there is an outbound pull-up track for Okayama Freight Terminal, and freight train shunting work is often carried out. The station has a Midori no Madoguchi staffed ticket office.

=== Platforms ===
1	■ W San'yō Main Line	for Fukuyama
1	■ V Hakubi Line	for Sōja and Bitchū-Takahashi
2	■ W San'yō Main Line	for Okayama
2	■ V Hakubi Line	for Okayama

== History ==
Kitanagase Station opened on October 1, 2005, on the site of the former Japan National Railways Okayama Switchyard.

== Passenger statistics ==
In fiscal 2019, the station was used by an average of 4715 passengers daily.

== Surrounding area ==
- Okayama Dome
- Okayama Seibu General Park
- Okayama Municipal Hospital
- Okayama Prefectural Okayama Daianji Secondary School

== See also ==
- List of railway stations in Japan
