= Kōzai Station =

Railway station in Takamatsu, Kagawa Prefecture, Japan

Y01 Kōzai Station 香西駅
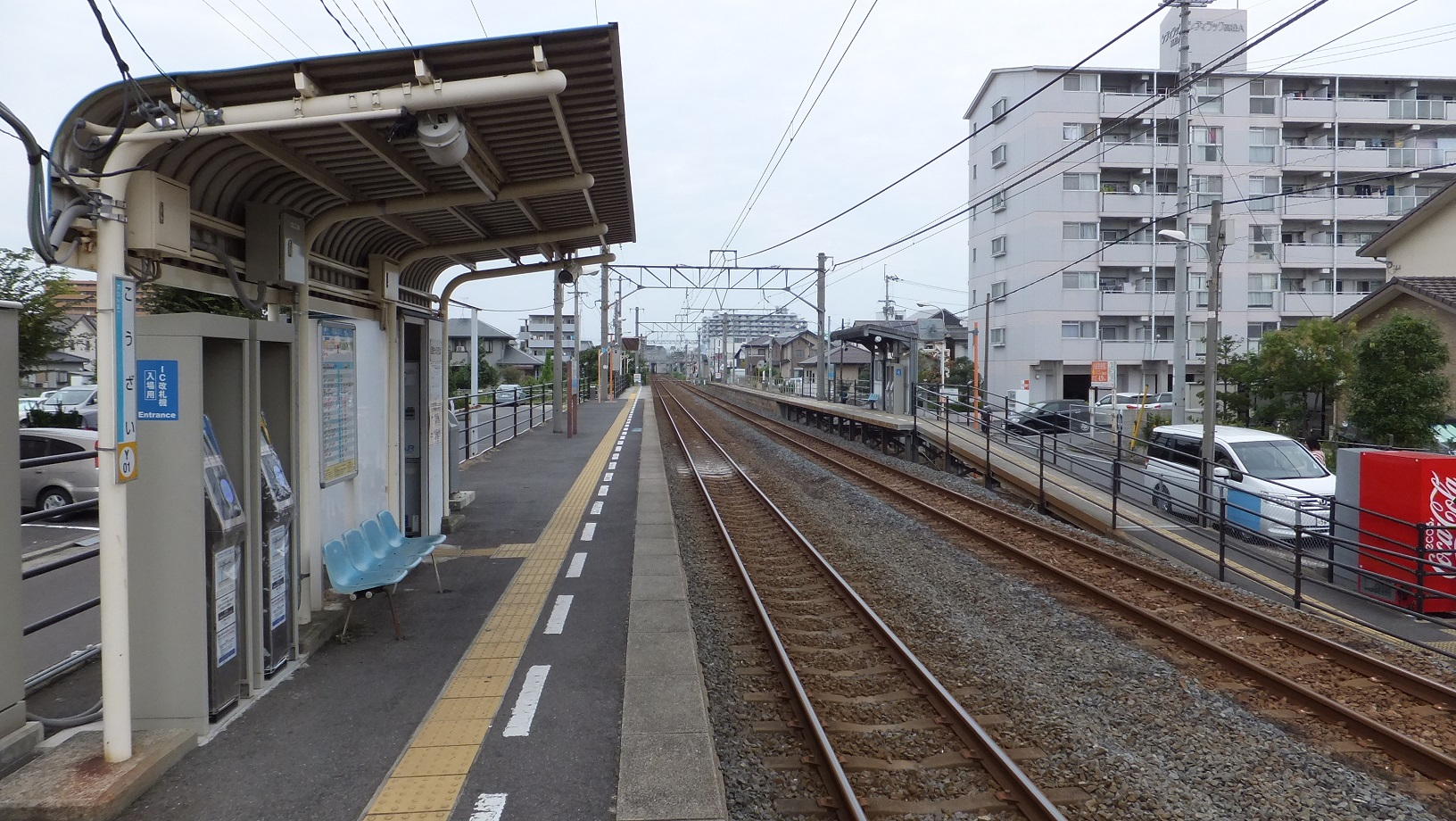
- Kōzai Station in 2015

General information
- Location: Tsuruichicho, Takamatsu City, Kagawa Prefecture 761-8032; Japan
- Coordinates: 34°20′27″N 134°00′34″E
- Operator: JR Shikoku
- Line: Yosan Line
- Distance: 3.4 km (2.1 mi) from Takamatsu
- Platforms: 2 side platforms
- Tracks: 2

Construction
- Structure type: At grade
- Cycle facilities: Designated parking area for bikes
- Accessible: Yes - ramps lead up to platform

Other information
- Status: Unstaffed
- Station code: Y01

History
- Opened: 27 January 1952; 74 years ago

Passengers
- FY2019: 569

Services
Preceding station	JR Shikoku	Following station
Kinashi Y02 towards Uwajima	Yosan Line	Takamatsu Y00 Terminus
Limited Express
Uzushio does not stop here
Rapid
Marine Liner does not stop here
Sunport does not stop here
Location
- Location within Kagawa Prefecture Location within Japan

Kōzai Station (香西駅, Kōzai-eki) is a passenger railway station located in the city of Takamatsu, Kagawa Prefecture, Japan. It is operated by JR Shikoku and has the station number "Y01".

== Lines ==
The station is served by the JR Shikoku Yosan Line and is located 3.4 km from the beginning of the line at Takamatsu. Only the local service on the Yosan Line stop at the station. Although Tadotsu is the official start of the Dosan Line, some of its local trains start from and return to Takamatsu. These trains also stop at Kōzai.

== Layout ==
Kōzai Station consists of two staggered side platforms serving two tracks. There is no station building but each platform has a shelter and ticket vending machines. From the access road, separate ramps lead up to each platform. A designated area for the parking of bicycles is provided near the station.

== History ==
Japanese National Railways (JNR) opened Kōzai Station on 27 January 1952 as an added station on the existing Yosan Line. With the privatization of JNR on 1 April 1987, control of the station passed to JR Shikoku.

== Surrounding area ==
- Kagawa Prefectural Police Headquarters Driver's License Center
- Takamatsu City Katsuga Junior High School

== See also ==
- List of railway stations in Japan
