= Chayamachi Station =

Railway station in Kurashiki, Okayama Prefecture, Japan

Coordinates: 34°34′37″N 133°49′33″E

Chayamachi Station 茶屋町駅
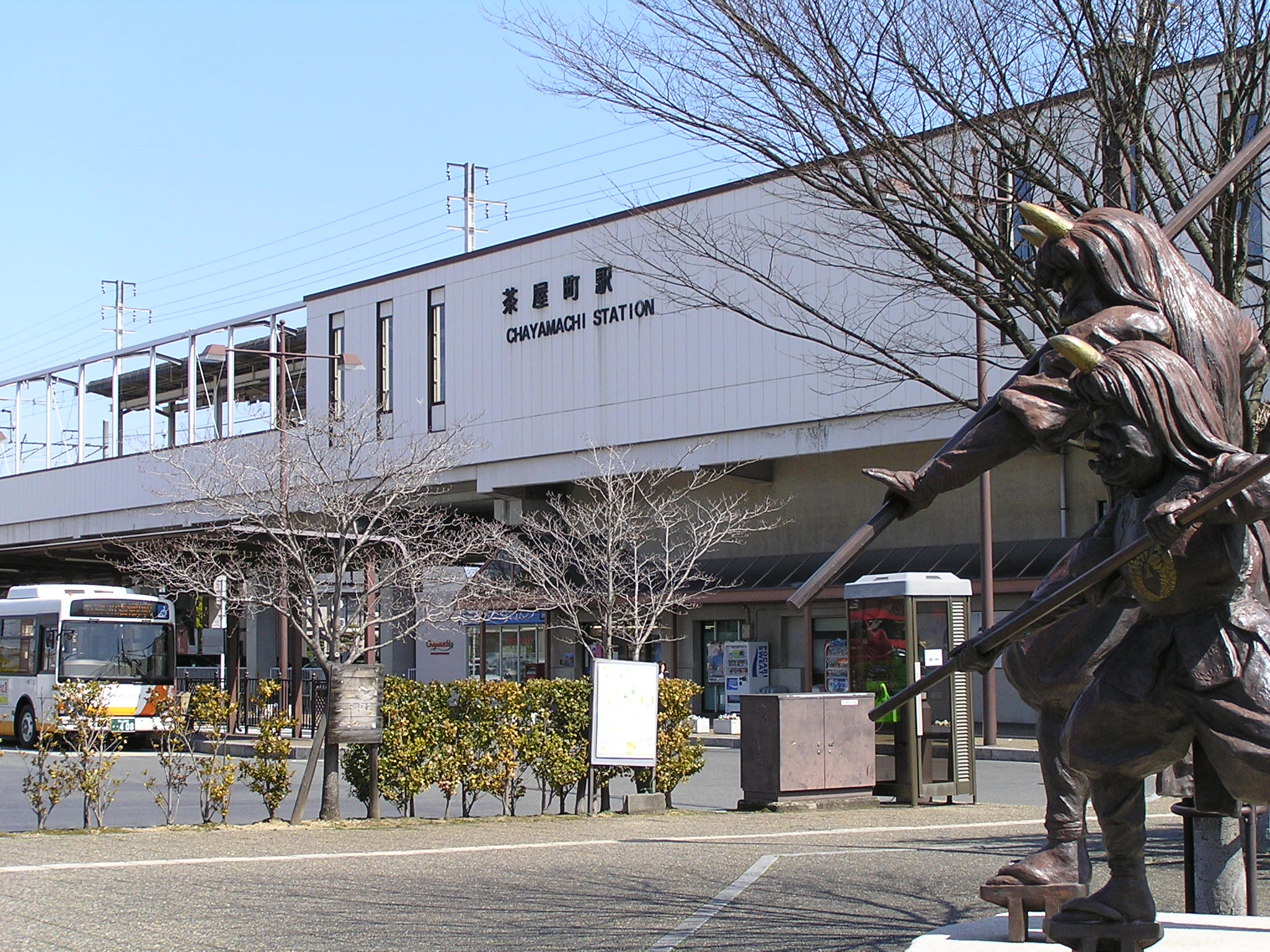
- Station building

General information
- Location: 478 Chayamachi, Kurashiki City, Okayama Prefecture; Japan
- Operated by: JR West
- Lines: M Honshi-Bisan Line (Seto-Ōhashi Line); M Seto-Ōhashi Line; L Honshi-Bisan Line
- Platforms: 2 island platforms
- Tracks: 3

Construction
- Structure type: Elevated

Other information
- Station code: JR-M08; JR-L08

History
- Opened: 12 June 1910; 115 years ago

Passengers
- 2019 (Daily): 3,850

Services
Preceding station	JR West	Following station
Uematsu towards Kojima	Seto-Ōhashi Line	Kuguhara towards Okayama
Hikosaki towards Uno	Uno Line	Kuguhara towards Okayama
Preceding station	JR Shikoku	Following station
Uzushio does not stop here
Location

Chayamachi Station (茶屋町駅, Chayamachi-eki) is a railway station in Kurashiki, Okayama Prefecture, Japan.

== Lines ==
- West Japan Railway Company
  - Uno Line
  - Honshi-Bisan Line

== Station Layout ==
Chayamachi Station has 2 island platforms that serve 3 tracks.

Platform No	Line Name	Direction	Notes
1	M Seto-Ōhashi Line; L Uno Line	for Okayama	Some trains leave from Platform 2
2・3	L Uno Line	for Uno	some trains leave from Platform 4
4	M Seto-Ōhashi Line	for Kojima・Shikoku	some trains leave from Platform 3

== Adjacent stations ==
«	Service	»
Honshi-Bishan Line
Hayashima	Rapid Marine Liner	Uematsu
