= Kojima Station =

Railway station in Kurashiki, Okayama Prefecture, Japan

Kojima Station 児島駅
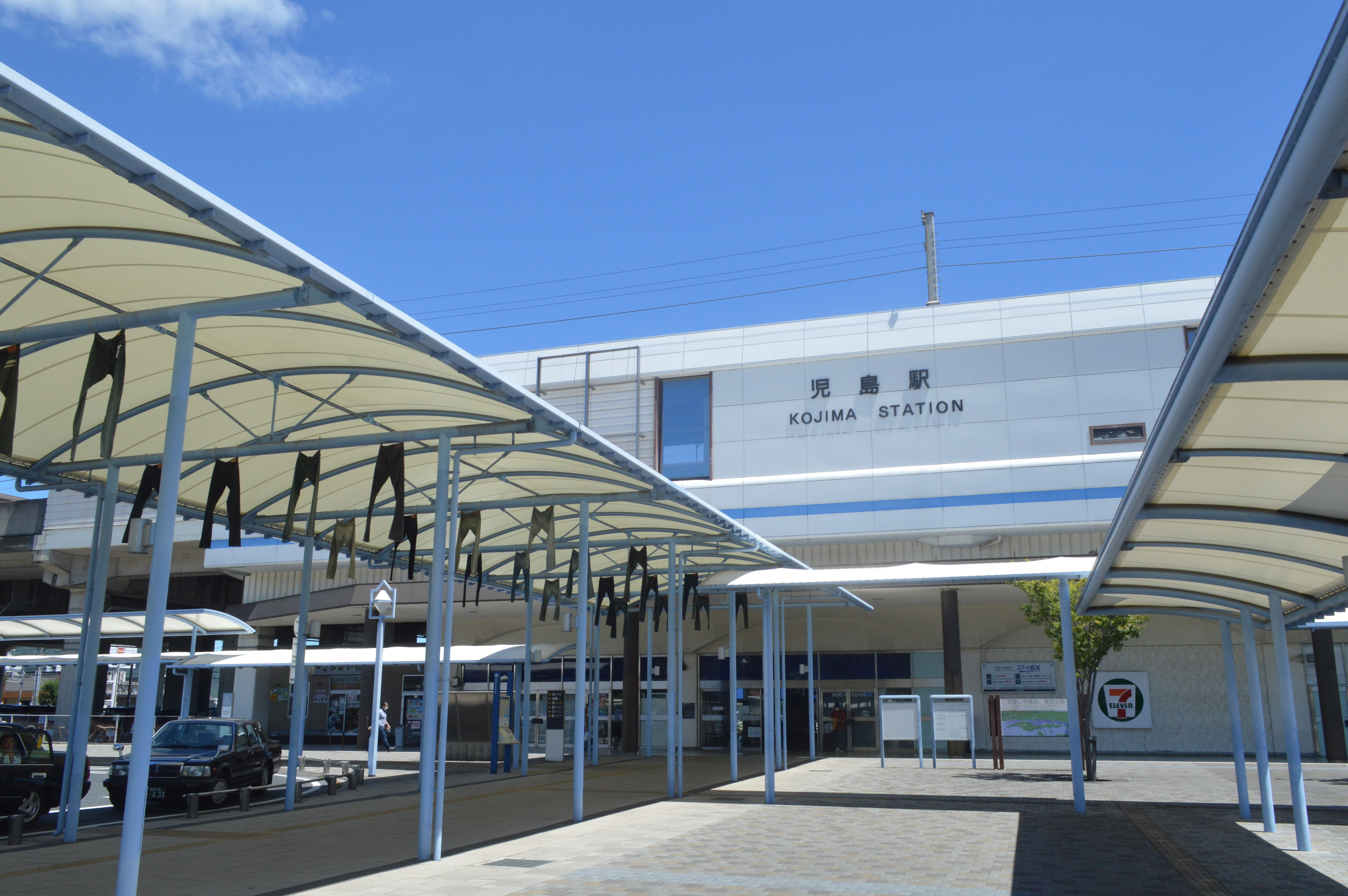
- The station building

General information
- Location: 1-107 Kojima Ekimae, Kurashiki City, Okayama Prefecture; Japan
- Coordinates: 34°27′45.22″N 133°48′28.11″E
- Operator: JR West; JR Shikoku
- Line: M Honshi-Bisan Line
- Distance: 12.9 km (8.0 mi) from Chayamachi
- Platforms: 2 island platforms
- Tracks: 4

Construction
- Structure type: Elevated

Other information
- Station code: JR-M12

History
- Opened: 20 March 1988; 38 years ago

Passengers
- 2019: 4,553 daily (Boarding only)

Services
Preceding station	JR West	Following station
Utazu Y09 Terminus	Honshi-Bisan Line	Kaminochō towards Chayamachi
Location
- Location within Okayama Prefecture Location within Japan

Kojima Station (児島駅, Kojima-eki) is a railway station on the Honshi-Bisan Line in Kurashiki, Okayama Prefecture, Japan, jointly operated by West Japan Railway Company (JR West) and Shikoku Railway Company (JR Shikoku).

== Lines ==
Kojima Station is served by the Honshi-Bisan Line, and is the last stop in Honshu before the Great Seto Bridge for the Island of Shikoku.

== Station layout ==
Kojima Station has 2 platforms that serve 4 tracks

Platform No	Line Name	Direction	Notes
1	Seto-Ōhashi Line	for Chayamachi・Okayama	Used by Local Trains
2	Seto-Ōhashi Line	for Chayamachi・Okayama	Used by Rapid and Limited Express trains
3	Seto-Ōhashi Line	for Shikoku(Takamatsu・Matsuyama Station・Kochi・Tokushima)	All regular trains use this platform
4	Seto-Ōhashi Line	for Shikoku(Takamatsu・Matsuyama Station・Kochi・Tokushima)	No regular down trains arrive or depart after March 16, 2019
4	Seto-Ōhashi Line	for Chayamachi・Okayama	Used by Local Trains

== Adjacent stations ==
«	Service	»
Honshi-Bisan Line
Okayama	Sleeper Limited Express Sunrise Seto	Sakaide
Okayama	Limited Express Uzushio / Shiokaze	Utazu
Kaminochō	Rapid Marine Liner	Sakaide

== History ==
The station opened on 20 March 1988.

== See also ==
- List of railway stations in Japan
