= Uno Station =

Railway station in Tamano, Okayama Prefecture, Japan

Uno Station 宇野駅
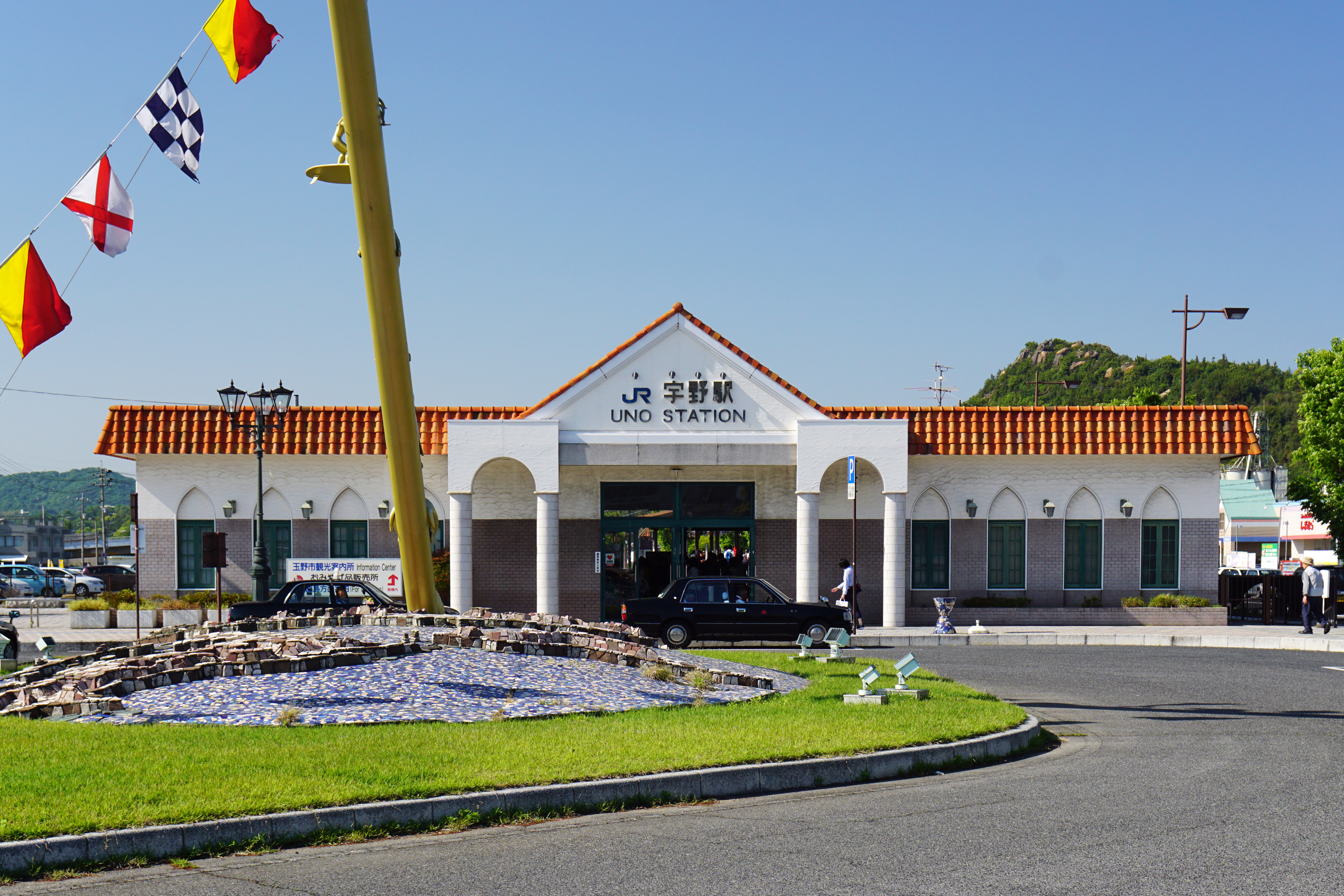
- Uno Station, May 2015

General information
- Location: 1-chōme-1 Chikkō, Tamano-shi, Okayama-ken 706-0002; Japan
- Coordinates: 34°29′41″N 133°57′14″E
- Owner: West Japan Railway Company
- Operator: West Japan Railway Company
- Line: L Uno Line
- Distance: 32.8 km (20.4 miles) from Okayama
- Platforms: 2 island platforms
- Tracks: 2
- Connections: Bus stop

Other information
- Status: Staffed
- Station code: JR-L15
- Website: Official website

History
- Opened: June 12, 1910

Passengers
- FY2019: 1309 daily
Location
- Location within Okayama Prefecture Location within Japan

Uno Station (宇野駅, Uno-eki) is a passenger railway station located in the city of Tamano, Okayama Prefecture, Japan, operated by the West Japan Railway Company (JR West). The station was formerly the start of a Japan National Railways ferry that went over the Seto Inland Sea to Takamatsu Station before the Great Seto Bridge was built.

== Lines ==
Uno Station is the terminus of the JR Uno Line, and is located 32.8 kilometers from the opposing terminus of the line at Okayama and 17.9 kilometers from Chayamachi.

== Station layout ==
The station consists of two ground-level dead-headed island platforms, one of which is not in operation. The station is staffed.

=== Platforms ===
1, 2	■ Uno Line	for Chayamachi, Okayama

== Adjacent stations ==
«	Service	»
JR West Uno Line
Bizen-Tai	Local	Terminus

== History ==
Uno Station was opened on 12 June 1910. With the privatization of Japanese National Railways (JNR) on 1 April 1987, the station came under the control of JR West.

== Passenger statistics ==
In FY2019, the station was used by an average of 1309 passengers daily.

== Surrounding area ==
- Tamano City Tourist Information Center
- Tamano Chamber of Commerce and Industry
- Tamano City Hall

== See also ==
- List of railway stations in Japan
