= Okayama Station =

Major railway station in Okayama, Japan

L 01 M 01 N 01 S 01 U 01 V 01 W 01 Okayama Station 岡山駅
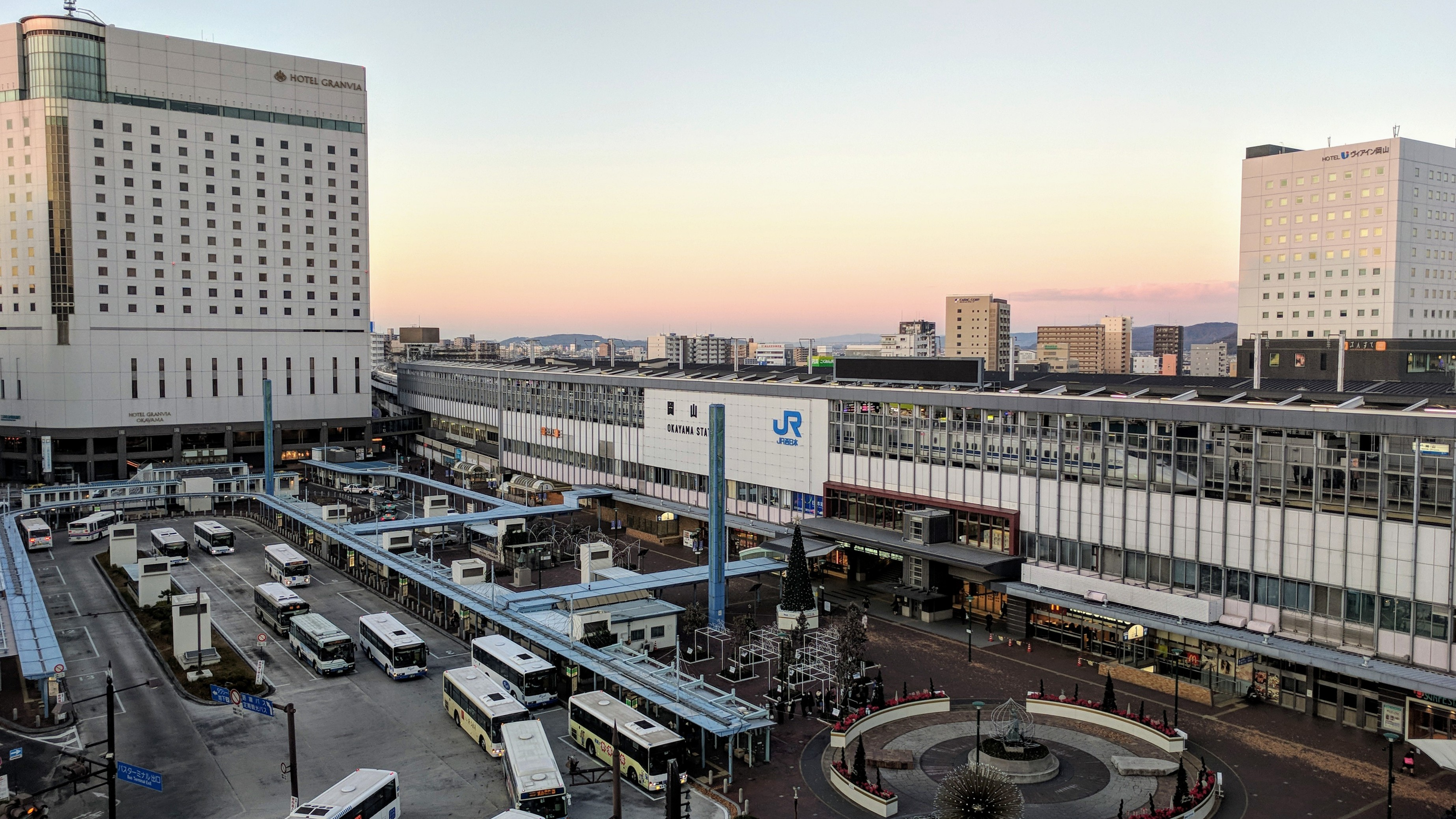
- East side complex of Okayama Station facing southwest

General information
- Location: Kita-ku, Okayama, Okayama Prefecture; Japan
- Coordinates: 34°39′59″N 133°55′07″E
- Operator: JR West
- Lines: San'yō Shinkansen; L Uno Line; M Seto-Ōhashi Line; N Akō Line; S W San'yō Line; T Tsuyama Line; U Kibi Line; V Hakubi Line
- Platforms: 2 island platforms (Shinkansen); 4 island platforms (Conventional lines)
- Tracks: 4 (Shinkansen); 10 (conventional lines)
- Connections: Okayama Electric Tramway

Construction
- Structure type: Elevated

Other information
- Website: Official website

History
- Opened: 18 March 1891; 135 years ago

Passengers
- 2020: 46,763 daily
Services
Preceding station	JR West	Following station
Fukuyama towards Hakata	San'yō Shinkansen Mizuho	Himeji towards Shin-Ōsaka
Fukuyama towards Hakata	San'yō Shinkansen Sakura	Himeji towards Shin-Ōsaka
Fukuyama towards Hakata	San'yō Shinkansen Nozomi	Himeji towards Shin-Ōsaka
Shin-Kurashiki towards Hakata	San'yō Shinkansen Hikari	Himeji towards Shin-Ōsaka
Shin-Kurashiki towards Hakata or Hakataminami	San'yō Shinkansen Kodama	Aioi towards Shin-Ōsaka
Location
- Location within Okayama Prefecture Location within Japan

Okayama Station (岡山駅, Okayama-eki) is a major railway station in Kita-ku, Okayama, Okayama Prefecture, Japan. The station is operated by West Japan Railway Company (JR West).

== Lines ==
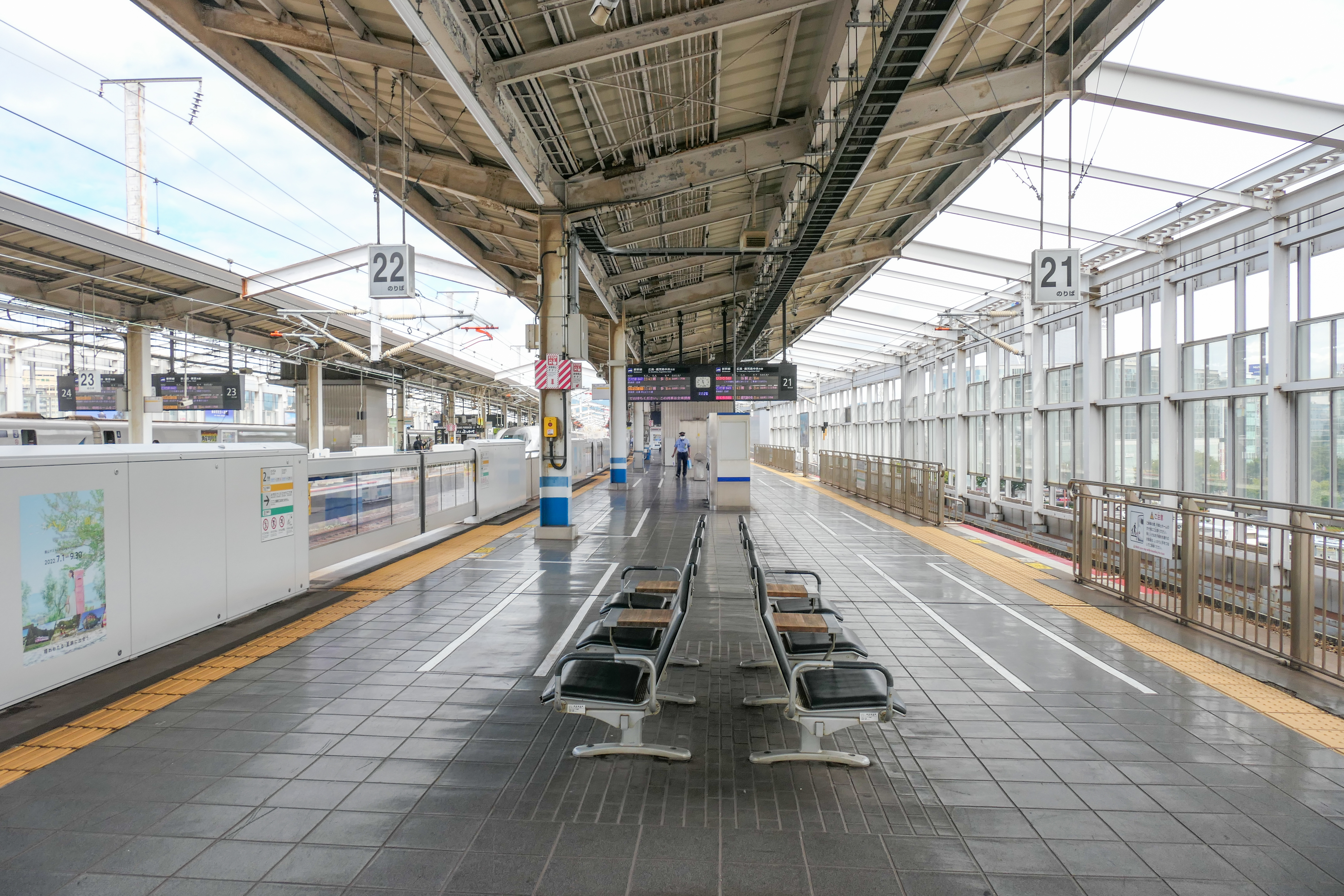
Shinkansen platforms 21 and 22

Route map of trains departing from Okayama Station

Okayama Station is one of the major intersections of railways in the Chūgoku region. All trains connecting Honshū and Shikoku via the Great Seto Bridge originate and terminate here.

The station is served by the following JR West lines:

- Sanyō Shinkansen
- San'yō Main Line (including trains to Akō Line and Hakubi Line)
- Uno Line (Seto-Ōhashi Line)
- Tsuyama Line
- Kibi Line

In addition to the JR lines, a tram stop of the Okayama Electric Tramway named Okayama-Ekimae is located in front of the JR station.

== Station layout ==
The Shinkansen platforms are located on the 3rd level of the station and has 2 island platforms that serve 4 tracks, whilst the conventional lines on the ground floor have 4 island platforms that serve 10 tracks. All platforms. Platforms 5 and 7 are bay platforms near tracks 6 and 8. In 2004, the Tsuyama and Kibi Line platforms (Platforms 16 and 17 at the time) were moved over to the west side of Okayama Station due to renovations, and the shape and size of all platforms have changed since 2004.

The station building is one of the few stations whose front exit is the Shinkansen exit. It was converted to a bridge in October 2006, and its main functions, including Shinkansen communication, are installed on the second floor. In addition, the west exit station building was abolished due to the construction of the east-west connecting road, and the ticket gates were concentrated on the second floor and underground except for some. Many of the long concourses under the elevated tracks that once existed are now commercial facilities.

This station has a station master that is also the station master for the Sanyo Main Line stations of Kitanagase and Niwase, the Uno Line Stations of Ōmoto through Kuguhara, the Kibi Line stations of Bizen-Mikado through Bitchū-Takamatsu, and the Tsuyama Line stations of Hōkaiin through Fukuwatari.

Prior to this, Kitanagase and Niwase stations were controlled by Kurashiki and Nakashō stations, Omoto through Kuguhara Stations on the Uno line were controlled by Kojima station, Each station on the Kibi Line was managed by the Bitchu Railway Department (after the abolition, Niimi Station [management station] and Soja Station [district station]), but it was changed from the policy of matching with the administrative area in principle.

Platform No	Line Name	Direction	Notes
1・2	W San'yō Line	for Kurashiki・Fukuyama・Hiroshima	Formerly used by Rapid Sun Liner services
1・2	V Hakubi Line	for Kurashiki ・Bitchū-Takahashi・Niimi・Yonago	Used by Limited Express Yakumo servies
3・4	S San'yō Line	for Wake・Himeji・Tottori	Used by Limited Express Super Inaba services
3・4	N Akō Line	for Saidaiji・Banshū-Akō	
5	M Seto-Ōhashi Line; L Uno Line	for Chayamachi ・Kojima・Takamatsu・Uno	Used by some Local and Rapid services
6・8	M Seto-Ōhashi Line; L Uno Line	for Chayamachi ・Kojima・Takamatsu・Uno	Used by Rapid Marine Liner, Limited Express, and the Sleeper Limited Express Sunrise Seto services
7	M Seto-Ōhashi Line; L Uno Line	for Chayamachi ・Kojima・Takamatsu・Uno	Used by all local trains and some temporary rapid services
9	T Tsuyama Line	for Fukuwatari ・Tsuyama	Used by Local and Rapid Kotobuki services
10	U Kibi Line (Momotaro Line)	for Bitchū-Takamatsu・Soja	
21・22	San'yō Shinkansen	for Hiroshima・Hakata・Kagoshima-Chūō	
23・24	San'yō Shinkansen	for Shin-Ōsaka・Nagoya・Tokyo	

== Adjacent stations ==
«	Service	»
Sanyo Main Line
Himeji	Sleeper Limited Express Sunrise Seto / Sunrise Izumo	(Sunrise Seto) Kojima (Sunrise Izumo) Kurashiki
Himeji	West Express Ginga	Kurashiki
Kamigori	Limited Express Super Inaba	Terminus
Kurashiki	Limited Express Yakumo	Terminus
Nishigawara	Local	Kitanagase
Seto-Ōhashi Line
Terminus	Limited Express Nanpū	Kojima
Terminus	Limited Express Shiokaze	Kojima
Terminus	Rapid Marine Liner	Ōmoto
Terminus	Local	Ōmoto
Tsuyama Line
Terminus	Rapid Kotobuki	Hōkaiin
Terminus	Local	Hōkaiin
Kibi Line
Terminus	Local	Bizen-Mikado

== History ==
The station opened on March 18, 1891. Between 1972 and 1975, the station was the western terminus of the Sanyō Shinkansen.

Prior to the timetable revision on March 15, 2025, two daily Uzushio services also ran between Okayama and Tokushima.
