= Minami-ku, Okayama =

Minami 南区
- Ward of Okayama
- 南区• Minami-ku
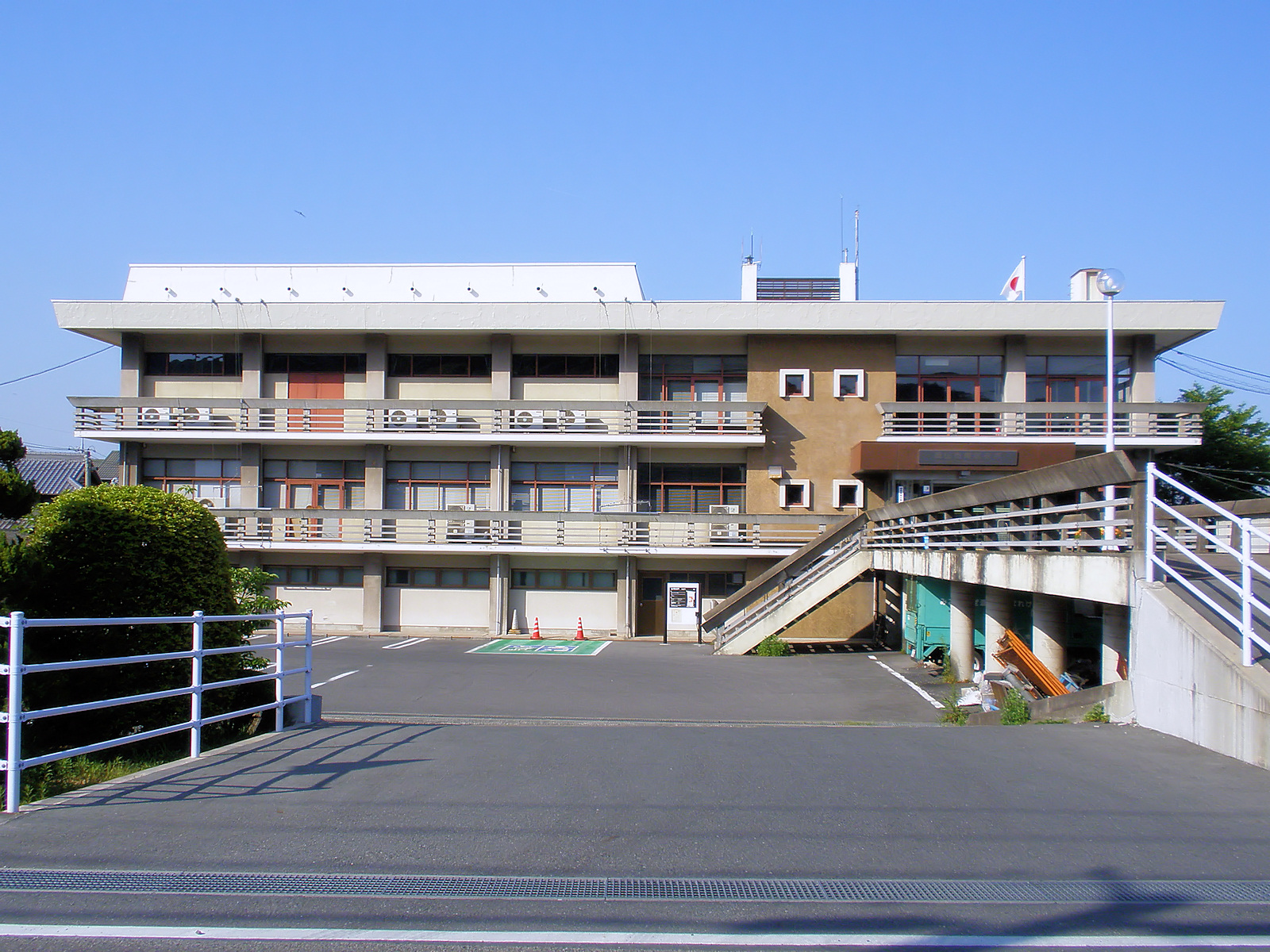
- Ward office of Minami-ku

- Location of Minami-ku in Okayama

- Coordinates: 34°32′38″N 133°51′55″E
- Country: Japan
- Region: Chūgoku
- Prefecture: Okayama
- City: Okayama

Area
  - Total: 127.36 km^{2} (49.17 sq mi)

Population
  - Total: 165,193
  - Density: 1,297/km^{2} (3,360/sq mi)
- Time zone: UTC+9 (Japan Standard Time)
- Address: 207 Kataoka, Minami-ku, Okayama, Okayama Prefecture; 709-1292
- Website: Official website of Minami-ku

Minami-ku (南区) is one of four wards of Okayama, Okayama Prefecture, Japan. The ward has an area of 127.36 km^{2} and a population of 165,193. The population density is 1,297 per km^{2}. The name means "South Ward."

The wards of Okayama were established when Okayama became a city designated by government ordinance on April 1, 2009.
