= JR Shikoku 5000 series =

Japanese train type

5000 series
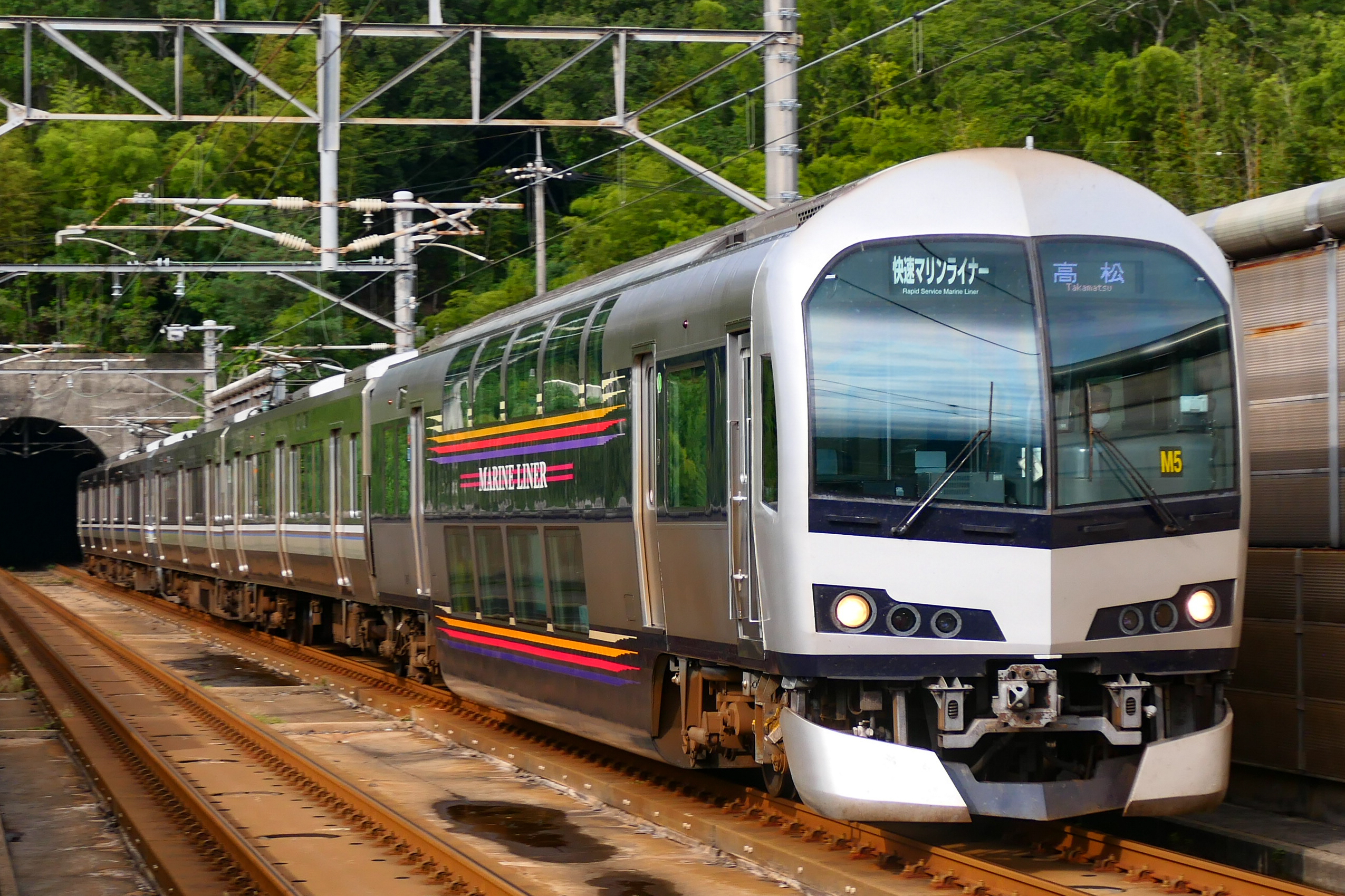
- A 5000 series on a Marine Liner rapid service in September 2022
- In service: October 2003–Present
- Manufacturers: Kawasaki Heavy Industries (5000, 5200); Tokyu Car Corporation (5100)
- Built at: Kobe, Hyōgo Prefecture; Yokohama, Kanagawa Prefecture
- Replaced: 213 series
- Constructed: 2003
- Number in service: 18 vehicles (6 sets)
- Formation: 3 cars per trainset
- Fleet numbers: M1–M6
- Operator: JR Shikoku
- Depot: Takamatsu
- Line served: Seto-Ōhashi Line

Specifications
- Car body construction: Stainless steel
- Car length: 20,100 mm (65 ft 11 in); 20,860 mm (68 ft 5 in) (5100)
- Width: 2,950 mm (9 ft 8 in)
- Height: 3,640 mm (11 ft 11 in); 4,070 mm (13 ft 4 in) (5100)
- Maximum speed: 130 km/h (81 mph)
- Traction system: Variable frequency (IGBT)
- Acceleration: 2.5 km/(h⋅s) (1.6 mph/s)
- Deceleration: 4.3 km/(h⋅s) (2.7 mph/s) (service); 5.2 km/(h⋅s) (3.2 mph/s) (emergency)
- Electric system: 1,500 V DC overhead catenary
- Current collection: S-PS60 scissors-type pantograph
- Bogies: S-DT63 (Mc); S-TR63 (T); S-TR64 (Tswc)
- Braking systems: Regenerative brake, electronically controlled pneumatic brakes
- Safety system: ATS-SS
- Coupling system: Shibata-Type
- Multiple working: 223 series
- Track gauge: 1,067 mm (3 ft 6 in)

Notes/references
- This train won the 47th Blue Ribbon Award in 2004. ※ Awarded for 5100 type bilevel cab car

The 5000 series (5000系) is a suburban electric multiple unit (EMU) train type operated by Shikoku Railway Company (JR Shikoku) in Shikoku, Japan.

Seven 2-car sets were introduced in 2003 by JR Shikoku along with the JR West 223-5000 series. 223–2000 series cars were later added to each set, and these were renumbered 5201 to 5207.

The 5100 type bilevel cab cars received the 47th Blue Ribbon Award in 2004.

== Operations ==
=== JR Shikoku ===
- Seto-Ōhashi Line (Marine Liner)
  - Yosan Line (Takamatsu - Utazu)
  - Honshi-Bisan Line (Utazu - Kojima)

=== JR West ===
- Seto-Ōhashi Line (Marine Liner)
  - Honshi-Bisan Line (Kojima - Chayamachi)
  - Uno Line (Chayamachi - Okayama)

== Formation ==
Trainsets are formed as follows.

Car No.	1	2	3
Designation	Tswc	T	Mc
Numbering	5100	5200	5000

Car 3 is equipped with one S-PS60 scissors-type pantograph.

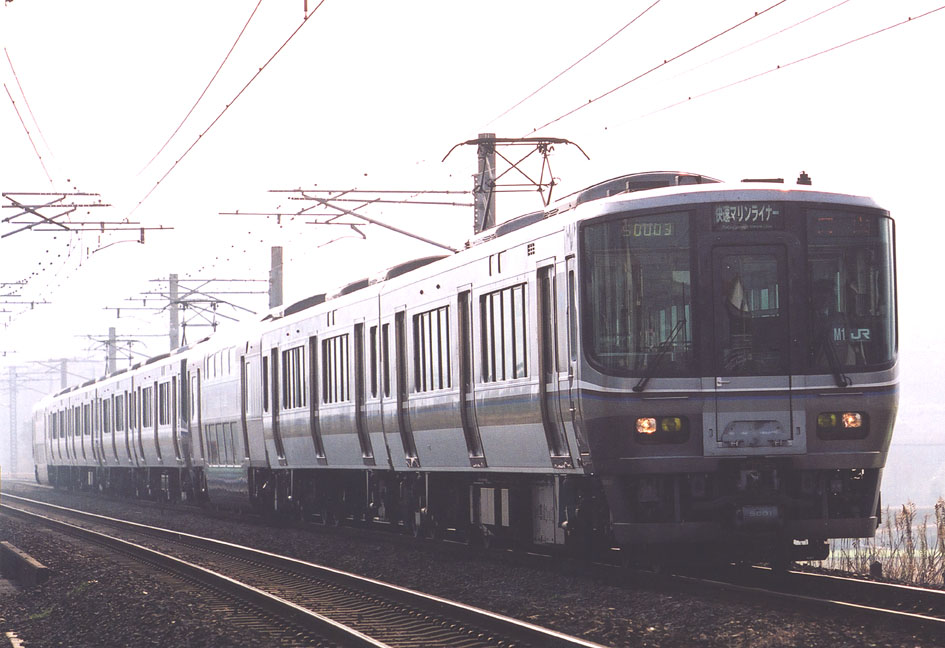
5000 type cab car

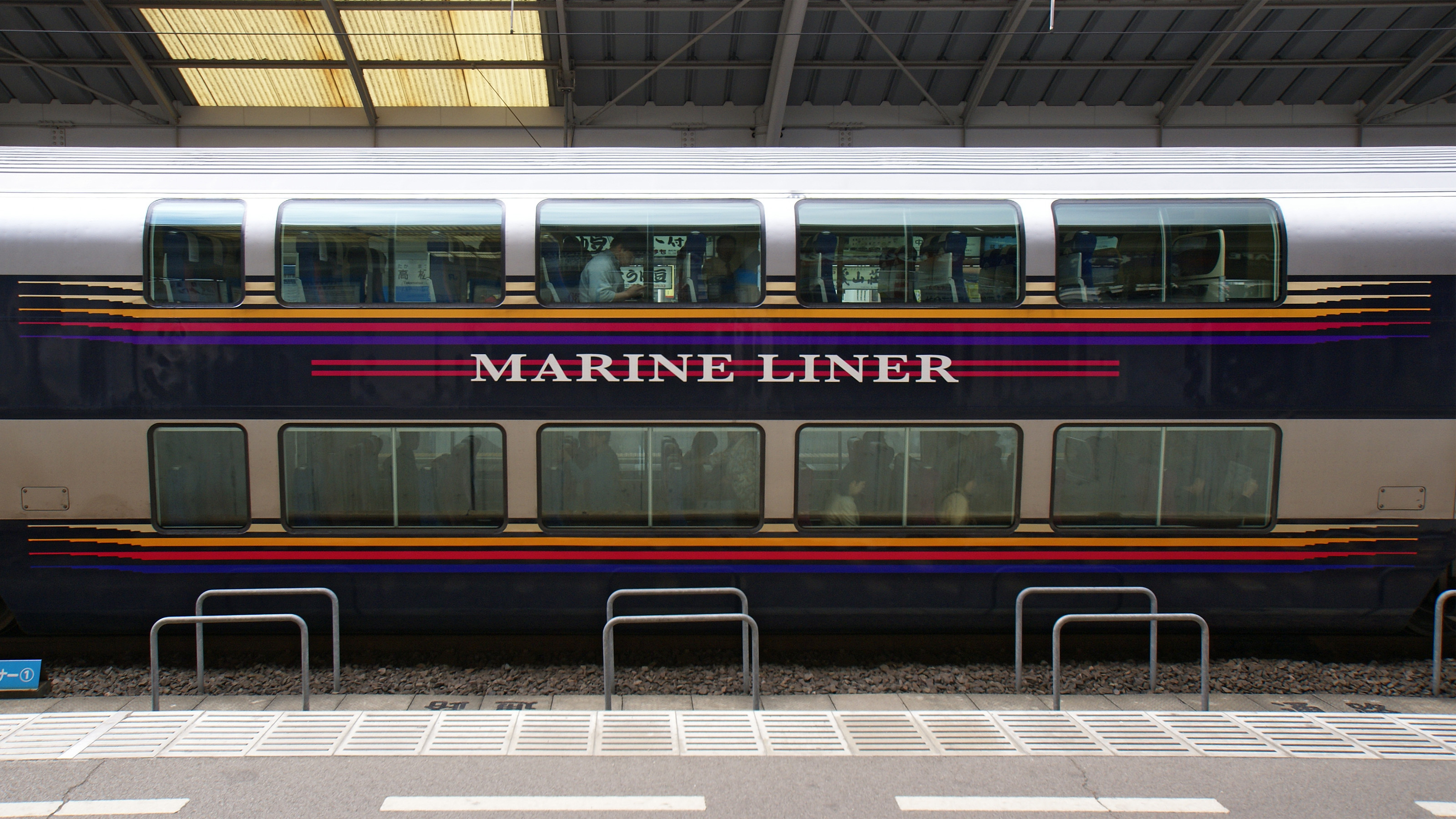
Side view (5100 bilevel cab car)

== Interior ==
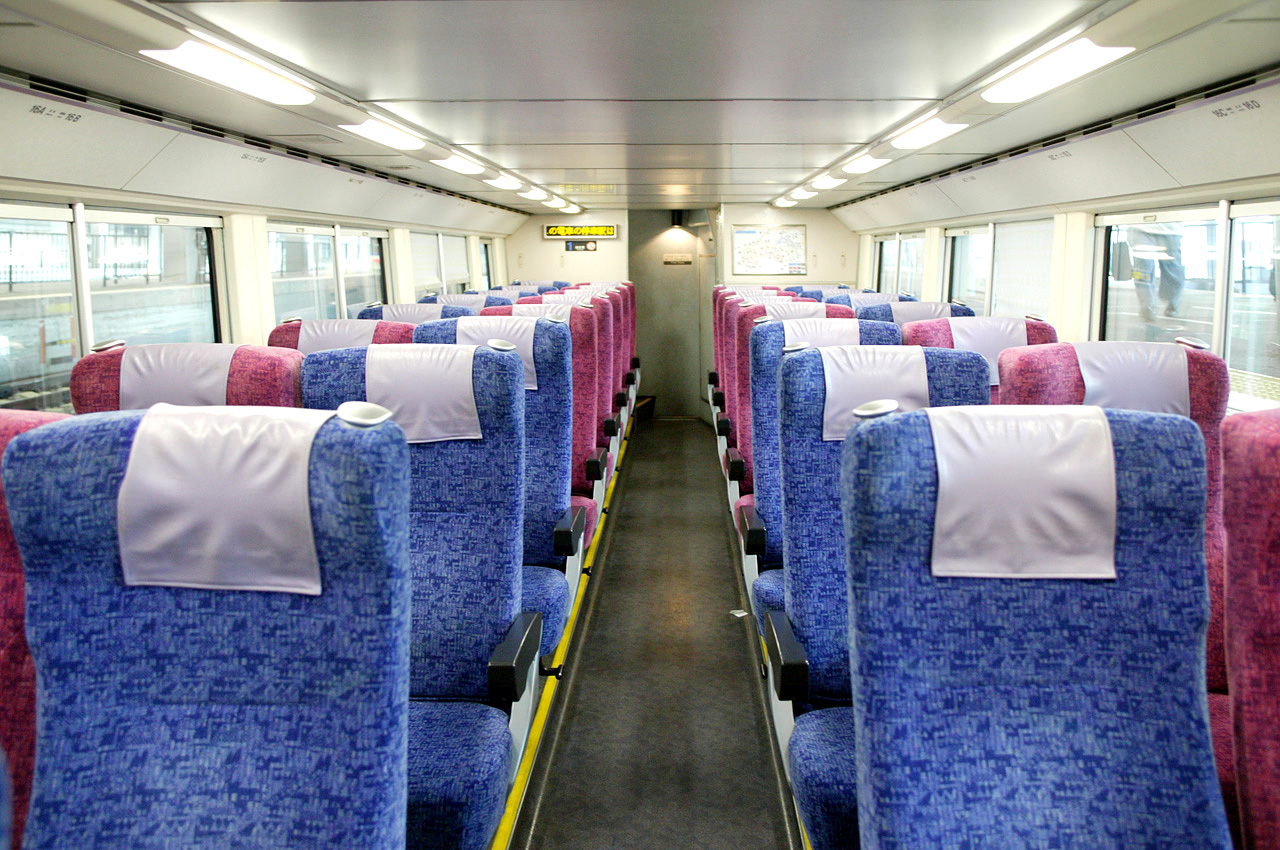
Interior view of 5100 series bilevel car lower deck

== History ==
The 5000 series sets were all delivered during August 2003, and entered revenue service from the start of the revised timetable on 1 October 2003.
