= Shikoku Aquarium =

- 四国水族館
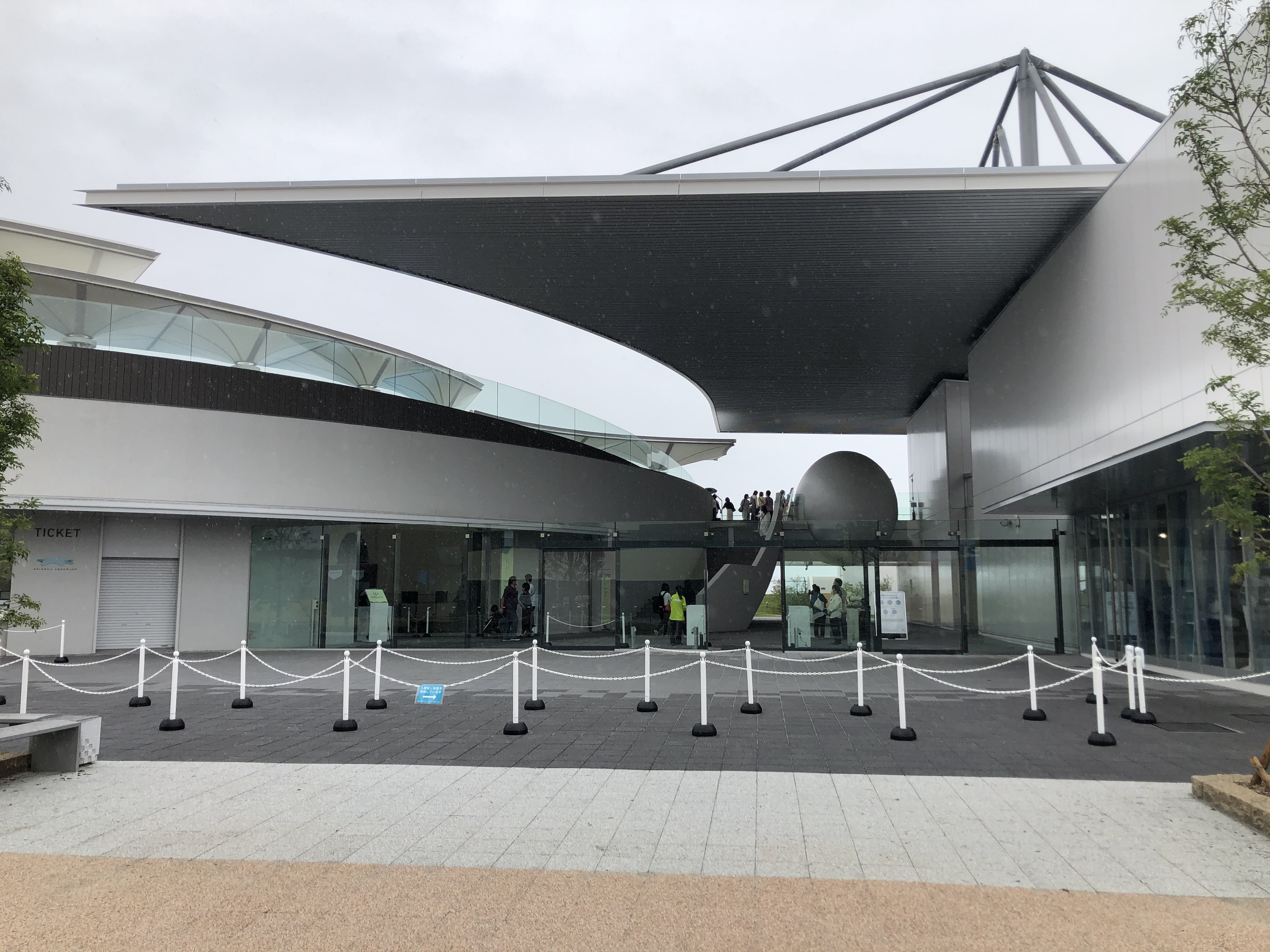
- Exterior of Shikoku Aquarium
- Interactive map of Shikoku Aquarium
- 34.312778°N 133.808056°E
- Date opened: 2020
- Location: Utazu, Kagawa, Japan
- Land area: 7,276 m^{2} (78,320 sq ft)
- No. of animals: 14,000
- No. of species: 400
- Website: https://shikoku-aquarium.jp

Shikoku Aquarium (四国水族館, Shikoku Suizokukan) is a Japanese public aquarium located in Utazu, Kagawa Prefecture. The aquarium is accredited as a Museum-equivalent facilities by the Museum Act from Ministry of Education, Culture, Sports, Science and Technology.

== History ==
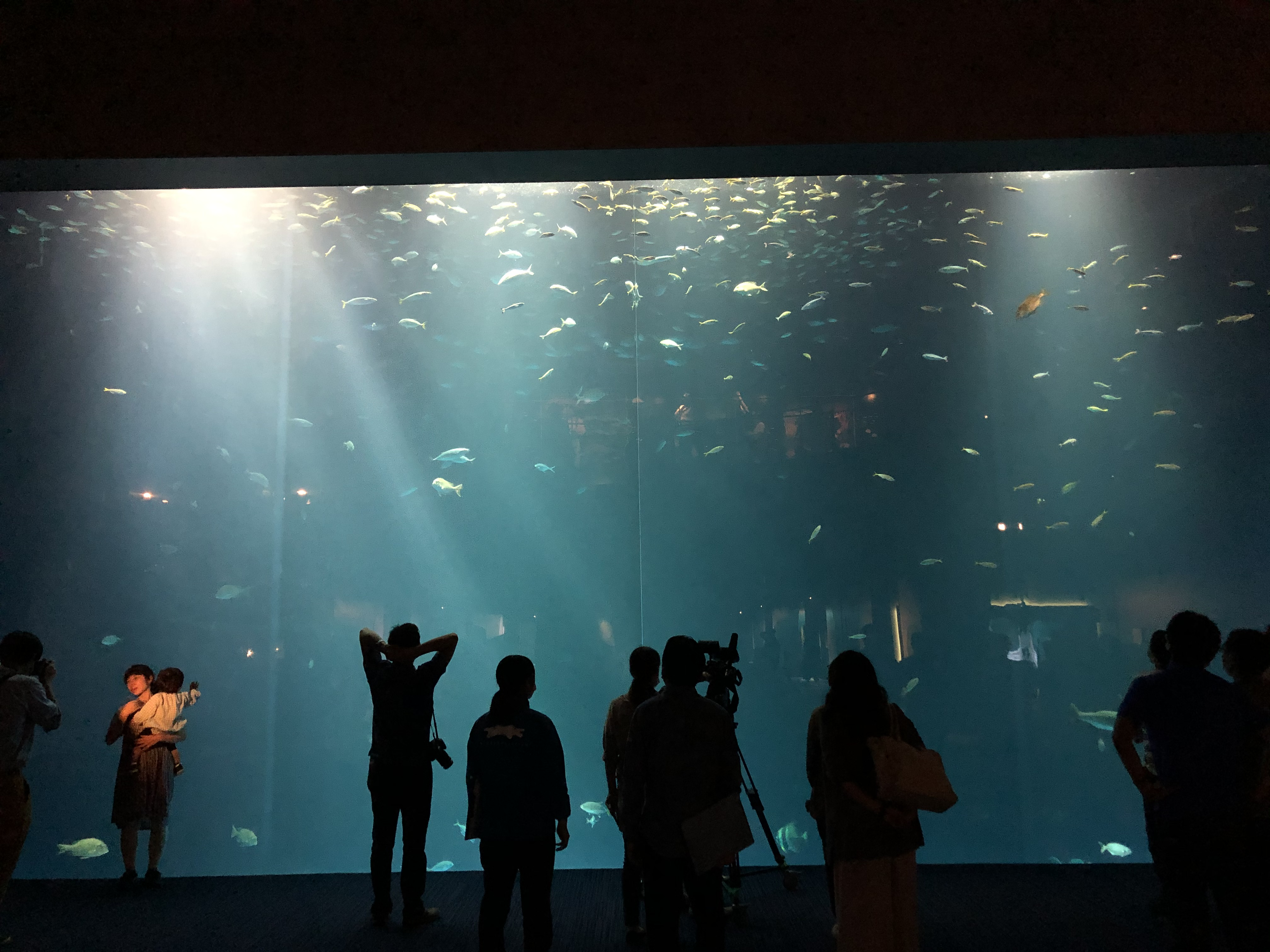
View of Watatsumi tank

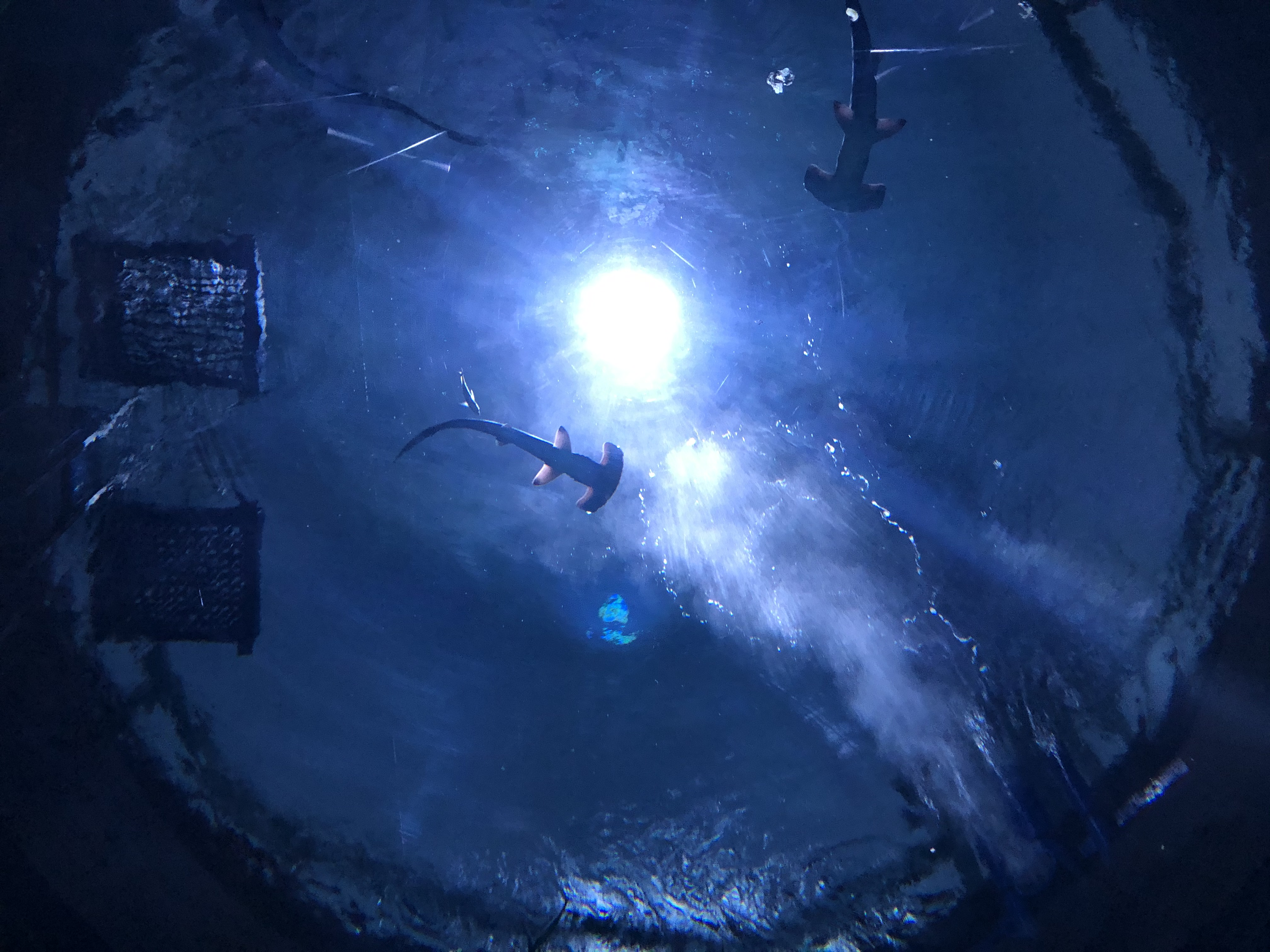
View of Kannazuki tank

Construction began in June 2018. The aquarium will be constructed by Shikoku Aquarium Kaihatsu, a joint venture of several companies, including those in Kagawa Prefecture, and will be operated by Aquament Corporation, a wholly owned subsidiary of Okayama City-based Wesco Holdings, which operates the Kobe City Suma Aqualife Park and other aquariums. Shikoku Aquarium Development has a partnership agreement with Kagawa University for joint research, human resource development, and regional contributions. The total project cost was approximately 7 billion yen, and the goal was to attract 1.2 million visitors in the first year.

Originally scheduled to open on March 20, 2020, it was announced on March 13 that the schedule would be postponed due to the spread of the COVID-19.

On March 27, it was announced that the grand opening would take place on April 13 after a preliminary opening on April 1 for residents of the four prefectures in Shikoku. A thermal imaging camera to measure the body temperature of visitors will be installed at the entrance, and the dolphin show and feeding experience will be suspended. As announced, the museum opened its doors to Shikoku residents on April 1.

On April 3, it was announced that the museum would be closed on Saturdays and Sundays for the time being for Shikoku residents, and that the grand opening would be postponed. On April 7, it was announced that the center would be closed for the time being from April 8 onward.

On May 29, it was announced that operations would resume on June 1. The museum will not be classifying visitors according to their place of residence, but will limit the number of visitors to 600 (500 on rainy days), and will ask visitors to wear masks and disinfect their hands and feet when entering the museum to prevent infection. Some events will continue to be suspended.

On September 18, 2020, five and a half months after its opening (115th day), the total number of visitors reached 300,000.

On October 18, 2021, approximately one and a half years after its opening, the museum reached a cumulative total of 1 million visitors. The director stated, "If not for the new coronavirus, I would have hoped to have reached this milestone around this time last year.

== Gallery ==
Interior

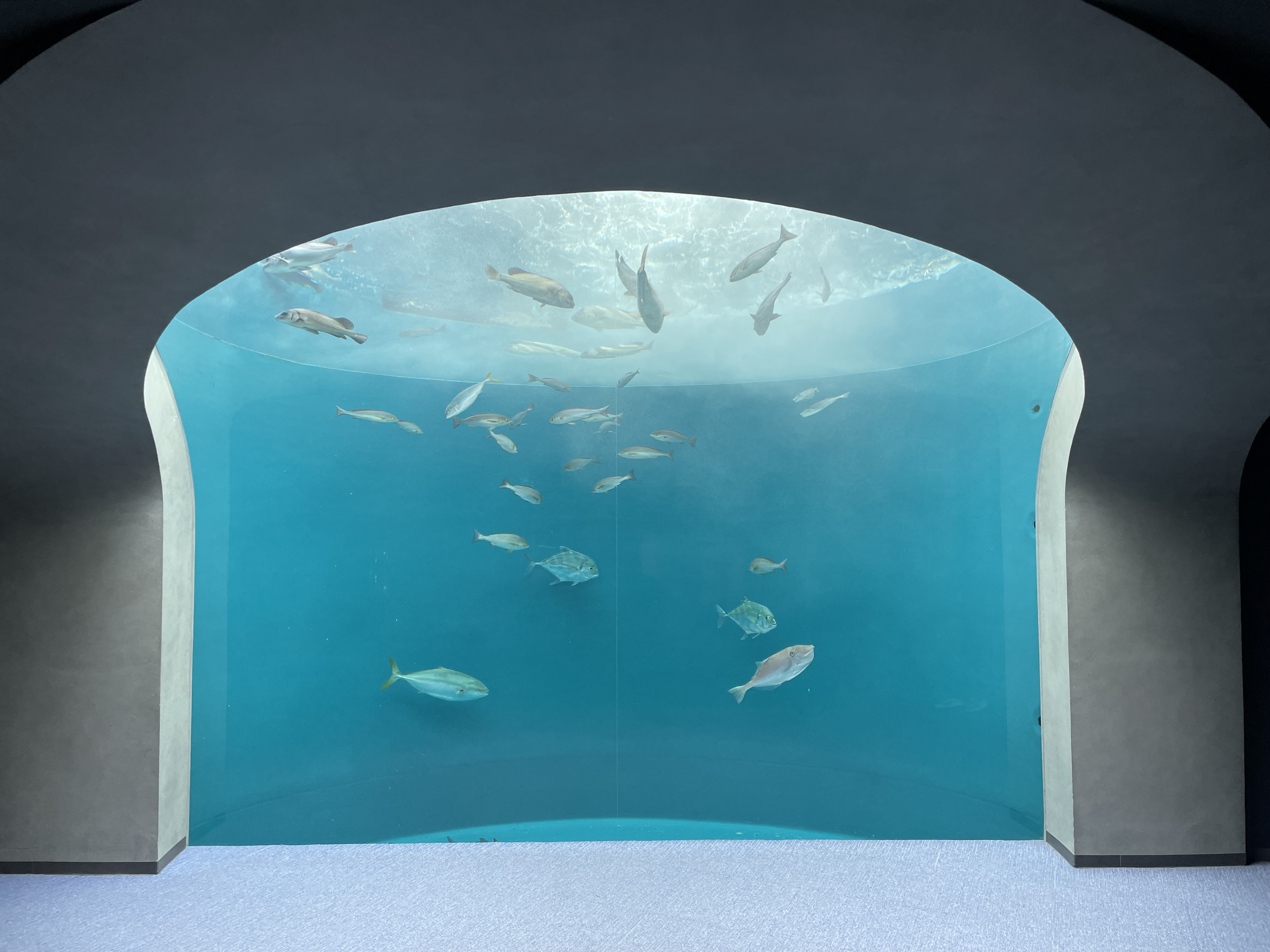

Exterior

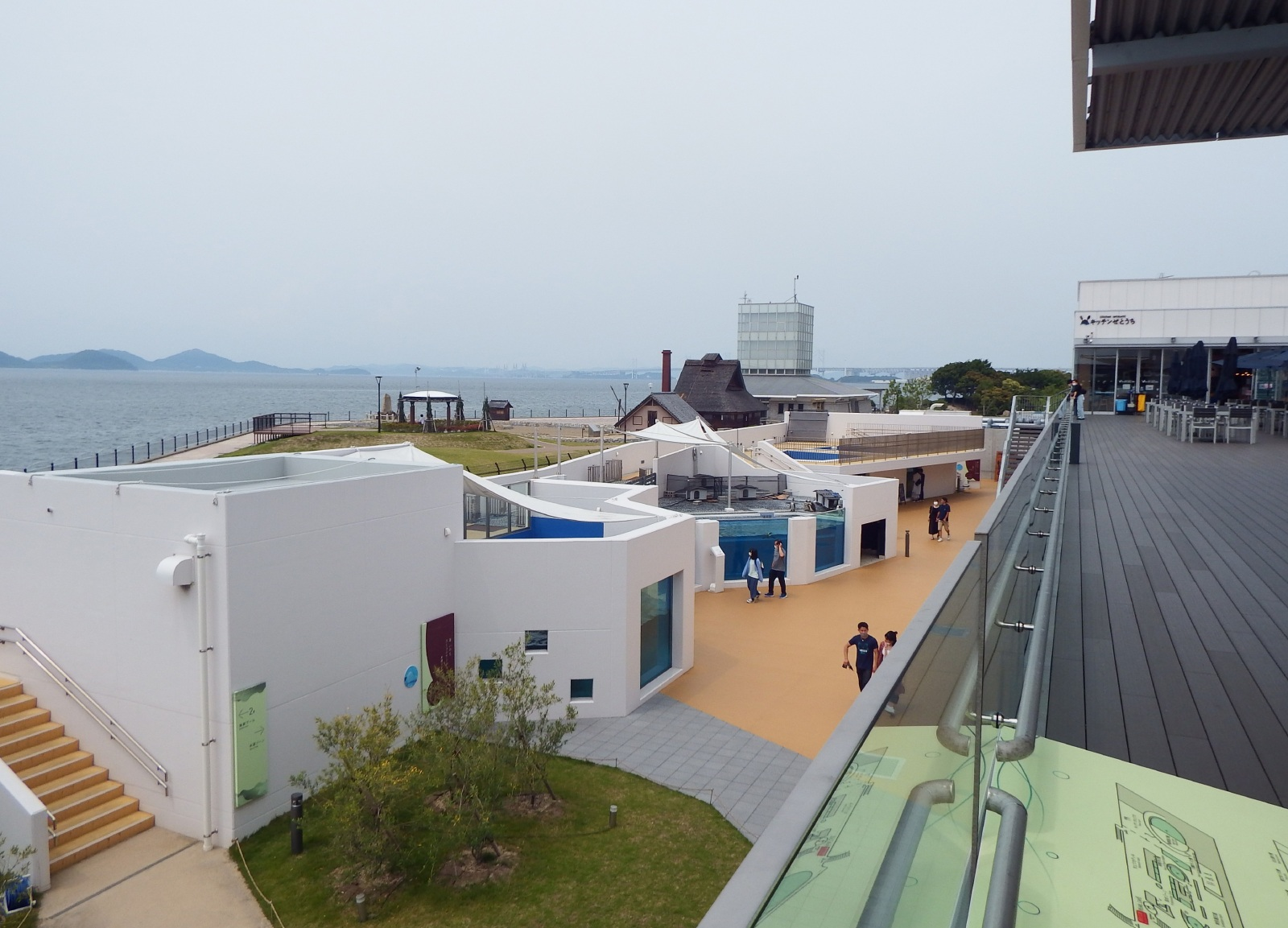

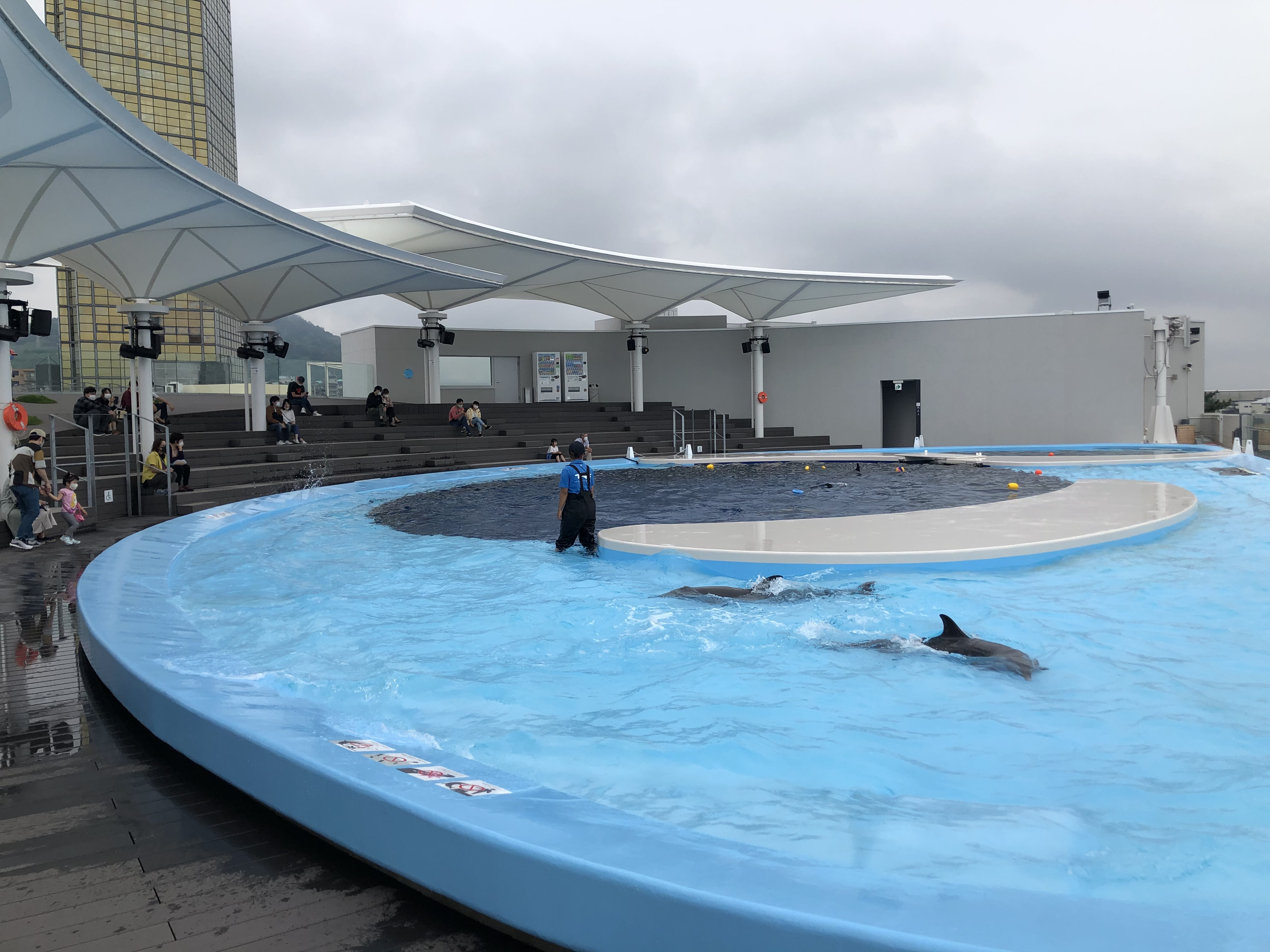

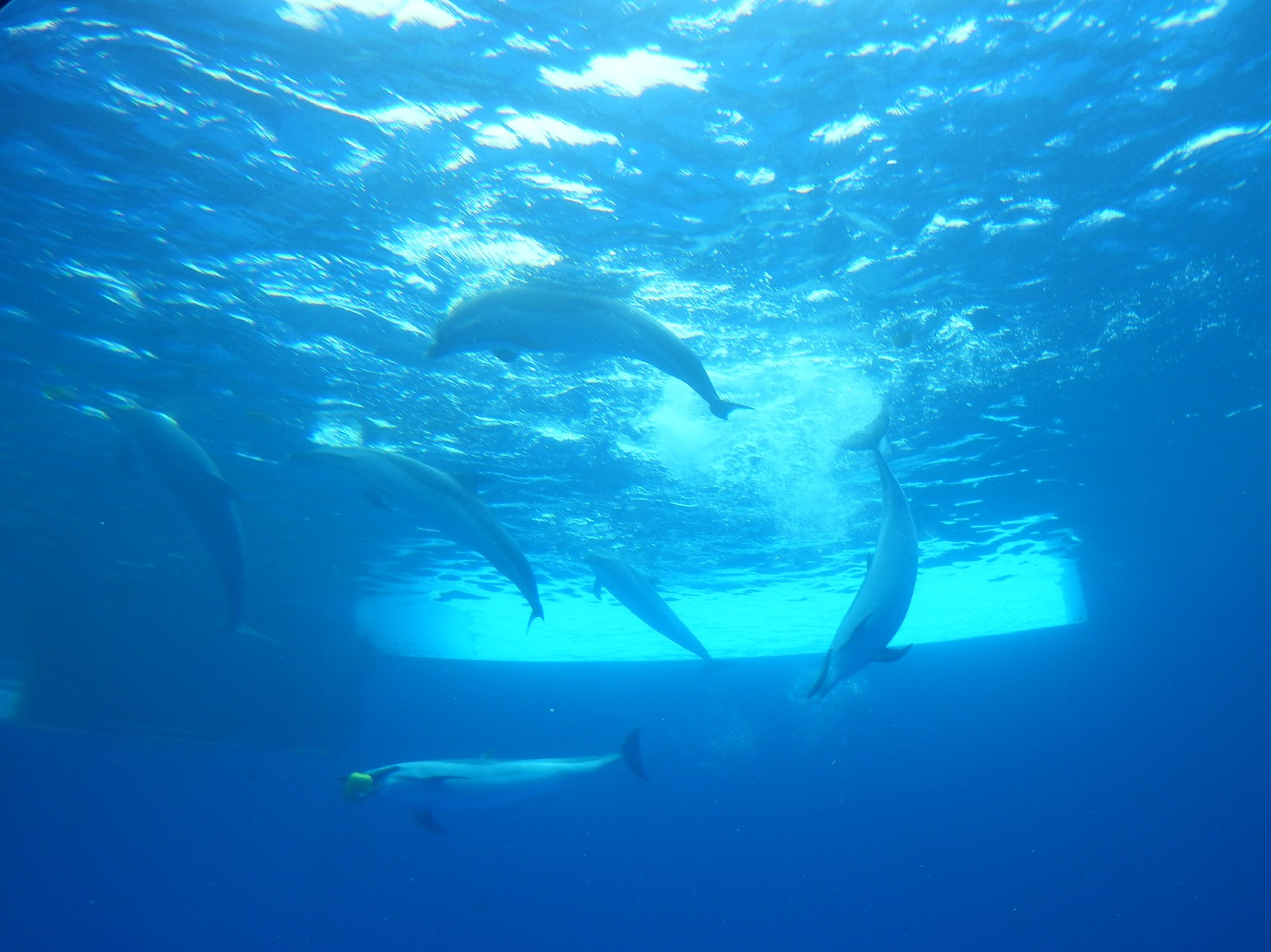

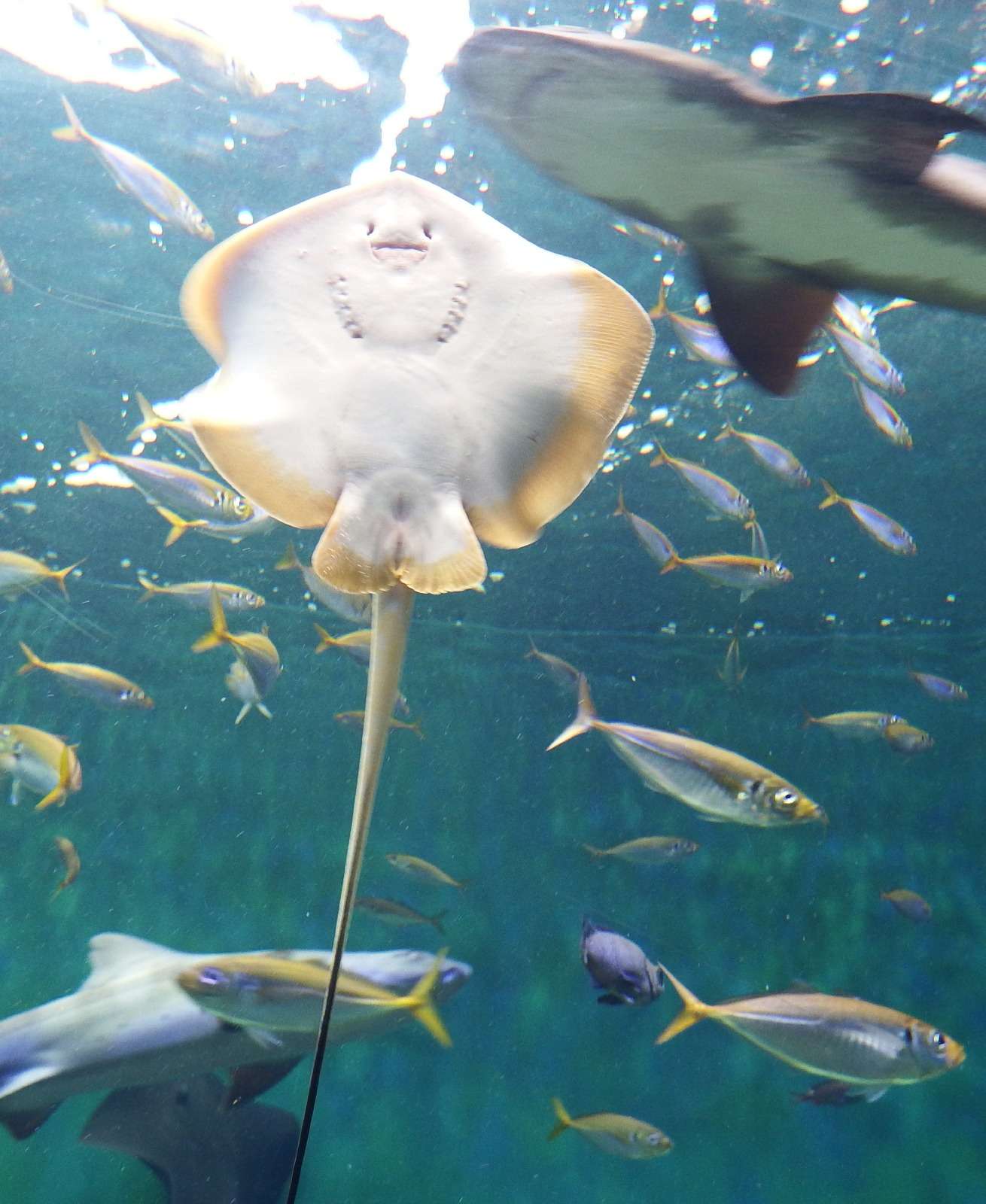

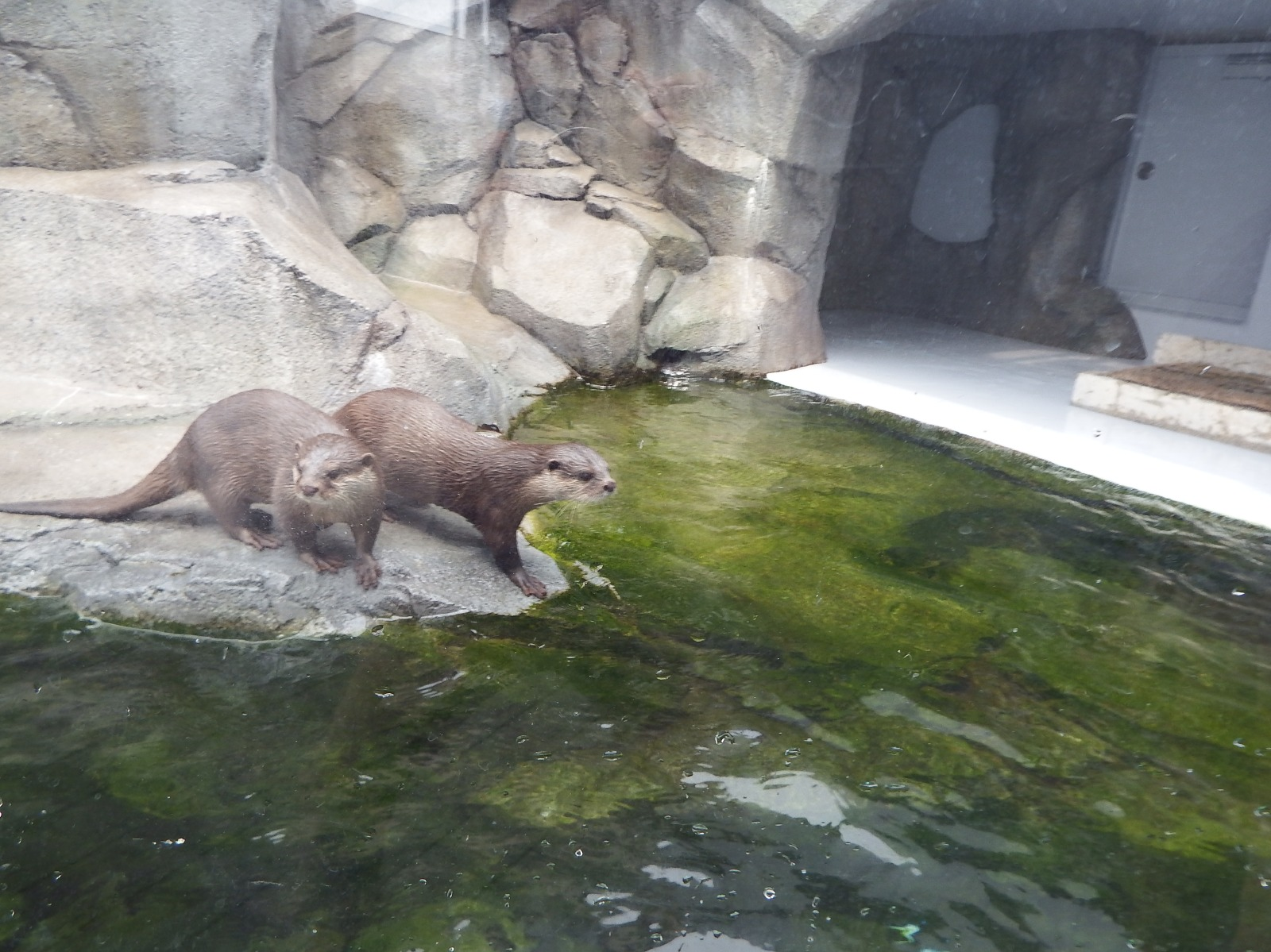

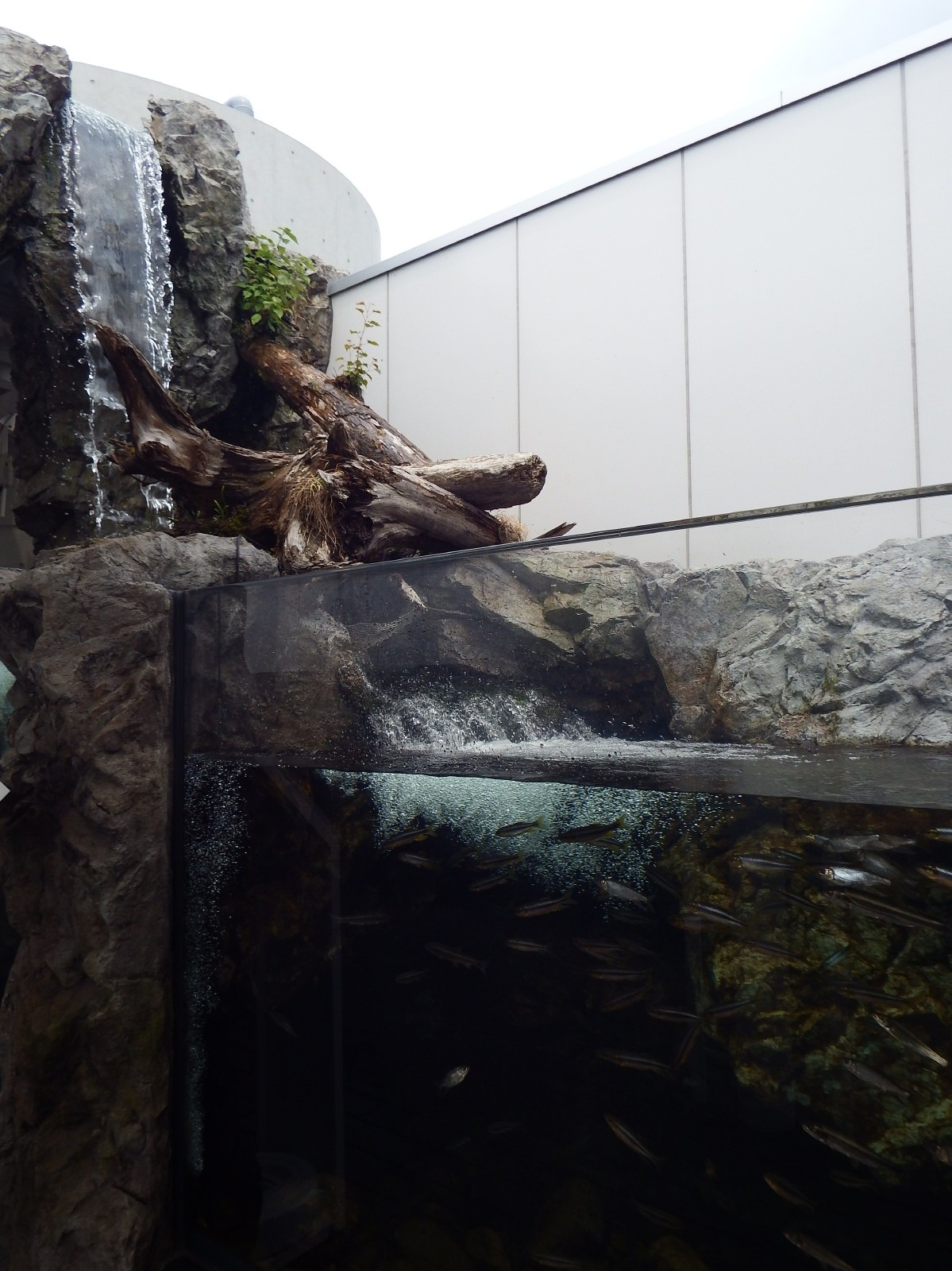

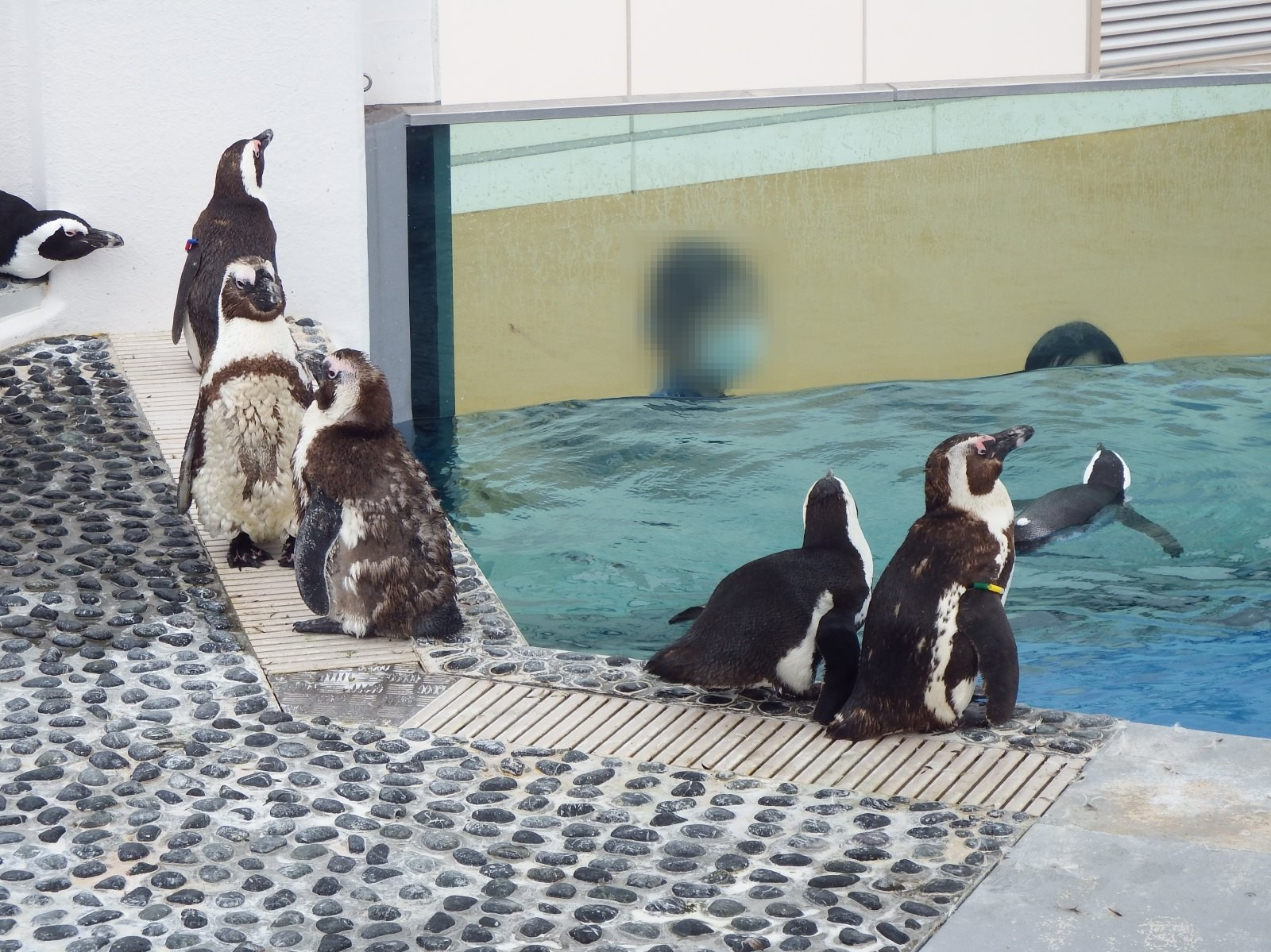

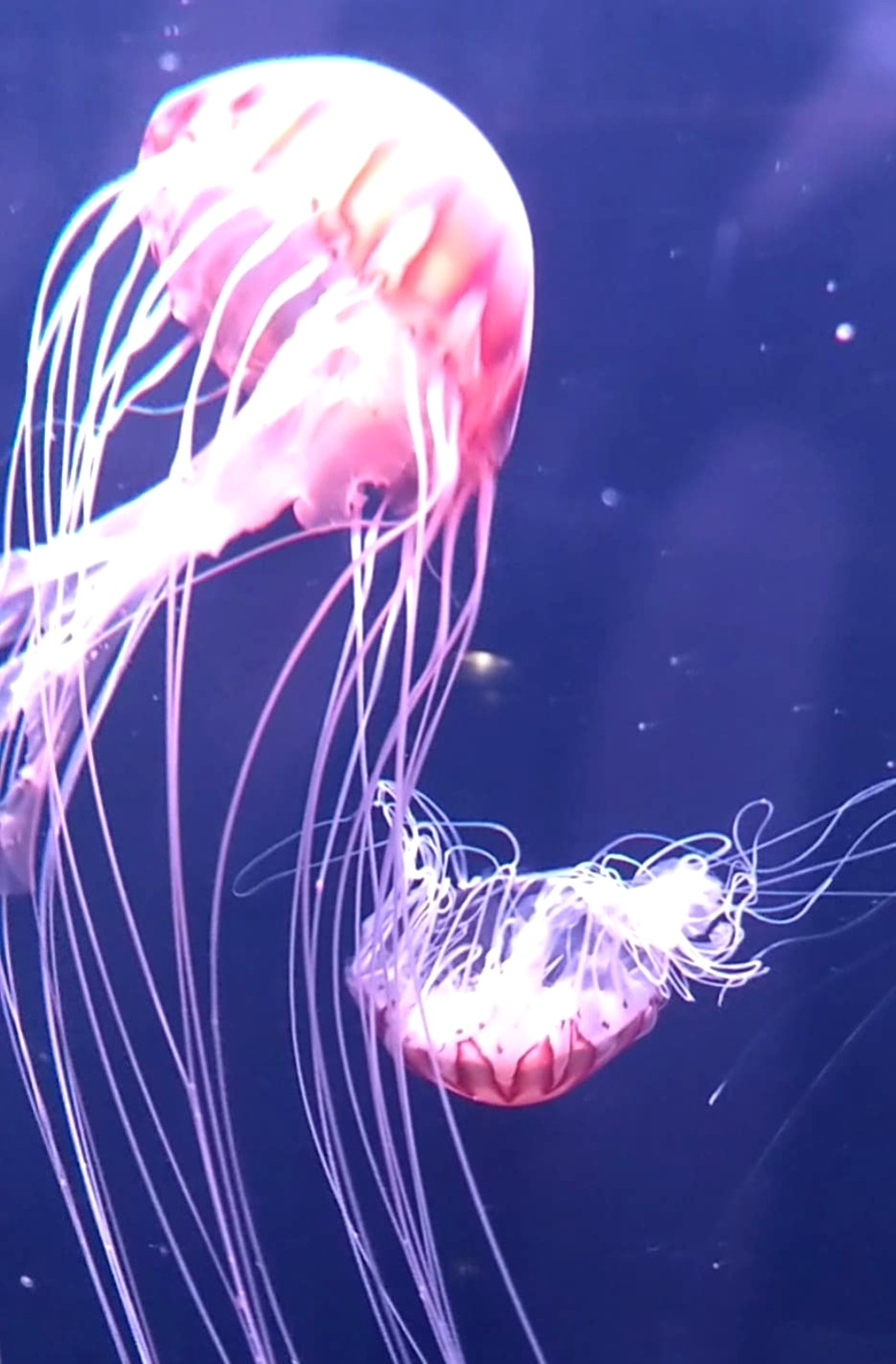
