= Kimi Station =

Railway station in Kurashiki, Okayama Prefecture, Japan

M 10 Kimi Station 木見駅
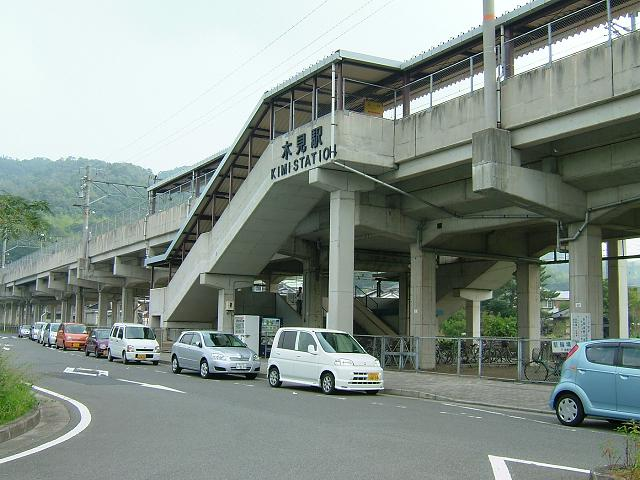
- The station building

General information
- Location: 469 Kimi, Kurashiki City, Okayama Prefecture; Japan
- Coordinates: 34°31′39.6″N 133°49′25.17″E
- System: JR West railway station
- Operator: JR West
- Line: Honshi-Bisan Line
- Distance: 5.6 km (3.5 mi) from Chayamachi
- Platforms: 2 side platforms
- Tracks: 2

Construction
- Structure type: Elevated

Other information
- Station code: JR-M10
- Website: Official website

History
- Opened: 20 March 1988; 38 years ago

Passengers
- 2019: 189

Services
Preceding station	JR West	Following station
Kaminochō M 11 towards Chayamachi	Seto-Ōhashi Line Rapid Marine Liner; Local	Uematsu M 09 towards Okayama
Kaminochō towards Utazu	Honshi-Bisan Line	Uematsu M 09 towards Chayamachi
Location
- Location within Okayama Prefecture Location within Japan

Kimi Station (木見駅, Kimi-eki) is a train station in Kurashiki, Okayama Prefecture, Japan.

== History ==
Kimi station opened on 20 March 1988.

== Lines ==
- West Japan Railway Company
  - Honshi-Bisan Line
