= Uematsu Station =

Railway station in Okayama, Japan

Uematsu Station 植松駅
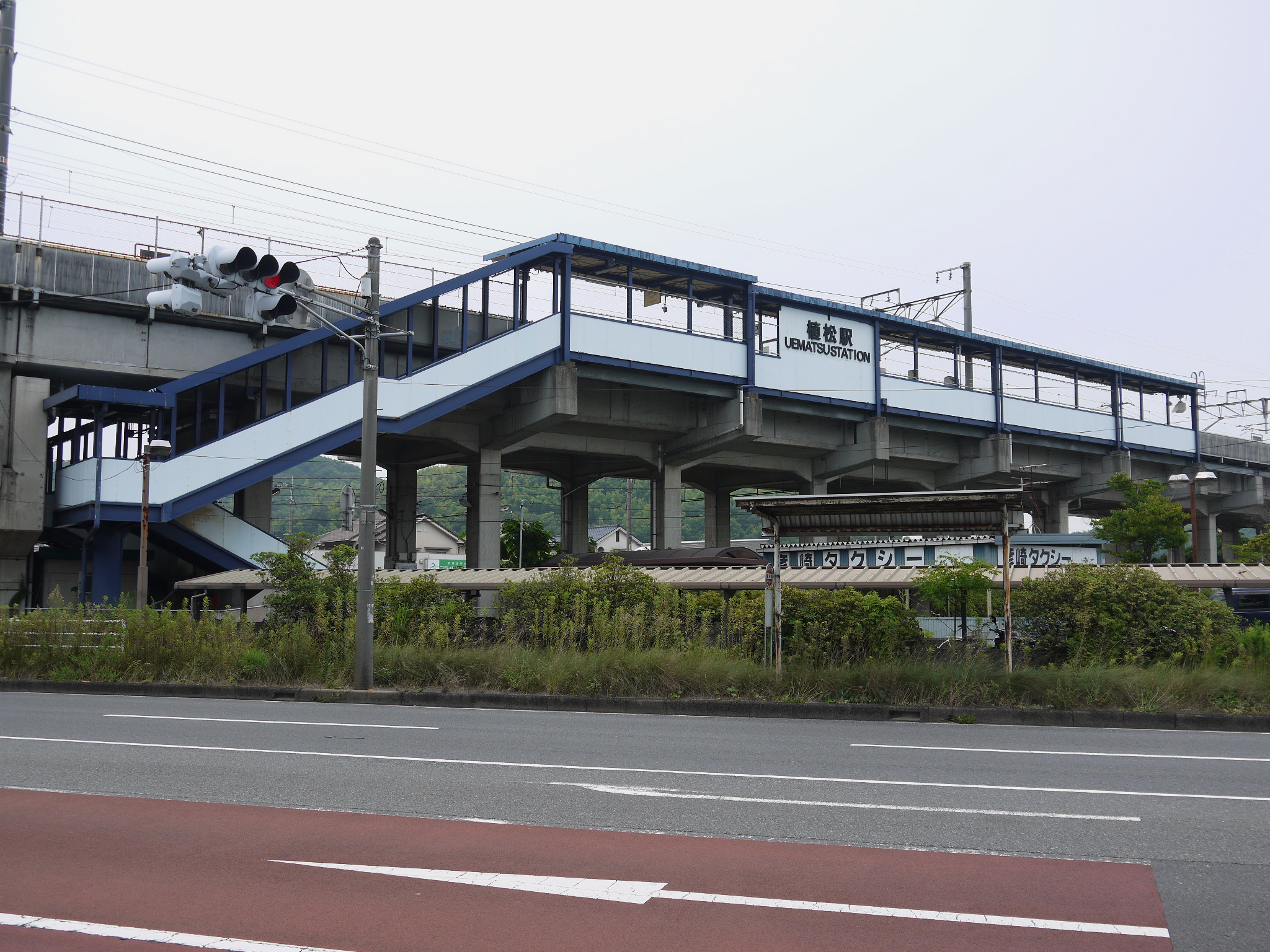
- Uematsu Station, July 2017

General information
- Location: 565 Uematsu, Minami-ku, Okayama-shi, Okayama-ken 710-0151; Japan
- Coordinates: 34°33′4.75″N 133°49′40.89″E
- Owner: West Japan Railway Company
- Operator: West Japan Railway Company
- Line: M Honshi-Bisan Line
- Distance: 2.9 km (1.8 miles) from Chayamachi
- Platforms: 2 side platforms
- Tracks: 2
- Connections: Bus stop

Construction
- Accessible: None

Other information
- Status: Unstaffed
- Station code: JR-M09
- Website: Official website

History
- Opened: March 20, 1988

Passengers
- FY2019: 185 daily

Services
Preceding station	JR West	Following station
Kimi towards Utazu	Honshi-Bisan Line	Chayamachi Terminus
Location
- Location within Okayama Prefecture Location within Japan

Uematsu Station (植松駅, Uematsu-eki) is a passenger railway station located in Minami-ku of the city of Okayama, Okayama Prefecture, Japan. It is operated by the West Japan Railway Company (JR West).

== Lines ==
Uematsu Station is served by the JR Honshi-Bisan Line, and is located 2.9 kilometers from the terminus of the line at Chayamachi and 17.89 kilometers from Okayama.

== Station layout ==
The station consists of two opposed elevated side platforms with the station facilities underneath. The station is unattended.

=== Platforms ===
1	■ M Honshi-Bisan Line	for Chayamachi and Okayama
2	■ M Honshi-Bisan Line	for Kojima and Takamatsu

== Adjacent stations ==
«	Service	»
JR West
Honshi-Bishan Line
Limited Express Uzushio: Does not stop at this station
Chayamachi	Rapid Marine Liner	Kimi

== History ==
Uematsu Station opened on 20 March 1988.

== Passenger statistics ==
In fiscal 2019, the station was used by an average of 185 passengers daily.

== Surrounding area ==
- Okayama Prefectural Road No. 21 Okayama Kojima Line
- Okayama Prefectural Road No. 22 Kurashiki Tamano Line
- Tonogaichi Park

== See also ==
- List of railway stations in Japan
