= Kaminochō Station =

Railway station in Kurashiki, Okayama Prefecture, Japan

Kaminochō Station 上の町駅
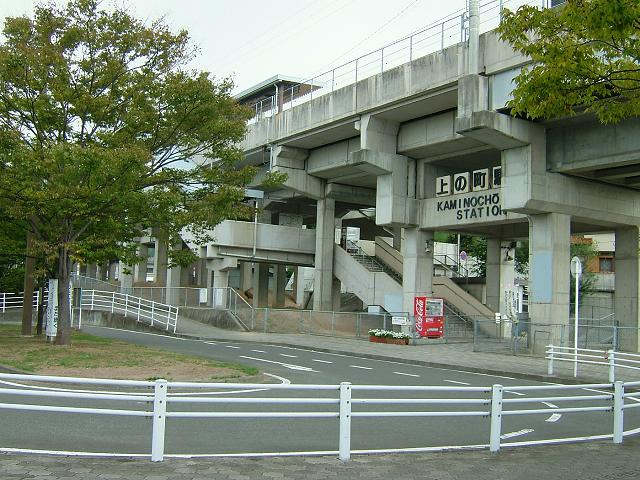
- The station building

General information
- Location: 2-60-2 Kojimakaminocho, Kurashiki City, Okayama Prefecture; Japan
- Coordinates: 34°29′26.35″N 133°48′54.54″E
- System: JR West railway station
- Operator: JR West
- Line: Honshi-Bisan Line
- Distance: 9.4 km (5.8 mi) from Chayamachi
- Platforms: 2 side platforms
- Tracks: 2

Construction
- Structure type: Elevated

Other information
- Station code: JR-M11

History
- Opened: 20 March 1988; 38 years ago

Services
Preceding station	JR West	Following station
Kojima towards Utazu	Honshi-Bisan Line	Kimi towards Chayamachi
Location
- Location within Okayama Prefecture Location within Japan

Kaminochō Station (上の町駅, Kaminochō-eki) is a train station in Kurashiki, Okayama Prefecture, Japan.

== Lines ==
- West Japan Railway Company
  - Honshi-Bisan Line

== History ==
Kaminocho station opened on 20 March 1988.

== Adjacent stations ==
«	Service	»
JR West
Honshi-Bishan Line
Limited Express Uzushio: Does not stop at this station
Kimi	Rapid Marine Liner	Kojima
