= Trinickia caryophylli =

Scientific classification
- Domain: Bacteria
- Kingdom: Pseudomonadati
- Phylum: Pseudomonadota
- Class: Betaproteobacteria
- Order: Burkholderiales
- Family: Burkholderiaceae
- Genus: Trinickia
- Species: T. caryophylli

Binomial name
- Trinickia caryophylli Estrada-de Los Santos et al., 2018

Synonyms
- Burkholderia caryophylli; Paraburkholderia caryophylli; Pseudomonas caryophylli; Phytomonas caryophylli

Species of bacteria

Trinickia caryophylli is a gram-negative, motile, parasitic bacteria. It is a plant pathogen and causes bacterial wilt of carnation in Dianthus species.

T. caryophylli possesses the enzyme D-threo-aldolase dehydrogenase which enables it to use L-glucose as a source of energy. This metabolic quality is very rare with Paracoccus laeviglucosivorans being the only other characterized species able to metabolize L-glucose.

== Taxonomy ==
Bacterial wilt of carnation was first described in 1941 by L. K. Jones. The bacterium responsible for the disease was then named and described in detail by W. H. Burkholder in 1942. The initial name was Phytomonas caryophylli which was then changed to Pseudomonas caryophylli four months later. In 1992 it was then moved to the novel Burkholderia genus. In 2014 the Burkholderia genus was divided into the genus Burkholderia, containing pathogenic species, and Paraburkholderia, containing non-pathogenic species. This made the new name of the bacteria Paraburkholderia caryophylli. In 2018 the species was moved to the novel Trinickia genus. The currently accepted name of this species is Trinickia caryophylli.

== Characteristics ==
Trinickia caryophylli is gram-negative, rod shaped with rounded ends, often slightly curved and possesses one or multiple flagella that may be polar or bipolar. It is capable of using L-glucose, the enantiomer of the naturally occurring D-glucose, as a source of energy. The vast majority of organisms, including all multicellular life, are incapable of metabolizing L-glucose. As of April 2025 T. caryophylli along with Paracoccus laeviglucosivorans remain the only two characterized organisms capable of using L-glucose. While some additional microorganisms have been found to be able to metabolize L-glucose, none of them have been taxonomically characterized and research on L-glucose utilization remains scant.

== Bacterial wilt of carnation ==
T. caryophylli causes the disease bacterial wilt of carnation in Dianthus species. Symptoms include leaves and stems turning grayish-green and then yellow and cracking at the stem. The bacterium enters its host through wounds, subsequently colonizing the vascular system. This usually happens when cuttings from diseased plants are placed adjacent to other, healthy cuttings. The bacteria will move from the diseased cutting to the water in the propagation bed and then to the healthy cuttings. Infection with T. caryophylli used to be a major problem for carnation production in the United States and also affected the European and Mediterranean region, although to a lesser extent. However, due to several measures taken against the pathogen, carnation crops are only rarely infected today.
