= D-threo-aldose 1-dehydrogenase =

d-threo-aldose 1-dehydrogenase

Identifiers
- EC no.: 1.1.1.122
- CAS no.: 9082-70-6

Databases
- IntEnz: IntEnz view
- BRENDA: BRENDA entry
- ExPASy: NiceZyme view
- KEGG: KEGG entry
- MetaCyc: metabolic pathway
- PRIAM: profile
- PDB structures: RCSB PDB PDBe PDBsum
- Gene Ontology: AmiGO / QuickGO
Search
- PMC: articles
- PubMed: articles
- NCBI: proteins

In enzymology, d-threo-aldose 1-dehydrogenase is an enzyme that catalyzes the chemical reaction

d-threo-aldose + NAD^{+} $\rightleftharpoons$ d-threo-aldono-1,5-lactone + NADH + H^{+}

Thus, the two substrates of this enzyme are d-threo-aldose and NAD^{+}, whereas its 3 products are d-threo-aldono-1,5-lactone, NADH, and H^{+}.

This enzyme belongs to the family of oxidoreductases, specifically those acting on the CH-OH group of donor with NAD^{+} or NADP^{+} as acceptor. The systematic name of this enzyme class is d-threo-aldose:NAD^{+} 1-oxidoreductase. Other names in common use include l-fucose dehydrogenase, (2S,3R)-aldose dehydrogenase, dehydrogenase, l-fucose, and l-fucose (d-arabinose) dehydrogenase. This enzyme participates in ascorbate and aldarate metabolism.

d-threo-aldose 1-dehydrogenase is capable of oxidizing l-glucose, l-xylose, d-arabinose, and l-fucose, allowing Trinickia caryophylli, the organism from which it was first isolated, to use l-Glucose as a source of energy. Oxidation of these monosaccharides is inhibited by their respective enantiomers.
