= Allose kinase =

Identifiers
- EC no.: 2.7.1.55
- CAS no.: 9031-78-1

Databases
- IntEnz: IntEnz view
- BRENDA: BRENDA entry
- ExPASy: NiceZyme view
- KEGG: KEGG entry
- MetaCyc: metabolic pathway
- PRIAM: profile
- PDB structures: RCSB PDB PDBe PDBsum
- Gene Ontology: AmiGO / QuickGO
Search
- PMC: articles
- PubMed: articles
- NCBI: proteins

Allose kinase (EC 2.7.1.55) is an enzyme that catalyzes the chemical reaction

ATP +
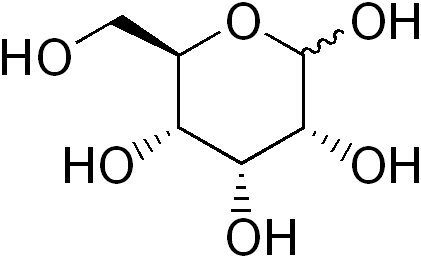
D-allose
ADP +
α-D-allopyranose 6-phosphate

The enzyme characterised from Aerobacter aerogenes converts the aldohexose sugar, D-allose (shown in its pyranose form), to α-D-allopyranose 6-phosphate by transferring a phosphate group from the cofactor, adenosine triphosphate (ATP), which is converted to adenosine diphosphate (ADP).

This enzyme is a transferase, specifically one transferring phosphorus-containing groups (phosphotransferases) with an alcohol group as acceptor. The systematic name of this enzyme class is ATP:D-allose 6-phosphotransferase. Other names in common use include allokinase (phosphorylating), allokinase, D-allokinase, and D-allose-6-kinase.
