= Bacterial wilt of carnation =

Bacterial plant disease

Bacterial wilt of carnations
- Common names: Bacterial wilt of carnations and bacterial stem crack of carnations
- Causal agents: Trinickia caryophylli
- Hosts: Carnations (Dianthus caryophyllus)
- EPPO Code: PSDMCA

Bacterial wilt of carnations (also known as carnation bacterial wilt) is a bacterial disease caused by the plant pathogen Trinickia caryophylli. The pathogen is an aerobic gram negative bacteria known for only being capable of entering its host through wounds. Once inside the host, it colonizes the vascular system and roots causing symptoms such as, internal stem cracking, yellowing of the leaves, wilting, and the development of cankers. As a bacterial disease, bacterial wilt of carnations can also be characterized by signs such as bacterial streaming, and bacterial ooze.

== Hosts and symptoms ==
T. caryophylli infects many different species of the Dianthus plant genus. The species Dianthus barbatus (sweet William) and Dianthus alwoodii (allwoodii hybrids) can be infected through induced artificial inoculation in a lab setting, however, the pathogen only naturally infects the species D. caryophyllus (carnation). If infected, the pathogen induces symptoms on the host such as the discoloration of leaves and stems; they become grayish-green with subsequent yellowing. This initial leaf and stem discoloration is usually followed by plant wilting and death. Stem bases may also show internodal stem cracking, developing into small areas of dead tissue, which grow slowly over years (cankers). Cutting diseased stems often reveals brownish-yellow bacterial ooze. The wilting of the plant signifies the presence of rotten roots. This causes a significant decrease in the plants ability to anchor itself into the soil. Symptoms can take up to 2–3 years to surface. Visual symptoms are most readily seen in mature plants by inspection of aerial parts. Although there may be an extended period of latency, once plants begin showing symptoms, death typically occurs within 1–2 months. The contraction of bacterial wilt of carnation is often followed by secondary fungal invasions and disease.

=== Diagnosis ===
To make a reliable diagnosis, multiple samples of stems should be examined (young and old) and isolation should be made from the diseased tissues. Microscopic observation of stem sections may show new growth around infected vessels, plugging of vessels, hardening of their walls, and necrosis. Since latent infections on cuttings cannot be readily detected, cuttings should be kept at a relatively high temperature to ensure maximum symptom expression. The bacterium can be detected by immunofluorescence staining (IFAS) and direct isolation on 96 microwell cell culture plate even in material with latent infection. T. caryophylli has also been detected from inoculated carnation by PCR and LAMP (Loop-mediated isothermal amplification).

== Disease cycle ==
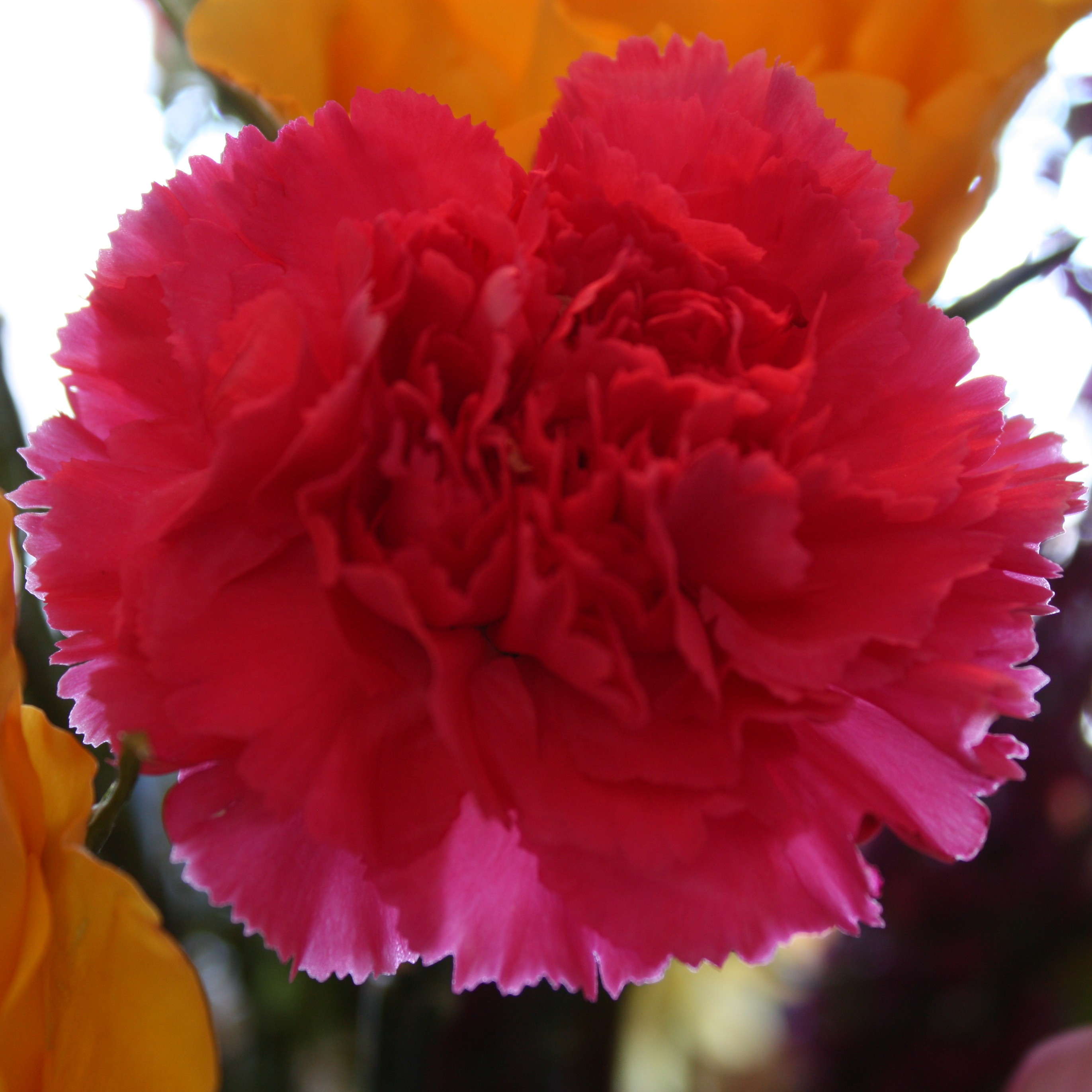
Healthy carnation

T. caryophylli is a soil borne bacterium that overwinters in the rhizosphere of soil forming close interactions with the host plant and soil itself. Additionally, it can also survive in infected host debris. T. caryophylli infects susceptible plants through wounds which are present at the base and the crown of the host. The successful dissemination of the bacterial infection can occur Pre and post-planting. Pre-planting dissemination occurs when the stems of Carnation flowers from the infected host are cut and placed in a water bed with healthy plants, before they are individually planted (the bacteria slowly spreads from one cutting to the next via free water). Because of the possibility of transmission during the latent period, cuttings require cautious cultural measures. Post-planting dissemination may occur from one root system to the next via an existing canker in the infected plant. When the canker, which contains accumulated yellowish-brown bacterial slime, oozes out via an opening, the bacteria is released to the surrounding soil. T. caryophylli cannot travel long distances, and therefore, only infects neighboring plant roots systems. As the root system absorbs the nutrient and water from the soil, it also absorbs the soil-borne bacteria in the soil. Once inside the host, the bacterium aggregates towards the vascular system, finding its way to the phloem. It also blocks the xylem, cutting off the water circulation of the plant. Eventually, the roots are no longer able to anchor properly onto the soil. As the host plant wilts and dies, the bacteria overwinters in the host debris and soil.

== Environment ==
The pathogen can infect at a wide range of temperatures, however, certain symptoms are temperature specific. Wilting symptoms are found more frequently in plants grown at high temperatures (>30 °C), whereas no symptoms or solely stem-cracking symptoms are more common at lower temperatures (< 20 °C). When soil temperatures are below 17 °C, a rapid multiplication of cells causes tension around the xylem and phloem. Inter-nodal stem cracks at the base of the plant also appear which later develop into deep cankers. Protected environments (green house, small gardens, etc.) in which there are controlled growing conditions are deemed a more suitable growing environment for the pathogen, as opposed to unprotected environments such as open fields. Turf and sphagnum peat have been reported to be a suitable environment for T. caryophylli, and the use of these natural substrates may enhance spread, establishment, and survival of the pathogen. Current cultural practices and general control measures are very effective in keeping the crop free from the bacterium in protected environments.

== Management of the disease ==
T. caryophylli cannot be directly controlled by a chemical means, simply because no chemical products are available that can control the bacterial wilt of carnations. However, sanitary procedures can prevent further infestation. These procedures include but are not limited to picking up infected host debris and careful handling of tools. Checking for signs of infected plant before plant cutting and checking the soil for the presence of bacteria will ensure that further dissemination is significantly decreased, if not prevented. In checking for the presence of disease before further planting, induced high temperatures should be employed to accelerate bacterial growth and symptoms. At an early stage of disease, the “KPV-Metoden” testing method can be used to detect infections present in carnation cuttings. Although there are no commercial varieties of Dianthus caryophyllus that are resistant to the bacterial pathogen, T. caryophylli, there are some wild species that may have genes which display a resistance. Under a testing method that used cut-root soaking to inoculate different species of Dianthus plants with B. caryophylli, D. capitatus spp. Andrzejowskianus and D. henteri were two wild type species which did not show any symptoms usually caused by T. caryophylli. Five other wild type species along with D. capitatus spp. Andrzejowskianus and D. henteri were also labeled as resistant due to a very low percentage of wilted plants.

== Importance ==
Bacterial wilt of carnations causes devastating losses for areas in which carnations play an important economic role. Its impact areas include the former Yugoslavia, Italy, Serbia, Montenegro, China Taiwan, India, South America, (Brazil, Colombia, and Uruguay), and the United States. It is one of the leading diseases which infect carnations in Japan; it has caused serious crop losses of carnations which are grown in warm districts. It is because of the devastating effects in crop loss that breeding programs were initiated in 1988 by the National Institute of Floriculture Science (NIFS) Japan in search for resistance. Bacterial Wilt of Carnation is also defined as an A2 quarantine pest by the European and Mediterranean Plant Protection Organization (EPPO). It has received this quarantine ranking based on the limited number of EPPO countries it has been reported in. At current, the loss it causes the EPPO region is very minor. The bacterial organism and disease have also been listed as a quarantine pest for Iran.

=== Floriculture ===
Floriculture is the large-scale cultivation and farming of specific plants, such as flowering and ornamental plants, for various uses. These uses include gardening, floristry, and floral design. Columbia has been noted in history as being one of the top international exporters of cut flowers, and being first in the exportation of carnations. Diseases like bacterial wilt of carnation pose a serious threat to the Floriculture industry, and specifically to fresh cut flowers like carnations.
