= Trinickia =

Scientific classification
- Domain: Bacteria
- Kingdom: Pseudomonadati
- Phylum: Pseudomonadota
- Class: Betaproteobacteria
- Order: Burkholderiales
- Family: Burkholderiaceae
- Genus: Trinickia; Estrada-de Los Santos et al. 2018

Type species
- Paraburkholderia symbiotica (Sheu et al. 2012) Sawana et al. 2015

Species
- 12, see text

Genus of bacteria

Trinickia is a genus of gram-negative aerobic bacteria in the family Burkholderiaceae.

== Species ==
The genus Trinickia includes the following species:

- Trinickia acidisoli Wang et al. 2023
- Trinickia camelliae Wang et al. 2026
- Trinickia caryophylli (Burkholder 1942) Estrada-de Los Santos et al. 2018
- Trinickia dabaoshanensis Estrada-de los Santos et al. 2020
- Trinickia diaoshuihuensis Fu et al. 2019
- Trinickia dinghuensis Gao et al. 2019
- Trinickia fusca Gao et al. 2019
- Trinickia mobilis Wang et al. 2023
- Trinickia soli (Yoo et al. 2007) Estrada-de Los Santos et al. 2018
- Trinickia symbiotica (Sheu et al. 2012) Estrada-de Los Santos et al. 2018
- Trinickia terrae Gao et al. 2023
- Trinickia violacea Gao et al. 2023
