= Utazu =

Utazu 宇多津町
- Town
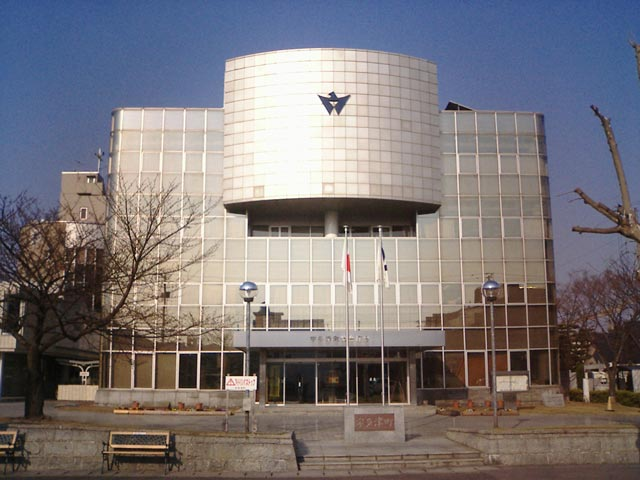
- Utazu town office

- Flag Emblem

- Location of Utazu in Kagawa Prefecture

- Location in Japan
- Coordinates: 34°19′N 133°50′E
- Country: Japan
- Region: Shikoku
- Prefecture: Kagawa
- District: Ayauta

Government
  - Mayor: Toshihiro Tanigawa (since October 2010)

Area
  - Total: 8.10 km^{2} (3.13 sq mi)

Population (December 1, 2023)
  - Total: 18,755
  - Density: 2,320/km^{2} (6,000/sq mi)
- Time zone: UTC+09:00 (JST)
- City hall address: 1881 Utatsu-chō, Ayauta-gun, Kagawa-ken 769-0292
- Website: Official website
- Symbols
- Flower: Rhododendron
- Tree: Cherry blossom

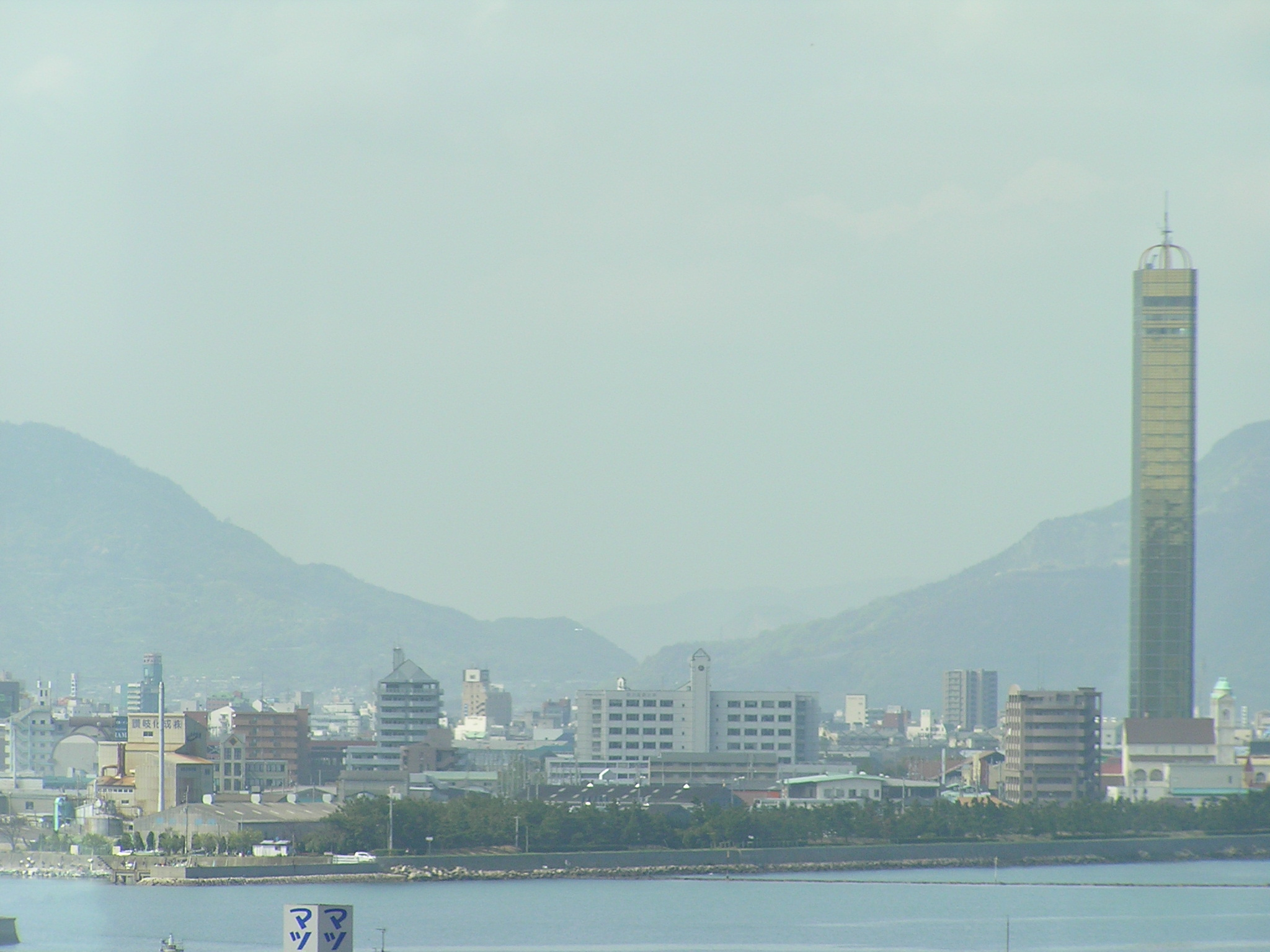
Utazu town seen from Seto-Ohashi Line

Utazu (宇多津町, Utazu-chō) is a town located in Ayauta District, Kagawa Prefecture, Japan. As of 1 December 2023, the town had an estimated population of 18,755 in 9131 households and a population density of 2300 persons per km^{2}. The total area of the town is 8.1 square kilometres (3.1 sq mi).

== Geography ==
Utazu is located in north-central of Kagawa Prefecture on the island of Shikoku, and is bordered by the Seto Inland Sea to the north, Sakaide City to the east and Marugame City to the west. Its area is the smallest among municipalities in the prefecture. Within the town, the Yoshida area (part of the Bannoshu Rinkai Industrial Park) is a reclaimed land, but because it is separated from the rest of the town by the Kitaura fishing port, it is an enclave which is accessible by land is via the adjacent Sakaide.

=== Neighbouring municipalities ===
Kagawa Prefecture

- Marugame
- Sakaide

=== Climate ===
Utazu has a humid subtropical climate (Köppen Cfa) characterized by warm summers and cool winters with light snowfall. The average annual temperature in Utazu is 15.7 °C. The average annual rainfall is 1439 mm with September as the wettest month. The temperatures are highest on average in January, at around 26.6 °C, and lowest in January, at around 5.3 °C.

== Demographics ==
Per Japanese census data, the population of Utazu has been increasing steadily since the 1960s.

Historical population
Year	Pop.	±%
1950	8,986	—
1960	8,503	−5.4%
1970	9,569	+12.5%
1980	11,341	+18.5%
1990	12,807	+12.9%
2000	15,978	+24.8%
2010	18,434	+15.4%
2020	18,699	+1.4%

== History ==
The area of Utazu was part of ancient Sanuki Province, and was the main port connecting Shikoku with the Kinai region in ancient times. From the Kamakura period, Utazu Castle was the stronghold of the Hosokawa clan, ruled as shugo of Shikoku. During the Edo Period, the area was part of the holdings of Takamatsu. Following the Meiji restoration, the village of Utazu was established with the creation of the modern municipalities system on February 15, 1890. it was raised to town status on February 11, 1898 .

== Government ==
Utazu has a mayor-council form of government with a directly elected mayor and a unicameral town council of 10 members. Utazu contributes one member to the Kagawa Prefectural Assembly. In terms of national politics, the town is part of Kagawa 2nd district of the lower house of the Diet of Japan.

== Economy ==
Utazu was traditionally known for its vast salt fields. From the 1980s, the salt fields were reclaimed and redevelopment began, with industrial parks constructed on reclaimed land in the coastal areas and middle-rise condominiums, being constructed around the relocated route of the Yosan Line train station.

== Education ==
Utazu has two public elementary schools and one public middle school operated by the town government. The town does not have a high school; however, it is the home of Shikoku Medical College.

== Transportation ==
=== Railways ===
Shikoku Railway Company - Yosan Line

- Utazu

Shikoku Railway Company - Honshi-Bisan Line

- Utazu

=== Highways ===
- National Route 11

== Local attractions ==
- Gōshō-ji, temple 78 on the Shikoku Pilgrimage
- Shikoku Aquarium, the largest in Shikoku
