= Rare sugar =

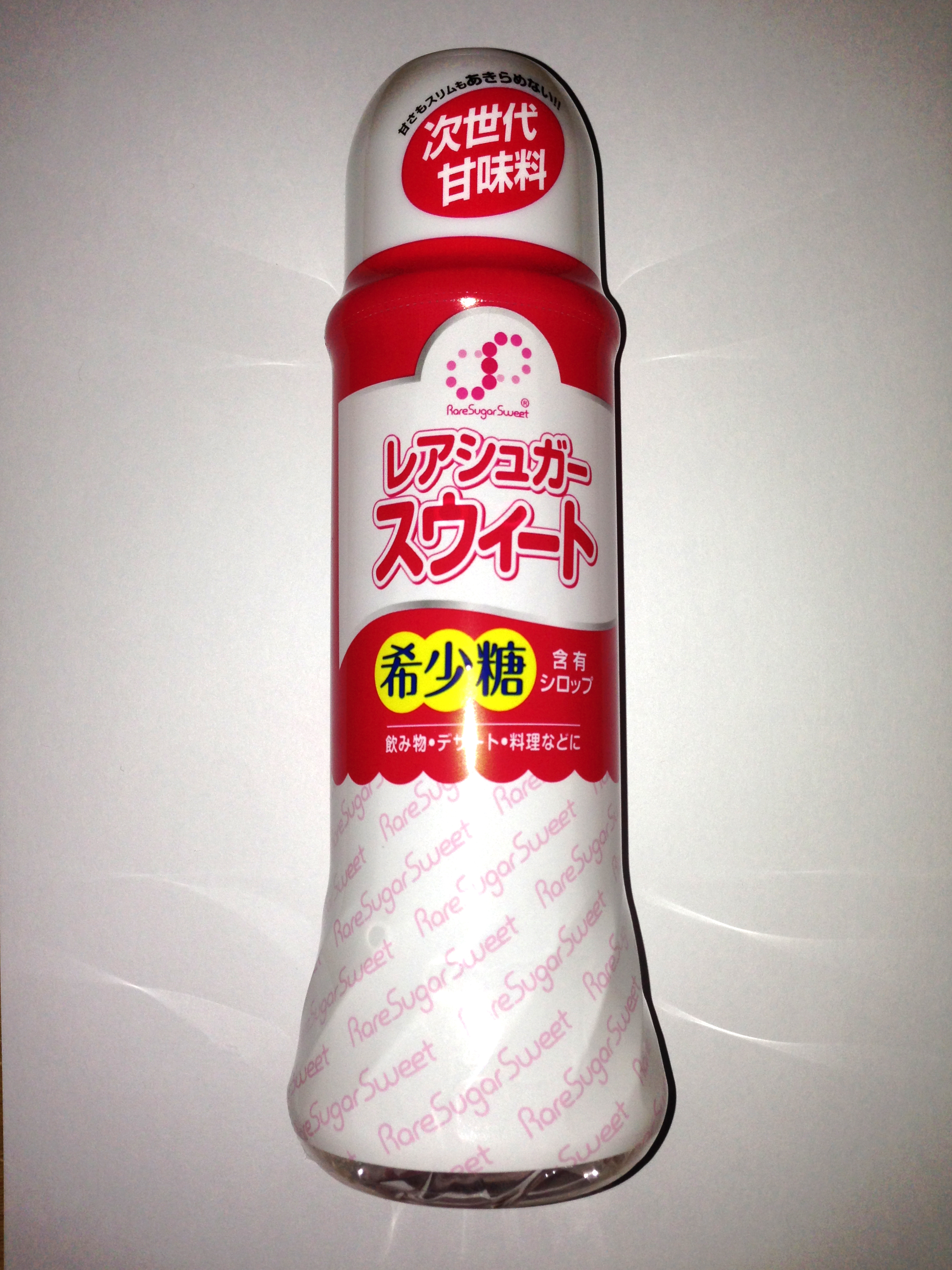
Japanese syrup that includes allulose, allose, and other rare sugars

Rare sugars are monosaccharide and their derivative that are rare in nature. Rare sugars can be made using enzymes, choosing which enzymes to use if you know the substrate can be aided by the Izumoring-strategy.

Specific examples of rare sugars are:

- L-Glucose
- D-Allulose
- D-Allose
- Sorbose
- D-Tagatose
- Xylitol
- L-Ribose

Rare sugars can also include oligosaccharides containing rare monosaccharides. Starting materials for production of rare sugars include common sugars, polyols and various building blocks.
