= Trinickia symbiotica =

Scientific classification
- Domain: Bacteria
- Kingdom: Pseudomonadati
- Phylum: Pseudomonadota
- Class: Betaproteobacteria
- Order: Burkholderiales
- Family: Burkholderiaceae
- Genus: Trinickia
- Species: T. symbiotica

Binomial name
- Trinickia symbiotica (Sheu et al. 2012) Estrada-de Los Santos et al. 2018

Type strain
- BCRC 80258; JPY-345; KCTC 23309; LMG 26032; NKMU-JPY-345

Synonyms
- Burkholderia symbiotica Sheu et al. 2012; Paraburkholderia symbiotica (Sheu et al. 2012) Sawana et al. 2015

Species of bacterium

Trinickia symbiotica is a gram-negative, catalase and oxidase-positive, aerobic, non-spore-forming, non-motile bacterium in the family Burkholderiaceae which was isolated from root nodules of a Mimosa in north east Brazil.
