= Trinickia soli =

Scientific classification
- Domain: Bacteria
- Kingdom: Pseudomonadati
- Phylum: Pseudomonadota
- Class: Betaproteobacteria
- Order: Burkholderiales
- Family: Burkholderiaceae
- Genus: Trinickia
- Species: T. soli

Binomial name
- Trinickia soli (Yoo et al. 2007) Estrada-de Los Santos et al. 2018

Type strain
- DSM 18235; GP25-8; KACC 11589

Synonyms
- Burkholderia soli Yoo et al. 2007; Paraburkholderia soli (Yoo et al. 2007) Sawana et al. 2015

Species of bacterium

Trinickia soli is a gram-negative, catalase and oxidase-positive strictly aerobic, non-motile bacterium in the family Burkholderiaceae which was isolated from soil and cultivated with Korean ginseng.
