= Kagawa University =

National university in Japan

Coordinates: 34°20′34.7″N 134°2′15.5″E

- 香川大学
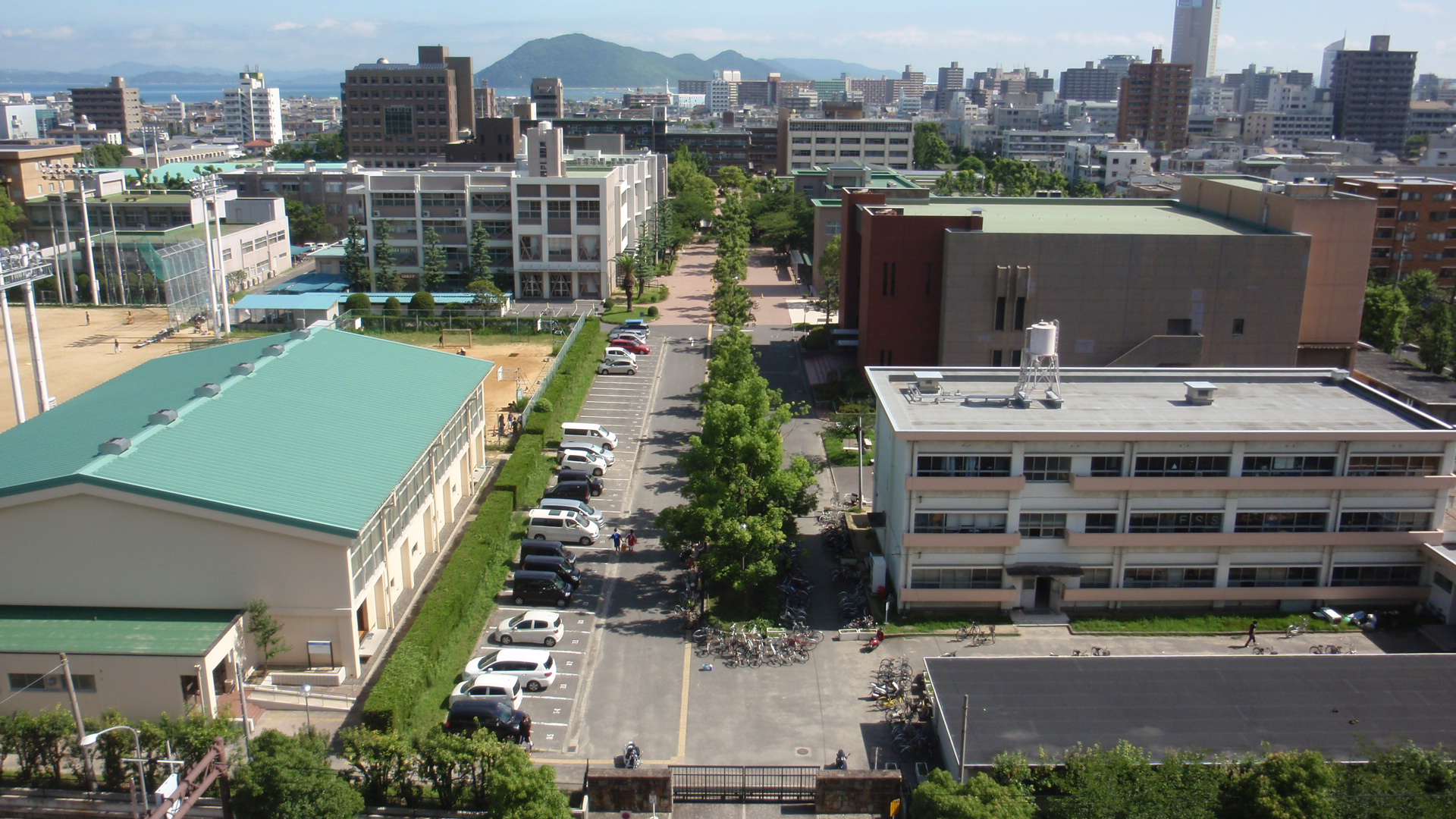
- Type: Public (National)
- Established: Founded 1874; Chartered 1949
- President: Yoshiyuki Kakehi (ja:筧善行)
- Students: 6,530
- Undergraduates: 5,713
- Postgraduates: 817
- Location: Takamatsu, Kagawa, Japan
- Campus: Urban
- Colors: Yellow-Green
- Mascot: None
- Website: kagawa-u.ac.jp

Kagawa University (香川大学, Kagawa Daigaku) is a national university in Takamatsu, Kagawa, Japan. Kagawa university has its roots in a vocational school founded in 1874. The university was established in 1949 as a national university after the consolidation and reorganization of the Kagawa Normal School, the Kagawa Normal School for Youth and the Takamatsu College of Economics (formerly the Takamatsu Higher School of Commerce). The Faculty of Economics is the oldest public specialized school in the Shikoku region. The business school is located in Takamatsu, where the main national government offices governing the four Shikoku prefectures and the branches of listed companies are concentrated. The Faculty of Agriculture conducts research into rare sugar. In cooperation with the Kagawa Prefecture, the university supports the Setouchi Triennale in both academic and cultural aspects.

== Faculties ==
- Faculty of Agriculture
- Faculty of Economics
- Faculty of Education
- Faculty of Engineering and Design
- Faculty of Law
- Faculty of Medicine

== Graduate Schools ==
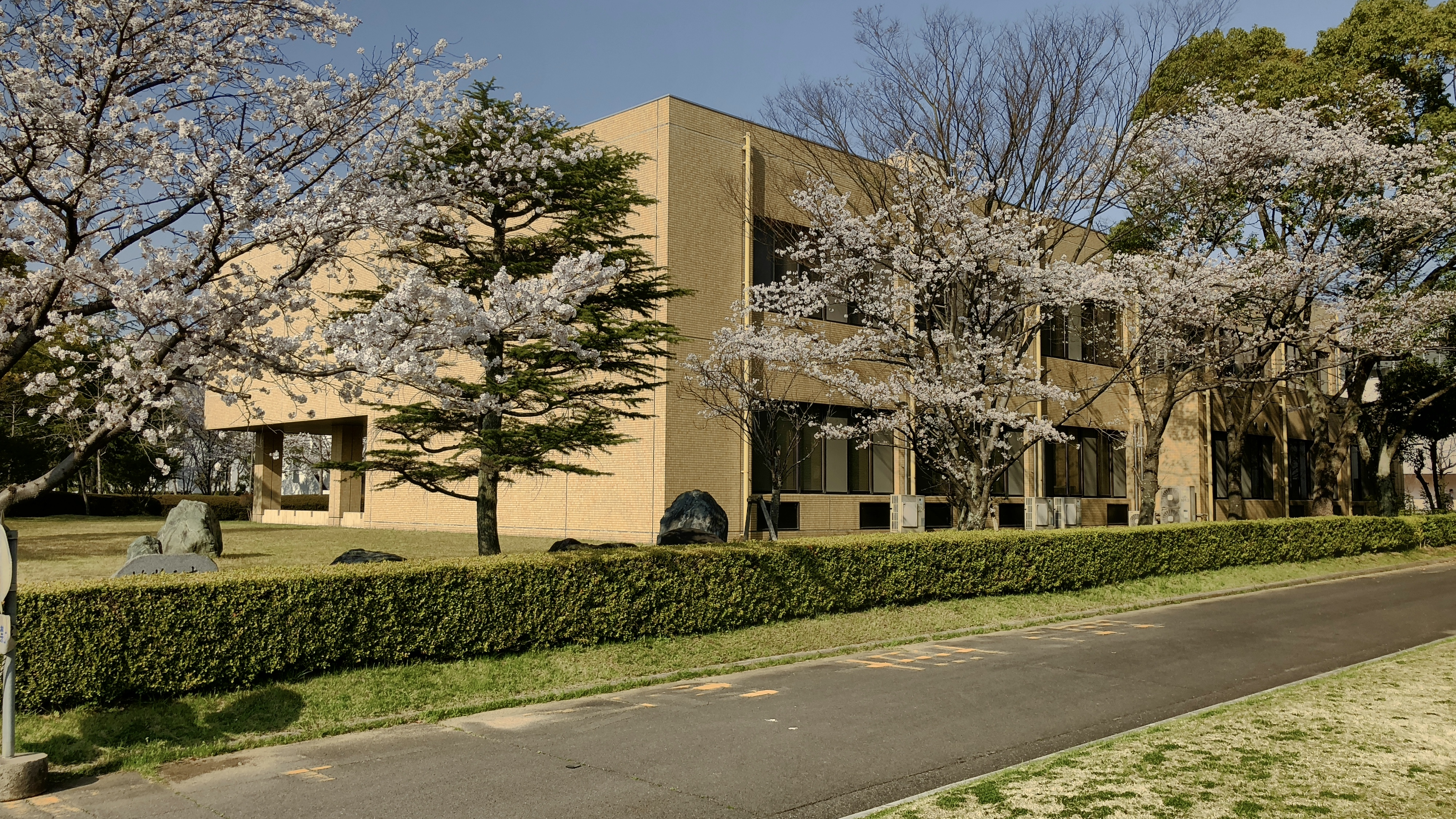

== Cubesat Experiments ==
=== STARS spacecraft ===
The Space Tethered Autonomous Robotic Satellite (STARS, aka STARS-1, aka KUKAI, COSPAR 2009-002G, SATCAT 33498) robotic spacecraft developed by the Kagawa Satellite Development Project in the Kagawa University consisted of mother and daughter satellites connected by a tether. The main mission was: separate the mother and daughter satellites deploying the tether between them in the process, document the deployment of the tether using an onboard camera and demonstrate that the daughter satellite can perform attitude control using the tether and a robotic arm. The satellite also had amateur radio capabilities.

STARS was launched 23 January 2009 as a secondary payload aboard H-IIA flight 15, which also launched GOSAT. It successfully separated from the rocket, but the tether failed to deploy "due to the launch lock trouble of the tether reel mechanism." As of June 2022, the satellite is still in orbit.

=== STARS-II ===
A follow-on Space Tethered Autonomous Robotic Satellite II, STARS-II, launched on 27 February 2014 as a secondary payload aboard an H-2A rocket. The experiment was only partially successful, and tether deployment could not be confirmed.

== Notable alumni ==
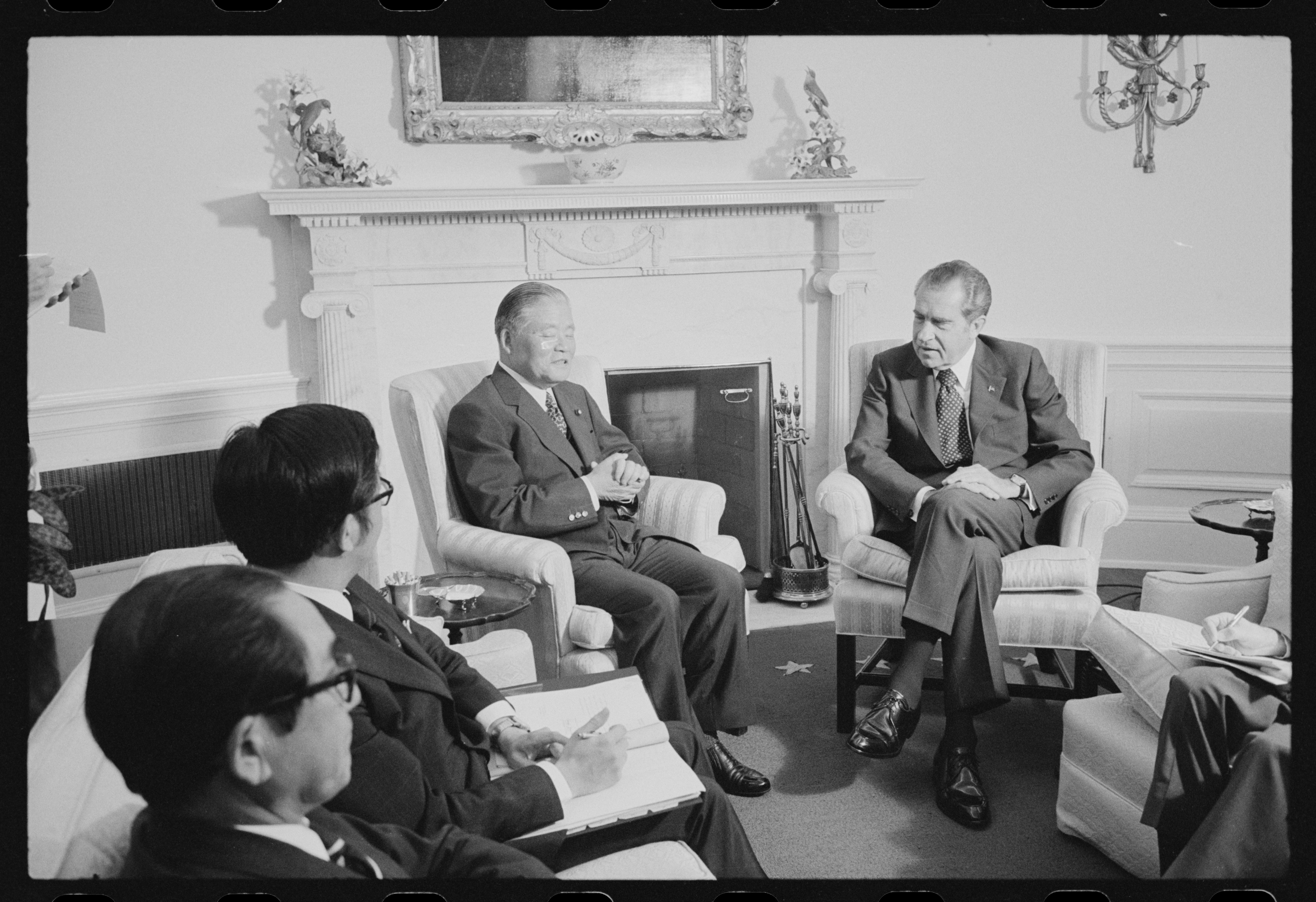
Masayoshi Ōhira and Richard Nixon

- Masayoshi Ōhira : Former Prime Minister of Japan
- Chuzo Mikami : Former Minister of Finance, Minister of Education
- Haruki Shiraishi : Former Governor of Ehime Prefecture
- Yoshinori Ohkoso : Founder of Nippon Meat Packers
