= Honshi–Bisan Line =

Railway line in Japan

Honshi-Bisan Line

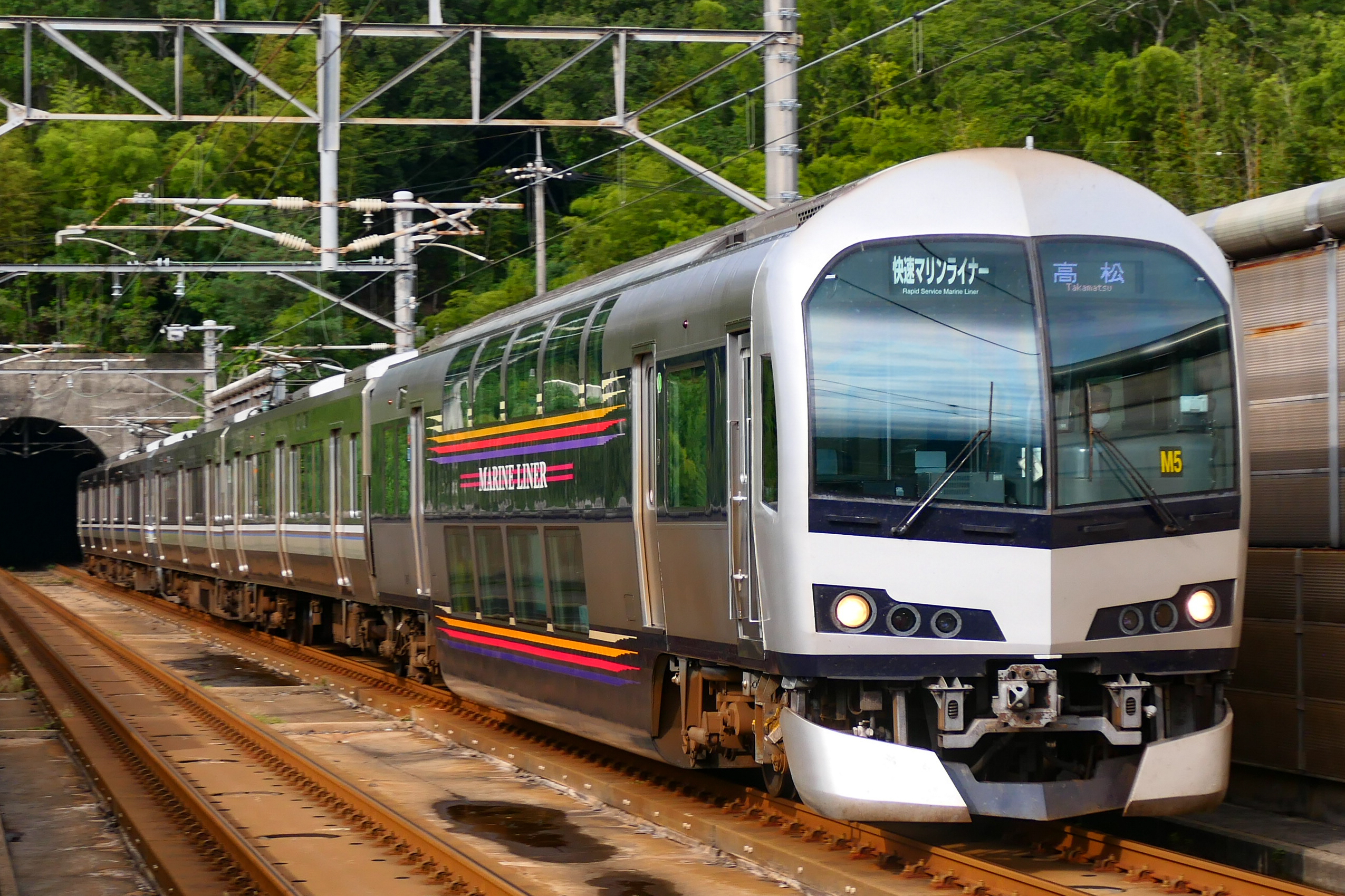
- Marine Liner on the Honshi-Bisan Line

Overview
- Owner: JR West, JR Shikoku
- Locale: Okayama, Kagawa prefectures
- Termini: Chayamachi; Utazu
- Stations: 6

Service
- Type: Heavy rail
- Operator(s): JR West, JR Shikoku, JR Freight

History
- Opened: 1988; 38 years ago

Technical
- Line length: 31.0 km (19.3 mi)
- Number of tracks: 2
- Track gauge: 1,067 mm (3 ft 6 in)
- Electrification: Overhead line, 1,500 V DC
- Operating speed: 130 km/h (81 mph)
Route map
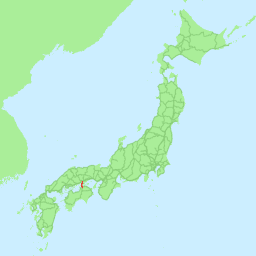

The Honshi-Bisan Line (Japanese: 本四備讃線, Hepburn: Honshi-Bisan-sen) is a Japanese railway line which connects Kurashiki in Okayama Prefecture with Utazu in Kagawa Prefecture. It is owned and operated jointly by West Japan Railway Company (JR West) and Shikoku Railway Company (JR Shikoku). The line is the central section of the Seto-Ōhashi Line, a service connecting Okayama and Takamatsu; as a result, the Honshi-Bisan Line is rarely referred to by itself, but rather as a part of the larger Seto-Ōhashi Line service.

The line's name comes from the two islands it links: Honshu and Shikoku, and the old provincial names of the areas through which the line passes, Bitchū Province/Bizen Province and Sanuki Province.

== History ==
The 13 km (8.1 mi) Chayamachi - Kojima section opened on 20 March 1988, and the 18 km (11 mi) Kojima - Utazu on 10 April 1988 in conjunction with the opening of the Seto-Ohashi Bridge system.

This provided the first rail connection between Honshu and Shikoku, prior to this passengers traveled via the Uno Line and train ferry to Takamatsu.

The opening of the line also facilitated electrification of the Yosan Line between Takamatsu and Matsuyama, enabling direct services from both cities to Okayama.

== Basic data ==
- Operators, distances:
  - West Japan Railway Company (JR West) (Services and tracks)
    - Chayamachi – Kojima: 12.9 km (8.0 mi)
  - Shikoku Railway Company (JR Shikoku) (Services and tracks)
    - Kojima – Utazu: 18.1 km (11.2 mi)
  - Japan Freight Railway Company (JR Freight) (Services)
    - Chayamachi – Kojima – Utazu: 31.0 km (19.3 mi)
- Gauge: 3 ft 6 in (1,067 mm) narrow gauge
- Stations: 6
- Double-tracked section: Entire line
- Electrification: 1500 V DC
- Railway signalling: Centralized Traffic Control (CTC)
- Maximum speed:
  - Chayamachi – Kojima: 130 km/h (80 mph)
  - Kojima – Utazu: 120 km/h (75 mph)
- CTC center:
  - Chayamachi – Kojima: Okayama Transport Control Center
  - Kojima – Utazu: Takamatsu Control Center

== Station list ==
No.	Station	Distance in km (mi)	Transfers	Location	
M08	Chayamachi 茶屋町	0 (0)	Uno Line	Kurashiki	Okayama
M09	Uematsu 植松	2.9 (1.8)		Okayama	Okayama
M10	Kimi 木見	5.6 (3.5)		Kurashiki	Okayama
M11	Kaminochō 上の町	9.7 (6.0)		Kurashiki	Okayama
M12	Kojima 児島	12.9 (8.0)		Kurashiki	Okayama
Great Seto Bridge Border between JR West and JR Shikoku
Y09	Utazu 宇多津	31.0 (19.3)	■ Yosan Line	Utazu, Ayauta District	Kagawa

== See also ==
- List of railway lines in Japan
