= L-Glucose =

L-isomer of glucose

l-Glucose

- Haworth projection of α-l-glucopyranose

- Fischer projection of l-glucose

Names
- IUPAC name l-Glucose

Identifiers
CAS Number	921-60-8
3D model (JSmol)	Interactive image
Abbreviations	L-Glc
ChEBI	CHEBI:37627
ChemSpider	2006622
EC Number	213-068-3
PubChem CID	2724488
UNII	02833ISA66
- InChI: InChI=1S/C6H12O6/c7-1-2-3(8)4(9)5(10)6(11)12-2/h2-11H,1H2/t2-,3-,4+,5-,6?/m0/s1 Key: WQZGKKKJIJFFOK-ZZWDRFIYSA-N; InChI=1/C6H12O6/c7-1-2-3(8)4(9)5(10)6(11)12-2/h2-11H,1H2/t2-,3-,4+,5-,6?/m0/s1 Key: WQZGKKKJIJFFOK-ZZWDRFIYBQ
- SMILES: O[C@@H]1[C@@H](O)[C@@H](OC(O)[C@H]1O)CO

Properties
Chemical formula	C_{6}H_{12}O_{6}
Molar mass	180.156 g·mol^{−1}
Density	1.54 g/cm^{3}
Solubility in water	91 g/100 mL

Hazards
Safety data sheet (SDS)	ICSC 0865
- Except where otherwise noted, data are given for materials in their standard state (at 25 °C [77 °F], 100 kPa). verify (what is ?) Infobox references

l-Glucose is an organic compound with formula C_{6}H_{12}O_{6} or O=CH[CH(OH)]_{5}H, specifically one of the aldohexose monosaccharides. As the l-isomer of glucose, it is the enantiomer of the more common d-glucose.

l-Glucose does not occur naturally in living organisms, but can be synthesized in the laboratory. l-Glucose is indistinguishable in taste from d-glucose, but cannot be used by living organisms as a source of energy because it cannot be phosphorylated by hexokinase, the first enzyme in the glycolysis pathway. One of the known exceptions is Trinickia caryophylli, a plant pathogenic bacterium, which contains the enzyme d-threo-aldose 1-dehydrogenase which is capable of oxidizing l-glucose.

Like the d-isomer, l-glucose usually occurs as one of four cyclic structural isomers—α- and β-l-glucopyranose (the most common, with a six-atom ring), and α- and β-l-glucofuranose (with a five-atom ring). In water solution, these isomers interconvert in matters of hours, with the open-chain form as an intermediate stage.

== Uses ==
l-Glucose was once proposed as a low-calorie sweetener and it is suitable for patients with diabetes mellitus, but it was never marketed due to excessive manufacturing costs.

The acetate derivative of l-glucose, l-glucose pentaacetate, was found to stimulate insulin release, and might therefore be of therapeutic value for type 2 diabetes.

l-Glucose was also found to be a laxative, and has been proposed as a colon-cleansing agent which would not produce the disruption of fluid and electrolyte levels associated with the significant liquid quantities of bad-tasting osmotic laxatives conventionally used in preparation for colonoscopy.
