= Utazu Station =

Railway station in Utazu, Kagawa Prefecture, Japan

Y09 Utazu Station 宇多津駅
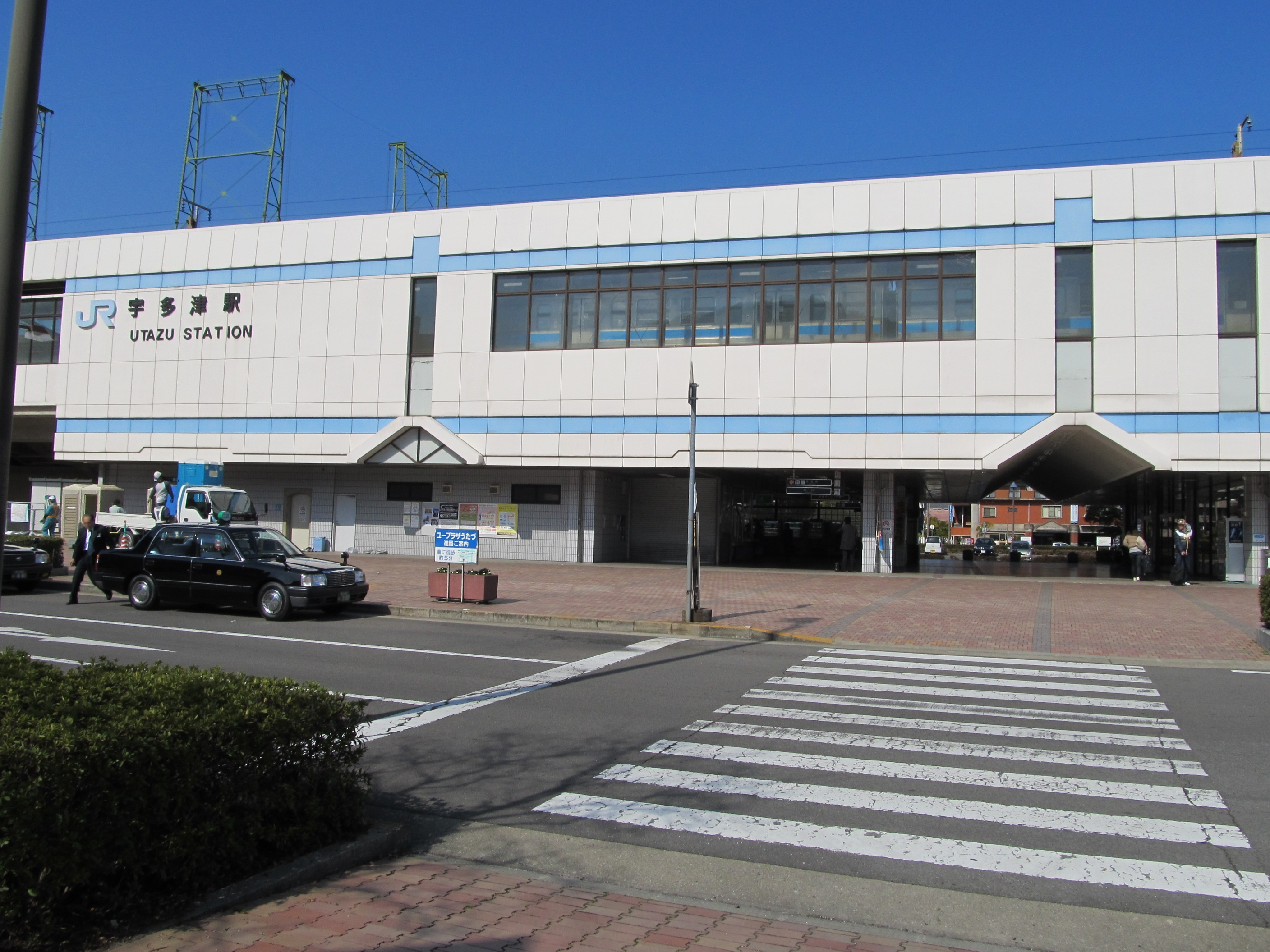
- Utazu Station South exit

General information
- Location: 49, Hama-Gobancho, Utazu Town, Ayauta District, Kagawa Prefecture; Japan
- Coordinates: 34°18′23″N 133°48′50″E
- Operator: JR Shikoku
- Line: Yosan Line
- Distance: 25.9 km (16.1 mi) from Takamatsu
- Platforms: 2 island platforms
- Connections: Bus terminal

Construction
- Structure type: Elevated

Other information
- Status: Staffed ( Midori no Madoguchi)
- Station code: Y09

History
- Opened: 21 February 1897; 129 years ago

Passengers
- FY2023: 2,244

Services
Preceding station	JR Shikoku	Following station
Marugame Y10 towards Uwajima	Yosan Line	Sakaide Y08 towards Takamatsu
Terminus	Honshi-Bisan Line	Kojima towards
Limited Express
Kojima Terminus	Uzushio	Takamatsu Y00 T28 towards Tokushima
Track layout
Location
- Location within Kagawa Prefecture Location within Japan

Utazu Station (宇多津駅, Utazu-eki) is a passenger railway station located in the town of Utazu, Ayauta District, Kagawa Prefecture, Japan. It is operated by JR Shikoku and has the station number "Y09".

== Lines ==
The station is served by the JR Shikoku Yosan Line and is located 25.9 km from the beginning of the line at Takamatsu. Trains of Honshi Bisan Line (Seto Ohashi Line), also terminate at this station. All passenger trains on the Yosan Line, and trains that directly run between the Honshi Bisan Line and Tadotsu Station on the Yosan Line, stop at this station, except for some limited express trains and special trains in the early morning and at night. At this station, the limited express trains Shiokaze/Ishizuchi, Minamifu/Shimanto, and Minamifu/Uzushio are divided and merged.

== Layout ==
Utazu Station consists of two elevated island platforms serving four tracks. The station has a Midori no Madoguchi staffed ticket office.

== Adjacent stations ==
«	Service	»
Honshi-Bisan Line
Rapid Marine Liner: Does not stop at this station
Sleeper Limited Express Sunrise Seto: Does not stop at this station
Kojima	Limited Express Uzushio / Shiokaze	Yosan Line
Yosan Line
Rapid Marine Liner: Does not stop at this station
Sleeper Limited Express Sunrise Seto: Does not stop at this station
Sakaide	Rapid Sun Port	Terminus

== History ==
Utazu Station opened on 21 February 1897, as a station on the Sanuki Railway. The Sanuki Railway became part of the Sanyo Railway in 1904, and was nationalized in 1906. With the privatization of the Japanese National Railways (JNR) on 1 April 1987, control of the station passed to JR Shikoku.

== Surrounding area ==
- Marugame Hirai Art Museum
- Kagawa Junior College
- Shikoku Medical College
- Utazu Municipal Utazu Kita Elementary School

== See also ==
- List of railway stations in Japan
