= Kibitsu =

Kibitsu may refer to:

- Kibitsu Station, railway station in Okayama, Japan
- Kibitsu Shrine (Bingo), the chief Shinto shrine of Bingo Province
- Kibitsu Shrine (Bitchū), the chief Shinto shrine of Bitchū Province
- Kibitsu-zukuri, a traditional Japanese Shinto architectural style typical for the Kibitsu Shrines
