= Magane Ichirizuka =

Distance marker in Okayama, Japan

- 真金一里塚 (Japanese)
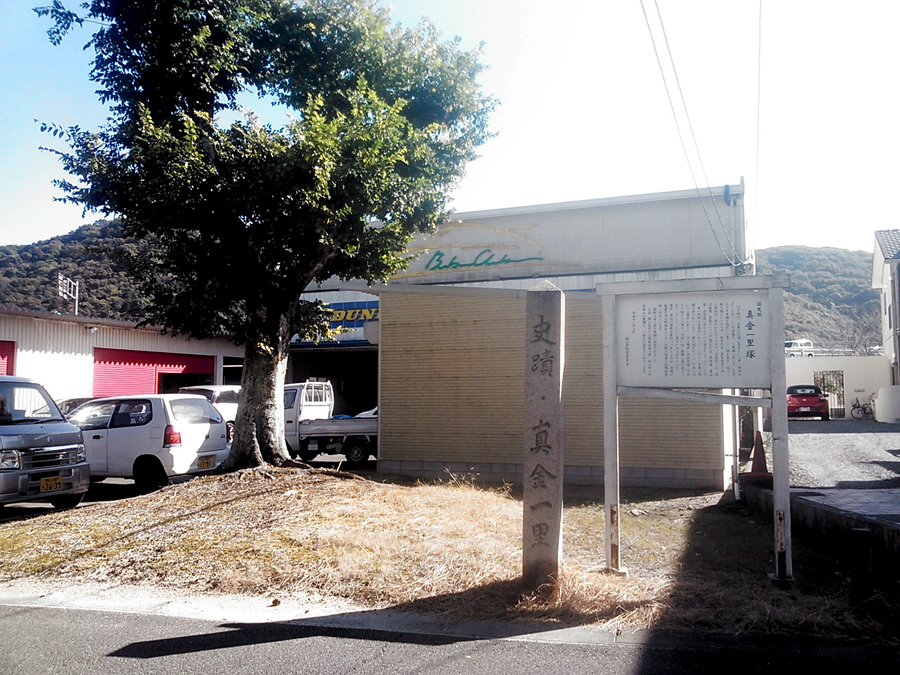
- Magane Ichirizuka, south mound

- Magane Ichirizuka Magane Ichirizuka (Japan)
- 36°22′40″N 139°50′28″E
- Periods: Edo period
- Location: Kita-ku, Okayama, Japan
- Region: San'yō region

Site notes
- Public access: Yes

The Magane Ichirizuka (真金一里塚) is a historic Japanese distance marker akin to a milestone, comprising a pair of earthen mounds located in what is now part of the Kibitsu neighborhood of Kita-ku, Okayama, Okayama Prefecture in the San'yō region of Japan. It was designated a National Historic Site of Japan in 1928.

== Overview ==
During the Edo period the Tokugawa shogunate established ichirizuka on major roads, enabling calculation both of distance travelled and of the charge for transportation by kago or palanquin. These mounds denoted the distance in ri (3.927 kilometres (2.440 mi)), typically to Nihonbashi, the "Bridge of Japan", erected in Edo in 1603. They were typically planted with an enoki or Japanese red pine to provide shelter for travelers. Since the Meiji period, most of the ichirizuka have disappeared, having been destroyed by the elements, modern highway construction and urban encroachment. In 1876, the "Ichirizuka Abolition decree" was issued by the Meiji government and many were demolished at that time. Currently, 17 surviving ichirizuka are designated as national historic sites.

In the case of the Magane Ichirizuka, the mounds flank the San'yōdō highway which ran for a total of roughly 145 ri (approx. 350 miles) from Kyoto to Shimonoseki. The San'yōdō was one of the major kaidō in western Japan and was the main route both for commercial travelers, but for daimyō fulfilling their sankin kōtai obligation to have to the Shōgun's court in Edo on alternate years. The Magane Ichirizuka is the first milestone that can be seen after entering Bitchū Province from Bizen Province, and is located near the border between Okayama Domain and Niwase Domain. Conversely, it the second marker when traveling west from Okayama. In addition, this ichirizuka also marks the starting point for the "Kibitsu-Kompira Route, a pilgrim's road connecting the important shrines of Kotohira-gū in Shikoku with Kibitsu Shrine in Bizen.

Originally, Japanese black pine trees were planted on the north side of the highway, and enoki trees on the south side, but today only the mound and stone marker remains.

The Magane Ichirizuka is about seven minutes on foot from Kibitsu Station on the JR West Kibi Line.

== See also ==
- List of Historic Sites of Japan (Okayama)
