= Kibitsu-zukuri =

Style of Shinto architecture

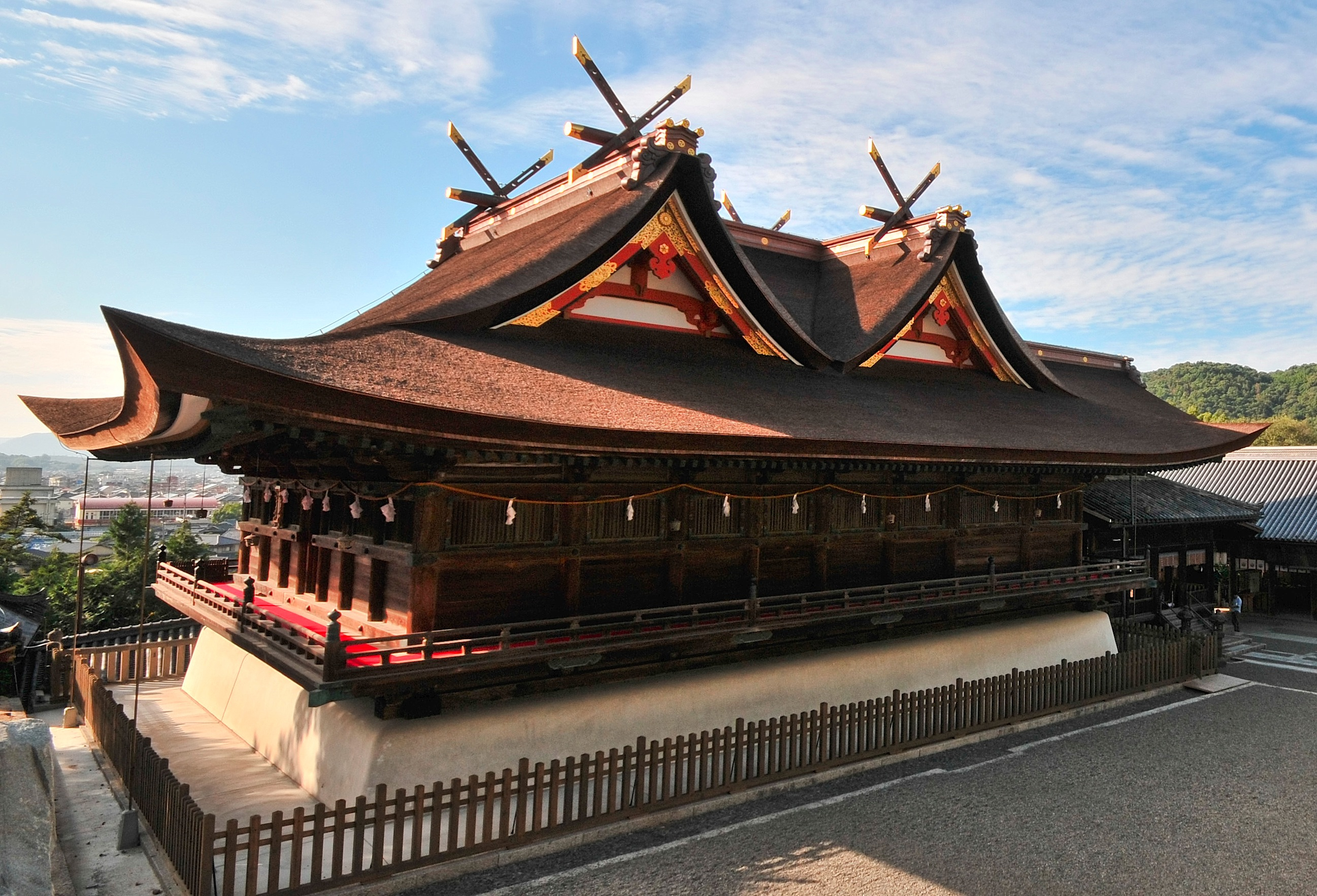
Kibitsu Shrine's honden-haiden complex. The main entrance (hidden) is on the right.

Kibitsu-zukuri (吉備津造), kibi-zukuri (吉備造) or hiyoku irimoya-zukuri (入母屋造; paired wing hip-and-gable roof style) is a traditional Japanese Shinto architectural style characterized by four dormer gables, two per lateral side, on the roof of a very large honden (sanctuary). The gables are set at a right angle to the main roof ridge, and the honden is part of a single complex also including a haiden (worship hall). Kibitsu Shrine in Okayama, Okayama Prefecture, Japan, is the sole example of the style, although the Soshi-dō of Hokekyō-ji in Chiba prefecture is believed to have been modeled on it.

== Structure ==
The shrine's floorplan

The T-shaped shrine is composed of two buildings: the haiden or prayer hall, in the front, and the honden or sanctuary, in the back, both under the same roof and joined by a short stairway (see floorplan). Both buildings show the clear influence of Buddhist architecture, as they include features of all major styles, that is Daibutsuyō, Zenshūyō and Wayō.

=== Honden ===
The honden, which shows strong daibutsuyō influences, is extremely large, measuring 14.64 x 17.99 m, or 5 (front) x 8 (depth) x 7 (rear) bays, with bays of a different length according to their position.

The honden's interior has a complex structure, being divided in six separate sections joined by six different stairways (see flooplan). At the very center of the honden are two sanctuaries, the nai-naijin (内内陣, inner inner shrine) which measures 3 x 2 bays, and the naijin (内陣, inner shrine), which measures 3 x 1 bays. The two sanctuaries are surrounded on all sides by two corridors called the chūjin (中陣, intermediate shrine) and the gejin (外陣, external shrine). Between the chūjin and the gejin lies a 5 x 1 bay space called kōhai-no-ma (向拝間, lit. 'toward prayer space'), (Note: A kōhai is a pent roof above the stairs of a shrine or temple) also called ake-no-dan (朱壇, crimson platform). The closer one gets to the center, the higher the floor and the ceiling. The ceiling's structure itself changes, as most of the chūjin and the entire gejin have no ceiling, and the roof is therefore exposed, whereas other sections have ceilings of different types. The nainaijin for example lies below the gables. The whole area is decorated with vermillion and black lacquer.

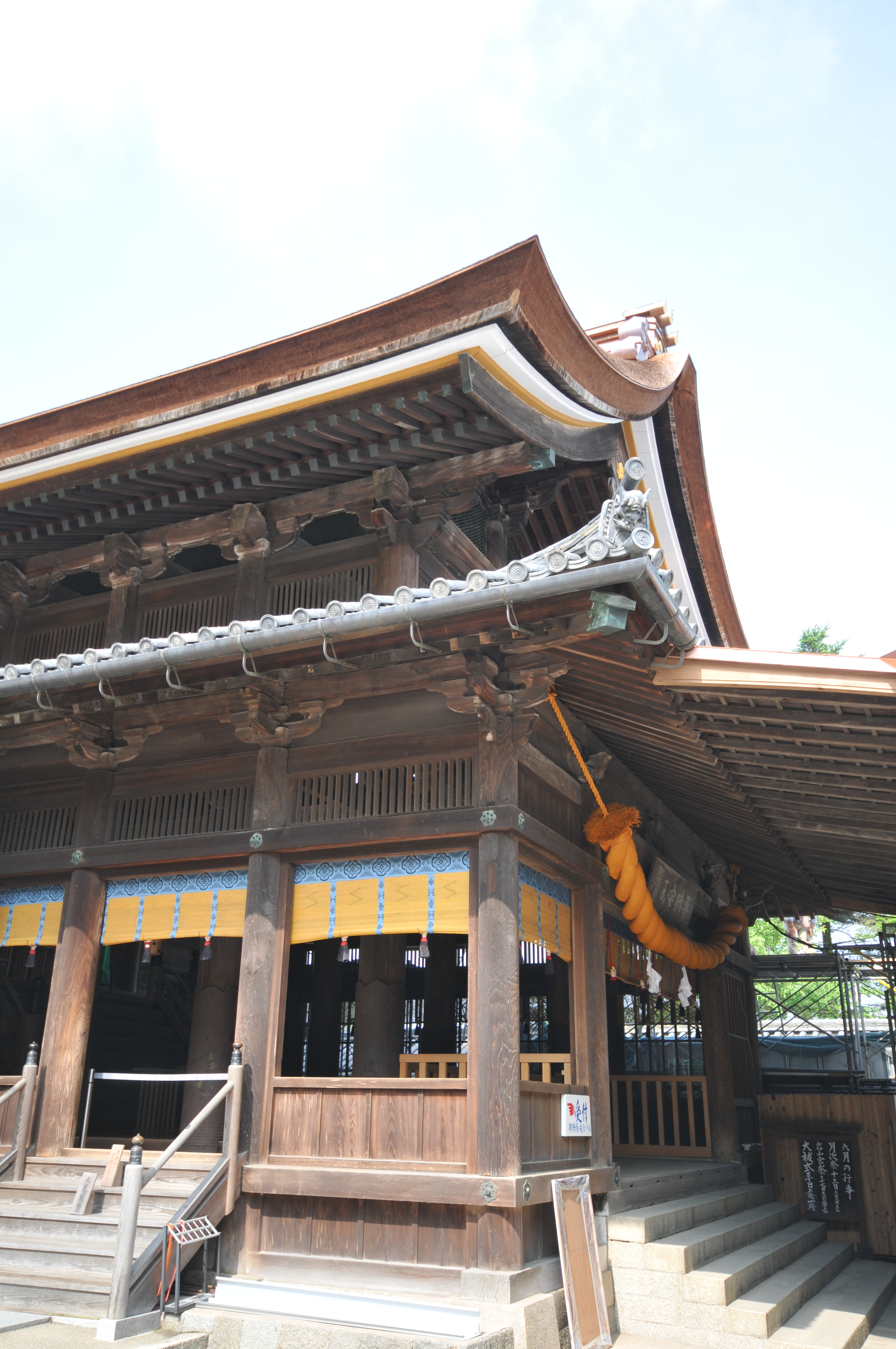
The haiden. The main entrance is on the left.

=== Haiden ===
The honden is connected in the front to the haidenby a 1 x 1 bay passage and a short stairway. The haiden's core is just 3 x 1 bays, but it is surrounded on three sides by a 1-bay wide mokoshi (pent roof), bringing the building's external dimensions to 4 x 4 bays. Both entrances to the haiden are on the gabled side (tsumairi style).

=== Roof ===
Together with the outsize honden, the most visible feature of the shrine are the twin gables on both sides of the roof. This style of roof, called hiyoku irimoya-zukuri, or "paired wing, hip-and-gable roof style", consists of two ridges at a right angle to the main roof which end in two dormer gables.

== See also ==
- Glossary of Shinto
