= Hokekyō-ji (Ichikawa) =

Buddhist temple in Chiba Prefecture

Coordinates: 35°43′15″N 139°56′57″E

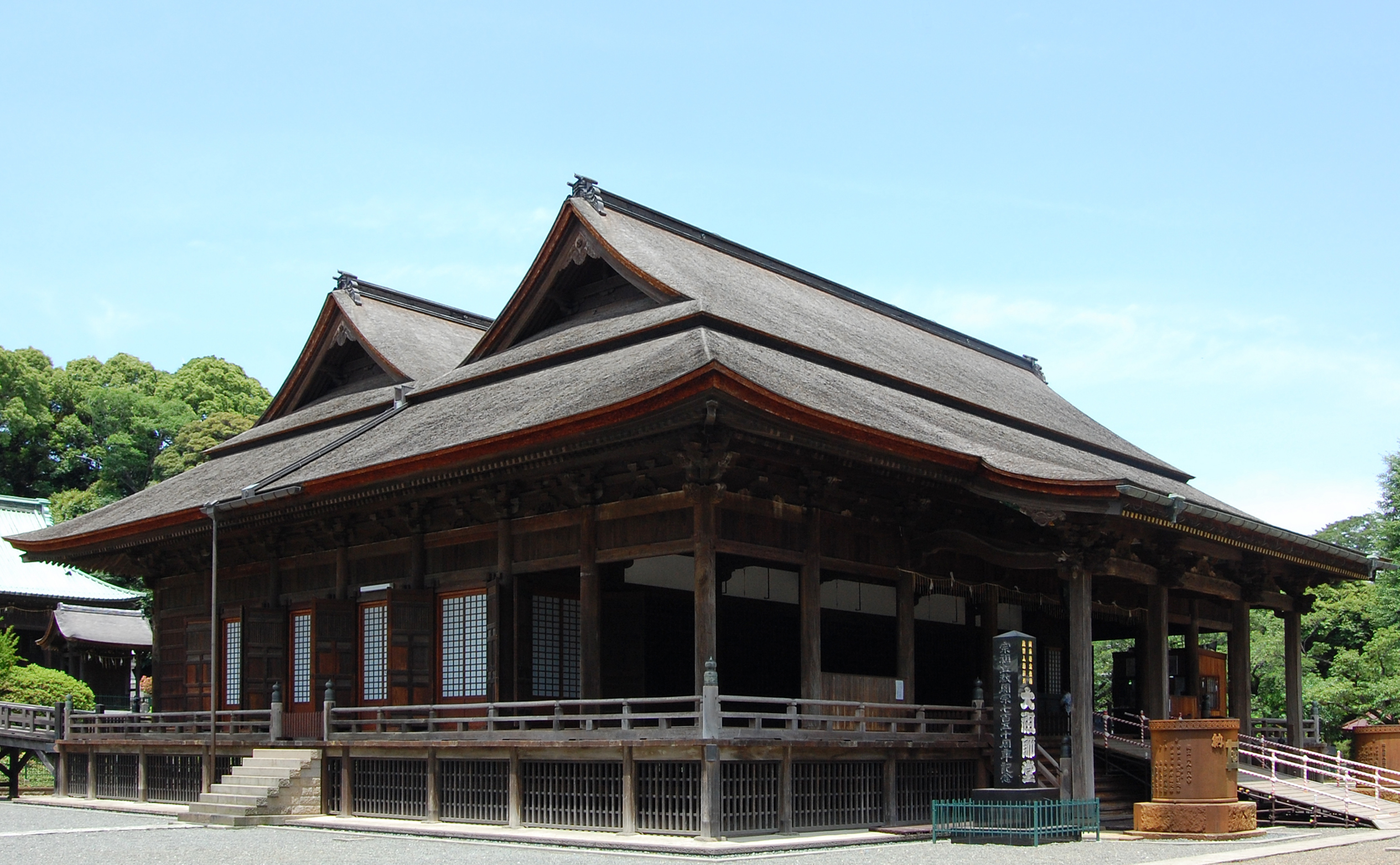
Soshidō (1678), an Important Cultural Property; believed to have been modelled on the Honden-Haiden of Kibitsu Jinja

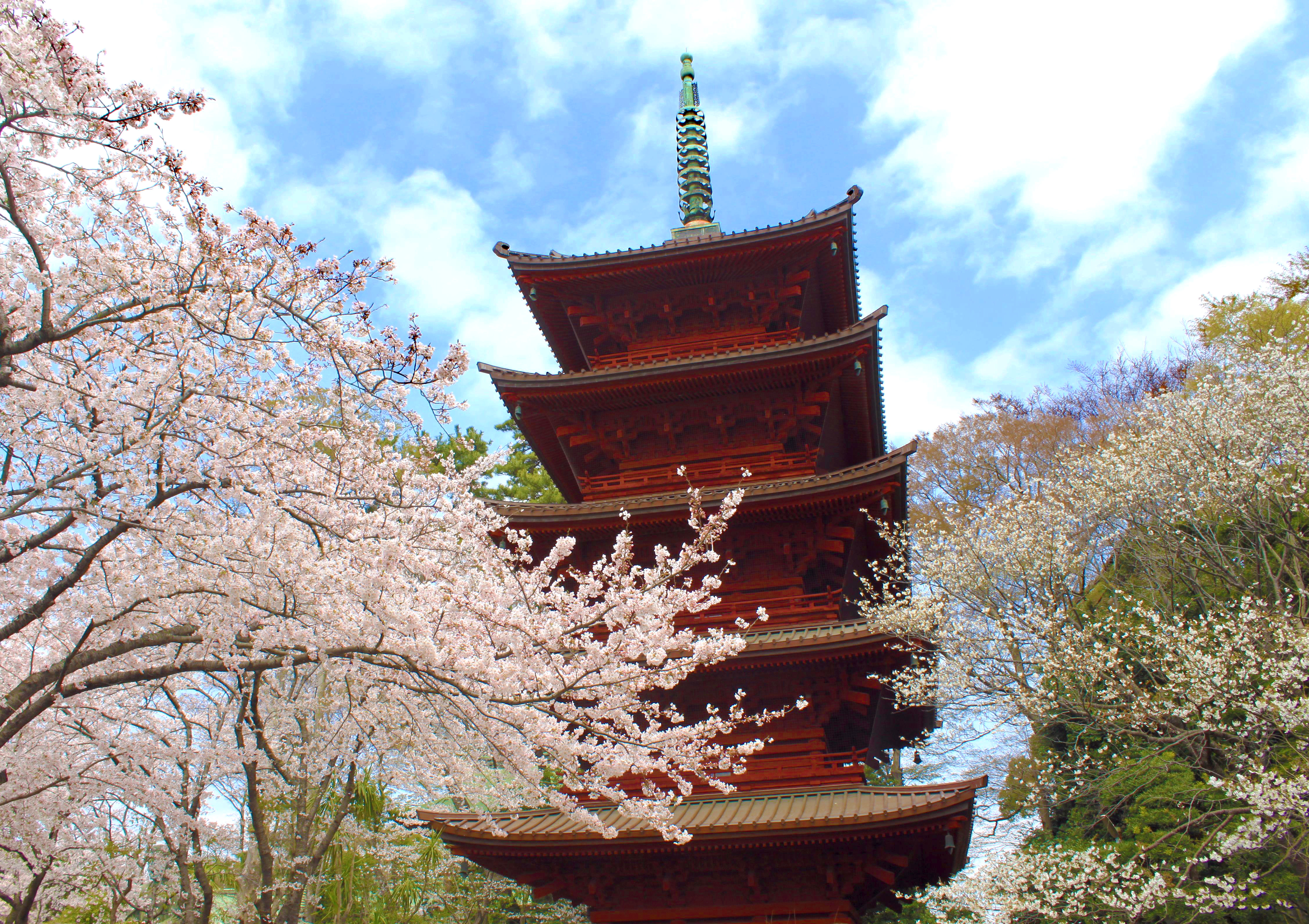
The Hokekyō-ji pagoda

Hokekyō-ji (法華経寺) is a temple of the Nichiren-shū founded during the Kamakura period in Ichikawa, Chiba Prefecture, Japan. One of Nichiren's most important writings the Risshō Ankoku Ron, regarded as one of the National Treasures of Japan, is kept at the temple. Next to other documents it is being presented to the public on 3 November each year.

== Buildings ==
- Shisoku-mon (Sengoku period) (Important Cultural Property)
- Hokkedō (Sengoku period) (ICP)
- Five-storey pagoda (1622) (ICP)
- Soshidō (1678) (ICP)

== Restoration of the Soshidō ==
When the Soshidō (祖師堂) was dismantled for repairs in 1987, evidence from the fabric and forty-five wooden tablets that were found suggested that the original form had been altered in the rebuilding of 1741. It was understood that originally the building resembled the Honden-Haiden of Kibitsu Jinja and, after an inscription was founded by the master carpenter of 1678 who came from that area, the hall was remodelled on that basis. A wooden shingle roof was installed and the old copper sold off for use by sculptors.

== See also ==
- Kibitsu Shrine (disambiguation)
