= Daianji Station =

Railway station in Okayama, Japan

Daianji Station 大安寺駅
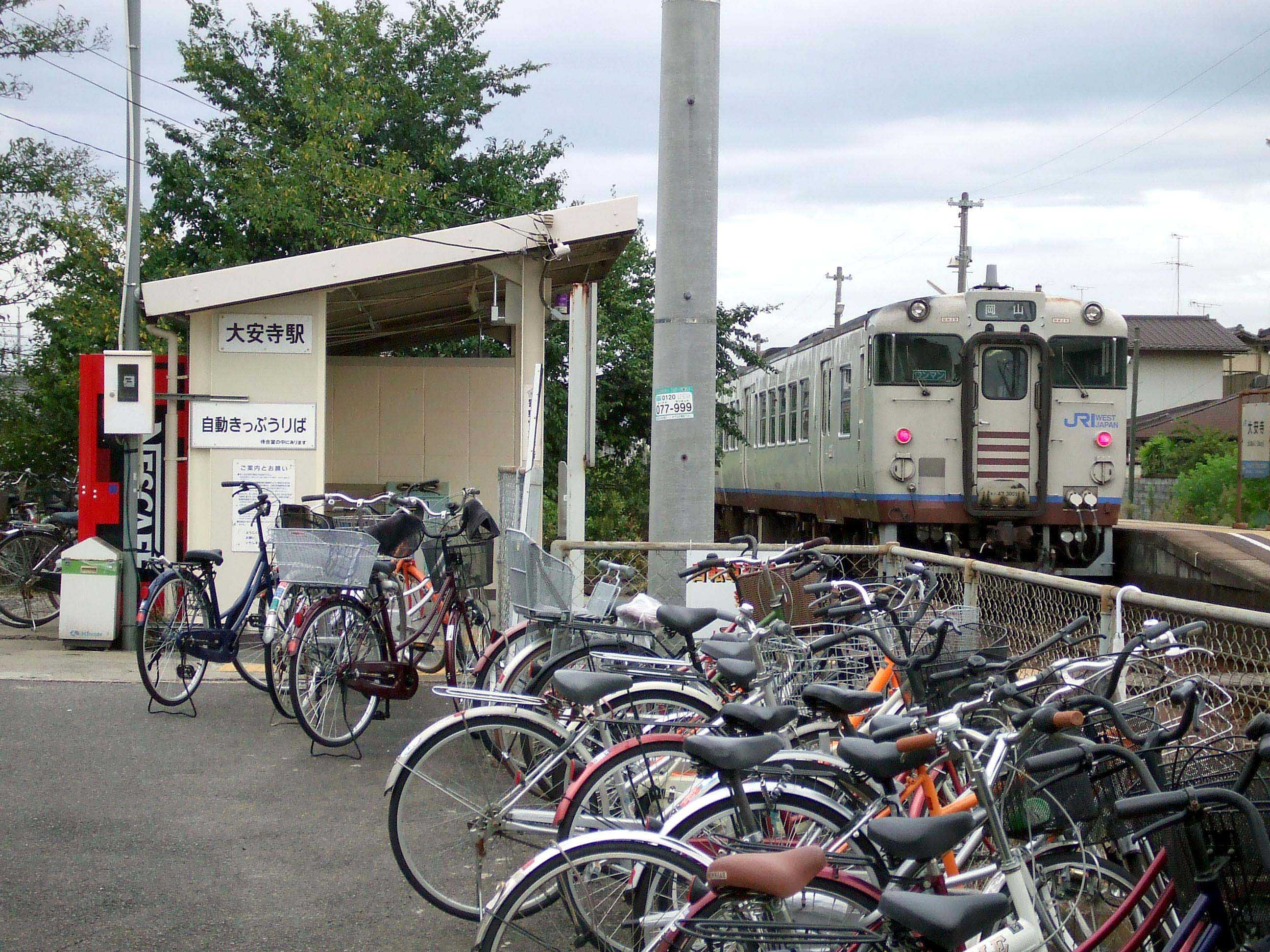
- Station building and platform in September 2007

General information
- Location: 5 Daianji Nakamachi, Kita-ku, Okayama-shi, Okayama-ken 700-0062; Japan
- Coordinates: 34°39′46.87″N 133°53′13.37″E
- Owner: West Japan Railway Company
- Operator: West Japan Railway Company
- Line: U Kibi Line
- Distance: 3.3 km (2.1 miles) from Okayama
- Platforms: 1 island platform
- Connections: Bus stop

Other information
- Status: Unstaffed
- Station code: JR-U03
- Website: Official website

History
- Opened: 25 February 1914

Passengers
- FY2019: 345 daily

Services
Preceding station	JR West	Following station
Bizen-Ichinomiya towards Sōja	Kibi Line Local	Bizen-Mikado towards Okayama
Location
- Location within Okayama Prefecture Location within Japan

Daianji Station (大安寺駅, Daianji-eki) is a passenger railway station located in Kita-ku of the city of Okayama, Okayama Prefecture, Japan. It is operated by West Japan Railway Company (JR West).

== Lines ==
Daianji Station is served by the Kibi Line, and is located 3.3 kilometers from the southern terminus of the line at Okayama.

== Station layout ==
The station consists of one ground-level island platform, connected to the small station building by a level crossing. The station is unattended.

=== Platforms ===
1	■ U Kibi Line	for Okayama
2	■ U Kibi Line	for Bitchū-Takamatsu and Sōja

== History ==
Daianji Station opened on February 25, 1914 as a temporary stop by a local merchant who was also a shareholder in the Chugoku Railway. It was upgraded to an official station on November 23, 1928. With the privatization of the Japan National Railways (JNR) on April 1, 1987, the station came under the aegis of the West Japan Railway Company.

== Passenger statistics ==
In fiscal 2019, the station was used by an average of 345 passengers daily.

== Surrounding area ==
- Hakata General Rolling Stock Yard Okayama Branch (former Okayama Shinkansen depot)
- Okayama Municipal Ono Elementary School

== See also ==
- List of railway stations in Japan
