= Higashi-Sōja Station =

Railway station in Sōja, Okayama Prefecture, Japan

Higashi-Sōja Station 東総社駅
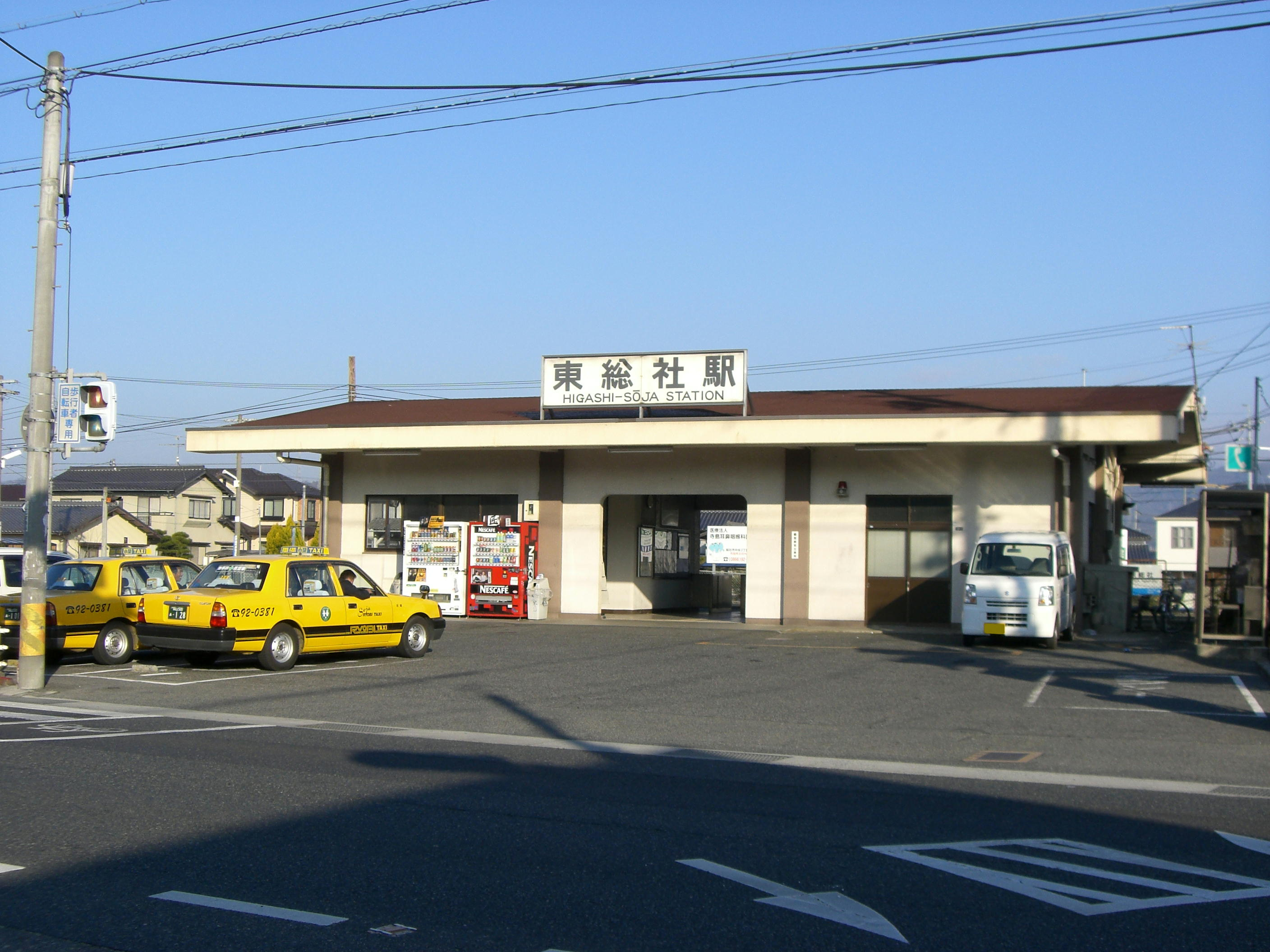
- Station building in January 2007

General information
- Location: 2-21 Sōja, Sōja-shi, Okayama-ken 719-1126; Japan
- Coordinates: 34°40′39.48″N 133°45′5.17″E
- Owner: West Japan Railway Company
- Operator: West Japan Railway Company
- Line: U Kibi Line
- Distance: 18.8 km (11.7 miles) from Okayama
- Platforms: 2 side platforms
- Connections: Bus stop

Other information
- Status: Unstaffed
- Station code: JR-U09
- Website: Official website

History
- Opened: 15 November 1904
- Former names: Sōja (to 1959)

Passengers
- FY2019: 932 daily

Services
Preceding station	JR West	Following station
Sōja Terminus	Kibi Line Local	Hattori towards Okayama
Location
- Location within Okayama Prefecture Location within Japan

Higashi-Sōja Station (東総社駅, Higashi-Sōja-eki) is a passenger railway station located in the city of Sōja, Okayama Prefecture, Japan. It is operated by West Japan Railway Company (JR West).

== Lines ==
Higashi-Sōja Station is served by the Kibi Line, and is located 18.8 kilometers from the southern terminus of the line at Okayama.

== Station layout ==
The station consists of two ground-level opposed side platforms, connected to the station building by a footbridge. The station is unattended.

=== Platforms ===
1	■ U Kibi Line	for Bitchū-Takamatsu and Okayama
2	■ U Kibi Line	for Sōja

== History ==
Higashi-Sōja Station opened on November 15, 1904, with the opening of the Kibi Line as Sōja Station (総社駅). It was renamed on October 1 1959. With the privatization of the Japan National Railways (JNR) on April 1, 1987, the station came under the aegis of the West Japan Railway Company.

== Passenger statistics ==
In fiscal 2019, the station was used by an average of 932 passengers daily.

== Surrounding area ==
- Sōja City Hall
- Bitchū Sōja Shrine
- Okayama Prefectural Sōja High School

== See also ==
- List of railway stations in Japan
