= Hattori Station (Okayama) =

Railway station in Sōja, Okayama Prefecture, Japan

Hattori Station 服部駅
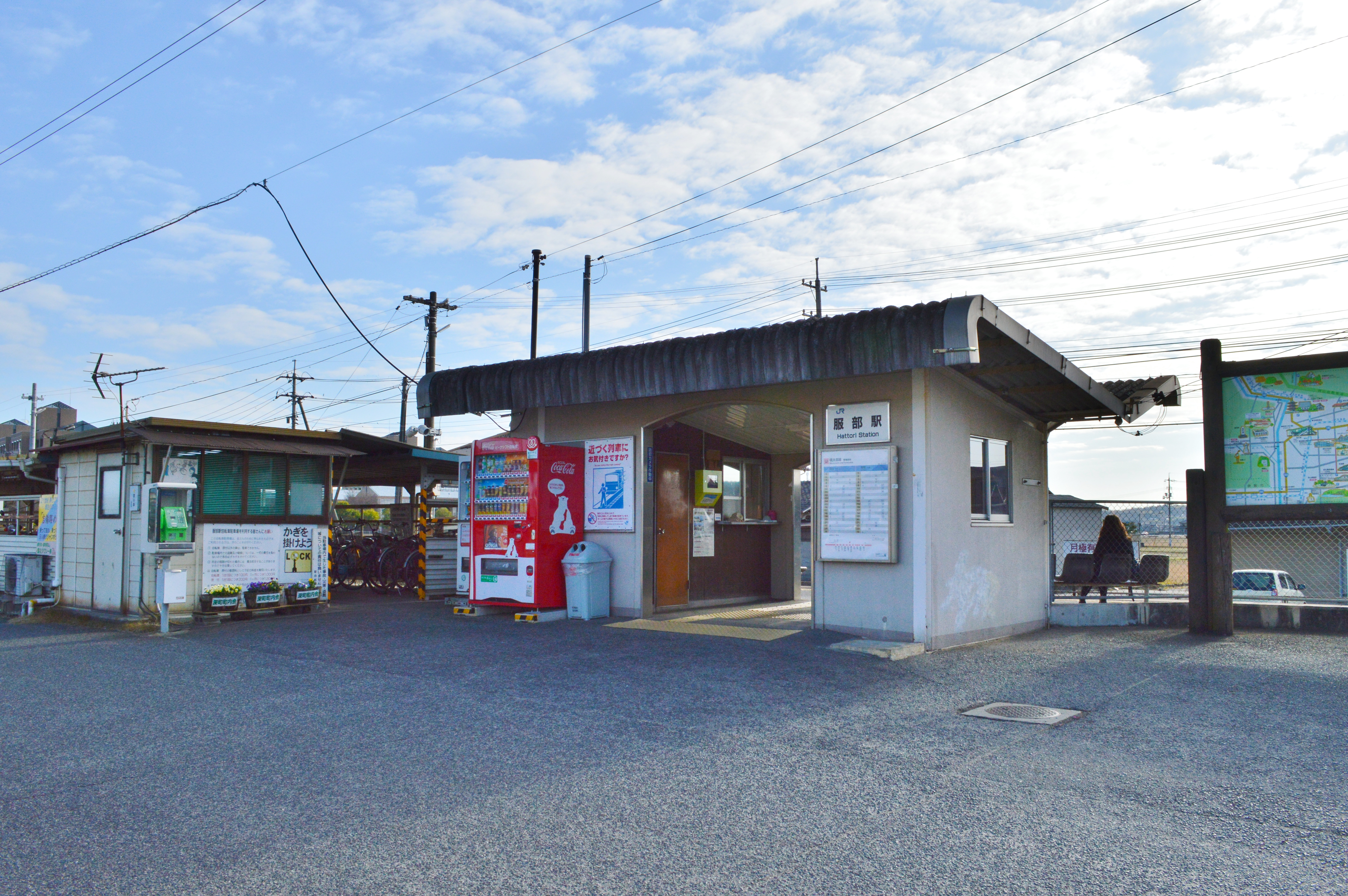
- Station building in December 2016

General information
- Location: 243-6 Kitamizote, Sōja-shi, Okayama-ken 719-1117; Japan
- Coordinates: 34°41′27.93″N 133°46′30.59″E
- Owner: West Japan Railway Company
- Operator: West Japan Railway Company
- Line: U Kibi Line
- Distance: 16.2 km (10.1 miles) from Okayama
- Platforms: 1 side platform
- Connections: Bus stop

Other information
- Status: Unstaffed
- Station code: JR-U08
- Website: Official website

History
- Opened: 20 April 1908

Passengers
- FY2019: 828 daily

Services
Preceding station	JR West	Following station
Higashi-Sōja towards Sōja	Kibi Line Local	Ashimori towards Okayama
Location
- Location within Okayama Prefecture Location within Japan

Hattori Station (服部駅, Hattori-eki) is a passenger railway station located in the city of Sōja, Okayama Prefecture, Japan. It is operated by West Japan Railway Company (JR West).

== Lines ==
Hattori Station is served by the Kibi Line, and is located 16.2 kilometers from the southern terminus of the line at Okayama.

== Station layout ==
The station consists of one side platform on the right side of a single bi-directional track when facing in the direction of Sōja, and the station building is next to the platform The station is unattended.

== History ==
Hattori Station opened on April 20, 1908. With the privatization of the Japan National Railways (JNR) on April 1, 1987, the station came under the aegis of the West Japan Railway Company.

== Passenger statistics ==
In fiscal 2019, the station was used by an average of 828 passengers daily.

== Surrounding area ==
- Okayama Prefectural University
- Japan National Route 180

== See also ==
- List of railway stations in Japan
