= Bizen-Mikado Station =

Railway station in Okayama, Japan

Bizen-Mikado Station 備前三門駅
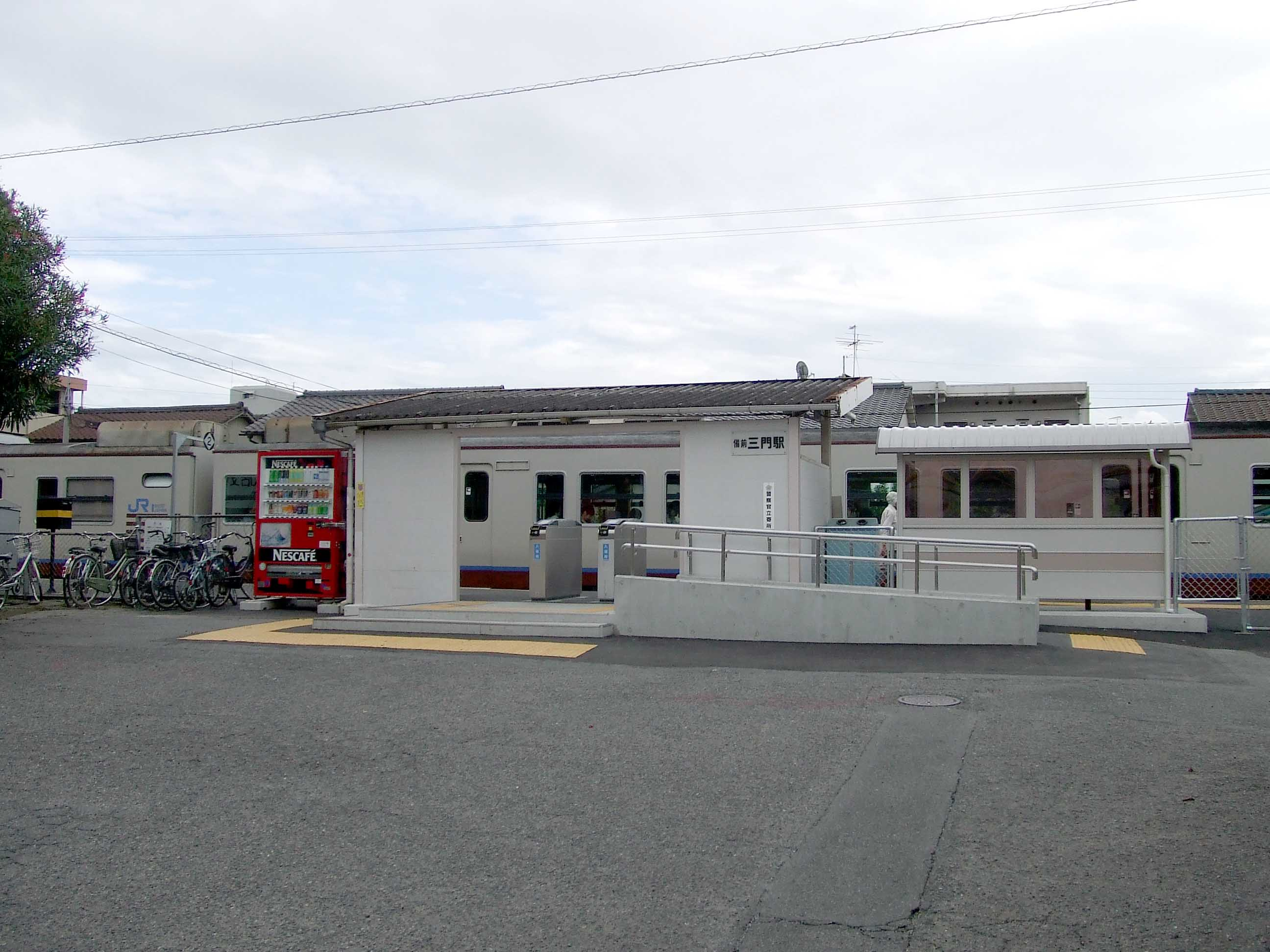
- Station platform in September 2007

General information
- Location: 14 Shimoifuku Kamimachi, Kita-ku, Okayama-shi, Okayama-ken 700-0051; Japan
- Coordinates: 34°40′4.1″N 133°54′1.56″E
- Owner: West Japan Railway Company
- Operator: West Japan Railway Company
- Line: U Kibi Line
- Distance: 1.9 km (1.2 miles) from Okayama
- Platforms: 1 side platform
- Connections: Bus stop

Other information
- Status: Unstaffed
- Station code: JR-U02
- Website: Official website

History
- Opened: 15 November 1904
- Former names: Mikado (to 1944)

Passengers
- FY2019: 1147 daily

Services
Preceding station	JR West	Following station
Daianji towards Sōja	Kibi Line Local	Okayama Terminus
Location
- Location within Okayama Prefecture Location within Japan

Bizen-Mikado Station (備前三門駅, Bizen-Mikado-eki) is a passenger railway station located in Kita-ku of the city of Okayama, Okayama Prefecture, Japan. It is operated by West Japan Railway Company (JR West).

== Lines ==
Bizen-Mikado Station is served by the Kibi Line, and is located 1.9 kilometers from the southern terminus of the line at Okayama.

== Station layout ==
The station consists of one ground-level side platform serving single bi-directional track. The platform is short and can accommodate only trains only four carriages, necessitating the use of a door-cut system during rush hours when longer trains are in operation. The platform is also sandwiched between road crossings on either end, and trains with more than four carriages block road traffic when stopped at this station. The station is unattended.

== History ==
Bizen-Mikado Station opened on November 15, 1904 with the opening of the Kibi Line as Mikado Station (三門駅). It was renamed June 1, 1944. With the privatization of the Japan National Railways (JNR) on April 1, 1987, the station came under the aegis of the West Japan Railway Company.

== Passenger statistics ==
In fiscal 2019, the station was used by an average of 1147 passengers daily.

== Surrounding area ==
- Kita Ward Welfare Office
- Kita Ward Health Center
- Okayama Prefectural Okayama Technical High School

== See also ==
- List of railway stations in Japan
