= Kibitsu Shrine (Bitchū) =

Shinto shrine in Okayama Prefecture, Japan

Kibitsu Jinja 吉備津神社
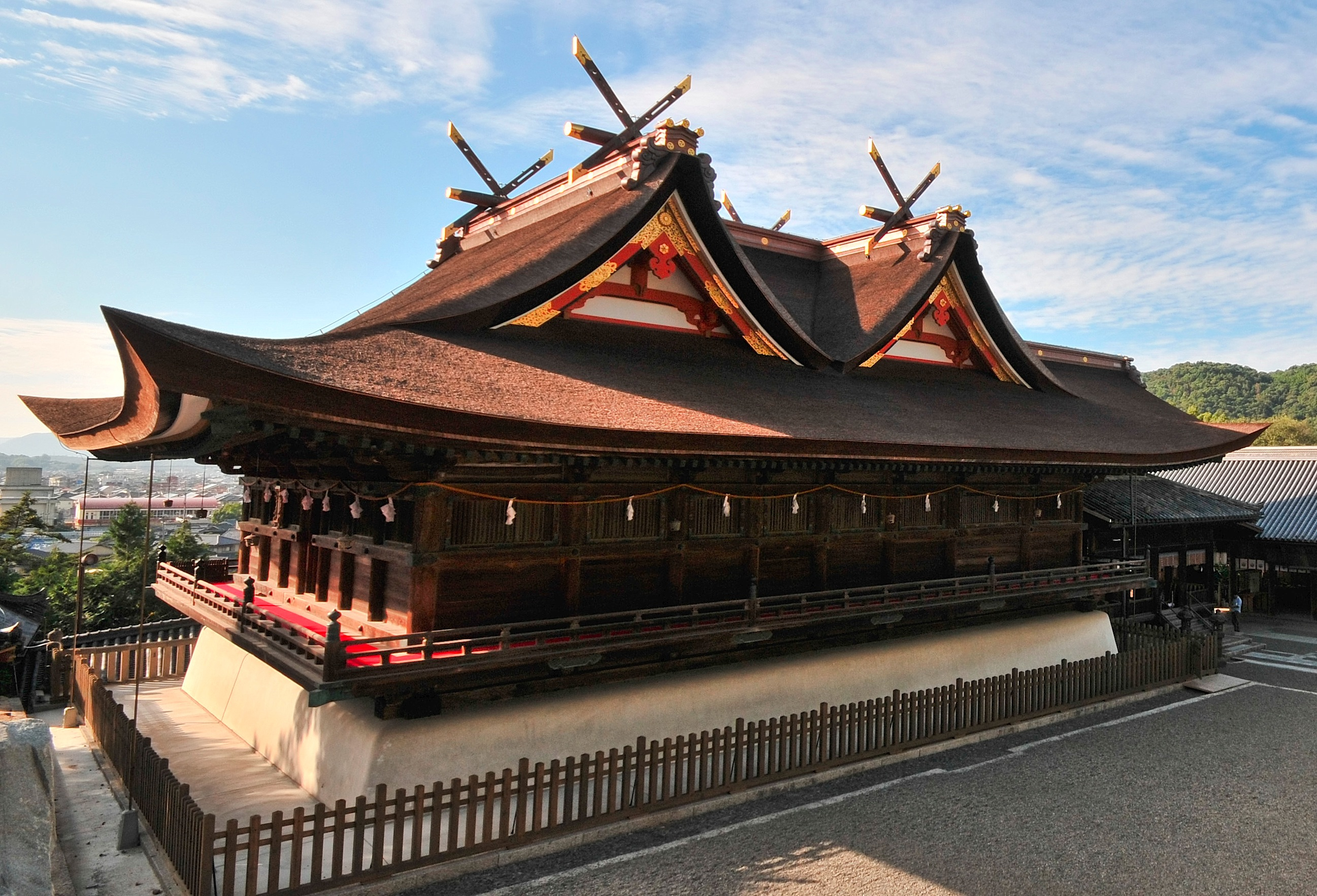
- Honden-Haiden (1425), a National Treasure

- Kibitsu Jinja Kibitsu Shrine (Bitchū) (Japan)

Religion
- Affiliation: Shinto
- Deity: Kibitsuhiko-no-mikoto
- Festivals: Second Sunday in May and October 15th each year

Location
- Location: 931 Kibitsu, Kita-ku, Okayama-shi, Okayama-ken 701-1341
- Interactive map of Kibitsu Jinja 吉備津神社
- Coordinates: 34°40′14.4″N 133°51′2.2″E

Website
- Official website

Kibitsu Jinja (吉備津神社) is a Shinto shrine in the Kibitsu neighborhood of Kita-ku, Okayama in Okayama Prefecture, Japan. It is the ichinomiya (first shrine) of former Bitchū Province. The shrine's main festivals are held on the second Sunday in May and October 15 each year.

== Overview ==
The Kibitsu Jinja is located in the western part of Okayama city within walking distance of Kibitsu Station. The shrine faces north at the northwestern foot of Mount Kibi no Nakayama (吉備の中山; elevation: 175 meters) on the border between former Bizen Province and Bitchū Province. The mountain has been worshipped as a sacred mountain from ancient times. Kibitsu Jinja was originally the general guardian of Kibi Province, but due to the division of Kibi Province into three provinces, it became the ichinomiya of Bitchū, and bunrei from this shrine created the ichinomiya of Bizen Province (Kibitsuhiko Jinja) and Bingo Province (Kibitsu Shrine).

The Honden-Haiden, which was re-built by Ashikaga Yoshimitsu, is a National Treasure and the sole exemplar of the kibitsu-zukuri style of architecture, although the Soshidō of Hokekyō-ji is now believed to have been modeled thereon. In addition, the three shrine buildings are designated as National Important Cultural Properties, and a special Shinto ritual "Narukama Shinji" is famous.

=== Mizuko and Sorei syncretism ===
The Shrine has a unique dual worship of Sorei or ancestral spirits alongside Mizuko kuyō or cults of miscarried babies.

The shrine started as a place for the Kibi clan. It has the clan's ancestors as gods. This gives the shrine a pure and protective feel. The ancestors are seen as good and helpful spirits. This is how the shrine connects with mizuko. Mizuko means the souls of babies who died early or were not born.

The shrine places the mizuko shrine next to the ancestor shrine. It also uses running water. This setup has several meanings:

1. The water purifies the souls of mizuko. Mizuko is linked to water.
2. Being near the ancestor shrine suggests these souls become kind and protective spirits.
3. As protective spirits, the mizuko guard those who remember them.

This way, the Kibitsu Shrine uses its ties to the Kibi clan. It creates a respectful place for mizuko. It links them to the shrine's ancestral and protective gods.

== Enshrined kami ==
The kami enshrined at Kibitsu Jinja are:

- Kibitsuhiko-no-mikoto (吉備津彦命), the son of Emperor Kōrei and conqueror of the Kingdom of Kibi and founder of the Kibi clan
- Mitomowake-no-mikoto (御友別命), descendant of Kibitsuhiko
- Nakatsuhiko-no-mikoto (仲彦命), descendant of Kibitsuhiko
- Chichihaya-hime-no-mikoto (千々速比売命), elder sister of Kibitsuhiko
- Yamato-totohimomoso-hime-no-mikoto (倭迹迹日百襲姫命), elder sister of Kibitsuhiko
- Hikosasukatawake-no-mikoto (日子刺肩別命), elder brother of Kibitsuhiko
- Hikosashikatawake-no-mikoto (彦刺肩別命), brother of Kibitsuhiko
- Hiko same ma no mikoto (彦寤間命), brother of Kibitsuhiko
- Wakahiko Takekibitsu Hikono-no-mikoto (倭迹迹日稚屋媛命), brother of Kibitsuhiko

== History ==
The origins of Kibitsu Jinja are uncertain. According to the shrine's legend, it is located at the site of Kibitsuhiko-no-Mikoto's residence, where he died at the age of 281, and was buried on the summit of the mountain. Afterwards, the residence was turned into a shrine, possibly by his fifth generation descendent Narumi Kaya, or by Emperor Nintoku, who visited Kibi Province where he built several shrines to commemorate Kibitsuhiko. However, the shrine does not appear in any historical documentation until the late Heian period, until entry in the Shoku Nihon Kōki dated 847 and the Nihon Montoku Tennō Jitsuroku dated 852. In the Engishiki it was given the rank of Myojin Taisha (名神大社) and the rank of ichinomiya of the province. From the Kamakura through the Sengoku period, was revered by the samurai, and there were frequent restorations of the shrine and donations of territory.

During the Edo period, the shrine's land became smaller. However, it still got a special land grant from the shogunate. This grant was for 160 koku of rice every year. There was a busy market near the shrine. People also visited teahouses and inns there. Inside the shrine area, there was a theater and a brothel. The shrine was a busy place along the San’yodō for travellers. This continued until the Meiji Restoration.

After the Meiji Restoration in 1871, it was listed as a National Shrine, 2nd rank (国幣中社, Kokuhei Chusha), and is 1914 was promoted to an Imperial Shrine, 2nd rank (官幣中社, Kampei Chusha).

The shrine is a ten-minute walk from Kibitsu Station on the JR West Kibi Line.

== Cultural Properties ==
=== National Treasures ===
- Honden and Haiden, Muromachi period (1390) and relocated their present locations in 1425.The main shrine has a Kibitsu-zukuri style roof, which consists of two Irimoya-zukuri roof are lined up in front and behind. The influence of Buddhist architecture can be seen in many details of the structure.

=== Important Cultural Properties ===
- South Zuishinmon (南随神門), Muromachi period (1357).
- North Zuishinmon (北随神門), Sengoku period (1543).
- Okama-den (御釜殿), Edo period (1612).
- Wooden statues of lion Komainu (木造獅子狛犬), one pair, late Kamakura to Nanboku-cho period, Located to the east and west of the Honden.

=== National Intangible Folk Cultural Properties ===
- Bitchū Kagura (備中神楽), performed at Kibitsu Shrine on the 10th of every month at the Ebisu Festival.

=== Okayama Prefecture Designated Tangible Cultural Properties ===
- Kairō (吉備津神社 回廊), Sengoku period (1573-1591); This corridor runs from the main hall through the Minami Zuishinmon Gate to the Gokuden and Okamaden. Its overall length is 398 meters, and it has a simple structure with a gabled roof, tiled roofing, sparse rafters at the eaves, and a decorative attic ceiling. The construction was funded by parishioners, and the same method was used for its maintenance and upkeep.
- Tachi sword (大太刀 銘 備州長船秀幸), Muromachi period (1459); The blade length is 127.2 cm, and the curvature is 3.9 cm. A work of the Osafune-based Kosori school. The obverse bears the inscription "Bishu Osafune Hideyuki," and the reverse bears the date 1459 (Choroku 3).
- Tachi sword (大太刀), Muromachi period (1459); The total length is 377 cm. It was made by Norimitsu, a swordsmith of the Bizen Osafune school. The inscription on the front reads, "Bishu Osafune Norimitsu, born 33 years old." The inscription on the back reads, "August 1446 (3rd year of Bun'an) Yakushi-dera Yagoro Kyūyō, born 21 years old".
- Gyōdō mask (行道面), Muromachi period (?); Gyōdō, also known as "Nerikuyo," is a religious ritual that reenacts the scene in which Amida Buddha, accompanied by bodhisattvas and deities, leads people to the Pure Land. This mask is thought to have been used in a ceremony at Kibitsu Shrine's Jinguji temple.
- Goryeo Edition of the Complete Buddhist Canon (高麗版一切経), Goryeo Dynasty; This printed sutra in 994 volumes was brought back by Konishi Yukinaga during the Japanese invasion of Korea.
- Renga poetry written in ink on paper (紙本墨書連歌), Muromachi period (1401); This renga poem was dedicated to Kibitsu Shrine in 1401, collecting only the opening lines of 10,000 verses from a Horaku renga (linked poetry dedicated to the gods and Buddha). The author's name is listed at the end of the volume. It measures 35 by 640-cm.

== Gallery ==
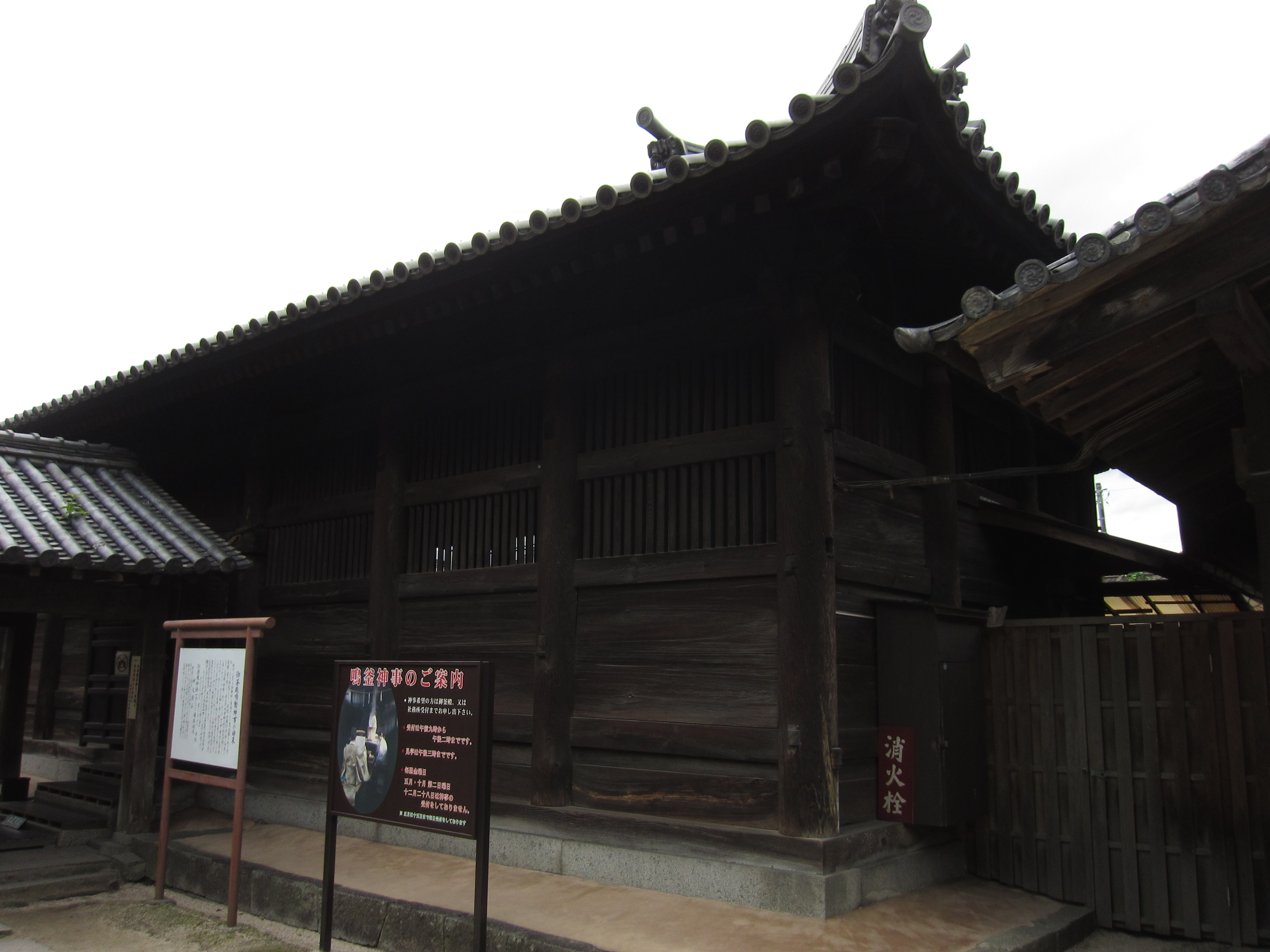
Okamaden（ICP）

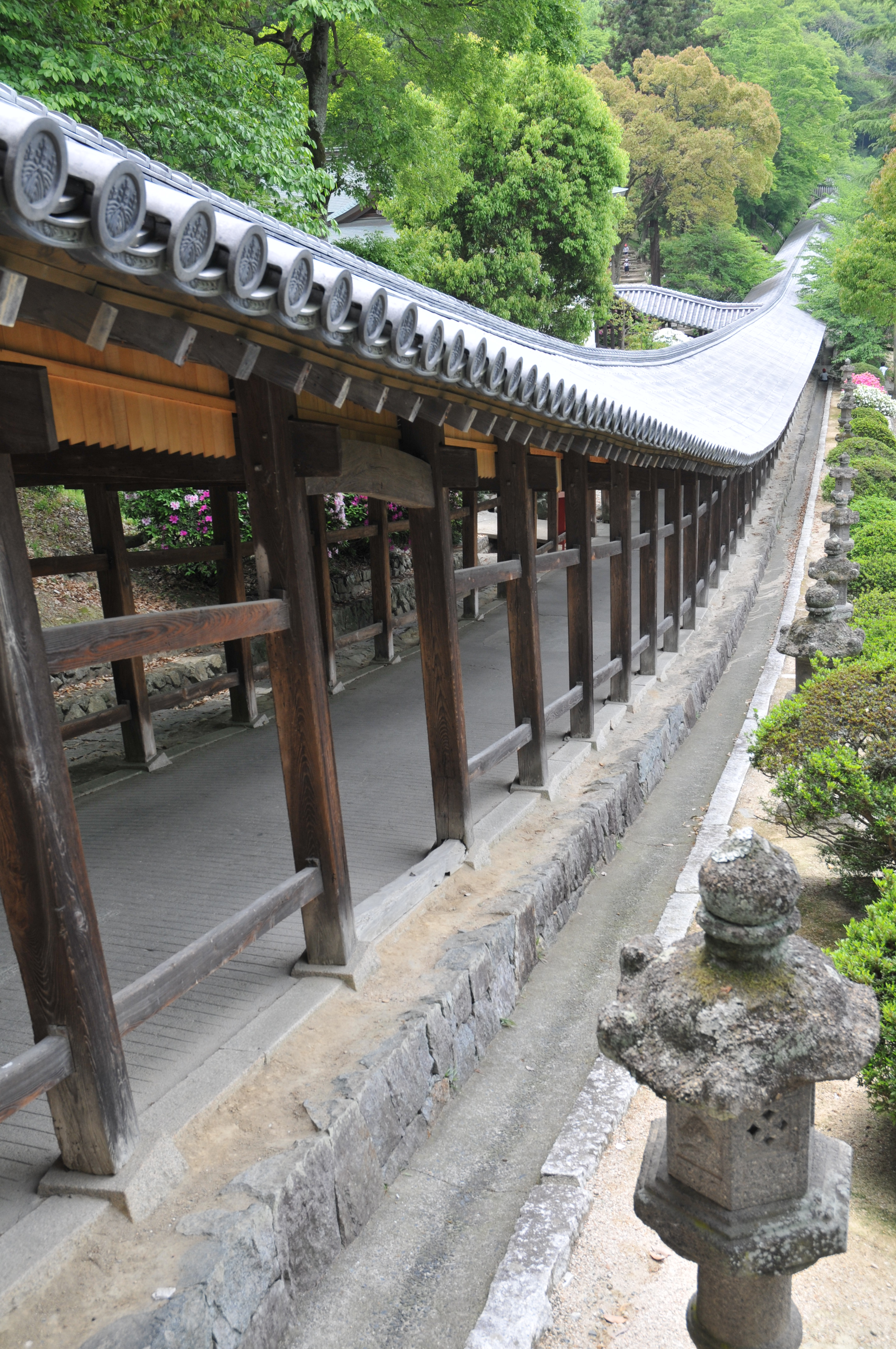
Cloister

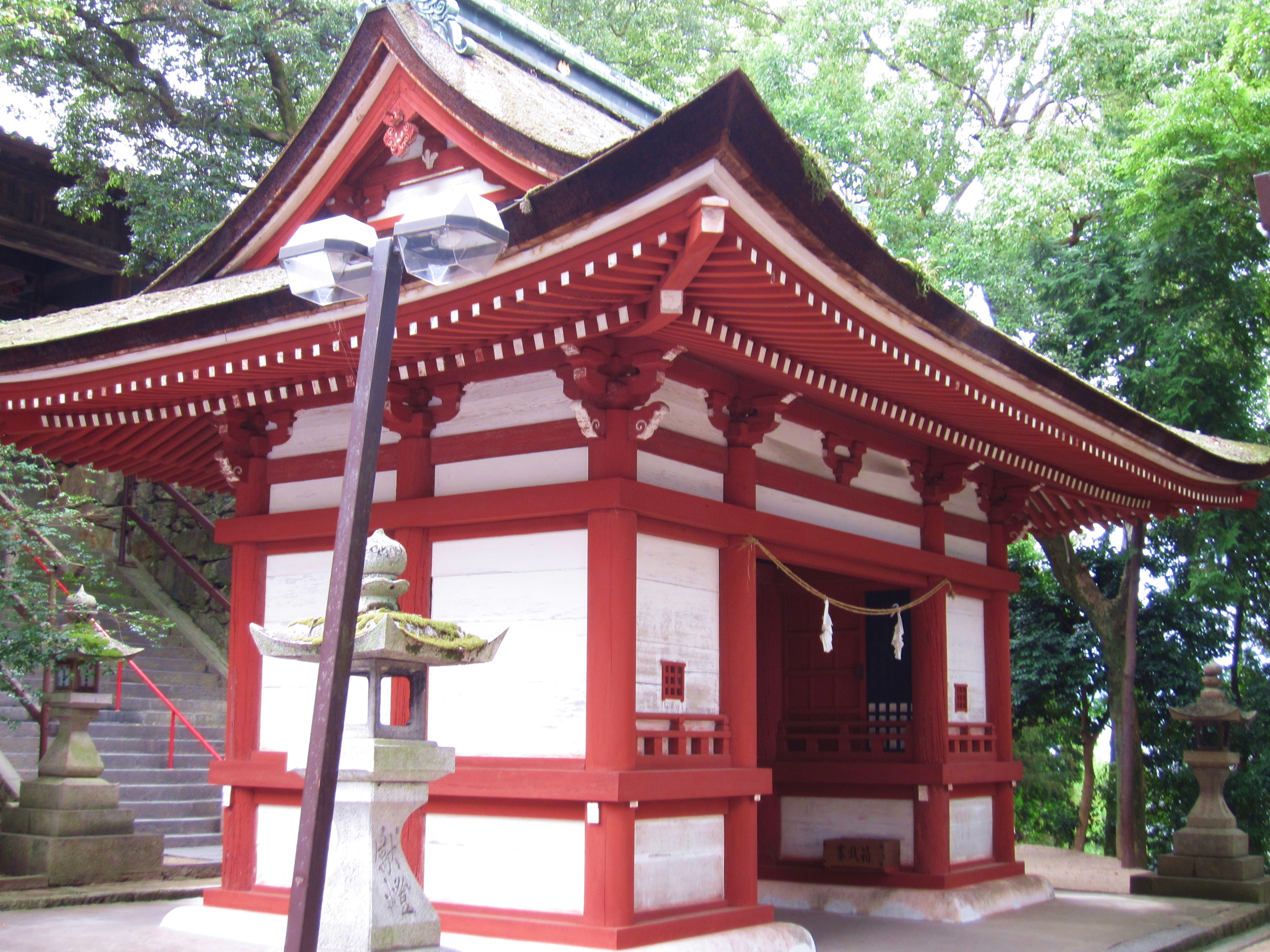
North Zuijinmon（ICP）

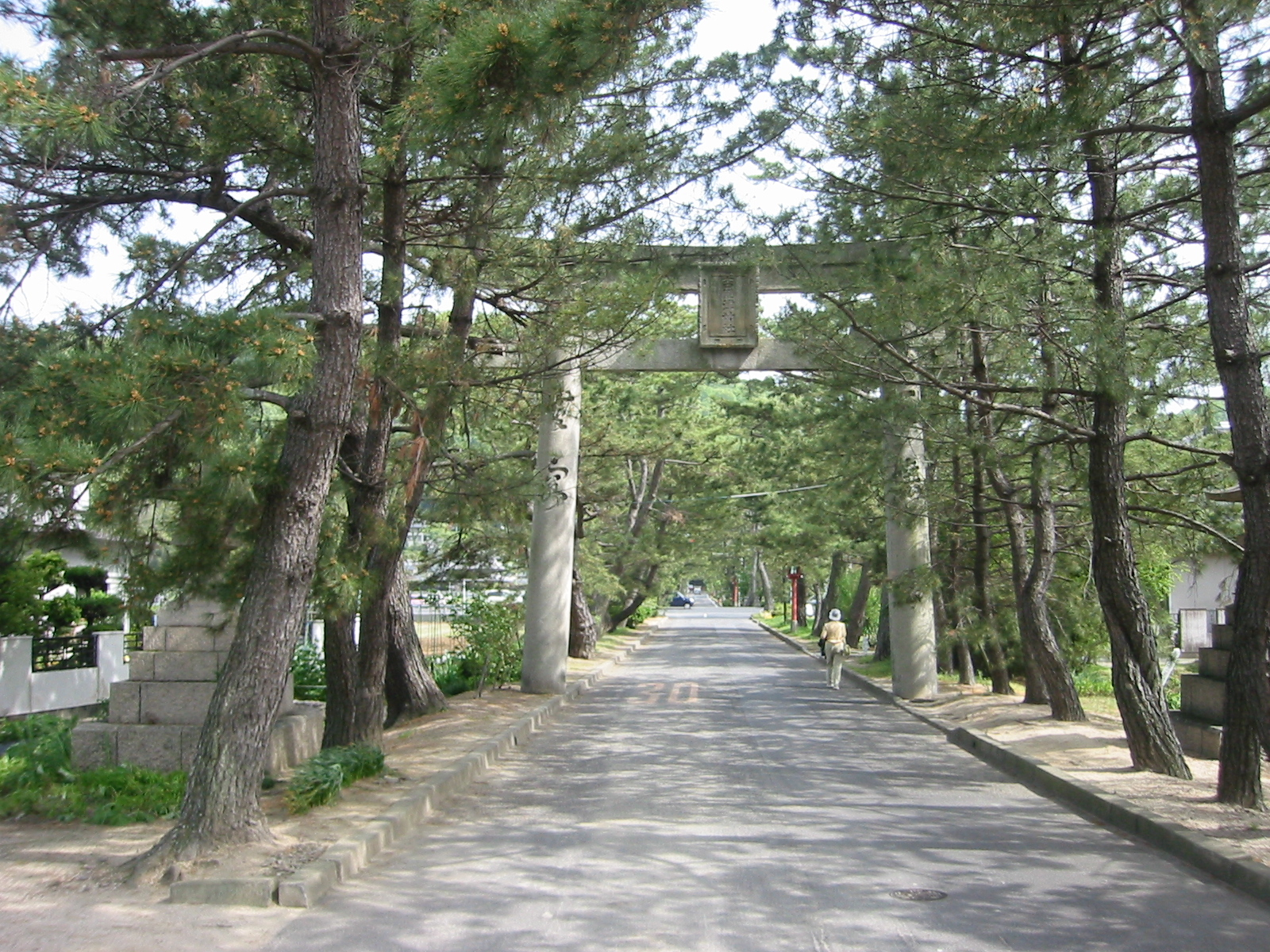
Approach and Ni-no-Torii

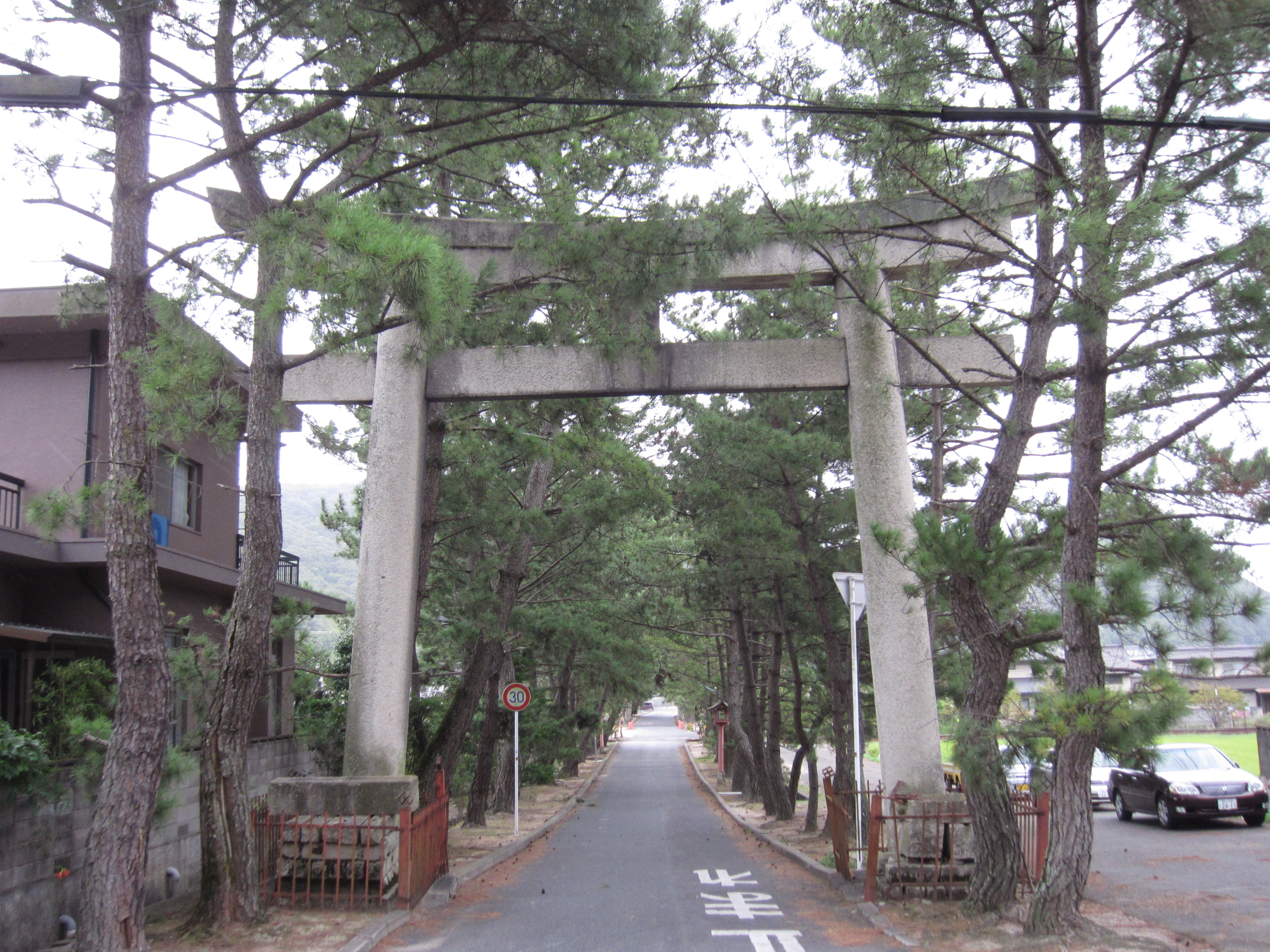
Ichi-no-Torii

== See also ==
- List of National Treasures of Japan (shrines)
- Ichinomiya
- Hokekyō-ji (Ichikawa)
- Kibitsuhiko Shrine
