= Bizen-Ichinomiya Station =

Railway station in Okayama, Japan

Bizen-Ichinomiya Station 備前一宮駅
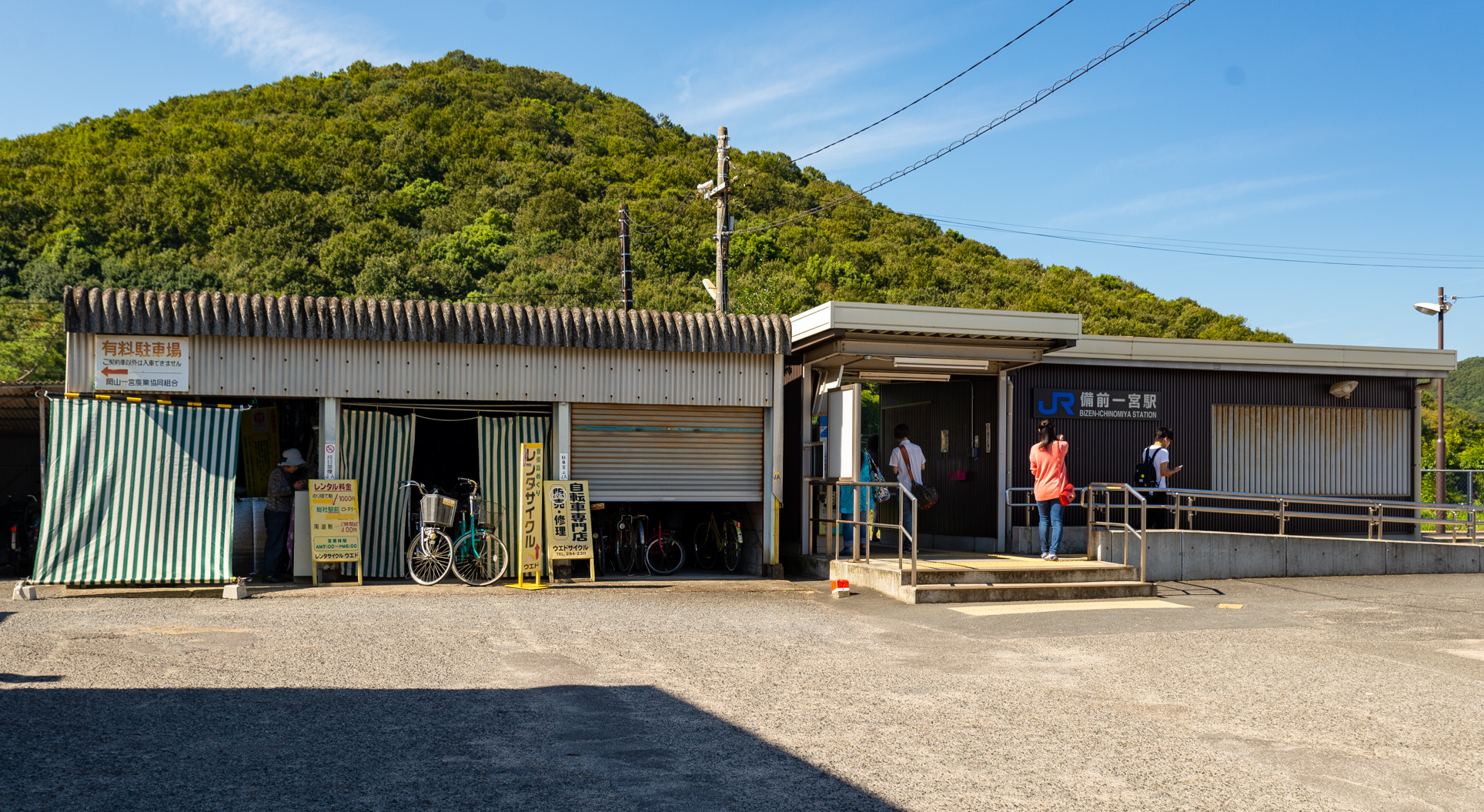
- Bizen-Ichinomiya Station, September 2015

General information
- Location: 553-19 Ichinomiya, Kita-ku, Okayama-shi, Okayama-ken 701-1211; Japan
- Coordinates: 34°40′50.82″N 133°51′50.89″E
- Owner: West Japan Railway Company
- Operator: West Japan Railway Company
- Line: U Kibi Line
- Distance: 6.5 km (4.0 miles) from Okayama
- Platforms: 1 side platform
- Connections: Bus stop

Other information
- Status: Unstaffed
- Station code: JR-U04
- Website: Official website

History
- Opened: 15 November 1904
- Former names: Ichinomiya (to 1916)

Passengers
- FY2019: 1026 daily

Services
Preceding station	JR West	Following station
Kibitsu towards Sōja	Kibi Line Local	Daianji towards Okayama
Location
- Location within Okayama Prefecture Location within Japan

Bizen-Ichinomiya Station (備前一宮駅, Bizen-Ichinomiya-eki) is a passenger railway station located in Kita-ku of the city of Okayama, Okayama Prefecture, Japan. It is operated by West Japan Railway Company (JR West).

== Lines ==
Bizen-Ichinomiya Station is served by the Kibi Line, and is located 6.5 kilometers from the southern terminus of the line at Okayama.

== Station layout ==
The station consists of one ground-level side platform serving a single bi-directional track. The first station building was demolished and a new station building was completed in 2008. The station is unattended. On the platform, there is a sarcophagus lid brought from the Iwafune Kofun in 'Kibi-Nakayama' on the south side of the station.

== History ==
Bizen-Ichinomiya Station opened on November 15, 1904 with the opening of the Kibi Line as Ichinomiya Station (一宮駅). It was renamed February 1, 1916. With the privatization of the Japan National Railways (JNR) on April 1, 1987, the station came under the aegis of the West Japan Railway Company.

== Passenger statistics ==
In fiscal 2019, the station was used by an average of 1026 passengers daily.

== Nearby attractions ==
- Kibitsuhiko Shrine
- Kurozumikyō headquarters

== See also ==
- List of railway stations in Japan
