= Kibitsu Shrine =

Kibitsu jinja may refer to:

- Kibitsu Shrine (Bingo), the chief Shinto shrine of Bingo Province
- Kibitsu Shrine (Bitchū), the chief Shinto shrine of Bitchū Province
