= Ashimori Station =

Railway station in Okayama, Japan

Ashimori Station 足守駅
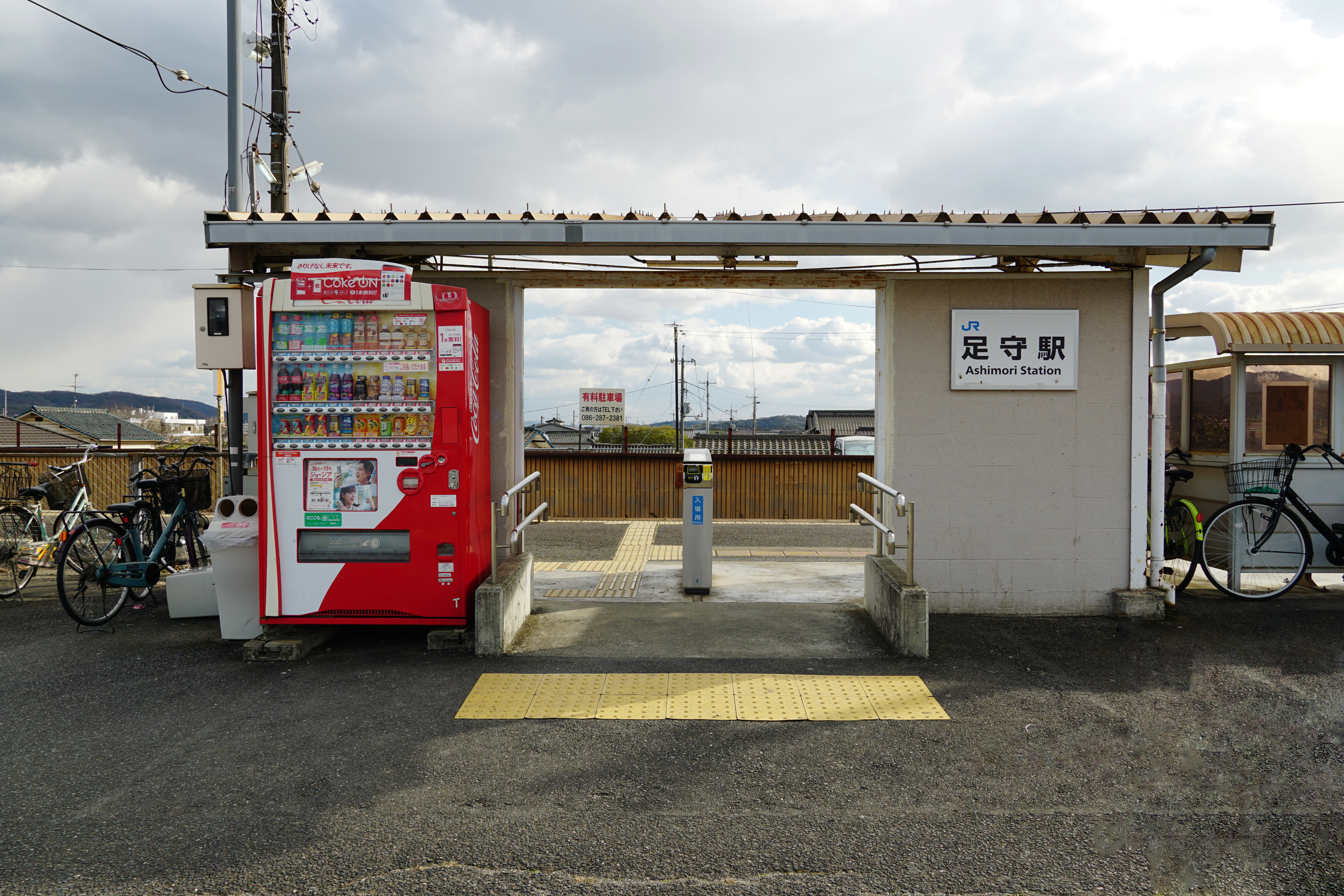
- Ashimori Station, December 2021

General information
- Location: Fukuzaki, Kita-ku, Okayama-shi, Okayama-ken 701-1357; Japan
- Coordinates: 34°41′53.53″N 133°48′10.54″E
- Owner: West Japan Railway Company
- Operator: West Japan Railway Company
- Line: U Kibi Line
- Distance: 13.4 km (8.3 miles) from Okayama
- Platforms: 1 side platform
- Connections: Bus stop

Other information
- Status: Unstaffed
- Station code: JR-U07
- Website: Official website

History
- Opened: 15 November 1904; 121 years ago

Passengers
- FY2019: 636 daily

Services
Preceding station	JR West	Following station
Hattori towards Sōja	Kibi Line Local	Bitchū-Takamatsu towards Okayama
Location
- Location within Okayama Prefecture Location within Japan

Ashimori Station (足守駅, Ashimori-eki) is a passenger railway station located in Kita-ku of the city of Okayama, Okayama Prefecture, Japan. It is operated by West Japan Railway Company (JR West).

== Lines ==
Ashimori Station is served by the Kibi Line, and is located 13.4 kilometers from the southern terminus of the line at Okayama.

== Station layout ==
The station consists of one ground-level side platform serving single bi-directional track. There is no station building, and the station is unattended.

== History ==
Ashimori Station opened on November 15, 1904 with the opening of the Tsuyama Line. With the privatization of the Japan National Railways (JNR) on April 1, 1987, the station came under the aegis of the West Japan Railway Company. The station building was rebuilt in February 2020.

== Passenger statistics ==
In fiscal 2019, the station was used by an average of 636 passengers daily.

== Surrounding area ==
- Ashimori River
- Japan National Route 180
- Japan National Route 429

== See also ==
- List of railway stations in Japan
