= Buddhism and abortion =

Aspect of Buddhism

There is no single Buddhist view concerning abortion, although it is generally regarded negatively. Classical Buddhist texts commonly regard intentional taking of life as ethically negative, and many traditional interpretations consider life to begin at conception. At the same time, Buddhist moral reasoning places strong emphasis on intention, circumstance, and compassion, rather than absolute moral rules. As a result, Buddhist responses to abortion often involve balancing respect for life with concern for suffering, health, and social realities.

== Scriptural views and the monastic code ==
Inducing or otherwise causing an abortion is regarded as a serious matter in the monastic rules followed by both Theravada and Mahayana monks; monks can be expelled for assisting a woman in procuring an abortion. Traditional sources do not recognize a distinction between early- and late-term abortion, but in Sri Lanka and Thailand the "moral stigma" associated with an abortion grows with the development of the fetus. While traditional sources do not seem to be aware of the possibility of abortion as relevant to the health of the mother, modern Buddhist teachers from many traditions – and abortion laws in many Buddhist countries – recognize a threat to the life or physical health of the mother as an acceptable justification for abortion as a practical matter, though it may still be seen as a deed with negative moral or karmic consequences.

== Regional views ==
Views on abortion vary a great deal between different regions, reflecting the influence of the various Buddhist traditions, as well as the influence of other religious and philosophical traditions and contact with Western thought.

=== Northern Buddhism ===
Abortion is generally regarded extremely negatively among ethnic Tibetan Buddhists. Prior to the emergence of the Tibetan diaspora in the 1950s, Tibetans do not seem to have been familiar with abortion for reasons of medical necessity, and, facing little population pressure, saw little reason to engage in what they saw as the destruction of innocent life. Though no systematic information is available, abortion appears to be very rare among exiled Tibetans living in areas where abortion is legal. Tibetan Buddhists believe that a person who has had an abortion should be treated compassionately, and guided to atone for the negative act through appropriate good deeds and religious practices; these acts are aimed at improving the karmic outcome for both the mother and the aborted fetus, but authorities warn that they will not be effective if one has undertaken an abortion while planning to 'negate' it by atoning for it later. The Dalai Lama has said that abortion is "negative," but there are exceptions. He said, "I think abortion should be approved or disapproved according to each circumstance."

=== Southern Buddhism ===
Laws and views on abortion vary greatly in Theravada Buddhist nations. Attitudes and laws in Thailand are generally more favourable towards abortion than in Sri Lanka. While abortion is still viewed as negative in Burma (Myanmar), it is allegedly also employed with some frequency to prevent out-of-wedlock births. Regarding attitudes towards abortion in Thailand, Peter Harvey notes:

...abortion is discussed not in the language of rights – to life or choice – but of 'benefit and harm, with the intent of relieving as much human suffering in all its states, stages and situations as circumstances allow', with an emphasis on reducing the circumstances leading women to feel that they need to have an abortion.

In November 2010, the issue of abortion and Buddhism in Thailand was thrust onto the front pages after 2000 fetuses were discovered stored at a temple in Bangkok. At this time, abortion was illegal in the country except in cases of rape or risk to the woman's health. Following the scandal, leading politicians and monks spoke out to reaffirm their opposition to abortion laws. Phramaha Vudhijaya Vajiramedhi was unequivocal: "In [the] Buddhist view, both having an abortion and performing an abortion amount to murder. Those involved in abortions will face distress in both this life and the next because their sins will follow them." Prime Minister Abhisit announced a crackdown on illegal abortion clinics and refused calls to change the law, saying that current laws were "good enough." However, in October 2022, Thailand's Public Health Ministry legalized abortions up to the 20th week of pregnancy – an extension of a previous law which allowed termination of pregnancy within the first 12 weeks. Pro-choice advocates in Thailand and around the world celebrated the new rules as a positive development but noted that more needed to be done to ensure doctors were trained and the public was made aware of their rights to an abortion. Experts note that Thailand's move to expand abortion access comes amid a wave of global expansion of abortion rights in recent years.

Peter Harvey relates attitudes towards abortion in Burma to Melford Spiro's observation that Buddhists in Myanmar recognize a clear distinction between what may be regarded as 'ultimate good' in a religious sense and what is a 'worldly good' or utilitarian act. Despite the prevalence of illegal abortions in Myanmar due to economic difficulty, many Buddhists consider it against their religious beliefs. A 1995 survey on women in Myanmar showed that 99% thought abortion was against their religious beliefs.

=== East Asia ===
Buddhists in Japan are said to be more tolerant of abortion than those who live elsewhere. In Japan, women sometimes participate in the Shinto-Buddhist ritual of mizuko kuyō (水子供養, lit. 'fetus memorial service') after an induced abortion or an abortion as the result of a miscarriage.

Similarly, in Taiwan, women sometimes pray to appease ghosts of aborted fetuses and assuage feelings of guilt due to having an abortion; this type of ritual is called yingling gongyang. The modern practice emerged in the mid-1970s and grew significantly in popularity in the 1980s, particularly following the full legalization of abortion in 1985. It draws both from traditional antecedents dating back to the Han dynasty, and the Japanese practice. These modern practices emerged in the context of demographic change associated with modernization – rising population, urbanization, and decreasing family size – together with changing attitudes towards sexuality, which occurred first in Japan, and then in Taiwan, hence the similar response and Taiwan's taking inspiration from Japan.

== See also ==
- Buddhist Ethics
- Five Precepts
- Noble Eightfold Path
