= Kibitsu Station =

Railway station in Okayama, Japan

Kibitsu Station 吉備津駅
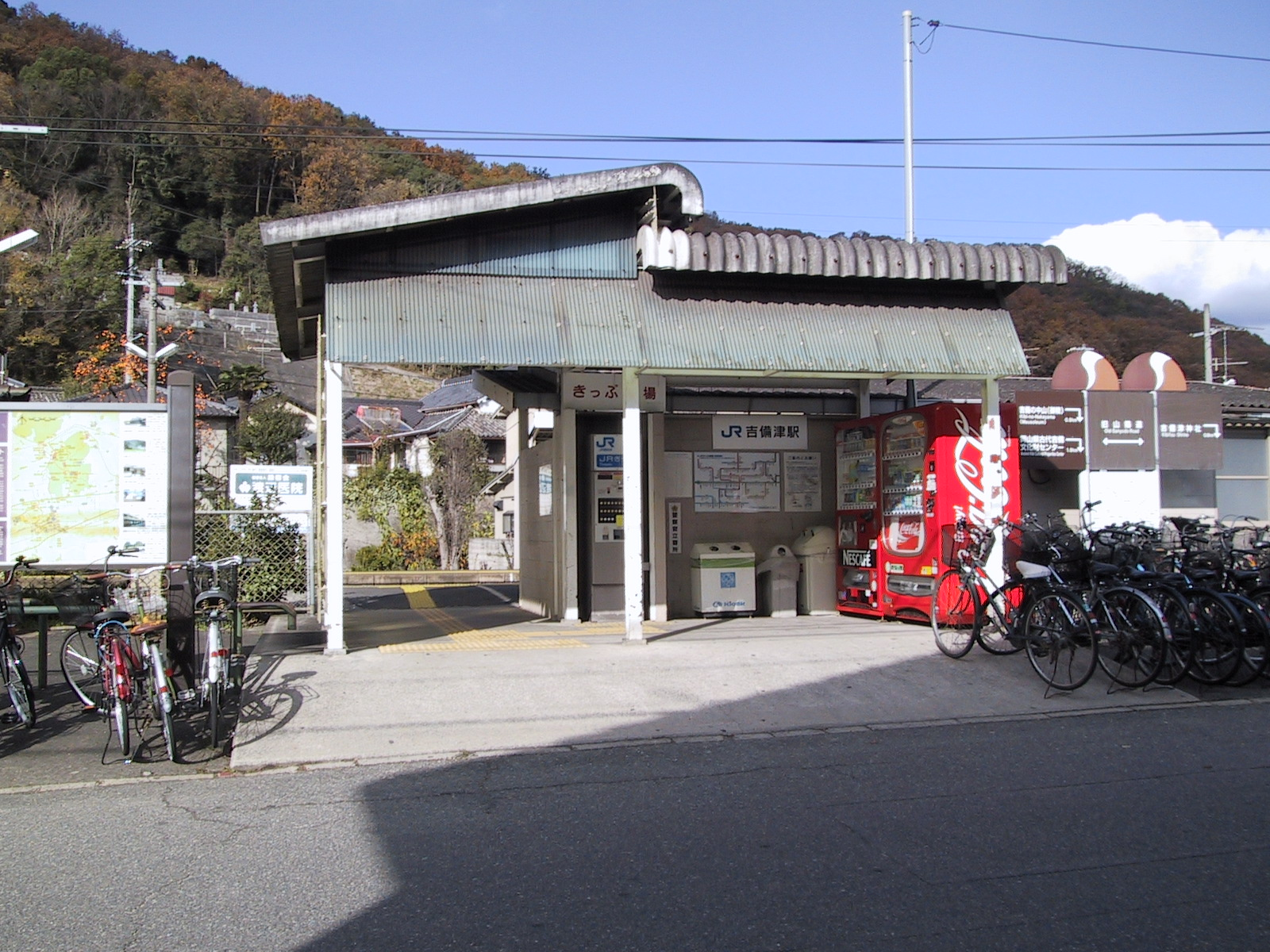
- Kibitsu Station, November 2006

General information
- Location: 1054-2 Kibitsu, Kita-ku, Okayama-shi, Okayama-ken 701-1341; Japan
- Coordinates: 34°40′27.63″N 133°50′45.72″E
- Owner: West Japan Railway Company
- Operator: West Japan Railway Company
- Line: U Kibi Line
- Distance: 8.4 km (5.2 miles) from Okayama
- Platforms: 2 side platforms
- Connections: Bus stop

Other information
- Status: Unstaffed
- Station code: JR-U05
- Website: Official website

History
- Opened: 15 November 1904
- Former names: Inari (to 1931)

Passengers
- FY2019: 1297 daily

Services
Preceding station	JR West	Following station
Bitchū-Takamatsu towards Sōja	Kibi Line Local	Bizen-Ichinomiya towards Okayama
Location
- Location within Okayama Prefecture Location within Japan

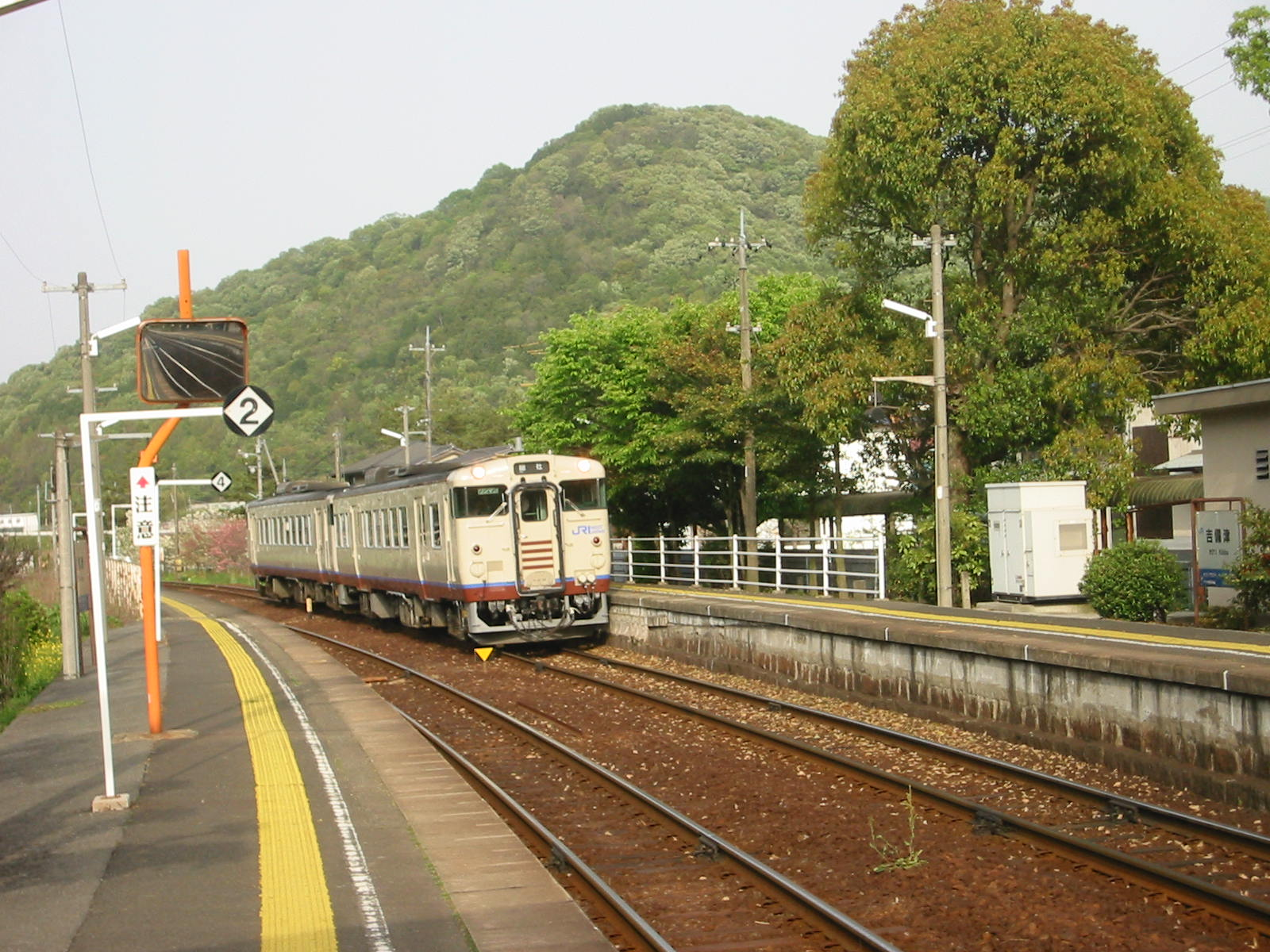
Station platform during 2006

Kibitsu Station (吉備津駅, Kibitsu-eki) is a passenger railway station located in Kita-ku of the city of Okayama, Okayama Prefecture, Japan. It is operated by West Japan Railway Company (JR West).

== Lines ==
Kibitsu Station is served by the Kibi Line, and is located 8.4 kilometers from the southern terminus of the line at Okayama.

== Station layout ==
The station consists of two ground-level opposed side platforms, connected by a level crossing. The station is unattended.

=== Platforms ===
1	■ U Kibi Line	for Okayama
2	■ U Kibi Line	for Bitchū-Takamatsu and Sōja

== History ==
Kibitsu Station opened on November 15, 1904 with the opening of the Kibi Line. With the privatization of the Japan National Railways (JNR) on April 1, 1987, the station came under the aegis of the West Japan Railway Company.

== Passenger statistics ==
In fiscal 2019, the station was used by an average of 605 passengers daily.

== Surrounding area ==
- Kibitsu Shrine
- Magane Ichirizuka
- Okayama City Koiyama Elementary School
- Kurozumikyō headquarters

== See also ==
- List of railway stations in Japan
