= Mizuko kuyō =

Japanese ceremony for those who have had a miscarriage, stillbirth, or abortion

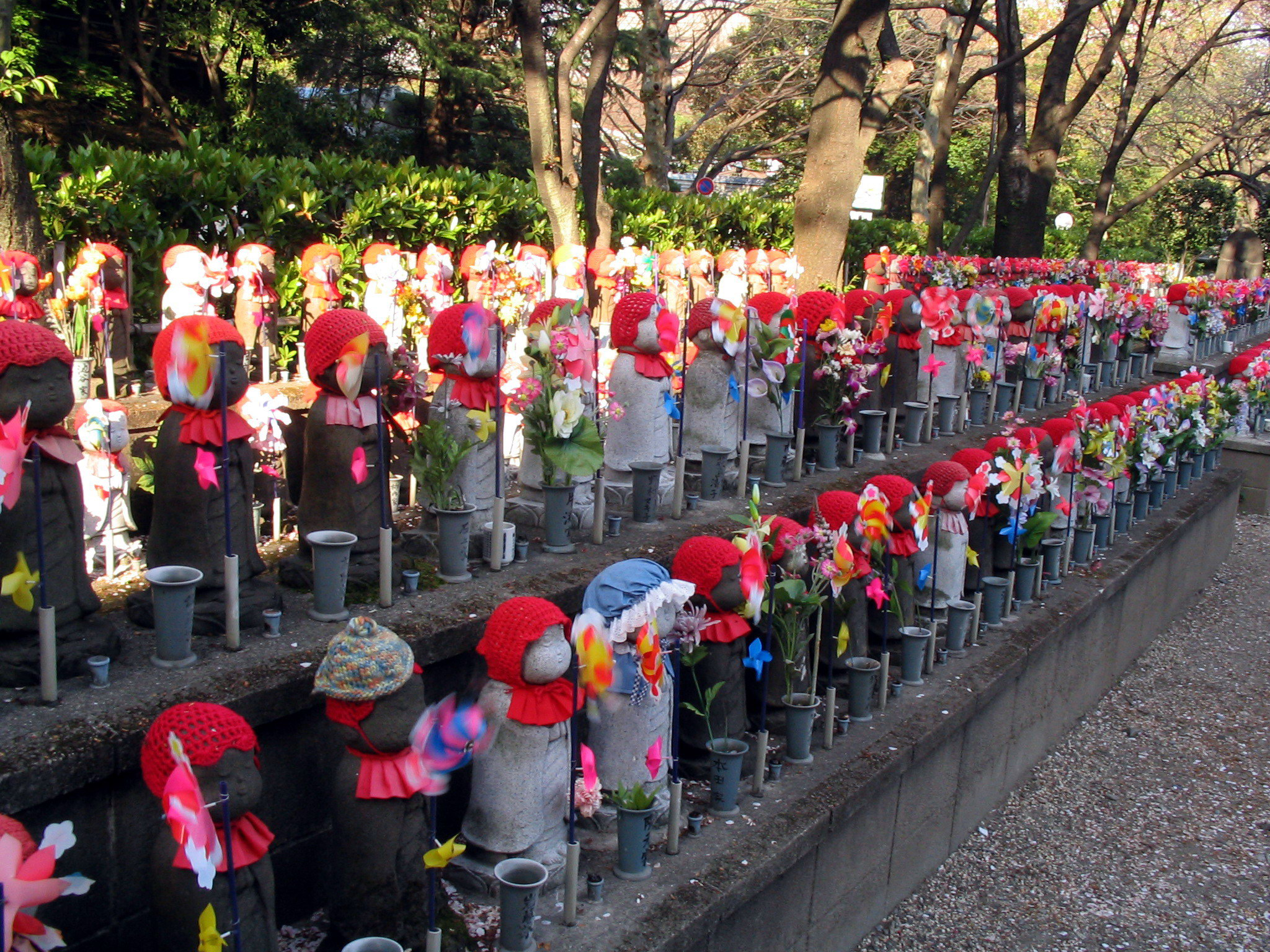
Jizō statues at Zōjō-ji in Tokyo

Mizuko kuyō (水子供養) meaning "water child memorial service", is a Japanese Buddhist ceremony for those who have had a miscarriage, stillbirth, or abortion. It is also practiced in Thailand and China. This practice has become particularly visible since the 1970s with the creation of shrines devoted solely to this ritual. Reasons for the performance of these rites can include parental grief, desire to comfort the soul of the fetus, guilt for an abortion, or even fear of retribution from a vengeful ghost.

== Mizuko ==
Mizuko (水子), literally "water child", is a Japanese term for an aborted, stillborn or miscarried baby, and archaically for a dead baby or infant. Kuyō (供養) refers to a memorial service. Previously read suiji, the Sino-Japanese on'yomi reading of the same characters, the term was originally a kaimyō or dharma name given after death. The mizuko kuyō, typically performed by Buddhist priests, was used to make offerings to Jizō, a bodhisattva who is believed to protect children. In the Edo period, when famine sometimes led the poverty-stricken to infanticide and abortion, the practice was adapted to cover these situations as well.

Today, the practice of mizuko kuyō continues in Japan, although it is unclear whether it is a historically authentic Buddhist practice. Specific elements of the ceremony vary from temple to temple, school to school, and individual to individual. It is common for temples to offer Jizō statues for a fee, which are then dressed in red bibs and caps, and displayed in the temple yard. Though the practice has been performed since the 1970s, there are still doubts surrounding the ritual. Some view the memorial service as the temples' way of benefiting from the misfortune of women who have miscarried or had to abort a pregnancy. American religious scholars have criticized the temples for allegedly abusing the Japanese belief that the spirits of the dead retaliate for their mistreatment, but other scholars believe the temples are only answering the needs of the people.

The ceremony is attended by both parents or by one, not necessarily the mother. The service can vary from a single event to one that repeats monthly or annually. Though the service varies, common aspects resemble the ceremony for the recent dead, the senzo kuyō (先祖供養). The priest faces the altar and evokes the names of various Buddhas and bodhisattvas. Mantras, often the Heart Sutra and the 25th chapter of the Lotus Sutra, known as the "Avalokiteśvara Sutra", are performed, as are calls of praise to Jizō. Gifts are offered to the Buddha on behalf of the mourned, typically food, drink, incense or flowers. A kaimyō is given to the deceased, and a statue of Jizō is often placed on temple grounds upon completion of the ceremony.

== Similar practices ==
A similar practice is found in contemporary Taiwan, where it is known as yingling gongyang. The modern Taiwanese practice emerged in the mid-1970s and grew significantly in popularity in the 1980s; it draws both from traditional antecedents dating back to the Han dynasty, and the Japanese practice, and is popularly perceived as a practice imported from Japan. These modern practices emerged in the context of demographic change associated with modernization – rising population, urbanization, and decreasing family size – together with changing attitudes towards sexuality, which occurred first in Japan, and then in Taiwan, hence the similar response and Taiwan's taking inspiration from Japan.

== See also ==
- Abortion in Japan
- Buddhist Ethics
- Five Precepts
- Noble Eightfold Path
- Perinatal bereavement
- Reproductive loss
