= Kibi Line =

Railway line in Okayama Prefecture, Japan

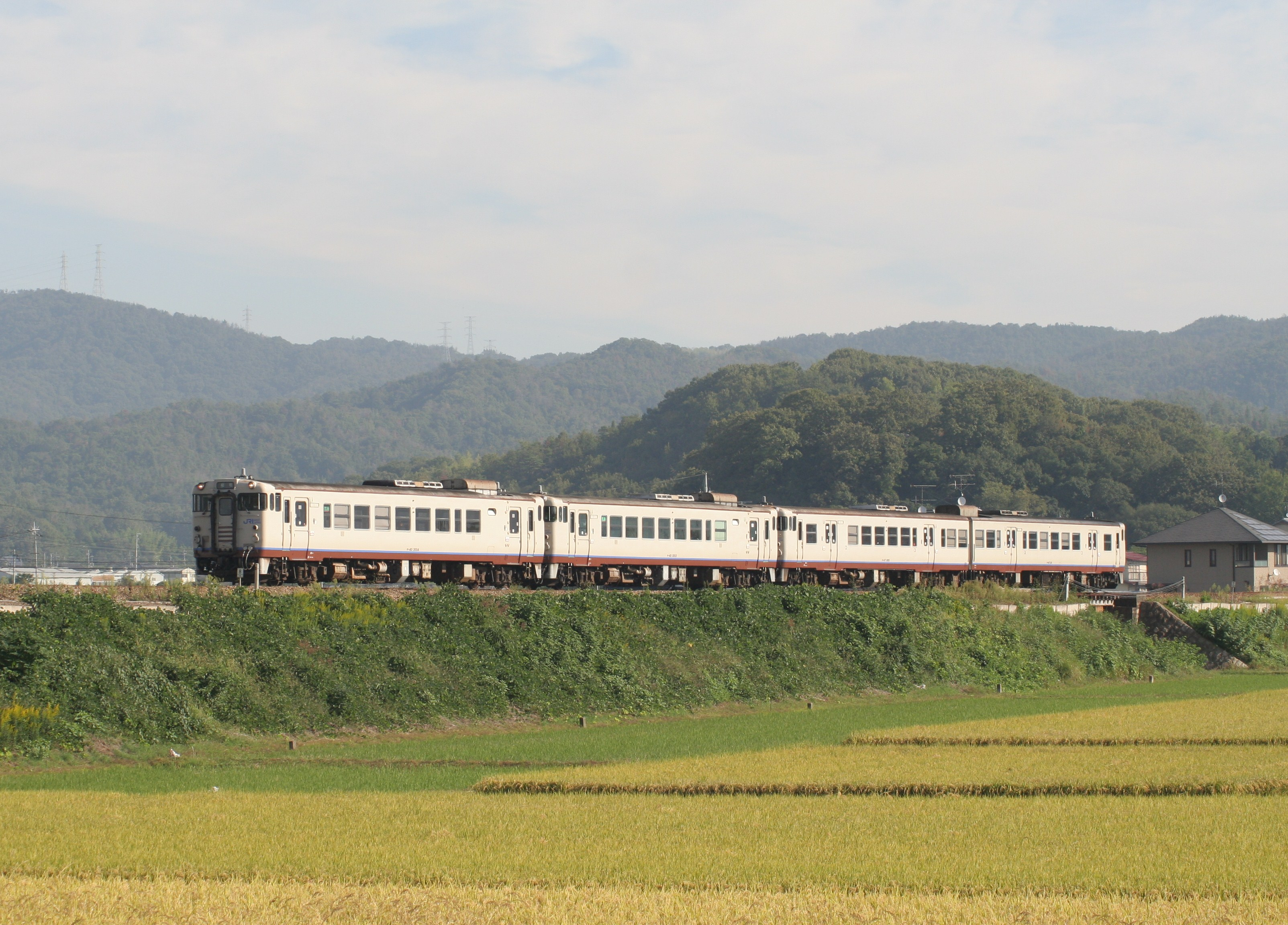
- KiHa 40 series and KiHa 47 series DMUs on the Kibi Line between Ashimori and Hattori in October 2010

Overview
- Other name: Momotaro Line
- Native name: 吉備線
- Status: In operation
- Owner: JR West
- Locale: Okayama Prefecture
- Termini: Okayama; Sōja
- Stations: 10

Service
- Type: Heavy rail
- Operator: JR West
- Rolling stock: KiHa 40 series DMU; KiHa 47 DMU

History
- Opened: 11 November 1904; 121 years ago

Technical
- Line length: 20.4 km (12.7 mi)
- Number of tracks: Entirely Single-track
- Character: Urban and rural
- Track gauge: 1,067 mm (3 ft 6 in)
- Electrification: None
- Operating speed: 85 km/h (53 mph)

Kibi Line (吉備線, Kibi-sen) is a railway line in Okayama Prefecture, Japan, operated by the West Japan Railway Company (JR West). The nickname used by JR West in maps and timetables is the Momotaro Line (桃太郎線).

== Stations ==
All stations are in Okayama Prefecture.

No.	Name	Japanese	Distance (km)	Connections	Location
U01	Okayama	岡山	0.0	Sanyo Shinkansen; Sanyo Main Line; Akō Line; Hakubi Line; Uno Line ( Seto-Ōhashi Line); Tsuyama Line; Okayama Electric Tramway Higashiyama Line/Seikibashi Line	Kita-ku, Okayama
U02	Bizen-Mikado	備前三門	1.9		Kita-ku, Okayama
U03	Daianji	大安寺	3.3		Kita-ku, Okayama
U04	Bizen-Ichinomiya	備前一宮	6.5		Kita-ku, Okayama
U05	Kibitsu	吉備津	8.4		Kita-ku, Okayama
U06	Bitchū-Takamatsu	備中高松	11.0		Kita-ku, Okayama
U07	Ashimori	足守	13.4		Kita-ku, Okayama
U08	Hattori	服部	16.2		Sōja
U09	Higashi-Sōja	東総社	18.8		Sōja
U10	Sōja	総社	20.4	Hakubi Line; ■ Ibara Railway Ibara Line	Sōja

== Rolling stock ==
- KiHa 40 series diesel multiple units
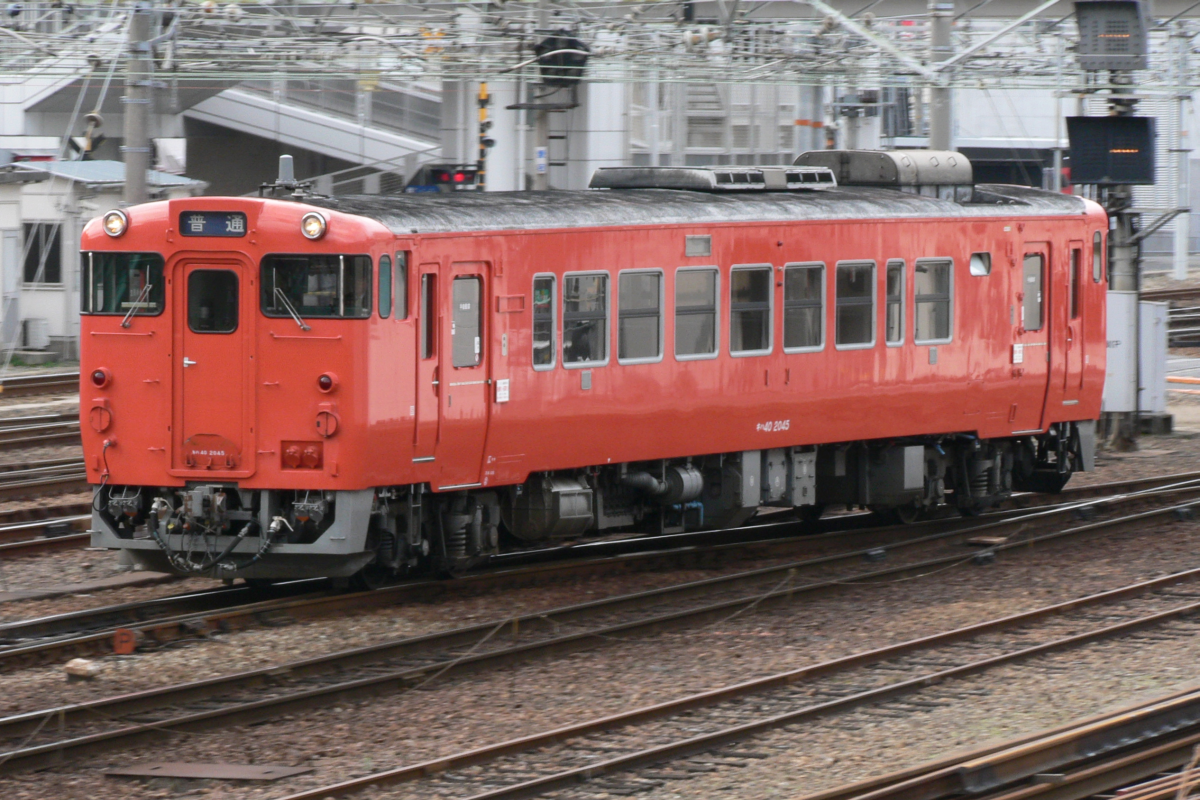

== History ==
The line opened in 1904. The line is named after the historical Kibi Province ("Kibi Province" (吉備国)).

On 1 June 1944, the Chugoku Railway was nationalized, becoming part of Japanese National Railways (JNR). With the privatization of JNR on 1 April 1987, the line came under the control of JR West.

From the start of the 26 March 2016 timetable revision, the line was branded the "Momotaro Line" (桃太郎線). Leading on from this is the linguistic / phonetic coincidence that "kibi dango" (millet dumplings) is a famous dish associated with the Momotaro legend despite neither the character, nor millet in general, nor millet dumplings specifically have any particular historical connection to Okayama. The coincidence has been commented on for centuries.

== See also ==
- List of railway lines in Japan
