= Bitchū-Takamatsu Station =

Railway station in Okayama, Japan

Bitchū-Takamatsu Station 備中高松駅
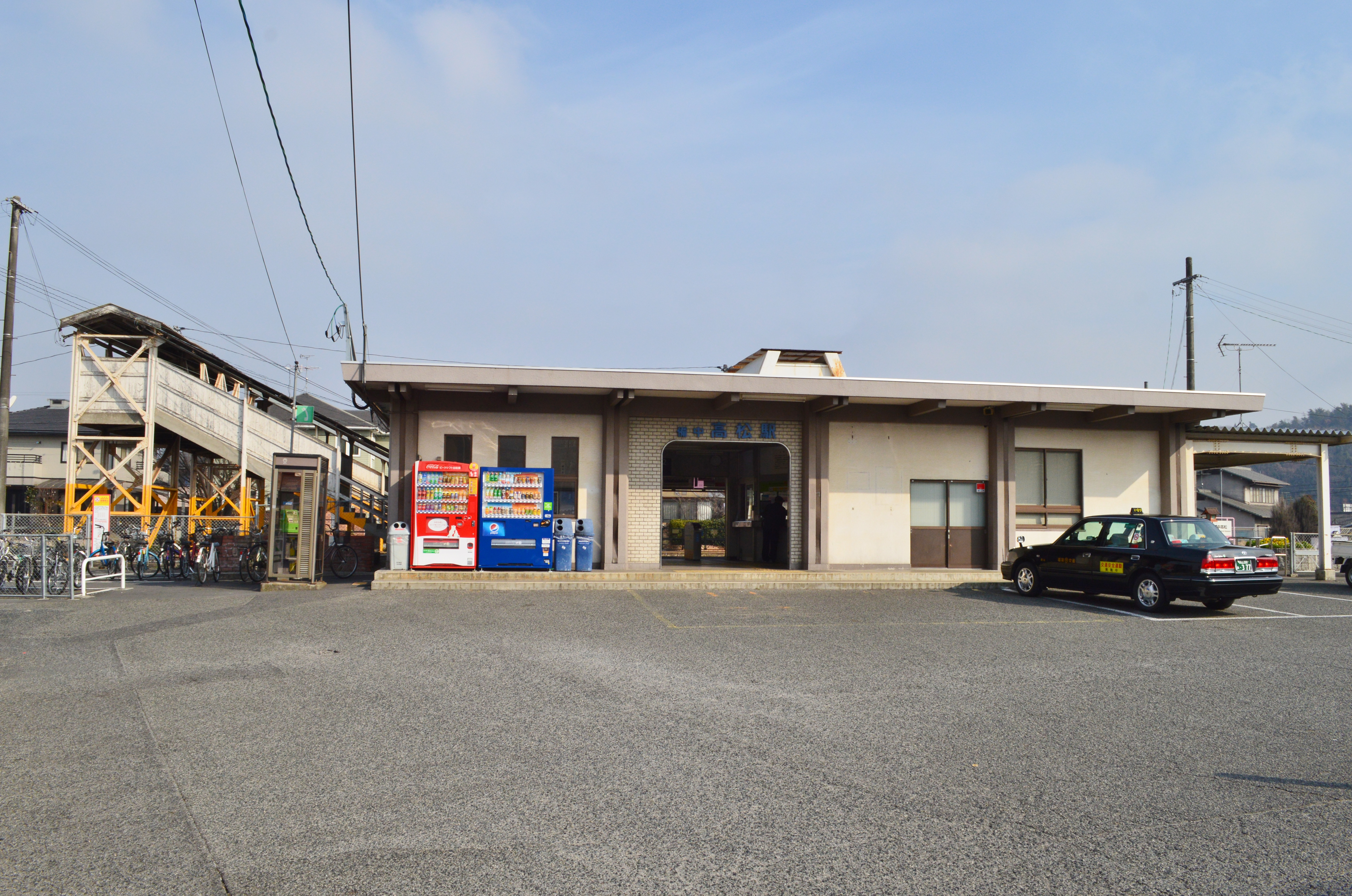
- Bitchū-Takamatsu Station, December 2012

General information
- Location: 136 Takamatsu, Kita-ku, Okayama-shi, Okayama-ken 701-1357; Japan
- Coordinates: 34°41′11.11″N 133°49′20.09″E
- Owner: West Japan Railway Company
- Operator: West Japan Railway Company
- Line: U Kibi Line
- Distance: 11.0 km (6.8 miles) from Okayama
- Platforms: 2 side platforms
- Connections: Bus stop

Other information
- Status: Unstaffed
- Station code: JR-U06
- Website: Official website

History
- Opened: 15 November 1904
- Former names: Inari (to 1931)

Passengers
- FY2019: 1297 daily

Services
Preceding station	JR West	Following station
Ashimori towards Sōja	Kibi Line Local	Kibitsu towards Okayama
Location
- Location within Okayama Prefecture Location within Japan

Bitchū-Takamatsu Station (備中高松駅, Bitchū-Takamatsu-eki) is a passenger railway station located in Kita-ku of the city of Okayama, Okayama Prefecture, Japan. It is operated by West Japan Railway Company (JR West).

== Lines ==
Bitchū-Takamatsu Station is served by the Kibi Line, and is located 11.0 kilometers from the southern terminus of the line at Okayama.

== Station layout ==
The station consists of two ground-level opposed side platforms, connected by a footbridge. The concrete station building is adjacent to Platform 2. The station is unattended.

=== Platforms ===
1	■ U Kibi Line	for Okayama
2	■ U Kibi Line	for Sōja

== History ==
Bitchū-Takamatsu Station opened on November 15, 1904 with the opening of the Kibi Line as Inari Station (稲荷駅). It was renamed February 9, 1931. With the privatization of the Japan National Railways (JNR) on April 1, 1987, the station came under the aegis of the West Japan Railway Company.

== Passenger statistics ==
In fiscal 2019, the station was used by an average of 1297 passengers daily.

== See also ==
- List of railway stations in Japan
