= Haiden (Shinto) =

Hall of worship in a Shinto shrine

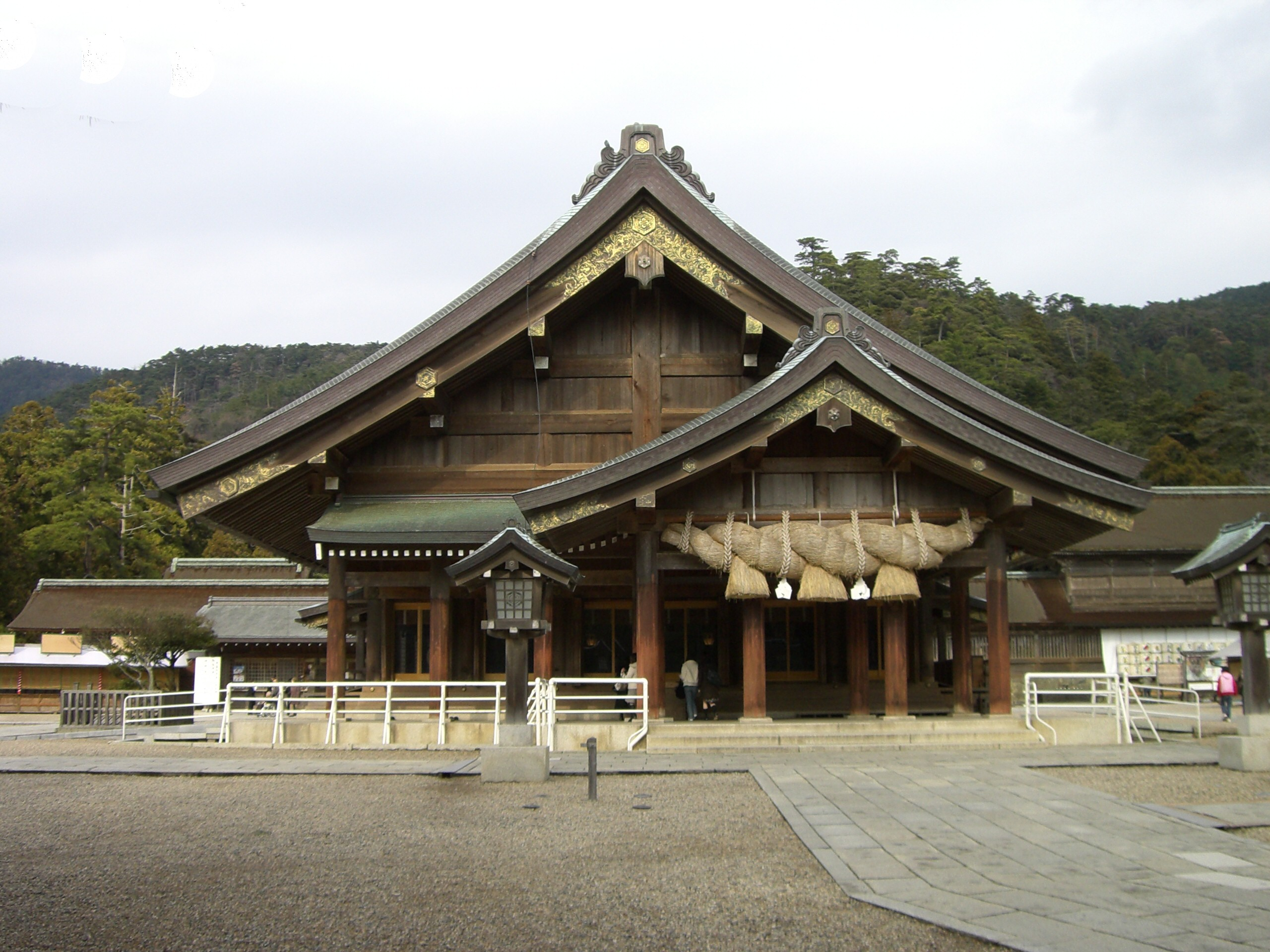
Izumo Taisha's haiden

In Shinto shrine architecture, the haiden (拝殿) is the hall of worship or oratory. It is generally placed in front of the shrine's main sanctuary (honden) and often built on a larger scale than the latter. The haiden is often connected to the honden by a heiden, or hall of offerings. While the honden is the place for the enshrined kami and off-limits to the general public, the haiden provides a space for ceremonies and for worshiping the kami. In some cases, for example at Nara's Ōmiwa Shrine, the honden can be missing and be replaced by a patch of sacred ground. In that case, the haiden is the most important building of the complex.
