= Kōmorizuka Kofun =

- こうもり塚古墳 (Japanese)
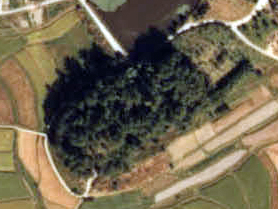
- Kōmorizuka Kofun

- Kōmorizuka Kofun Kōmorizuka Kofun (Japan)
- Interactive map of Kōmorizuka Kofun
- 34°40′3.35″N 133°47′11.79″E
- Type: Kofun
- Periods: Kofun period
- Location: Sōja, Okayama, Japan
- Region: San'yō region

History
- Built: mid 3rd century

Site notes
- Public access: Yes (no facilities)

Kōmorizuka Kofun (こうもり塚古墳) is a Kofun period burial mound, located in the Kanbayashi neighborhood of the city of Sōja, Okayama Prefecture, in the San'yō region of Japan. The tumulus was designated a National Historic Site of Japan in 1968. It was formerly known as the Kurohimezuka Kofun (黒姫塚古墳).

== Overview ==
The Kōmorizuka Kofun is located on a hill in-between the Bitchū Kokubun-ji temple ruins and the Bitchū Kokubun-niji nunnery ruins. It is a zenpō-kōen-fun (前方後円墳), which is shaped like a keyhole when viewed from above. It is estimated that the tumulus was about 100 meters long and had a posterior circular portion with a diameter of about 55 to 60 meters. The tumulus is constructed in two stages. Fukiishi and haniwa have not been confirmed. On the southern side of the posterior portion is a horizontal entry stone burial chamber constructed of megalithic blocks of granite. The burial chamber has a total length of about 19.4 meters, which is the third largest size among the confirmed corridor-style stone chambers in Japan. It contains a hollowed-out house-shaped sarcophagus measuring 2.38m long, 1.4m wide, and 1.31m high. The sarcophagus is made of shell limestone quarried at Mount Namigata in Ibara, Okayama.The 1978 archaeological excavation found fragments of a tortoise shell-shaped Haji ware coffin and iron nails, indicating that the stone sarcophagus contained both a pottery and a wooden coffin, possibly from multiple burials.

Although the tumulus had been robbed in antiquity, some grave goods were discovered, including pommels of iron swords with a phoenix design, iron arrowheads, horse trapping and ornaments, such as small glass beads and gold rings.

The tumulus is named "Komorizuka" from bats living in the open burial chamber. The name "Kurohimezuka" comes from a legend that this is the tomb of Kurohime, a beautiful woman from the Kingdom of Kibi who was favored by Emperor Nintoku. However, as the tumulus was built in the latter half of the 6th century, and the reign of Emperor Nintoku is said to be in the 4th century, the dates do not match the legend.

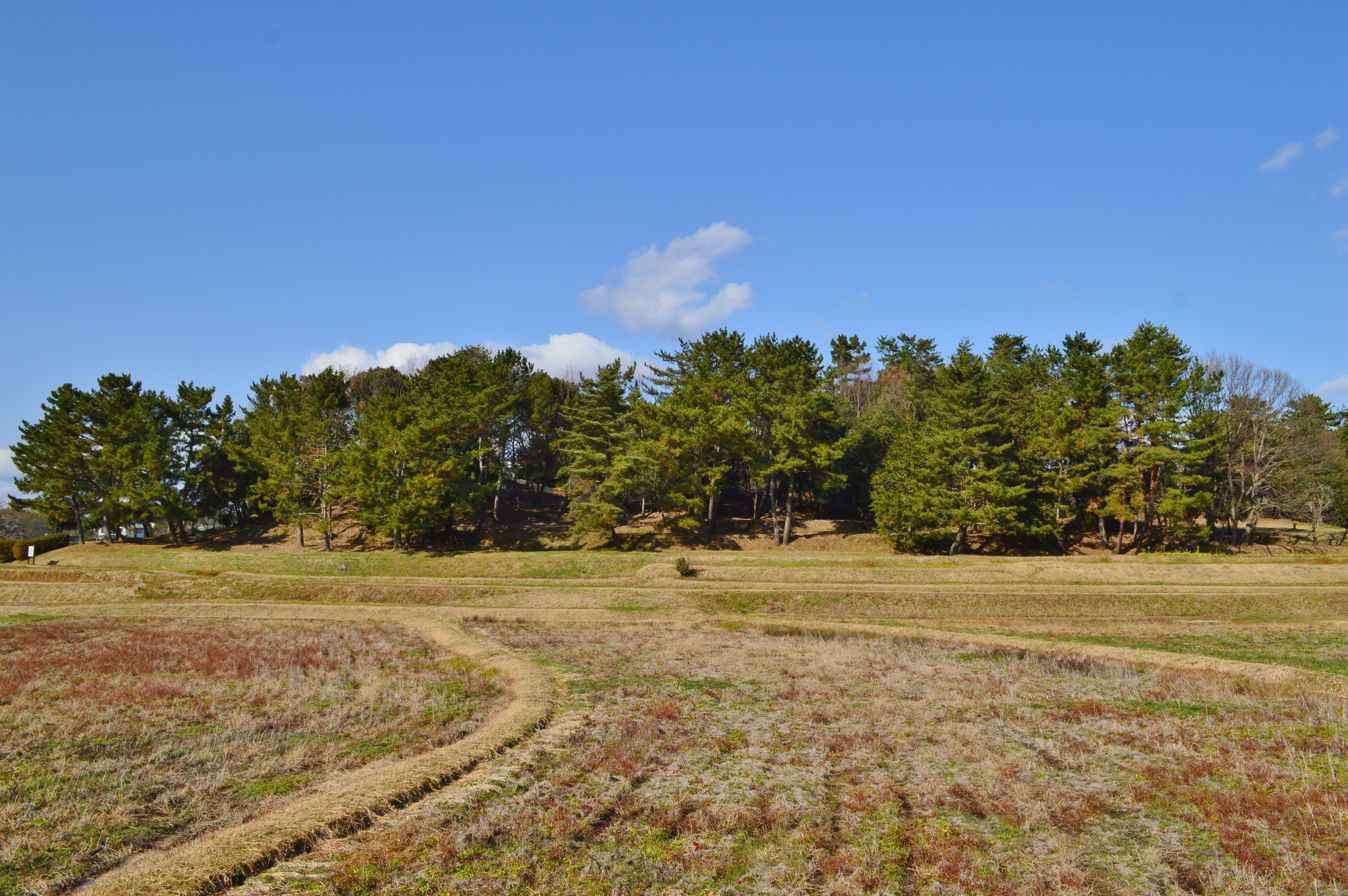
Panoramic view

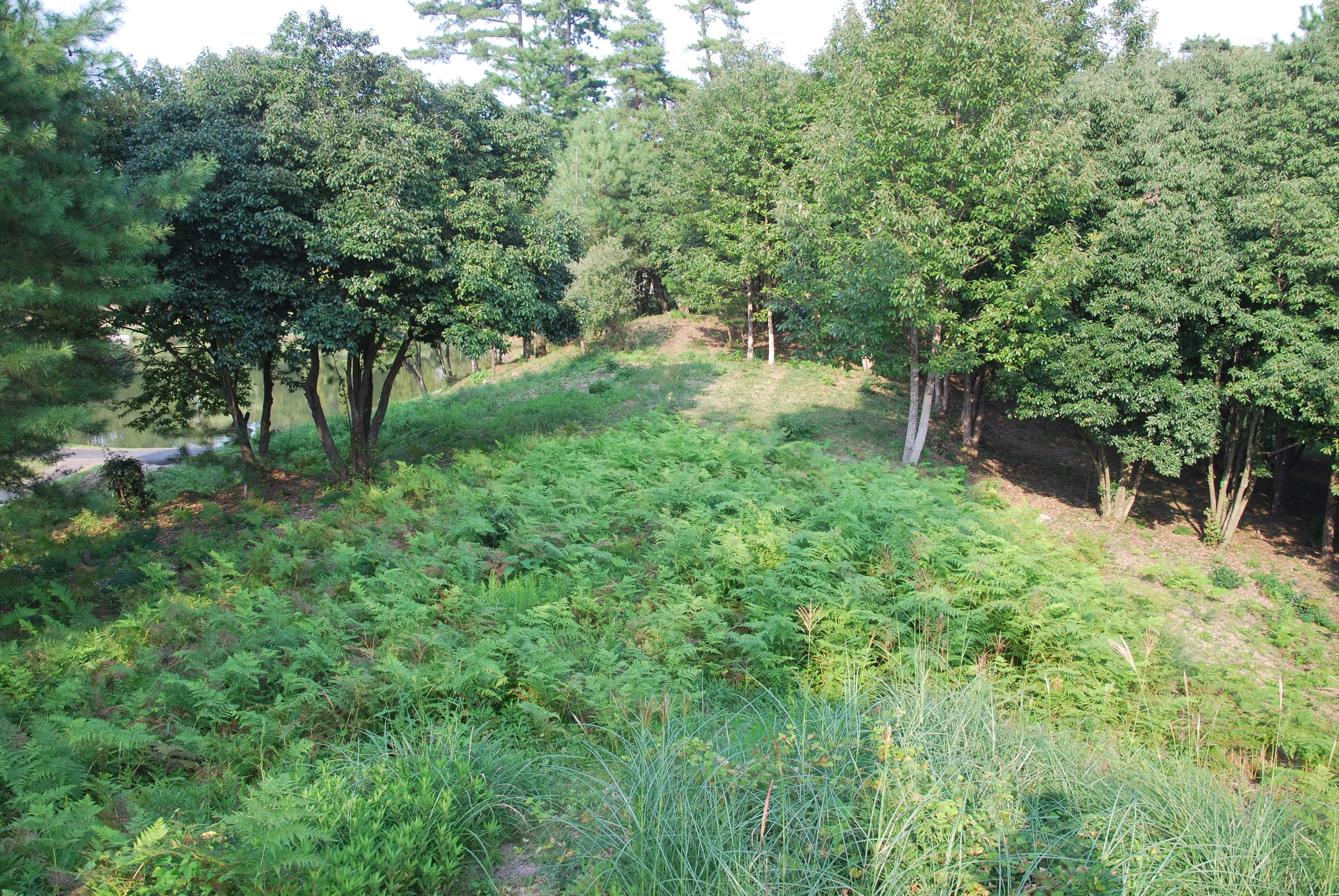
Anterior rectangular portion

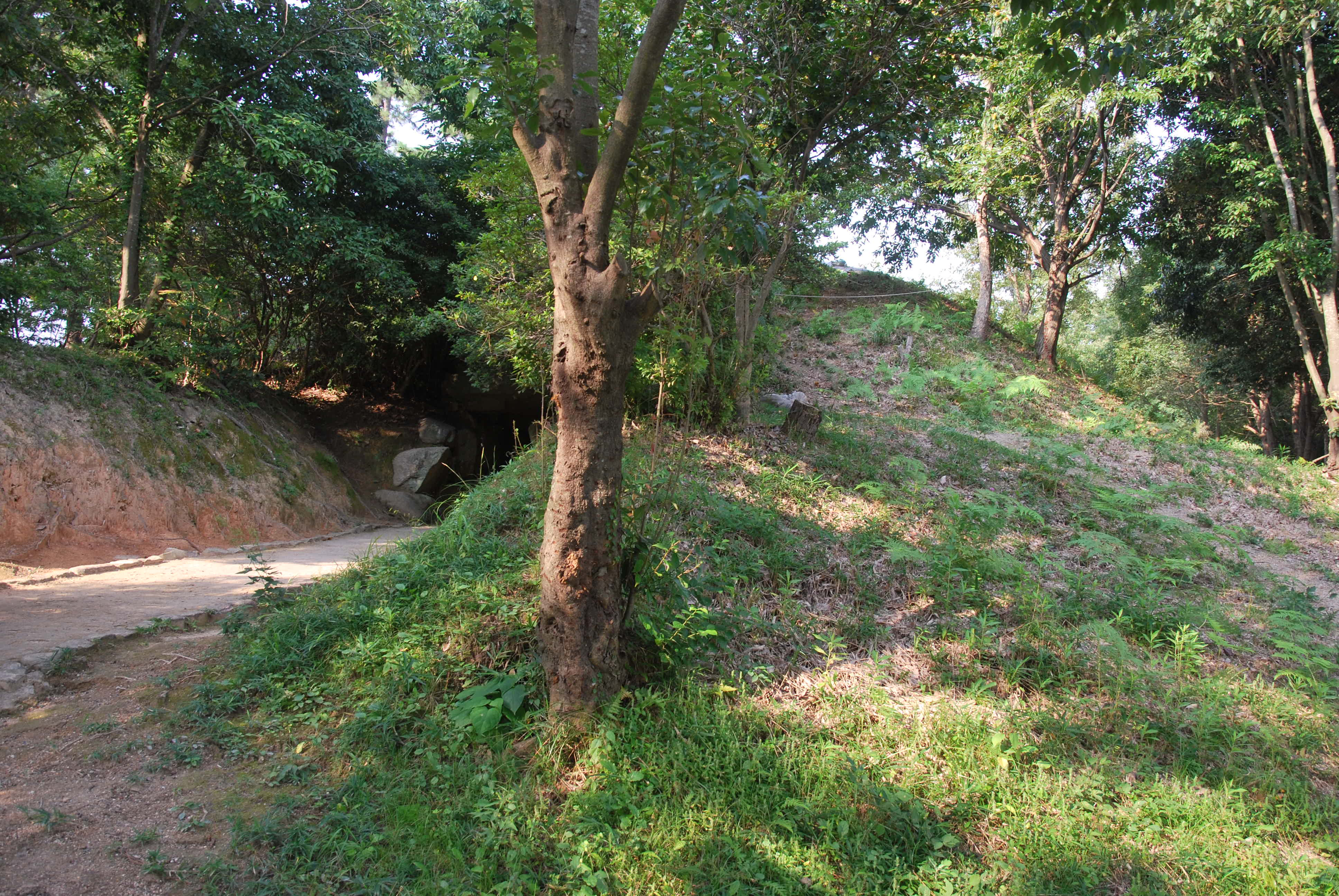
Posterior circular portion

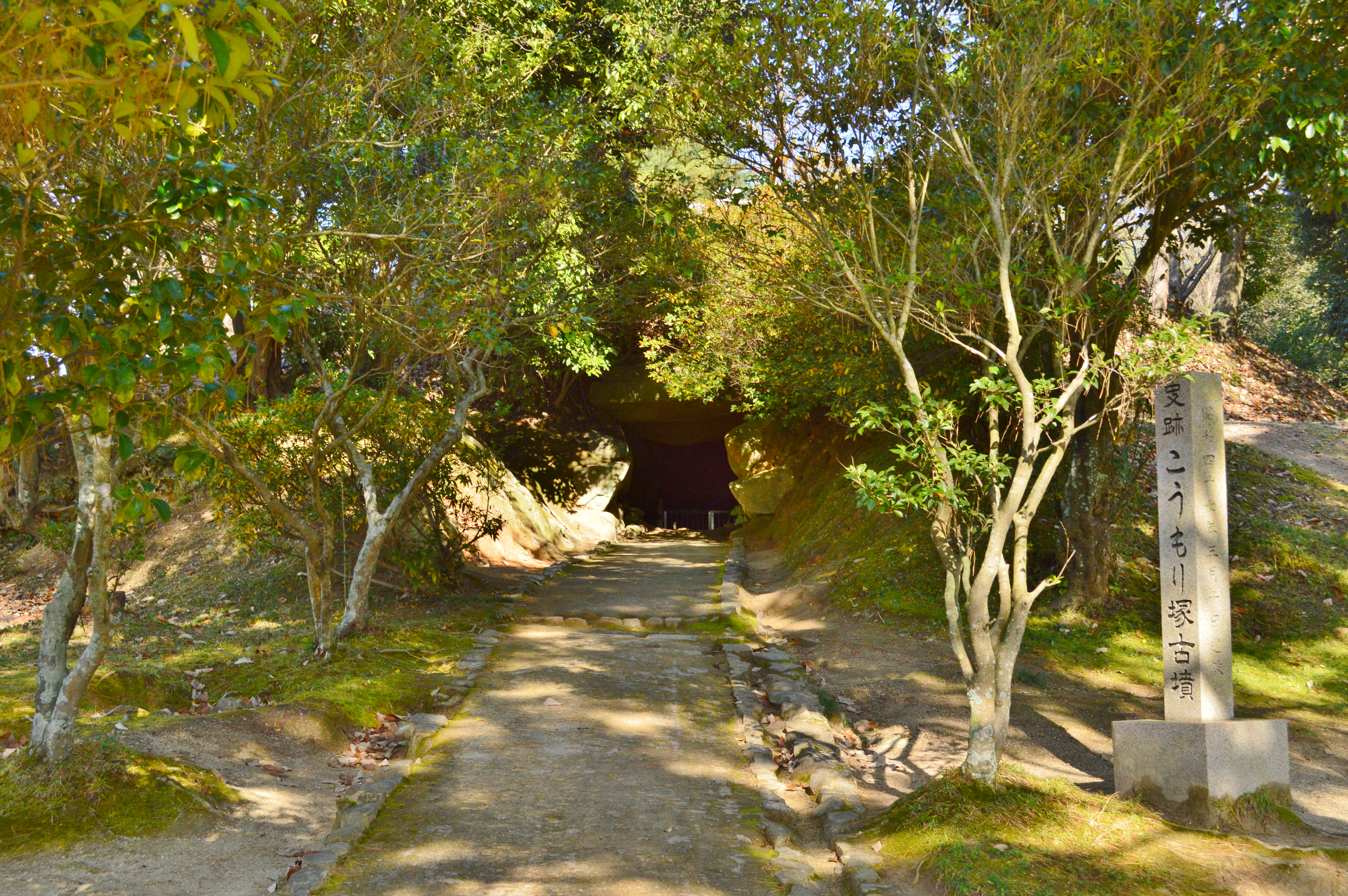
Entry

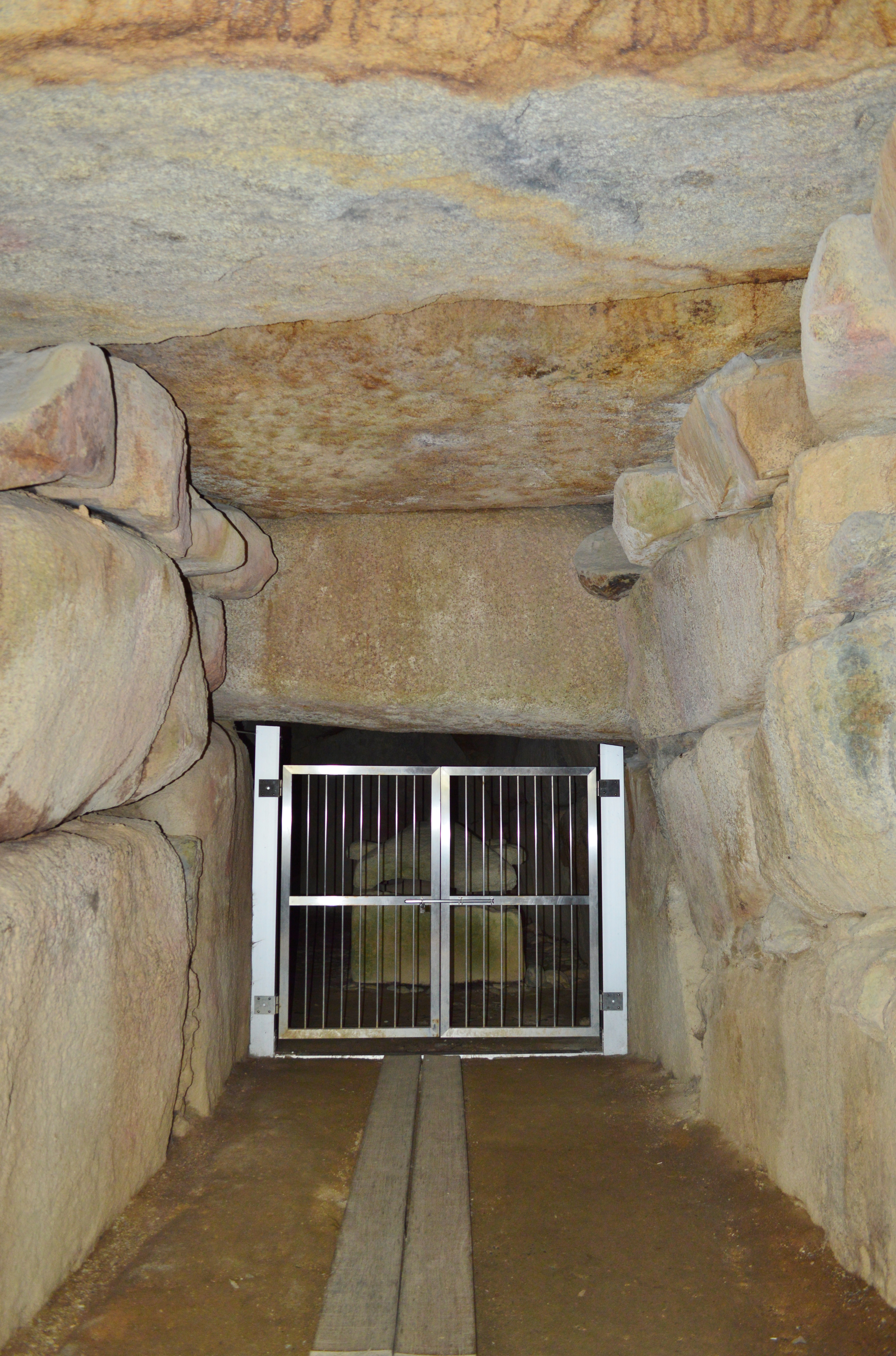
Passage

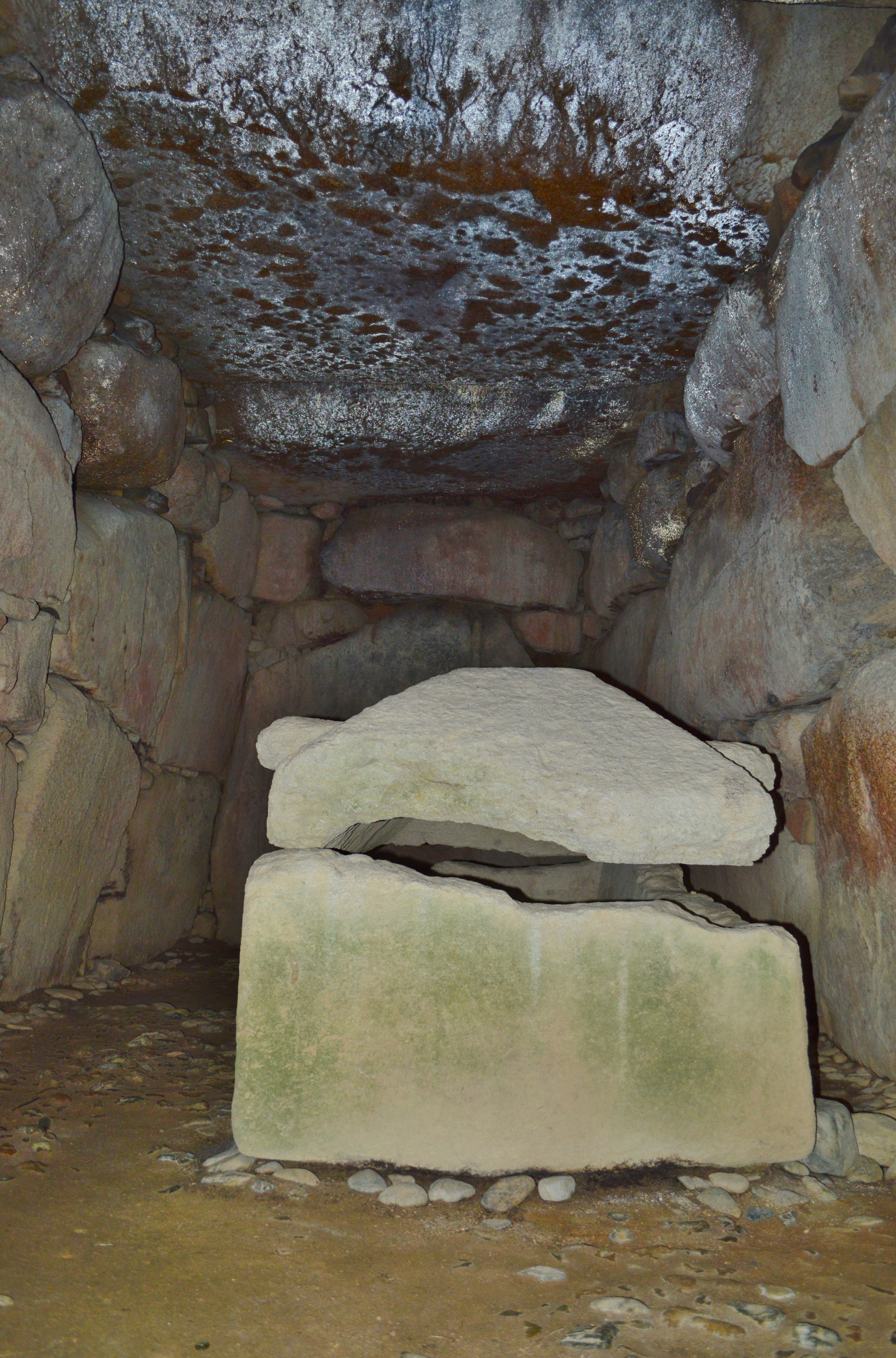
Inside the burial chamber

== See also ==
- List of Historic Sites of Japan (Okayama)
