= Bitchū Kokubun-ji =

Historic religious ruin in Sōja, Okayama, Japan

- 備中国分寺 (Japanese)
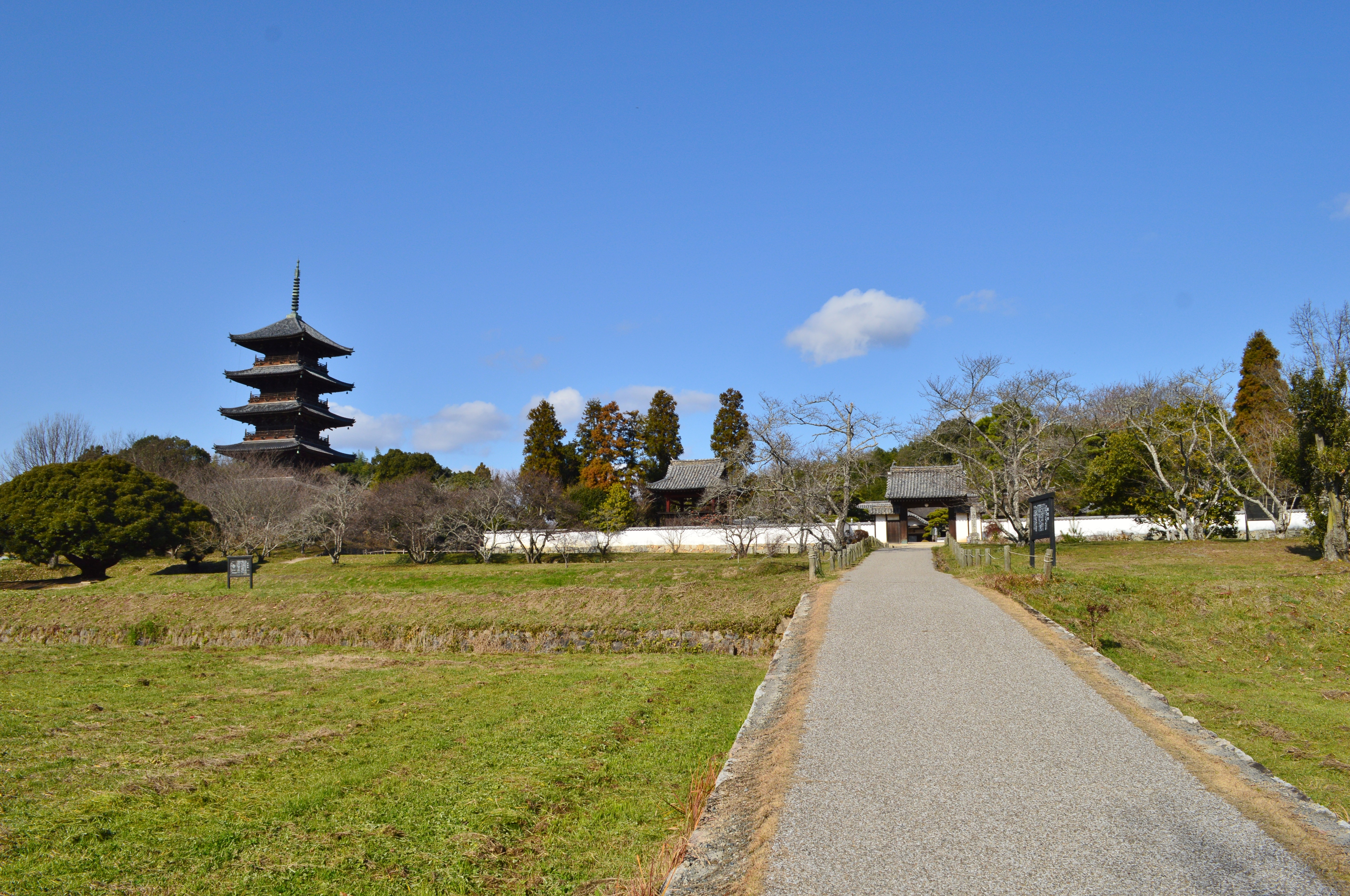
- Bitchū Kokubun-ji

- Location within Okayama Prefecture Location within Japan
- 34°39′59.08″N 133°46′55.77″E
- Type: Buddhist temple ruins
- Location: Sōja, Okayama, Japan

History
- Founder: Emperor Shōmu
- Built: c.741 AD
- National Important Cultural Property National Historic Site of Japan

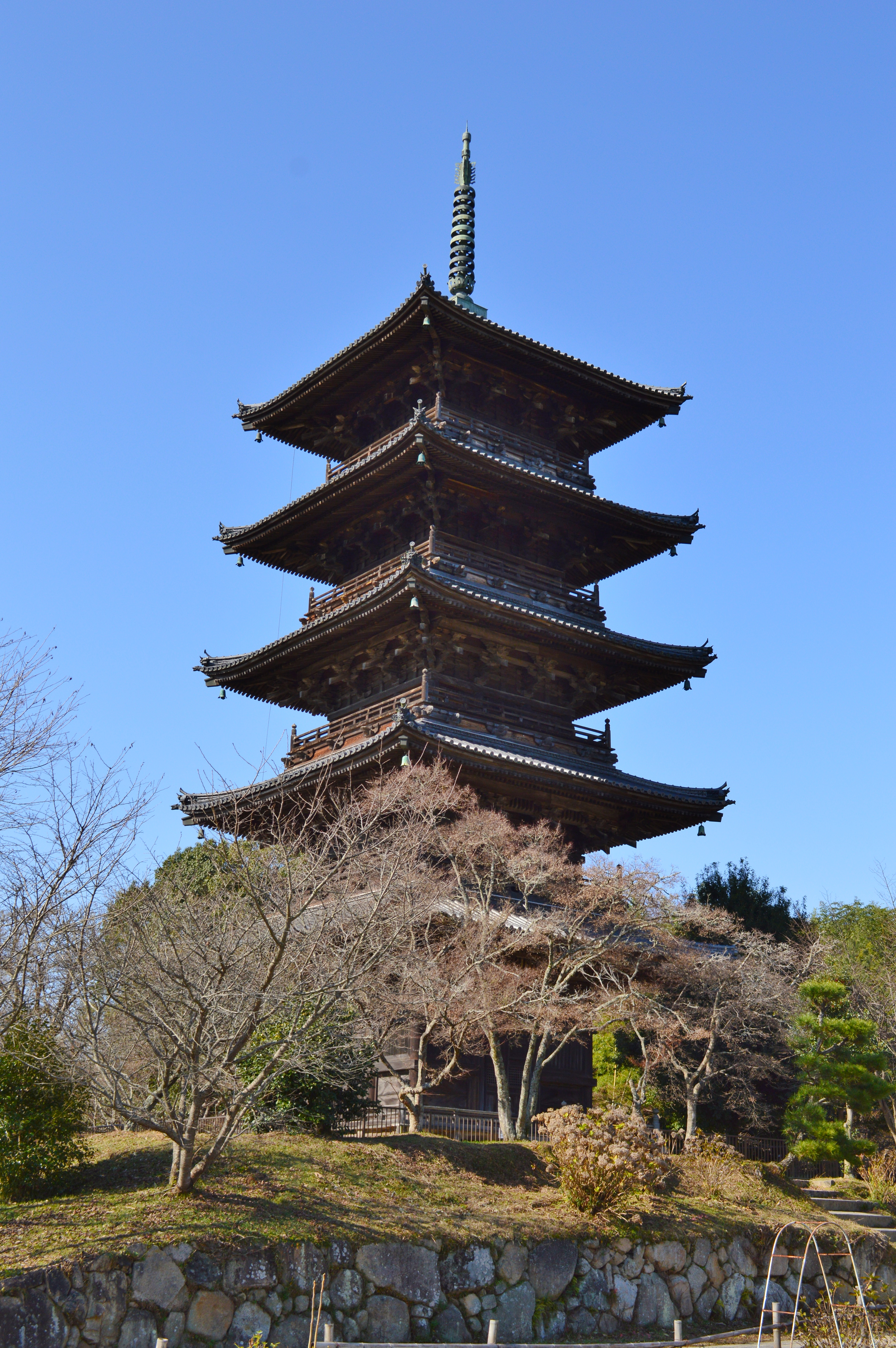
Bitchū Kokubun-ji Pagoda (ICP)

The Bitchū Kokubun-ji (備中国分寺) is an Omuro-branch Shingon Buddhist temple located in what is now the Kamibayashi neighborhood of the city of Sōja, Japan. Its main image is a statue of Yakushi Nyorai. It claims to be the successor to one of the provincial temples per the system established by Emperor Shōmu during the Nara period (710 – 794) for the purpose of promoting Buddhism as the national religion of Japan and standardising imperial rule over the provinces.

The ruins of the original Bitchū Kokubun-ji were designated as a National Historic Site in 1968, but the ruins of the associated provincial nunnery, the Bitchū Kokubun-niji (備中国分尼寺) were actually designated earlier, in 1922.

== Overview ==
The Shoku Nihongi records that in 741 AD, as the country recovered from a major smallpox epidemic, Emperor Shōmu ordered that a state-subsidized monastery and nunnery be established in every province for the promotion of Buddhism and to enhance political unification per the new ritsuryō system. These were the kokubunji (国分寺). The temples were constructed per a more-or-less standardized template, and were each to be staffed by twenty clerics who would pray for the state's protection. The associated provincial nunneries (kokubunniji) were on a smaller scale, each housing ten nuns to pray for the atonement of sins. This system declined when the capital was moved from Nara to Kyoto in 794 AD.

== Bitchū Kokubun-ji ==
Little is known of the history of the Bitchū Kokubun-ji. According to the temple's own account, it had become abandoned after it was burned down in the wars of the Nanboku-chō period, and was rebuilt during the Tenshō era (1573–1592) by Shimizu Muneharu, the lord of Bitchū-Takamatsu Castle; however, it fell into decline again and was rebuilt during the Hōei era (1704–1711) in the mid-Edo period. These dates are supported by earthenware fragments found at the site. During archaeological excavations, the Nara-period temple was found to have occupied an area of two chō (approximately 218 meters square) and the cornerstones of the South Gate and Middle Gate were discovered. The site of the modern temple overlaps with the original temple, so many details are not clear; however, the original temple appears to have a layout patterned after Hokki-ji in Ikaruga, Nara. The foundations of the Kondō have not been found.

The temple's landmark 34.3 meter five-story stone pagoda dates from the mid-Edo period reconstruction of the temple. It is designated a National Important Cultural Property.

The temple is located in the Kibiji Fudoki-no-Oka Prefectural Natural Park (吉備路風土記の丘県立自然公園), and Kōmorizuka Kofun is nearby. The site is about ten minutes by taxi from Higashi-Sōja Station on the JR West Momotaro Line. The Bitchū Kokubun-niji is about 600 meters east.

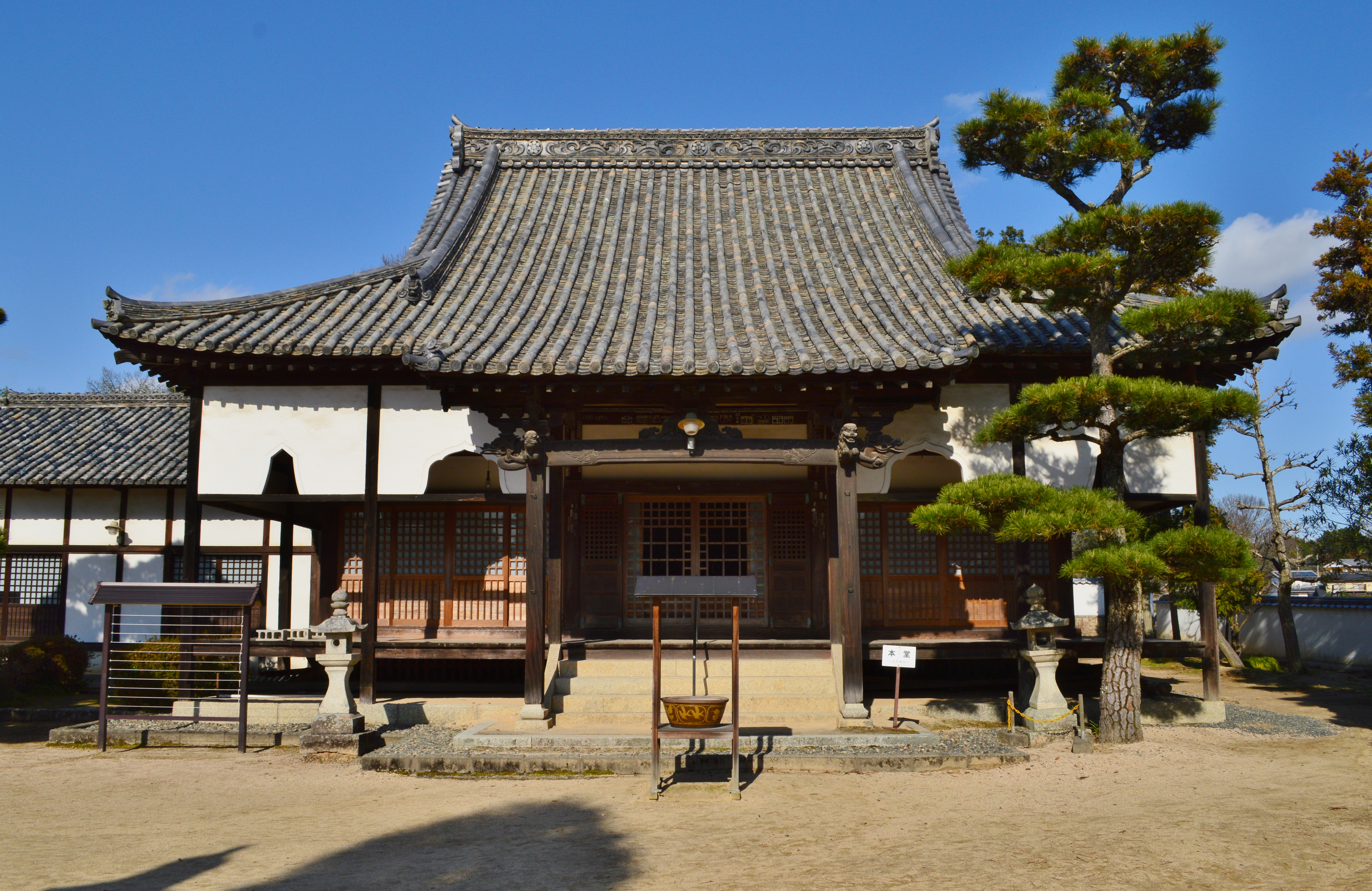
Hondō

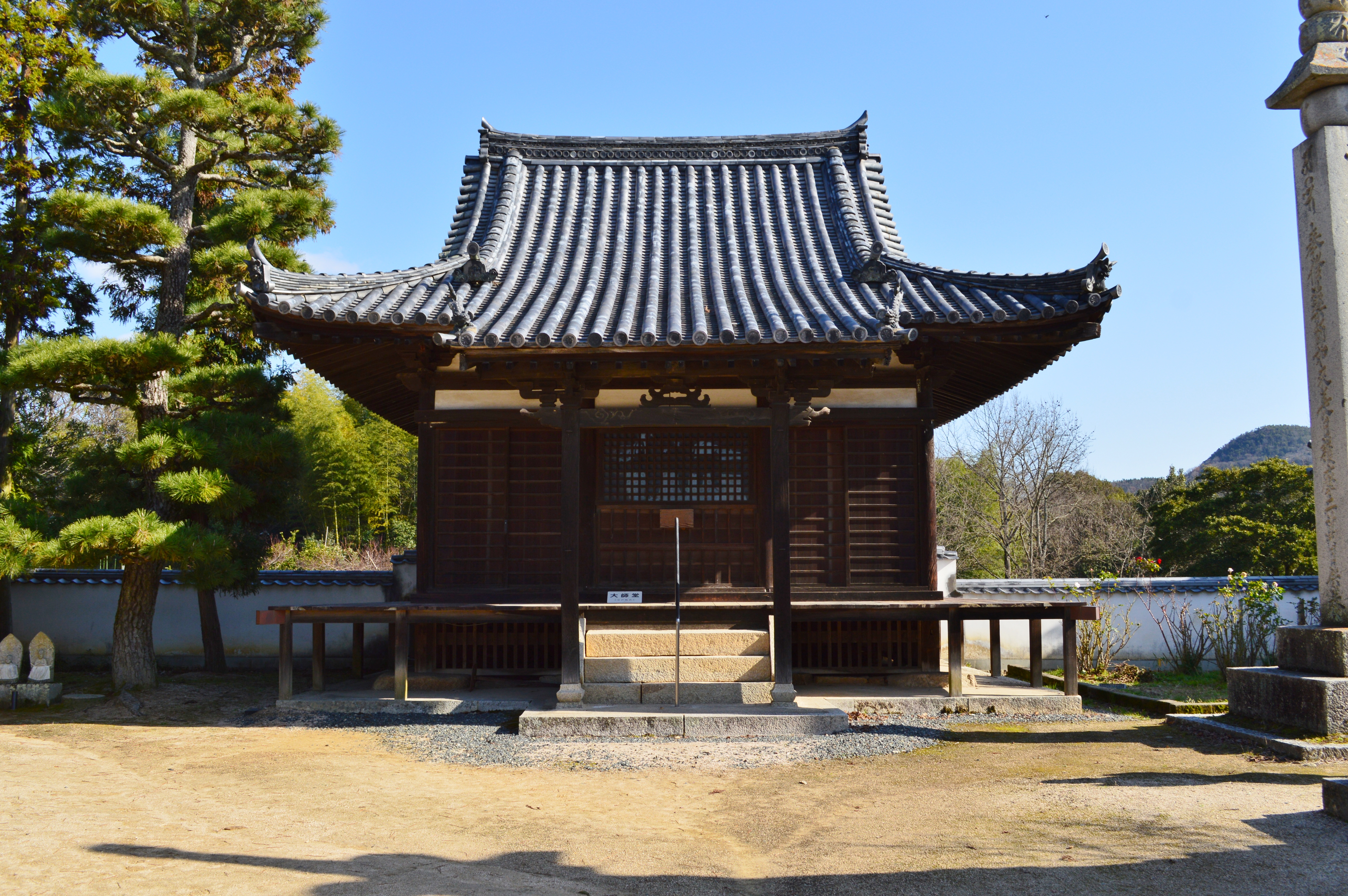
Daishi-dō

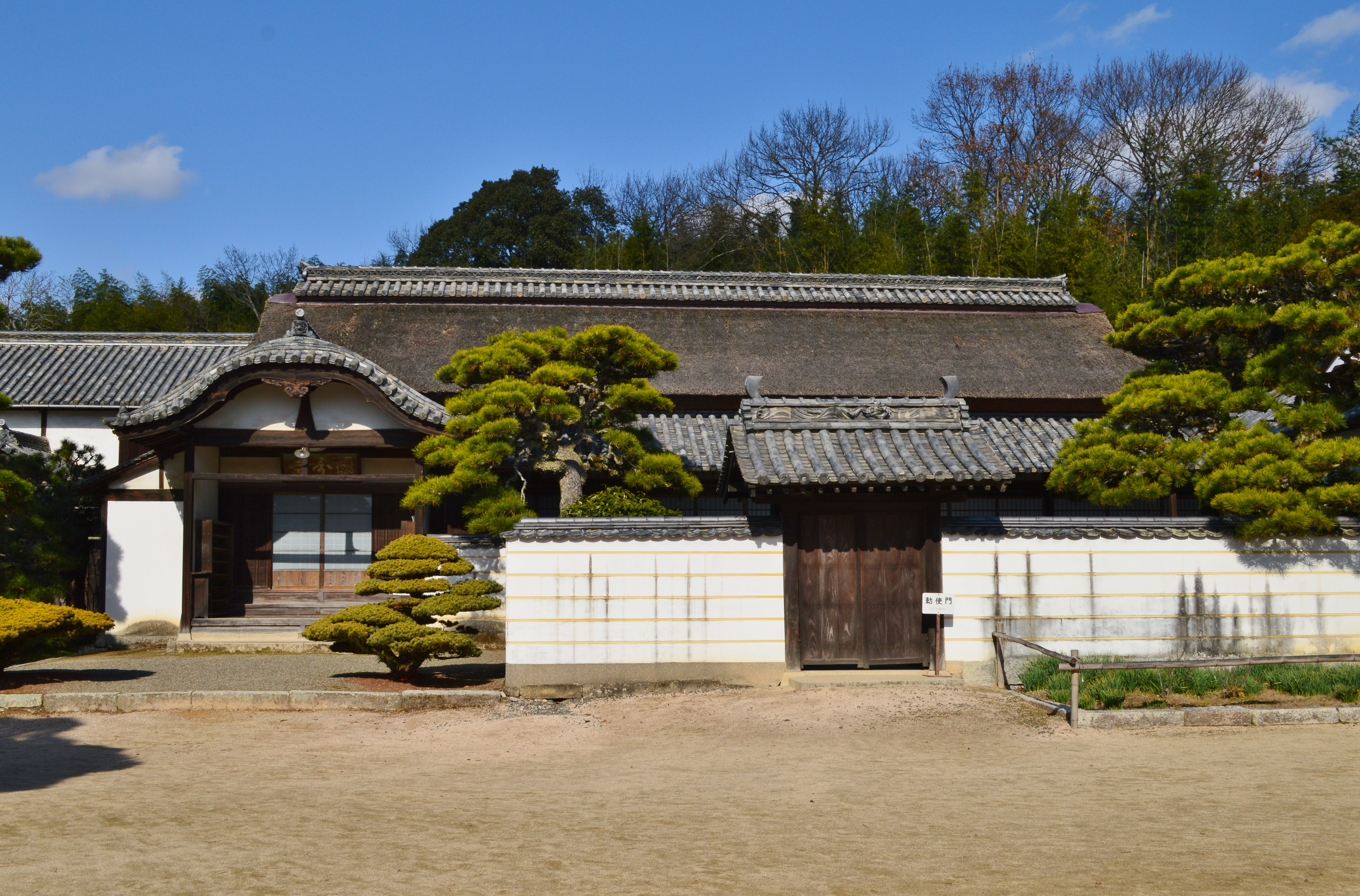
Kyakuden

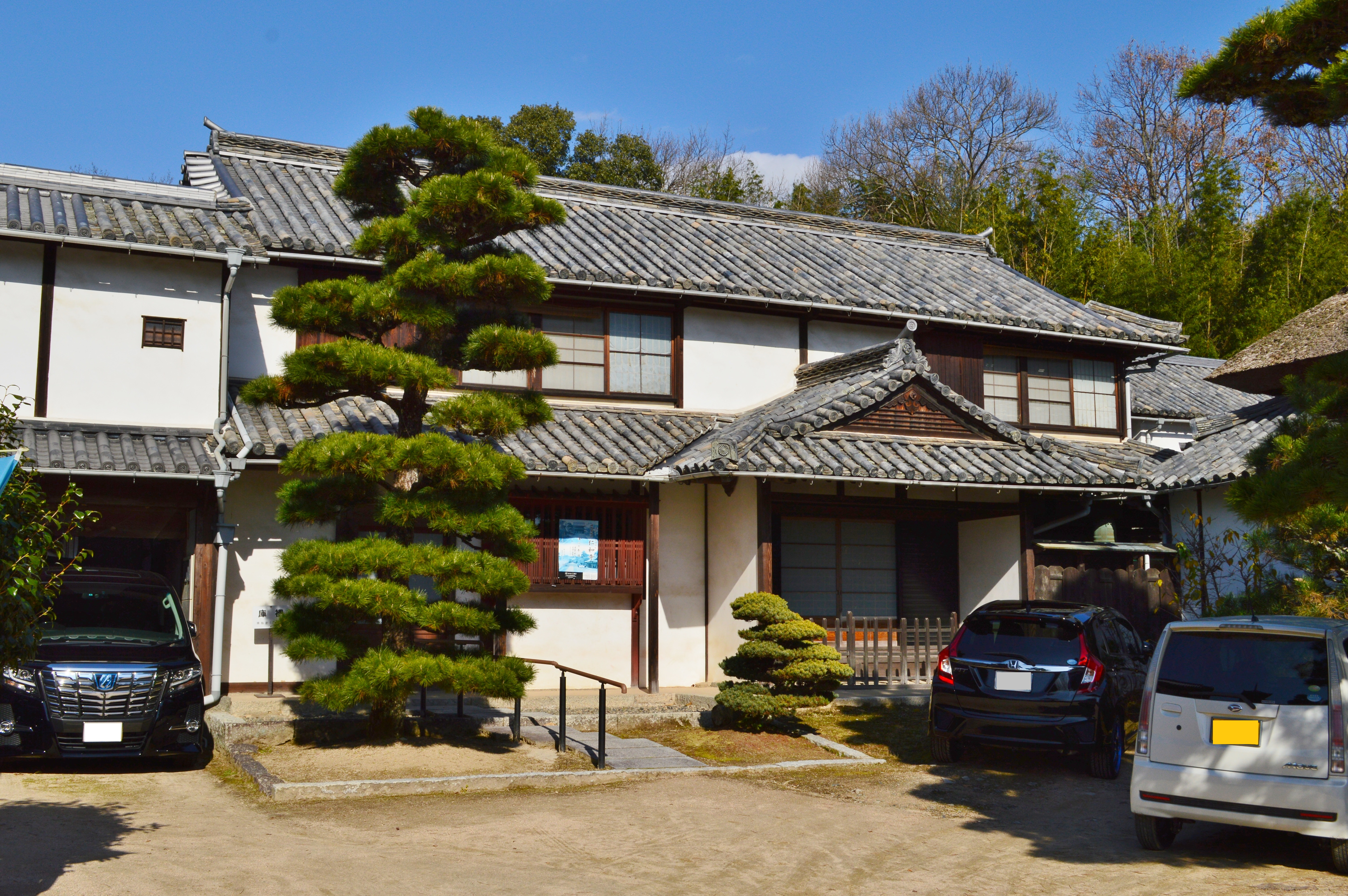
Kuri (Okayama Prefecture ICP)

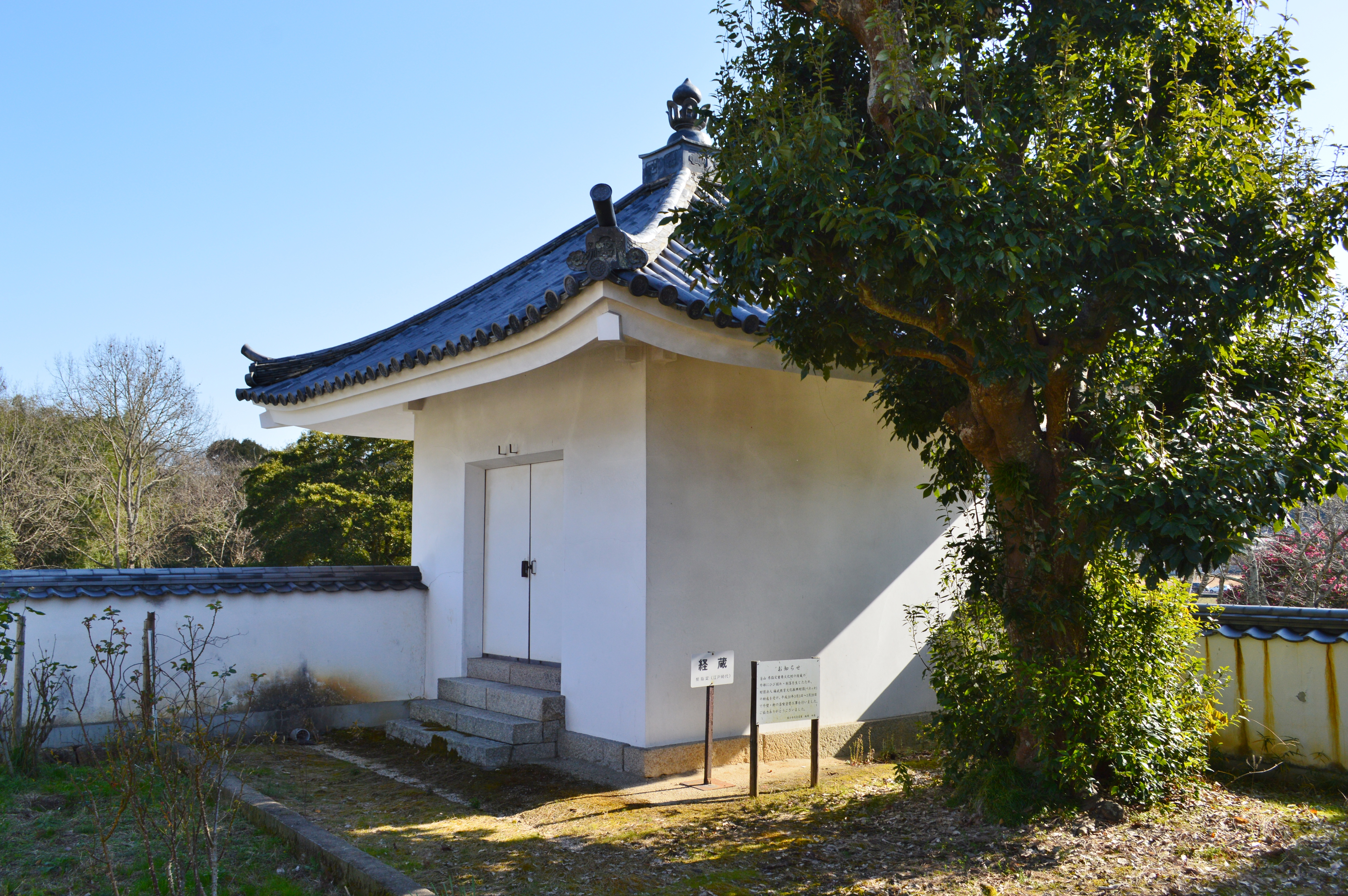
Kyōzō (Okayama Prefecture ICP)

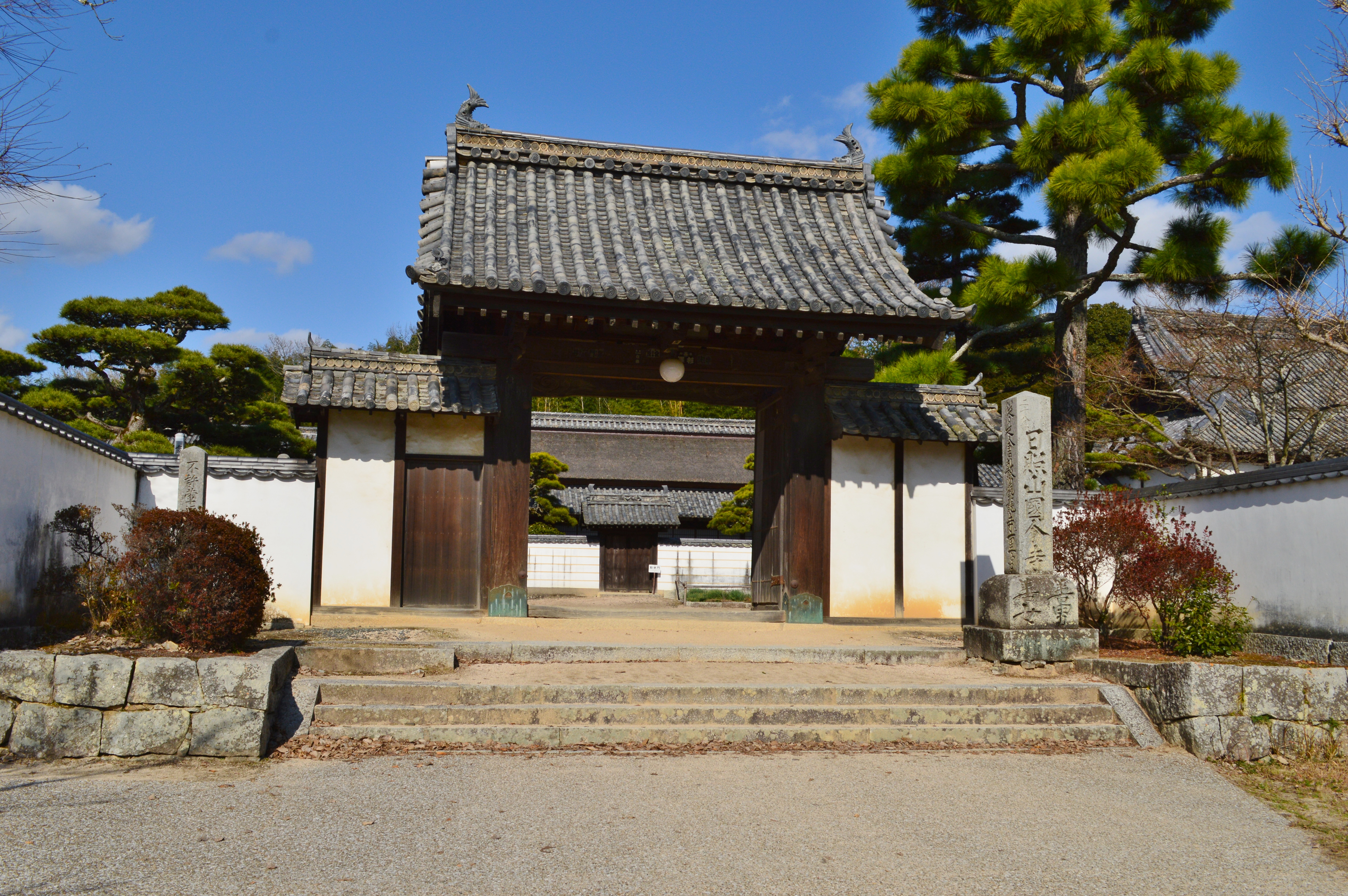
Sanmon

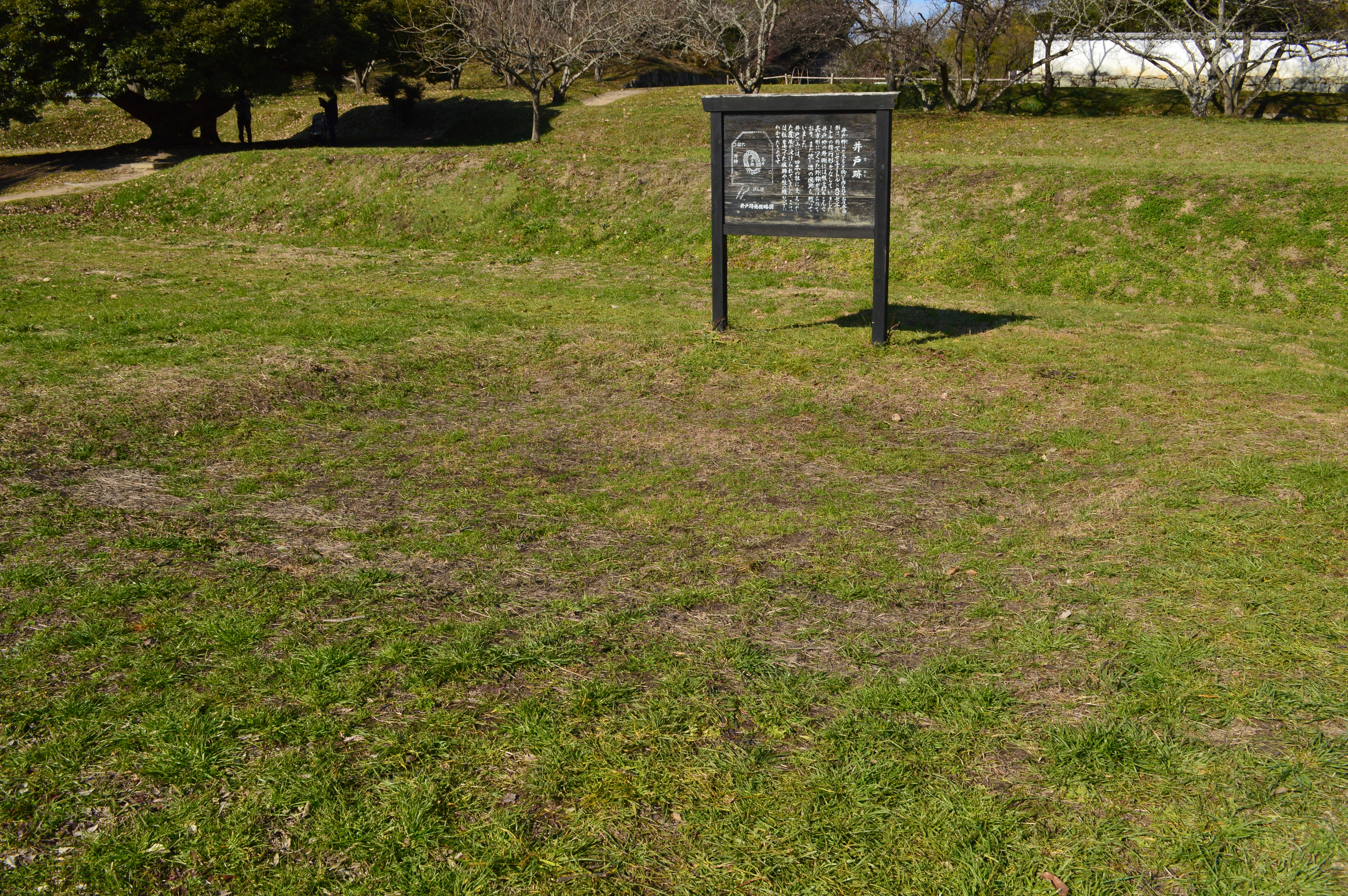
Site of well

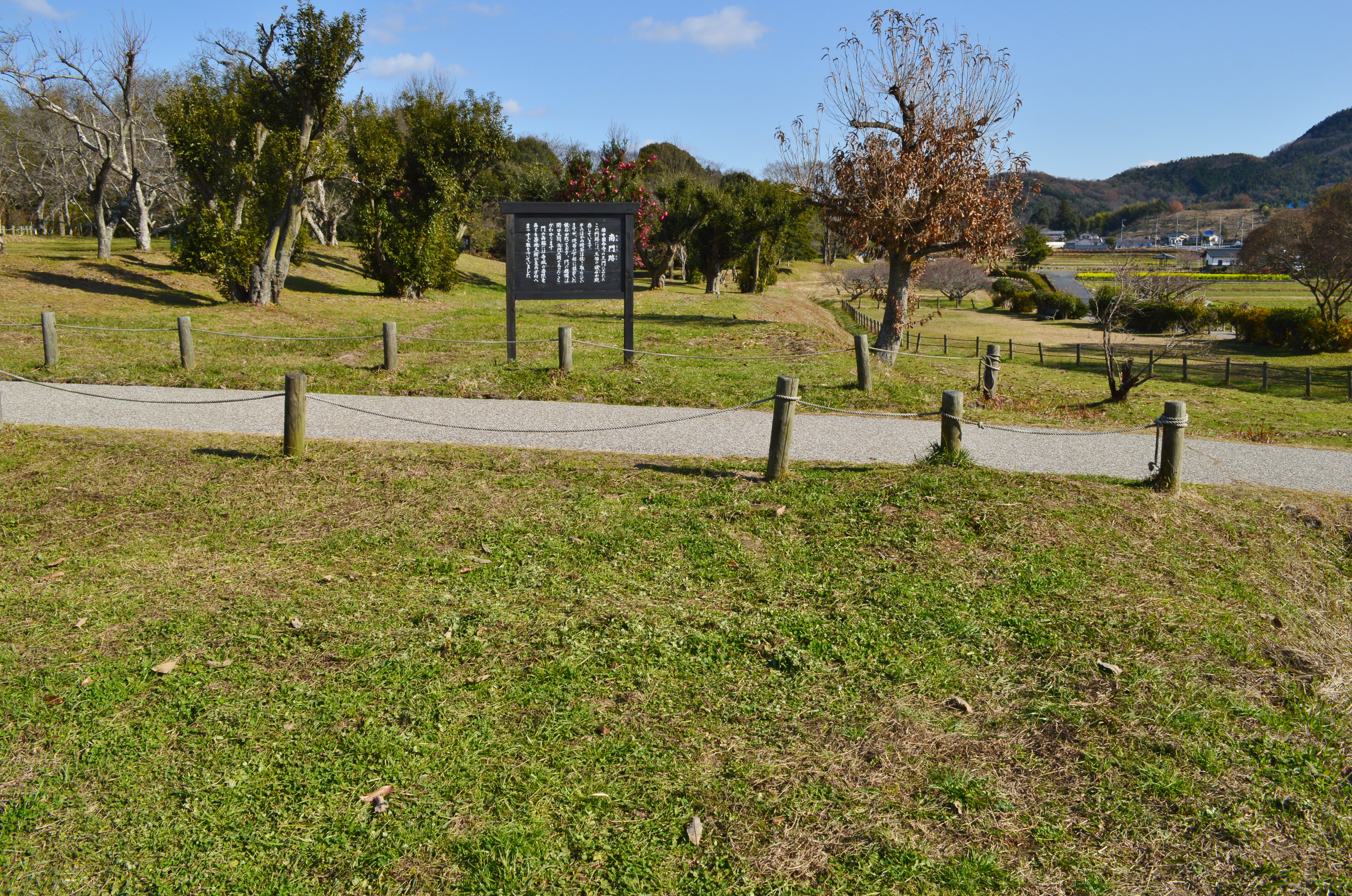
Foundations of original South Gate

== Bitchū Kokubun-niji ==
The ruins of the provincial nunnery, or Bitchū Kokubun-niji, is located 600 meters east of the Bitchū Kokubun-ji (34°40′02.10″N 133°47′18.08″E). It occupied a compound 108 meters east-lowest by 216 meters north-to-south. Nothing is known of its history, and it appears to have been destroyed by fire in the Nanboku-chō period. The foundation stones for the South gate, a portion of the Middle Gate, Kondō, Lecture Hall and nun's quarters have been found on north–south axis.

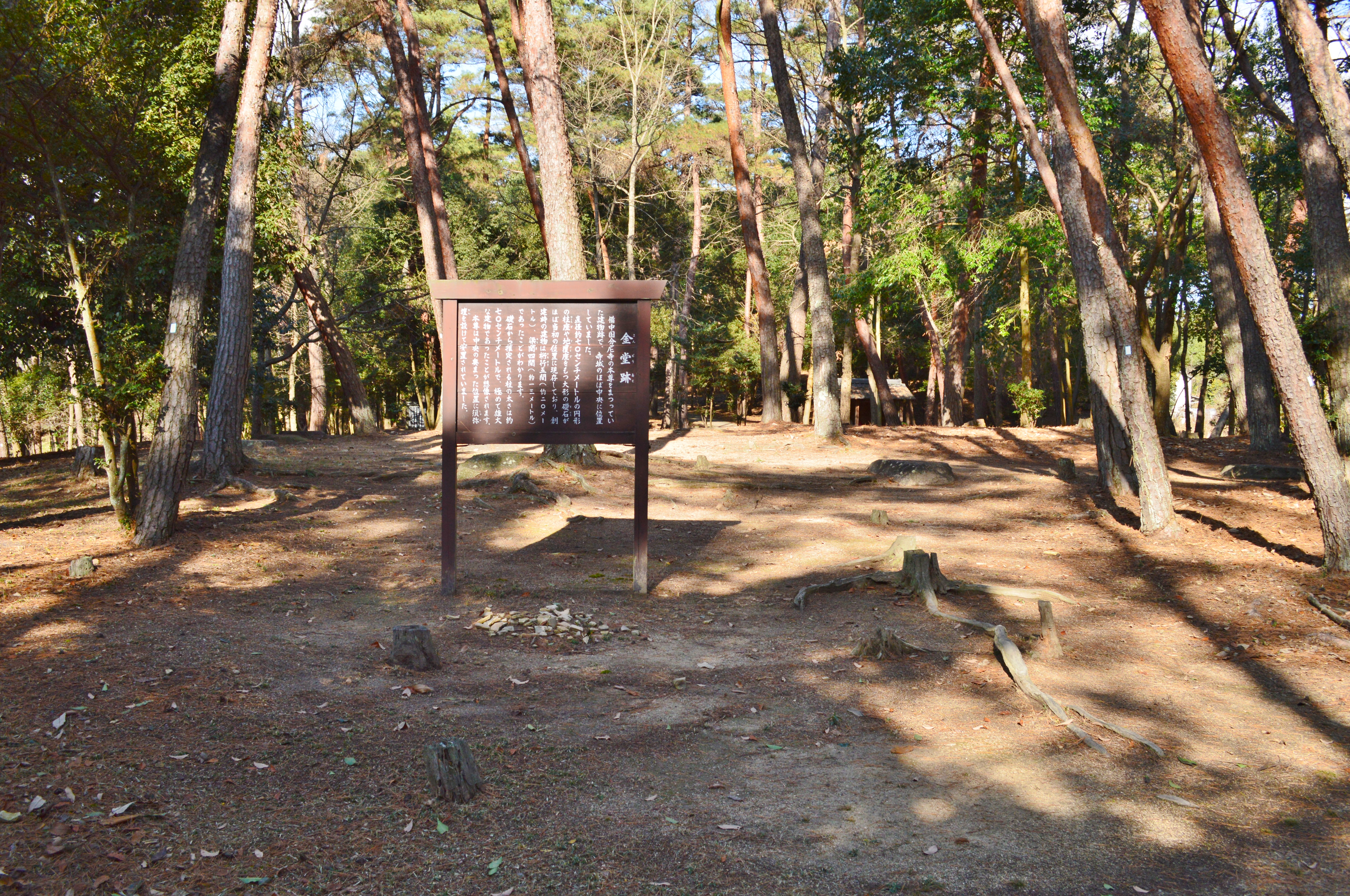
Site of the Kondō

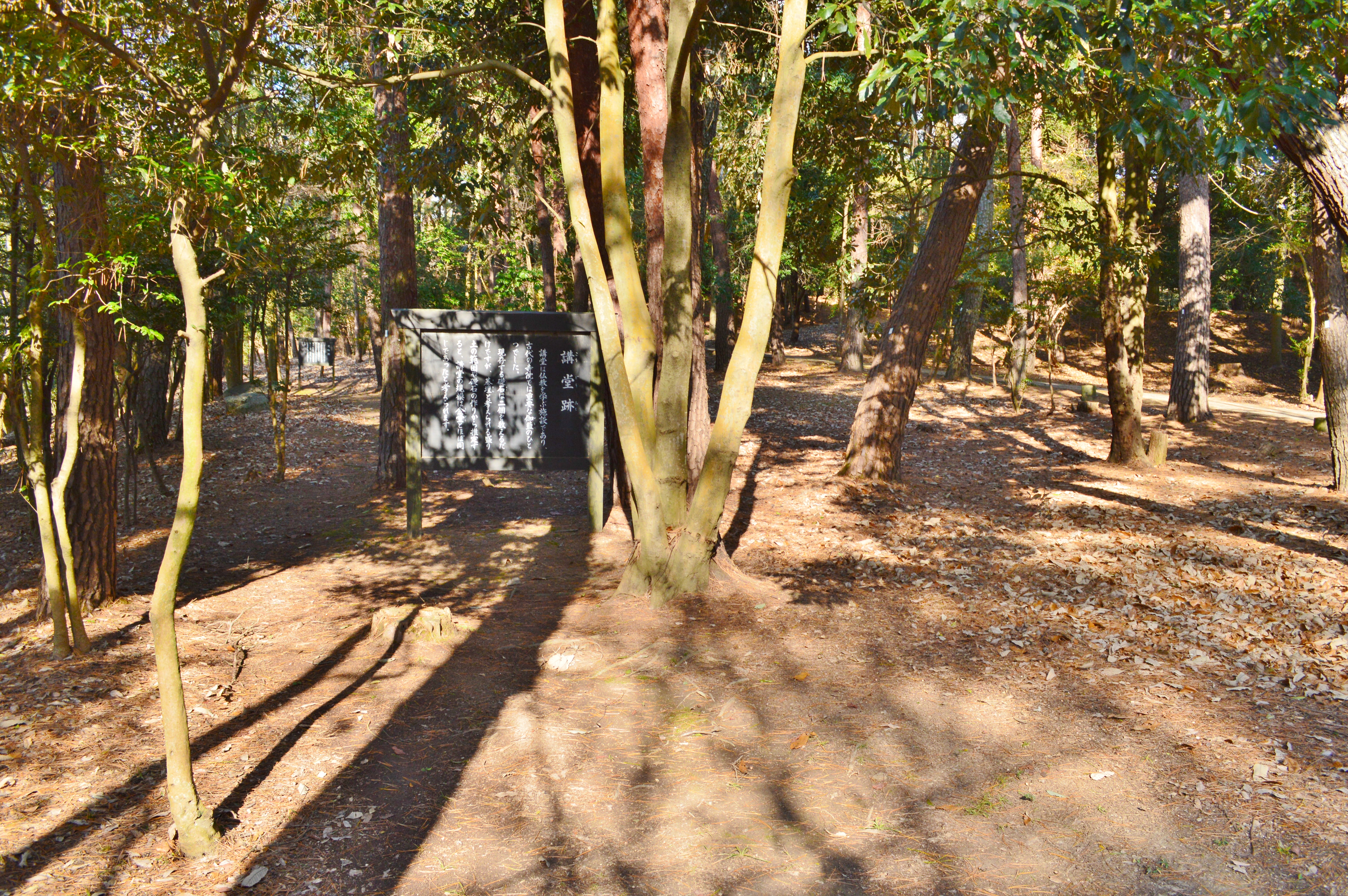
Site of the Lecture Hall

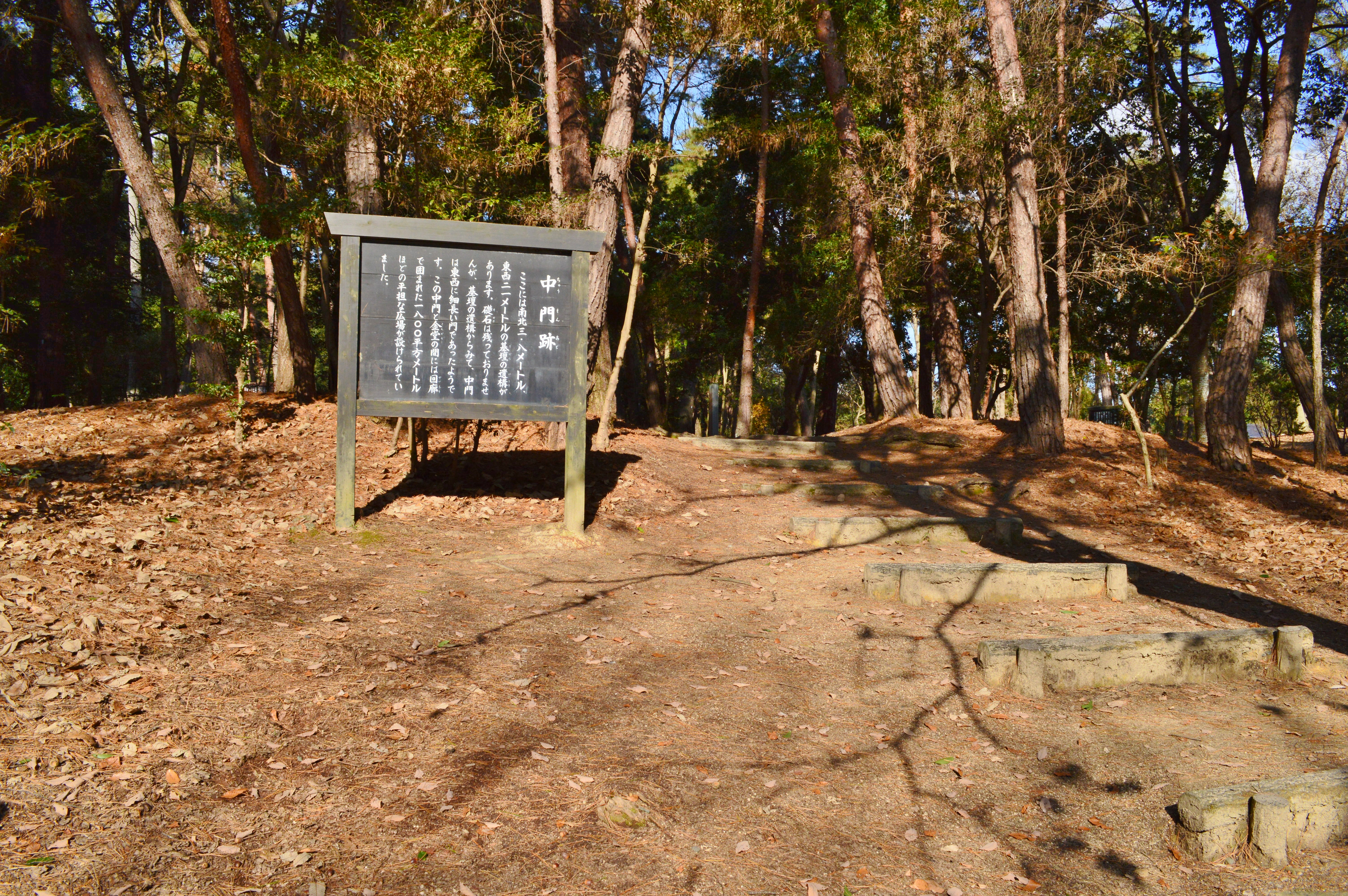
Site of the Middle gate

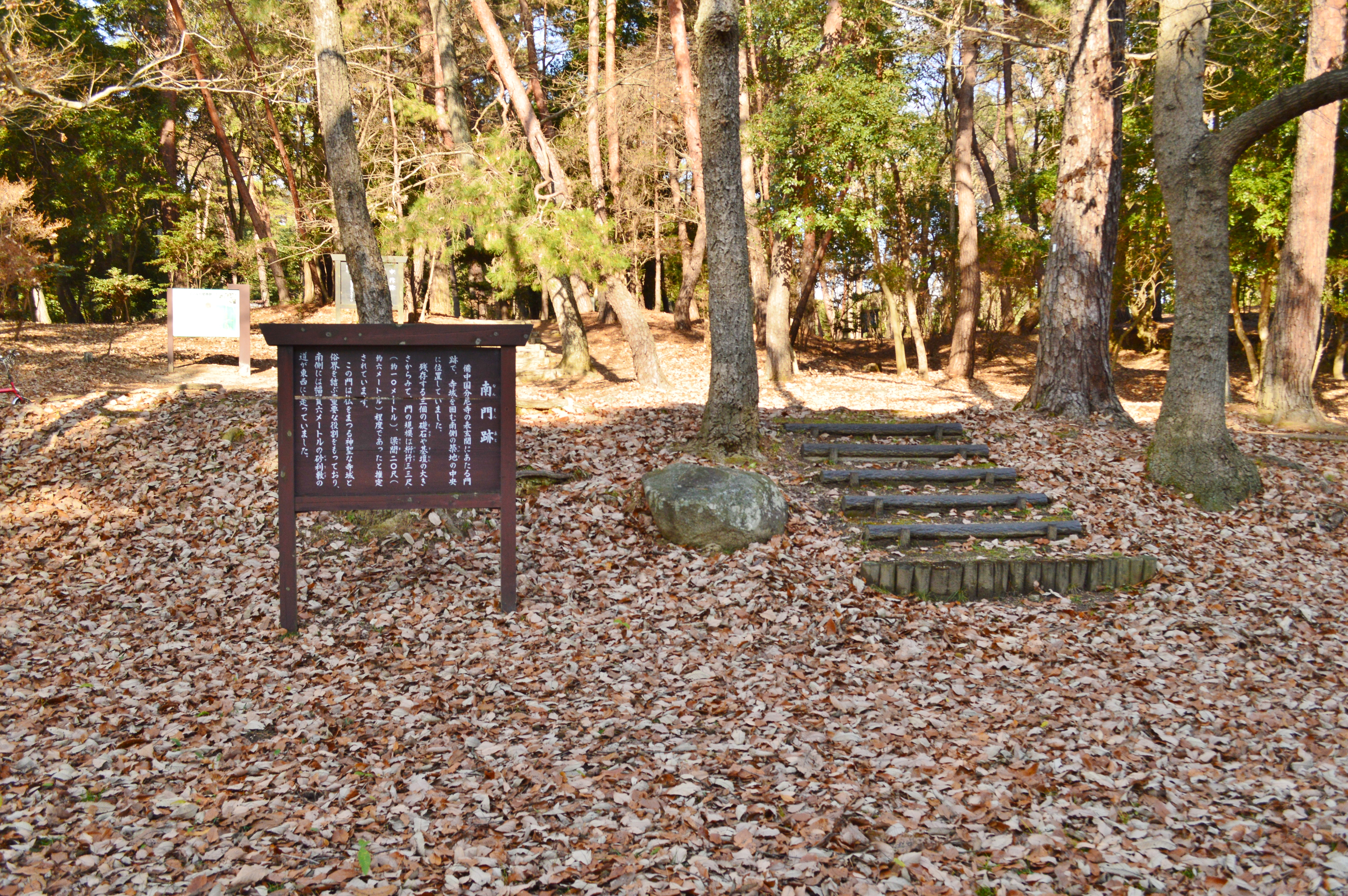
Site of the South gate

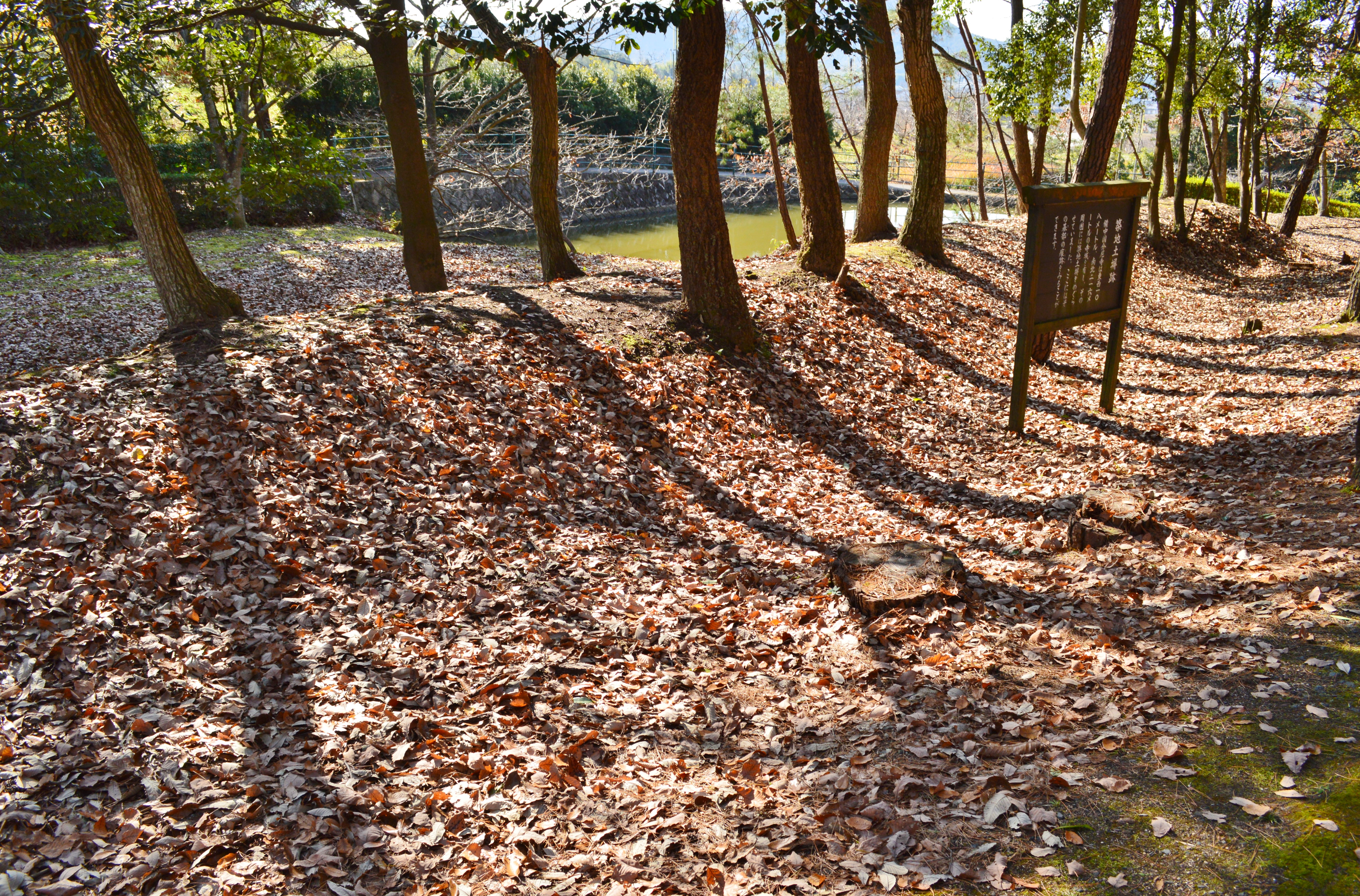
Remants of perimeter earthen walls

== See also ==
- List of Historic Sites of Japan (Okayama)
- provincial temple
