= Kokubu Station =

Kokubu Station (国分駅) is the name of two train stations in Japan:

- Kokubu Station (Kagawa)
- Kokubu Station (Kagoshima)
