= Kamogawa Station =

Railway station in Sakaide, Kagawa Prefecture, Japan

Y06 Kamogawa Station 鴨川駅
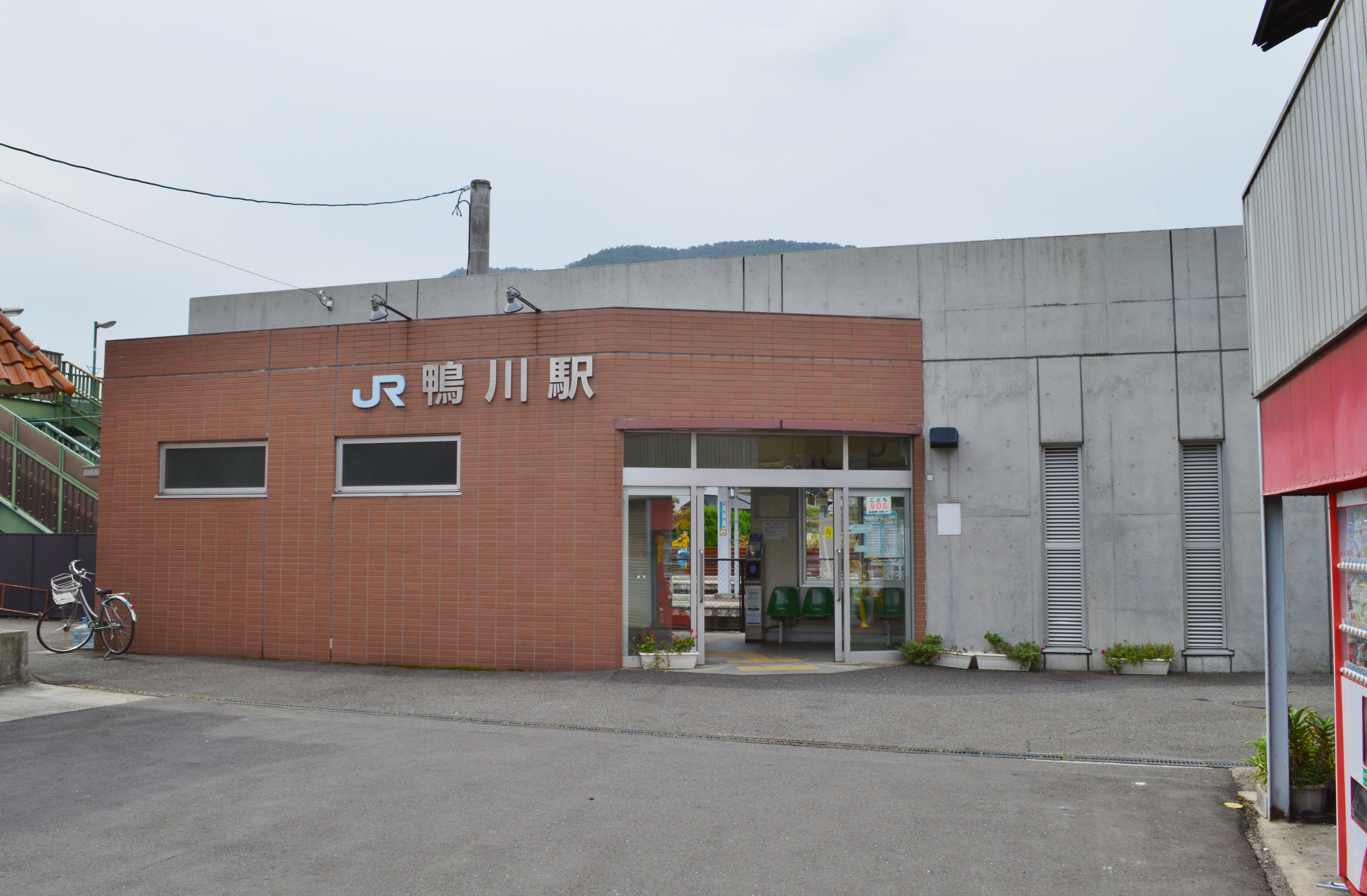
- Kamogawa Station in 2017

General information
- Location: 6039-2 Fuchūchō, Sakaide-shi, Kagawa-ken 762-0024; Japan
- Coordinates: 34°18′24″N 133°54′19″E
- Operator: JR Shikoku
- Line: ■ Yosan Line
- Distance: 16.6 km from Takamatsu
- Platforms: 2 island platforms
- Tracks: 4 + 1 freight siding

Construction
- Structure type: At grade

Other information
- Status: Unstaffed
- Station code: Y06

History
- Opened: 21 February 1897

Passengers
- FY2019: 350
Location
- Location within Kagawa Prefecture Location within Japan

Kamogawa Station (鴨川駅, Kamogawa-eki) is a junction passenger railway station located in the city of Sakaide, Kagawa Prefecture, Japan. It is operated by JR Shikoku and has the station number "Y06".

== Lines ==
Kamogawa Station is served by the JR Shikoku Yosan Line and is located 16.6 km from the beginning of the line at Takamatsu. Yosan line local, Rapid Sunport, and Nanpū Relay services stop at the station. The Marine Liner rapid service on the Seto-Ohashi Line which plies between Okayama and Takamatsu also stops at the station. Although Tadotsu is the official start of the Dosan Line, some of its local trains start from and return to Takamatsu. These trains also stop at Kamogawa.

== Layout ==
The station consists of two island platforms serving four tracks. A concrete station building by the side of the tracks is unstaffed and serves only as a waiting room. Access to the island platforms is by means of a footbridge. In addition there is a siding serving a disused freight platform.

== Adjacent stations ==
«	Service	»
Yosan Line
Kokubu	Rapid Sunport	Sakaide
Kokubu	Rapid Nanpū Relay	Sakaide
Sanuki-Fuchū	Local	Yasoba
Dosan Line
Sanuki-Fuchū	Local	Yasoba
Seto-Ōhashi Line
Kokubu	Rapid Marine Liner	Sakaide

== History ==
Kamogawa Station opened on 21 February 1897 as an intermediate stop when the track of the privately Sanuki Railway (later the Sanyo Railway) was extended from Marugame to Takamatsu. After the railway as nationalized on 1 December 1906, Japanese Government Railways (JGR) took over the station and operated it as part of the Sanuki Line (later the Sanyo and then the Yosan Main Line). With the privatization of Japanese National Railways (JNR, the successor of JGR) on 1 April 1987, control of the station passed to JR Shikoku.

== Surrounding area ==
- Japan National Route 11

== See also ==
- List of railway stations in Japan
