= Railway platform =

Fixed structure to allow people to board or alight trains

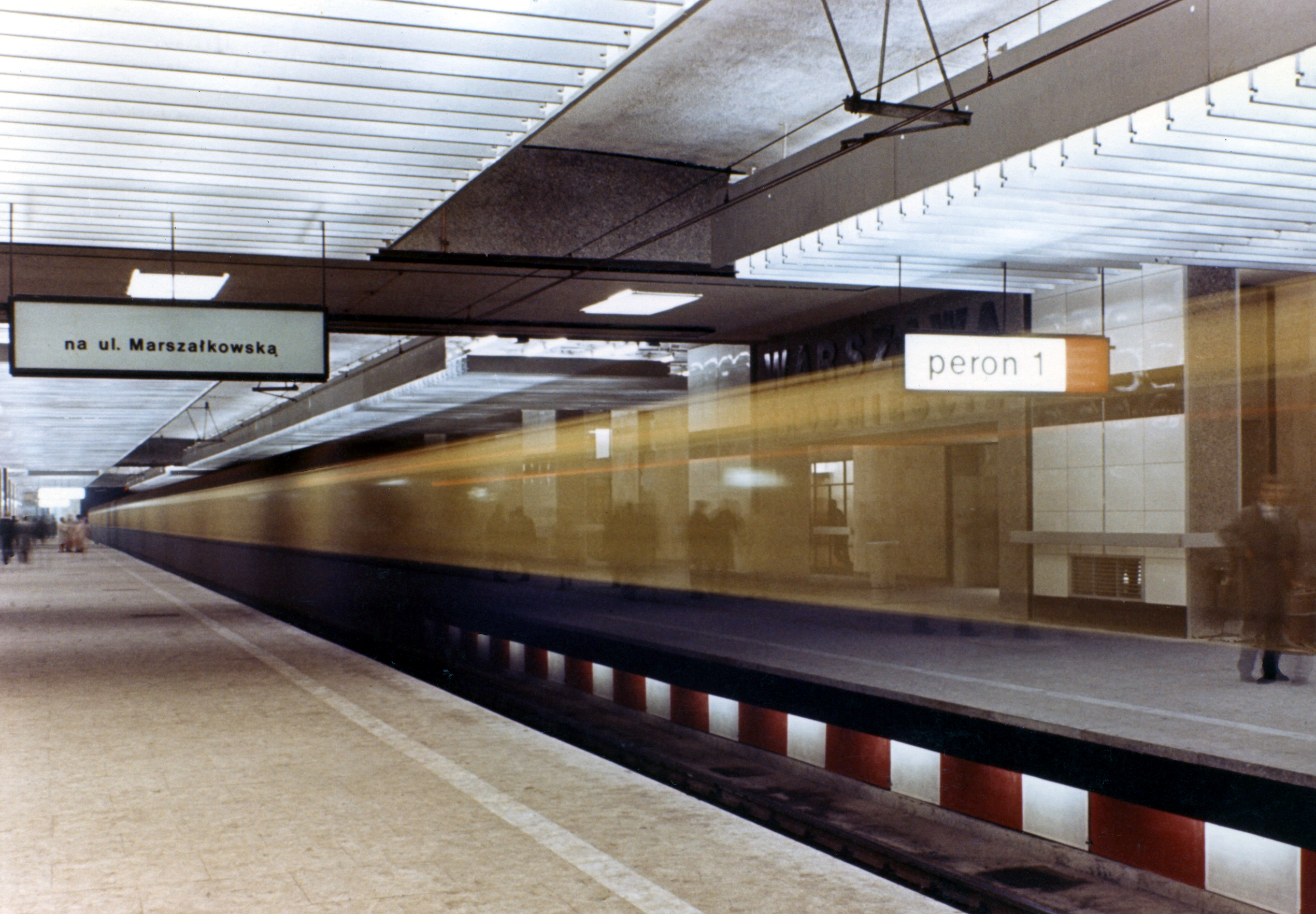
Platforms at Warszawa Śródmieście railway station dated 1963, Poland

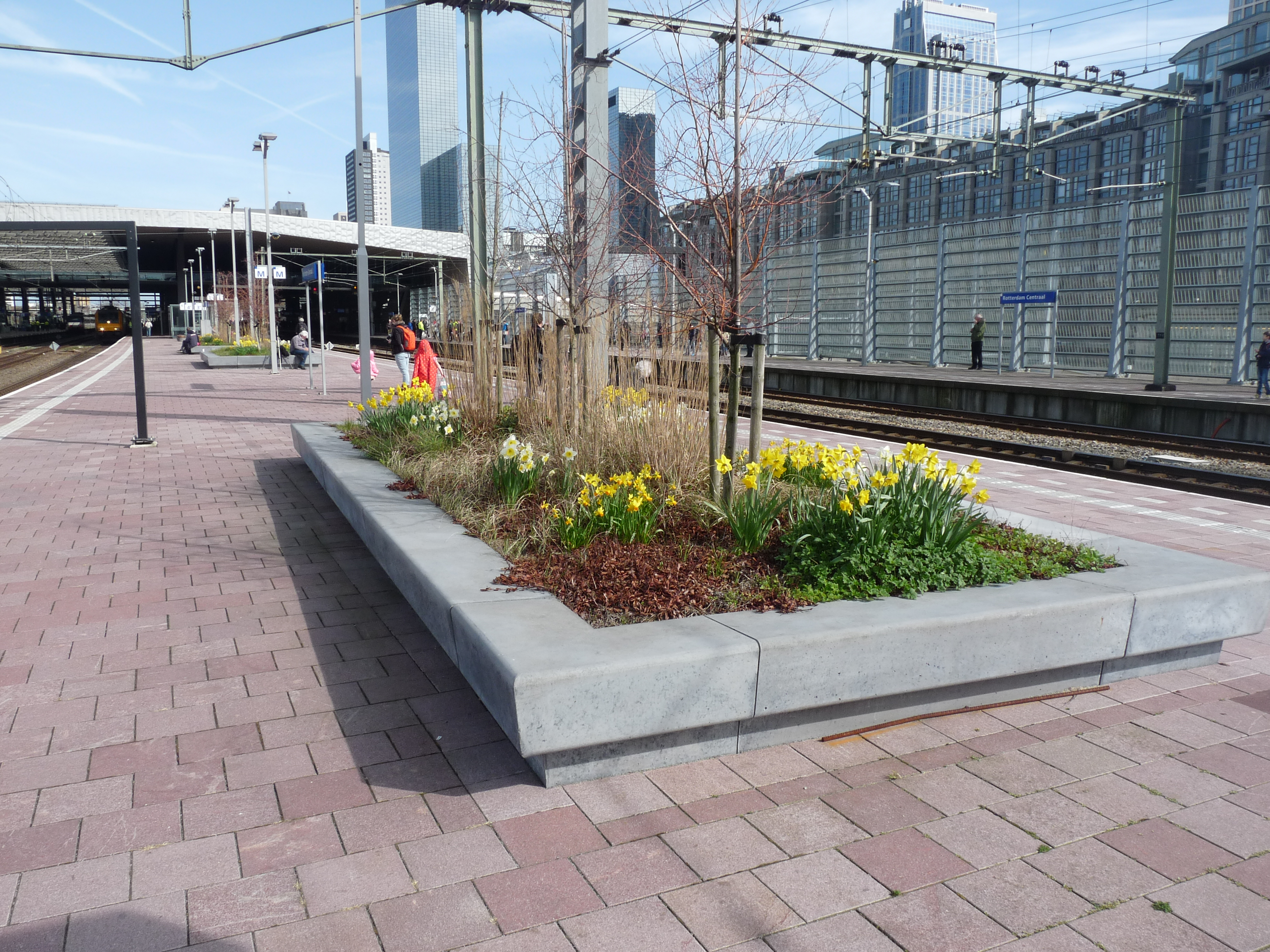
Platform at Rotterdam Centraal station, Netherlands

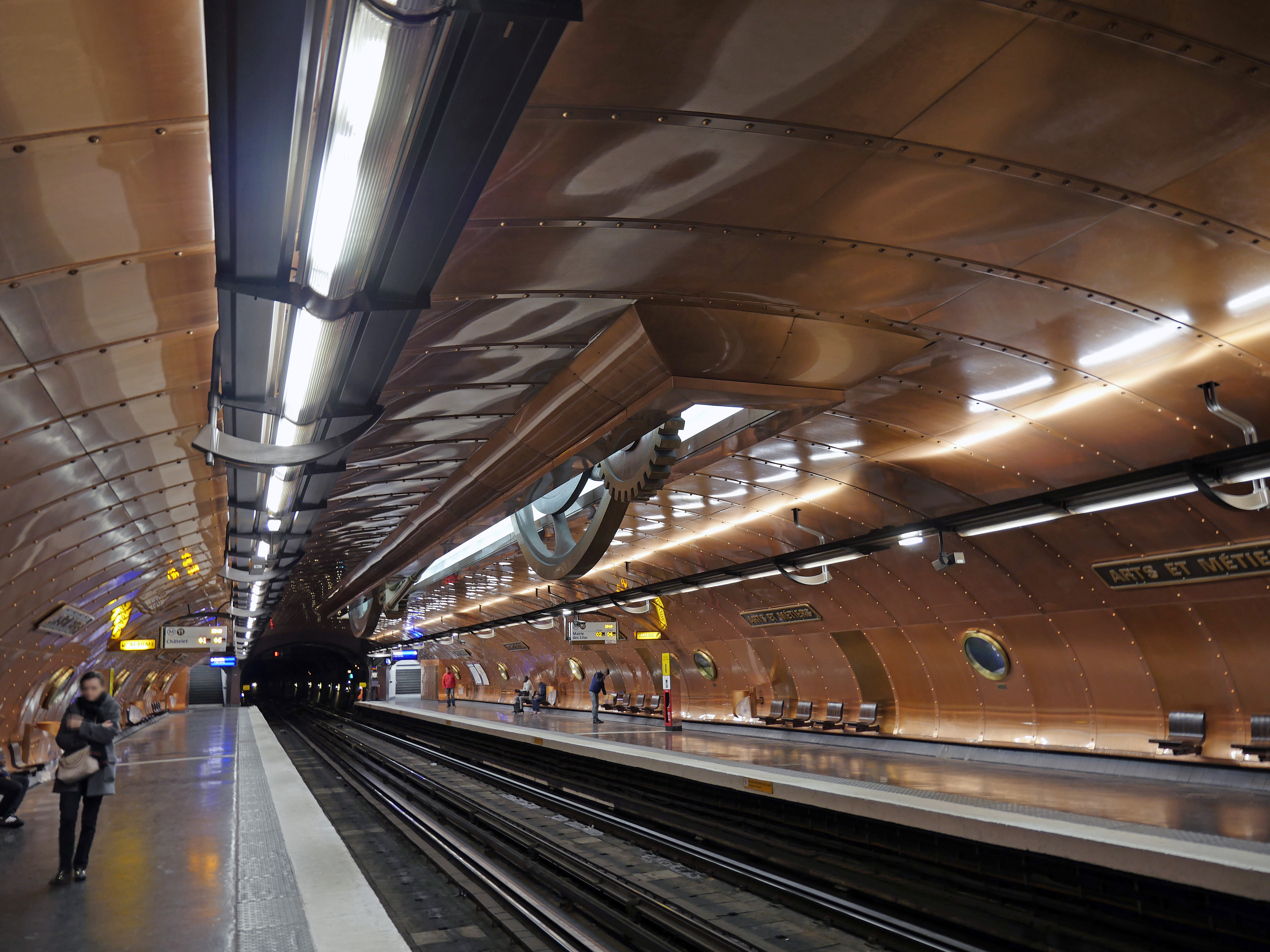
Station platforms at Arts et Métiers station on Line 11 of the Paris Métro

A railway platform is an area in a train station alongside a railway track providing convenient access to trains. Almost all stations have some form of platform, with larger stations having multiple platforms.

Grand Central Terminal in Midtown Manhattan hosts 44 platforms, more than any other rail station in the world. The world's longest station platform is at Hubballi Junction in India at 1,507 metres (4,944 ft). The Appalachian Trail station or Benson station in the United States, at the other extreme, has a platform which is only long enough for a single bench.

Among some American train conductors, the word "platform" has entered usage as a verb meaning "to berth at a station", as in the announcement: "The last two cars of this train will not platform at East Rockaway".

== Height relative to trains ==
The most basic form of platform consists of an area at the same level as the track, usually resulting in a fairly large height difference between the platform and the train floor. This would often not be considered a true platform. The more traditional platform is elevated relative to the track but often lower than the train floor, although ideally it should be at the same level. Occasionally the platform is higher than the train floor, where a train with a low floor serves a station built for trains with a high floor, for example at the Dutch stations of the DB Regionalbahn Westfalen (see Enschede). On the London Underground some stations are served by both District line and Piccadilly line trains, and the Piccadilly trains have lower floors.

A tram stop is often in the middle of the street; usually it has as a platform a refuge area of a similar height to that of the sidewalk, e.g. 100 mm (4 in), and sometimes has no platform. The latter requires extra care by passengers and other traffic to avoid accidents. Both types of tram stops can be seen in the tram networks of Melbourne and Toronto. Sometimes a tram stop is served by ordinary trams with rather low floors and metro-like light rail vehicles with higher floors, and the tram stop has a dual-height platform. A railway station may be served by heavy-rail and light-rail vehicles with lower floors and have a dual- height platform, as on the RijnGouweLijn in the Netherlands.

In all cases the platform must accommodate the loading gauge and conform to the structure gauge of the system.

== Types of platform ==
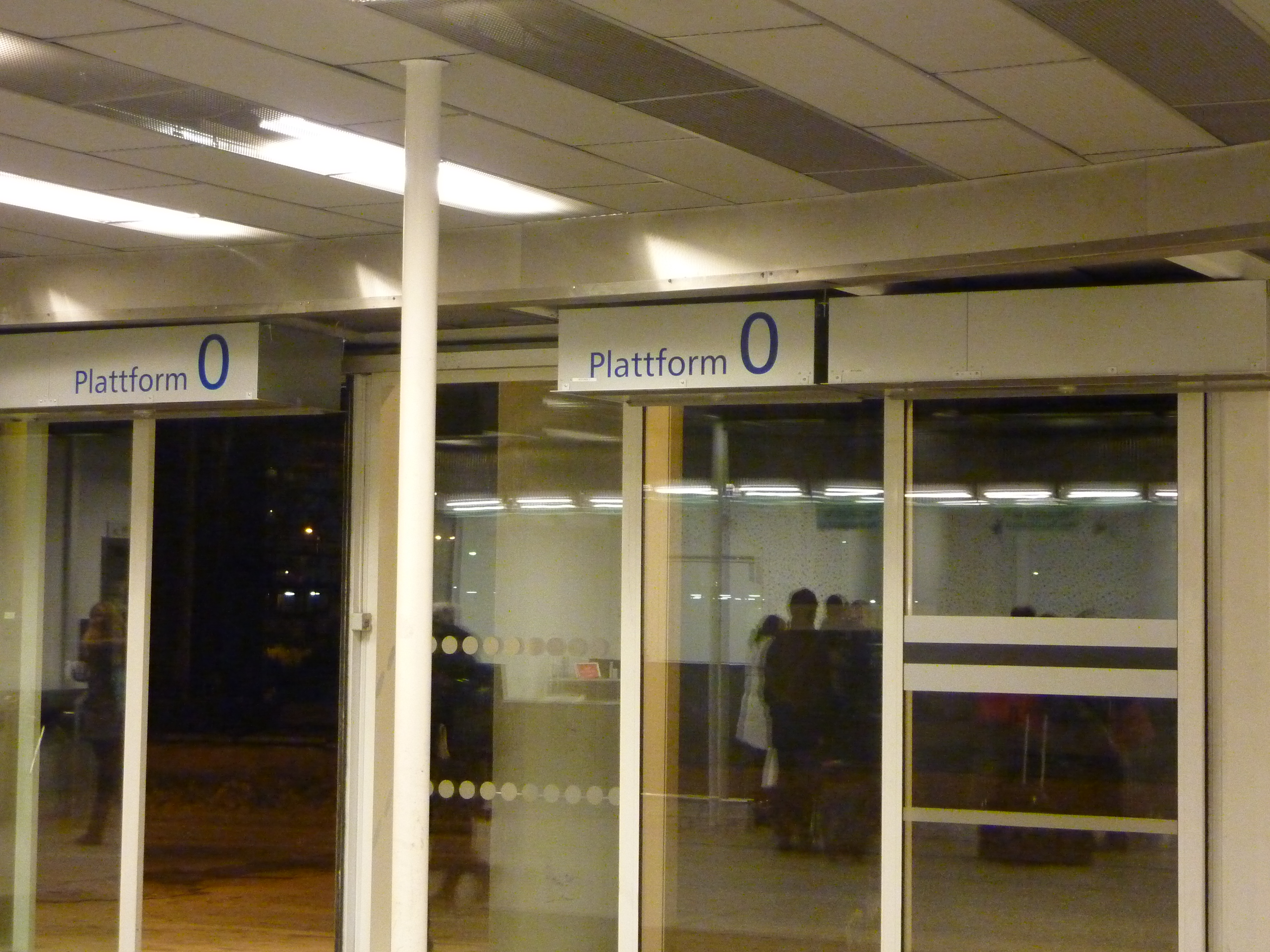
Oslo airport train station, Platform 0

This diagram illustrates different types of platform. Platform 1 is a "bay" platform, while platforms 2, 3 and 4 are "through" platforms. The platform accommodating 3 and 4 is an "island" platform

Platform types include the bay platform, side platform (also called through platform), split platform and island platform. A bay platform is one at which the track terminates, i.e. a dead-end or siding. Trains serving a bay platform must reverse in or out. A side platform is the more usual type, alongside tracks where the train arrives from one end and leaves towards the other. An island platform has through platforms on both sides; it may be indented on one or both ends, with bay platforms. To reach an island platform there may be a bridge, a tunnel, or a level crossing. A variant on the side platform is the spanish solution which has platforms on both sides of a single through track.

Modern station platforms can be constructed from a variety of materials such as glass-reinforced polymer, pre-cast concrete or expanded polystrene, depending on the underlying substructure.

== Identification ==
Most stations have their platforms numbered consecutively from 1; a few stations, including Cardiff Central, Haymarket, King's Cross, Stockport, and Gravesend (in the UK); and Lidcombe, Sydney (Australia), start from 0, generally because a new platform has been added next to Platform 1. At Bristol Temple Meads platforms 3 through to 12 are split along their length, with odd numbered platforms facing north and east and even numbers facing south and west, with a small signal halfway along the platform. Some, such as London Waterloo East, use letters instead of numbers (this is to distinguish the platforms from numbered ones in the adjoining Waterloo main-line station; some, such as Paris-Gare de Lyon, use letters for one group of platforms but numbers for the other.

The actual meaning of the word platform depends on country and language. In some countries such as the United States, the word platform refers to the physical structure, while the place where a train can arrive is referred to as a "track" (e.g. "The train is arriving on Track 5"). In other countries, such as the UK, Ireland and most Commonwealth countries, platform refers specifically to the place where the train stops, which means that in such a case island platforms are allocated two separate numbers, one for each side. Some countries are in the process of switching from platform to track numbers, i.e. the Czech Republic and Poland. In locations where track numbers are used, an island platform would be described as one platform with two tracks. Many stations also have numbered tracks which are used only for through traffic and do not have physical platform access.

== Facilities ==
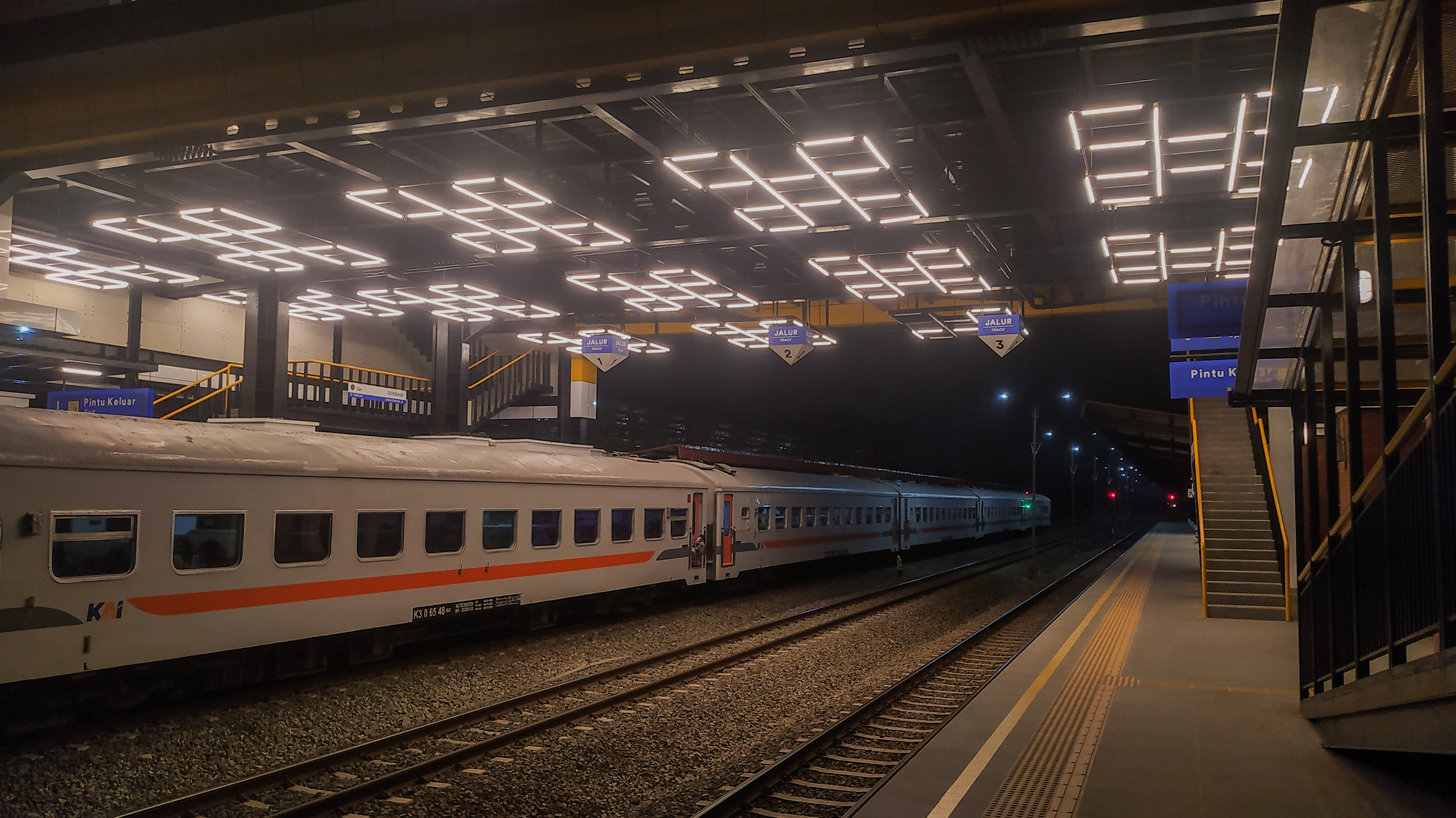
Station in Indonesia, where the station provides a crossing staircase between platforms for passengers.

Some of the station facilities are often located on the platforms. Where the platforms are not adjacent to a station building, often some form of shelter or waiting room is provided, and employee cabins may also be present. The weather protection offered varies greatly, from little more than a roof with open sides, to a closed room with heating or air-conditioning. There may be benches, lighting, ticket counters, drinking fountains, shops, trash boxes, and static timetables or dynamic displays with information about the next train.

There are often loudspeakers as part of a public address (PA) system. The PA system is often used where dynamic timetables or electronic displays are not present. A variety of information is presented, including destinations and times (for all trains, or only the more important long-distance trains), delays, cancellations, platform changes, changes in routes and destinations, the number of carriages in the train and the location of first class or luggage compartments, and supplementary fee or reservation requirements.

== Safety ==
Some metro stations have platform screen doors between the platforms and the tracks. They provide more safety, and they allow the heating or air conditioning in the station to be separated from the ventilation in the tunnel, thus being more efficient and effective. They have been installed in most stations of the Singapore MRT and the Hong Kong MTR, and stations on the Jubilee Line Extension in London.

Platforms should be sloped upwards slightly towards the platform edge to prevent wheeled objects such as trolleys, prams and wheelchairs from rolling away and into the path of the train. Many platforms have a cavity underneath an overhanging edge so that people who may fall off the platform can seek shelter from incoming trains.

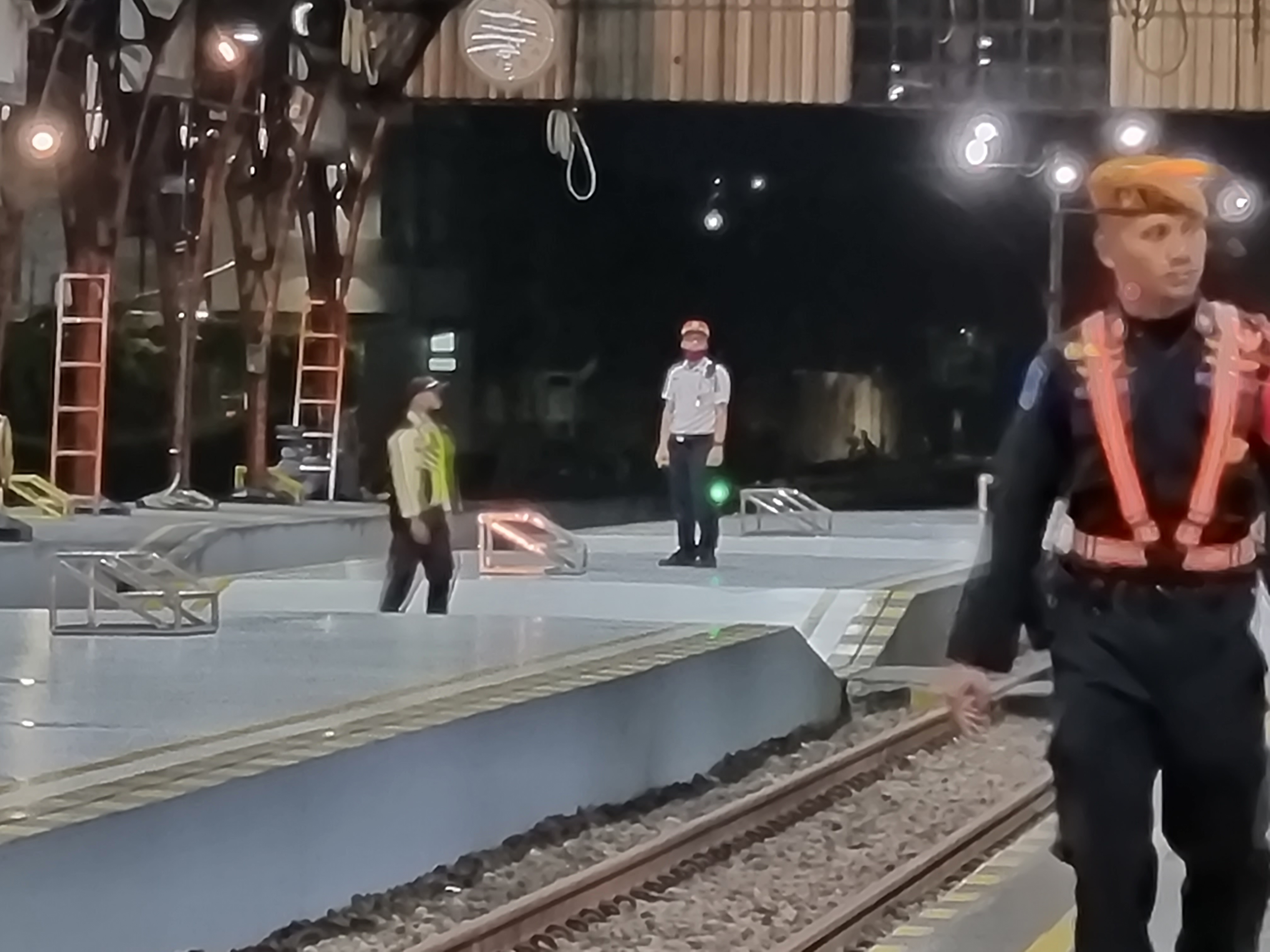
A railway guard (wearing a beret) on a station platform in Indonesia

For security against theft or to secure stowaways, some countries have special security officers stationed at stations, similar to police officers, but specifically for railways. For instance, in Indonesia and Poland, there are special railway security officers.

=== High-speed rail ===
A train passing at 240 km/h (150 mph) with induced airflow and debris which affected the videographer on the platform

In high-speed rail, passing trains are a significant safety problem as the safe distance from the platform edge increases with the speed of the passing train. A study done by the United States Department of Transportation in 1999 found that trains passing station platforms at speeds of 240 kilometres per hour (150 mph) can pose safety concerns to passengers on the platforms who are 2 metres (6.6 ft) away from the edge due to the aerodynamic effects created by pressure and induced airflow with speeds of 64 kilometres per hour (40 mph) to 95 kilometres per hour (59 mph) depending on the train body aerodynamic designs. Additionally, the airflow can cause debris to be blown out to the waiting passengers. If the passengers stand closer at 1 metre (3.3 ft), the risk increases with airflow that can reach speeds of 79 kilometres per hour (49 mph) to 116 kilometres per hour (72 mph).

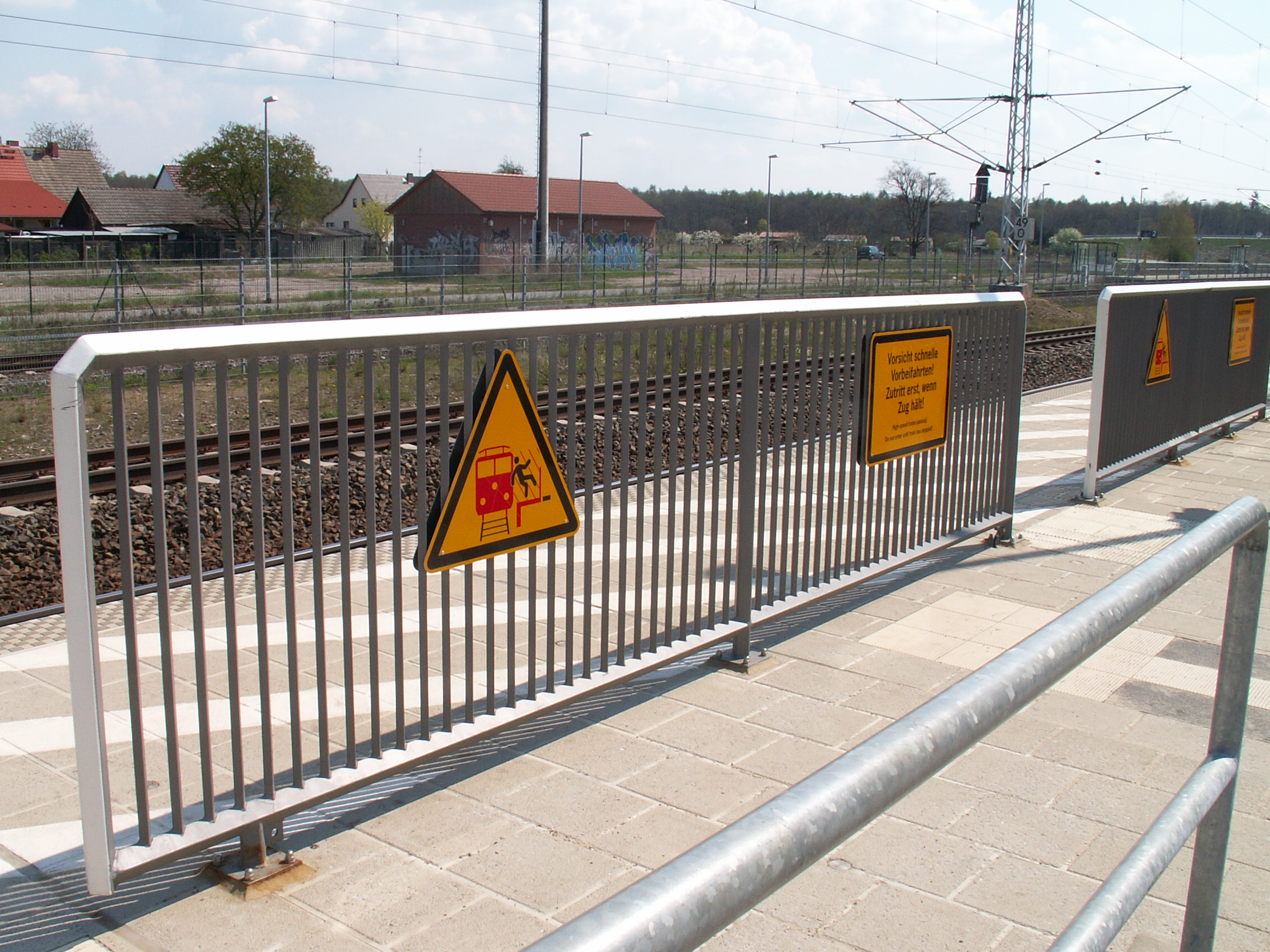
Platform barriers on the Berlin-Hamburg high speed line

In United Kingdom, a guideline for platform safety specifies that for the platforms with train passing speeds between 160 kilometres per hour (99 mph) and 200 kilometres per hour (120 mph), there should be a yellow-line buffer zone of 1.5 metres (4.9 ft) and other warning signs. If trains can pass at speeds higher than 200 kilometres per hour (120 mph), the platforms should be inaccessible to passengers unless there are waiting rooms or screened areas to provide protection. The European Union has a regulation for platforms that are close to tracks with train passing speeds of 250 kilometres per hour (160 mph) or more should not be accessible to passengers unless there is a lower speed limit for trains that intend to stop at the station or there are barriers to limit access.

=== Markings ===
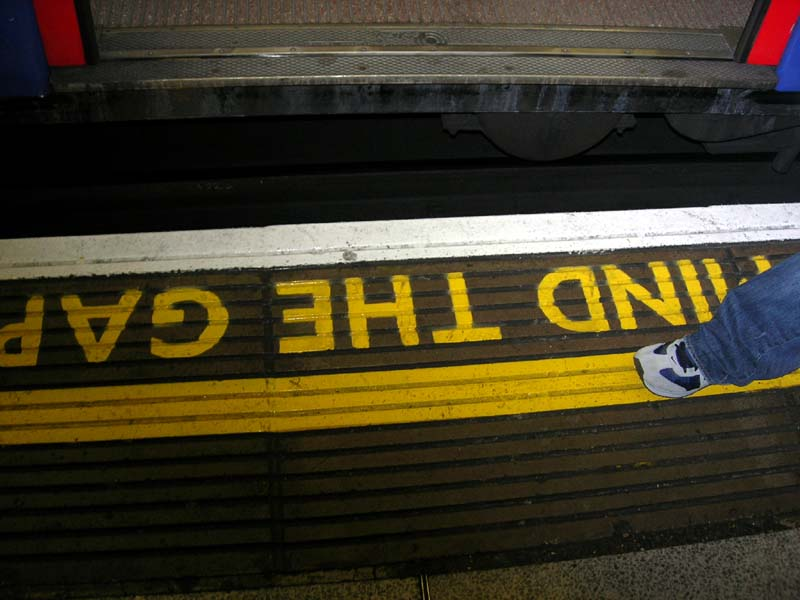
A common marking at curved platforms on the London Underground.

Platforms usually have some form of warnings or measures to keep passengers away from the tracks. The simplest measure is markings near the edge of the platform to demarcate the distance back that passengers should remain. Often a special tiled surface is used as well as a painted line, to help blind people using a walking aid, and help in preventing wheelchairs from rolling too near the platform edge.

In the US, Americans with Disabilities Act of 1990 regulations require a detectable warning strip 24 inches (61 cm) wide, consisting of truncated dome bumps in a visually-contrasting color, for the full length of the platform.

=== Curvature ===
Ideally platforms should be straight or slightly convex, so that the guard (if any) can see the whole train when preparing to close the doors. Platforms that have great curvature have blind spots that create a safety hazard. Mirrors or closed-circuit cameras may be used in these cases to view the whole platform. Also passenger carriages are straight, so doors will not always open directly onto a curved platform – often a platform gap is present. Usually such platforms will have warning signs, possibly auditory, such as London Underground's famous phrase "Mind the gap".

There may be moveable gap filler sections within the platform, extending once the train has stopped and retracting after the doors have closed. The New York City Subway employs these at 14th Street–Union Square on the IRT Lexington Avenue Line and at Times Square on the 42nd Street Shuttle, and formerly at the South Ferry outer loop station on the IRT Broadway–Seventh Avenue Line.

== Notable examples ==
=== Longest railway platforms ===
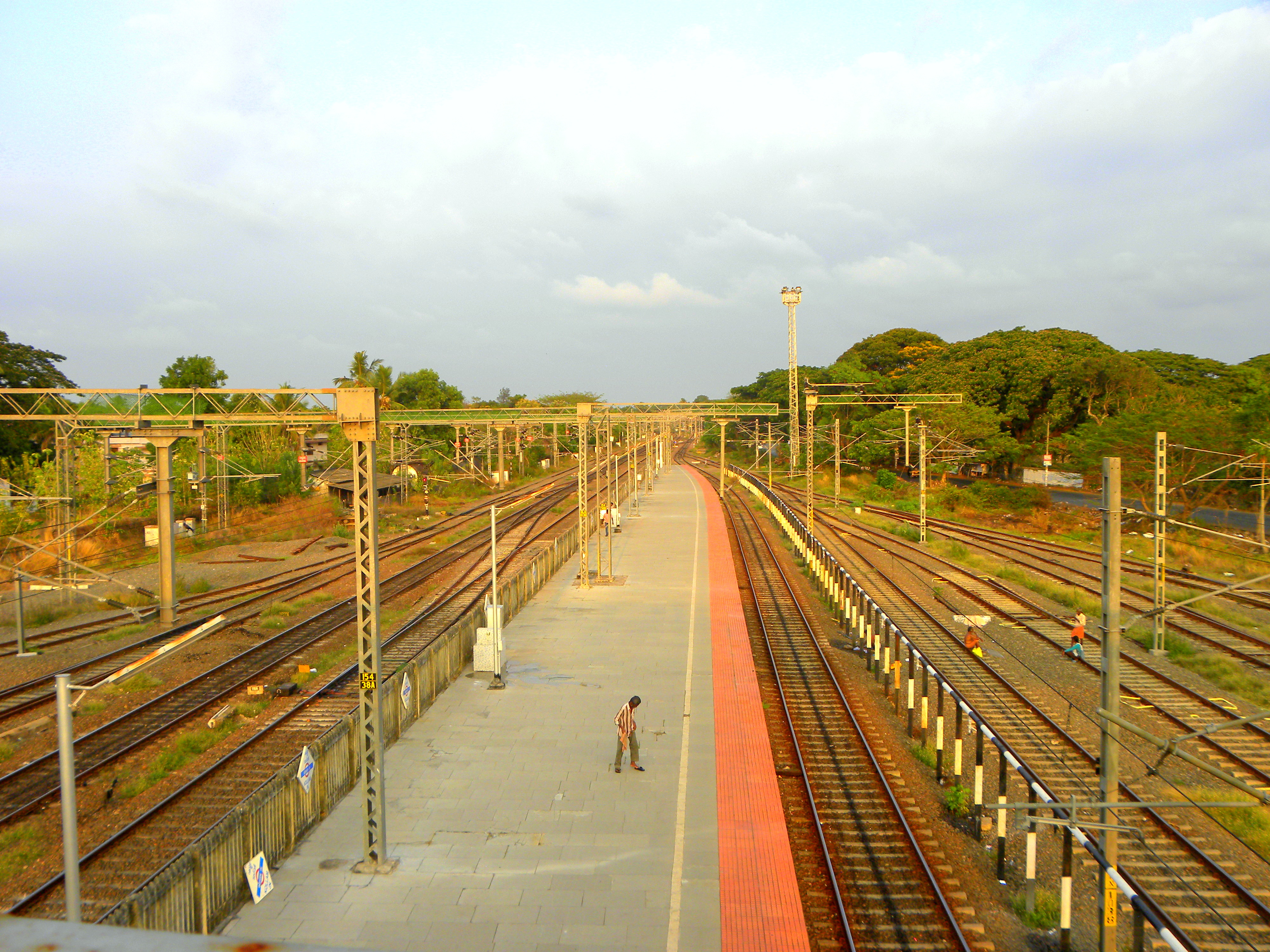
Eastern end of longest platform in Kollam Junction in India. It is the world's third longest railway platform.

1. Hubballi Junction, Karnataka, India: 1,505 metres (4,938 ft)
2. Gorakhpur Junction, Uttar Pradesh, India: 1,366.33 m (4,483 ft)
3. Kollam Junction, Kerala, India: 1,180.5 m (3,873 ft)
4. Kharagpur Junction, West Bengal, India: 1,072.5 m (3,519 ft)
5. State Street Subway, Chicago, Illinois, US, 1,067.1 m (3,501 ft)
6. Rayagada, Odisha, India 910 m (2986 ft)
7. Pilibhit Junction, Uttar Pradesh India 855 m (2,805 ft)
8. Auto Club Speedway station, Fontana, California, US: 2,675 ft (815 m)
9. Bilaspur, Chhattisgarh, India: 802 m (2,631 ft)
10. Cheriton Shuttle Terminal, Kent, United Kingdom: 791 m (2,595 ft) (longest in Europe)
11. Bern, Bern, Switzerland: 785 m (2,575 ft)
12. Jhansi, Uttar Pradesh, India: 770 m (2,526 ft)
13. Dearborn Street subway, Chicago, Illinois, US 762 m (2,500 ft)
14. Sonpur Junction, Sonepur, Bihar, India: 738 m (2,421 ft)
15. Nabadwip Dham, Nadia district, West Bengal, India 720 m (2,362 ft)
16. Flinders Street railway station, Melbourne, Victoria, Australia: 708 m (2,323 ft)
17. Port Pirie (Mary Elie Street) railway station, South Australia: 701 m (2,300 ft)
18. Sittard railway station, Netherlands: 700 m (2,297 ft)
19. 's-Hertogenbosch railway station, Netherlands: 699 m (2,293 ft)
20. Nijmegen, Netherlands: 699 m (2,293 ft)

=== Greatest number of platforms ===
1. Grand Central Terminal, New York City, US: 44
2. Ōsaka / Umeda Station, Japan: 36
3. Gare du Nord, Paris, France: 35 (31 above ground level + 4 underground)
4. Shinjuku Station, Tokyo, Japan: 35
5. Munich Central Station, Germany: 34 (32 above ground level + 2 underground)
6. London Waterloo station, United Kingdom: 32 (24 mainline and 8 at Waterloo tube station)
7. Frankfurt (Main) Hauptbahnhof, Germany: 31 (24 above ground level + 7 underground)
8. Chicago Union Station, US: 30
9. Zhengzhou East, China: 30
10. Tokyo Station, Japan: 30
11. Howrah, India : 28 (24 for the railway station and 4 for Howrah metro station)
12. Nagoya Station, Japan: 27
13. Central railway station, Sydney, Australia: 26 (22 above ground level + 4 underground)
14. Zürich Hauptbahnhof, Switzerland: 26 (16 above ground level + 10 underground)
15. Krung Thep Aphiwat Central Terminal (Bang Sue Grand Central), Bangkok, Thailand: 26 (24 for the railway station and 2 for MRT Blue Line, 12 platforms are currently out of use)
16. Ueno Station, Tokyo, Japan: 25
17. Kyoto Station, Japan: 25
18. Sealdah, India: 25 (21 for the railway station and 4 for Sealdah metro station)
19. Leipzig Hauptbahnhof, Germany: 24

== See also ==
- Berne gauge – Railway loading gauge considered the standard in most of Europe
- Gauntlet track
- Glossary of rail transport terms
- Harrington Hump – Railway platform elevation method
- Island platform – Railway platform placed between two railway tracks
- Loading dock
- Loading gauge – Maximum dimensions for railway vehicles and their loads
- Mind the gap – Warning to train passengers boarding and disembarking
- Platform gap – Space between a train car and the edge of the station platform
- Platform gap filler – Space between a train car and the edge of the station platform
- Railway platform height – Vertical distance between top of the platform and top of the rail
- Rail transport – Mode of transport
- Side platform – Railway platform with tracks along only one edge
- Spanish solution – Train station layout that uses both island and side platforms
- Split platform – Railway station with a platform for each track, but on different levels
- Structure gauge – Minimum clearance, height and width of railway infrastructure
