= Yasoba Station =

Railway station in Sakaide, Kagawa Prefecture, Japan

Y07 Yasoba Station 八十場駅
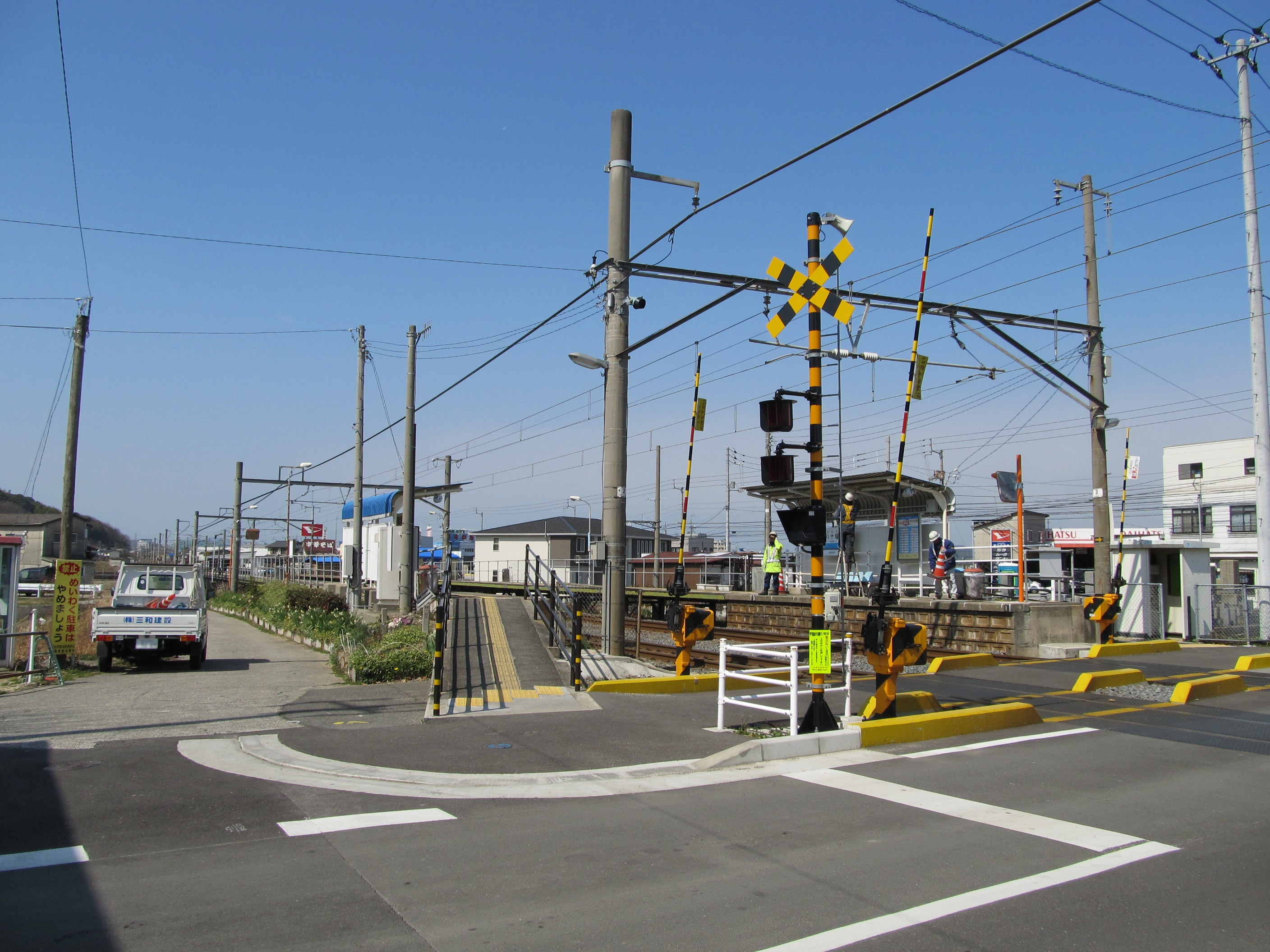
- Yasoba Station in 2011

General information
- Location: Nishinoshocho, Sakaide-shi, Kagawa-ken 762-0021; Japan
- Coordinates: 34°18′48″N 133°53′06″E
- Operator: JR Shikoku
- Line: ■ Yosan Line
- Distance: 18.6 km from Takamatsu
- Platforms: 2 side platforms
- Tracks: 2

Construction
- Structure type: At grade
- Cycle facilities: Designated parking place for bikes
- Accessible: Yes - ramps lead up to platforms

Other information
- Status: Unstaffed
- Station code: Y07

History
- Opened: 27 January 1952

Passengers
- FY2019: 112
Location
- Location within Kagawa Prefecture Location within Japan

Yasoba Station (八十場駅, Yasoba-eki) is a junction passenger railway station located in the city of Sakaide, Kagawa Prefecture, Japan. It is operated by JR Shikoku and has the station number "Y07".

== Lines ==
Yasoba Station is served by the JR Shikoku Yosan Line and is located 18.6 km from the beginning of the line at Takamatsu. Only local services stop at the station. In addition, although Tadotsu is the official start of the Dosan Line, some of its local trains start from and return to Takamatsu. These trains also stop at Yasoba.

== Layout ==
The station consists of two opposed side platforms serving two tracks. There is no station building but weather shelters are provided on both platforms for waiting passengers. The station is unstaffed but a "Tickets Corner" (small shelter housing an automatic ticket vending machine) is installed. Ramps lead up to each platform from the access road. There is no direct link between the platforms. A road level crossing at the end of the ramps is used to cross from one platform to the other. A designated parking space for bicycles is provided near the station.

== Adjacent stations ==
«	Service	»
Yosan Line
Limited Express Uzushio: Does not stop at this station
Rapid Marine Liner: Does not stop at this station
Rapid Sun Port: Does not stop at this station
Rapid Nanpū Relay: Does not stop at this station
Kamogawa	Local	Sakaide
Dosan Line
Kamogawa	Local	Sakaide

== History ==
Yasoba Station opened on 27 January 1952 as an additional stop on the existing Yosan Line. At this time the station was operated by Japanese National Railways (JNR). With the privatization of JNR on 1 April 1987, control of the station passed to JR Shikoku.

== Surrounding area ==
- Japan National Route 11

== See also ==
- List of railway stations in Japan
