= Platform 0 =

Name of a number of railway platforms around the world

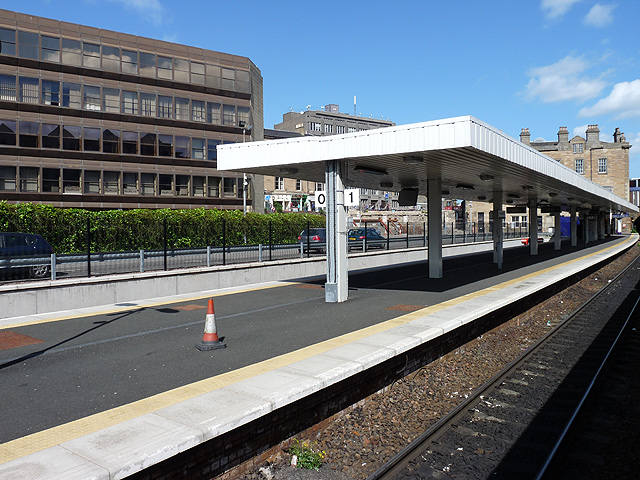
Platforms 0 and 1 at Edinburgh Haymarket

Platform 0 is a platform number at various railway stations around the world. It is usually a result of constructing a new platform next to the existing platform 1. To avoid the cost of having to renumber and replace signage (and aspects of the signalling system) for all other platforms, as well as confusing passengers who are familiar with the existing platform layout, the new platform is simply named "Platform 0" in an example of zero-based numbering.

== Examples ==
=== United Kingdom ===
The following stations in the United Kingdom have a Platform 0; this is not necessarily an exhaustive list:

- Bradford Forster Square
- Cardiff Central
- Doncaster
- Edinburgh Haymarket
- Gravesend
- Leeds
- London King's Cross
- Rainham
- Redhill
- Stockport

=== Australia ===
- Lidcombe

=== Japan ===
- Ayase
- Haruda
- Hashioka
- Kitakami
- Kumamoto
- Kyōto
- Matsumoto
- Toba
- Yotsukaidō

=== Switzerland ===
- Aarau

=== Indonesia ===
- Tanah Abang (from 2024)

=== Denmark ===
- Esbjerg

== See also ==
- Platform 9¾
