= Sanuki-Fuchū Station =

Railway station in Sakaide, Kagawa Prefecture, Japan

Y05 Sanuki-Fuchū Station 讃岐府中駅
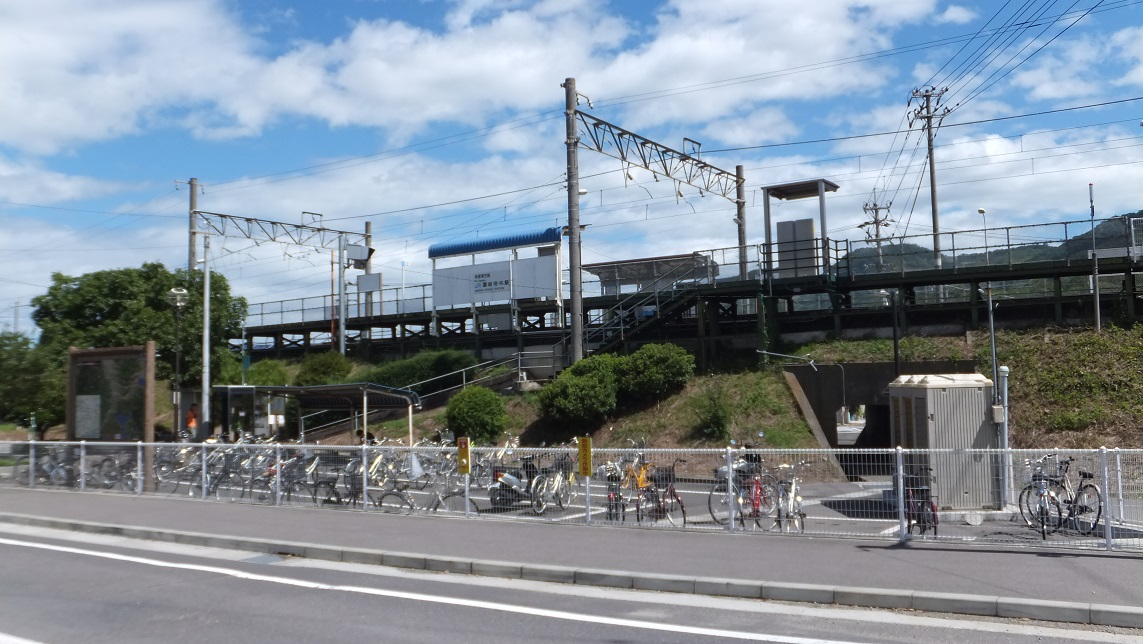
- Sanuki-Fuchū in 2015

General information
- Location: Fuchucho, Sakaide-shi, Kagawa-ken 762-0024; Japan
- Coordinates: 34°17′30″N 133°55′27″E
- Operator: JR Shikoku
- Line: ■ Yosan Line
- Distance: 14.2 km from Takamatsu
- Platforms: 2 side platforms
- Tracks: 2

Construction
- Structure type: Embankment
- Cycle facilities: Designated parking place for bikes
- Accessible: No - steps lead up to platforms

Other information
- Status: Unstaffed
- Station code: Y05

History
- Opened: 27 January 1952

Passengers
- FY2019: 323
Location
- Location within Kagawa Prefecture Location within Japan

Sanuki-Fuchū Station (讃岐府中駅, Sanuki-Fuchū-eki) is a junction railway station located in the city of Sakaide, Kagawa Prefecture, Japan. It is operated by JR Shikoku and has the station number "Y05".

== Lines ==
Sanuki-Fuchū Station is served by the JR Shikoku Yosan Line and is located 14.2 km from the beginning of the line at Takamatsu. Only local services stop at the station. In addition, although Tadotsu is the official start of the Dosan Line, some of its local trains start from and return to Takamatsu. These trains also stop at Sanuki-Fuchū.

== Layout ==
The station, which is unstaffed, consists of two opposed side platforms serving two tracks on an embankment. There is no station building but weather shelters are provided on both platforms for waiting passengers. Flights of steps lead up to each platform from ground level. Access to the opposite platform is by means of a pedestrian tunnel under the embankment. A designated parking space for bicycles is provided near the station.

== Adjacent stations ==
«	Service	»
Yosan Line
Limited Express Uzushio: Does not stop at this station
Rapid Marine Liner: Does not stop at this station
Rapid Sun Port: Does not stop at this station
Rapid Nanpū Relay: Does not stop at this station
Kokubu	Local	Kamogawa
Dosan Line
Kokubu	Local	Kamogawa

== History ==
Sanuki-Fuchū Station opened on 27 January 1952 as an additional stop on the existing Yosan Line. At this time the station was operated by Japanese National Railways (JNR). With the privatization of JNR on 1 April 1987, control of the station passed to JR Shikoku.

== Surrounding area ==
- Lake Fuchu
- School for Special Needs Education, Faculty of Education, Kagawa University

== See also ==
- List of railway stations in Japan
