= Sakaide Station =

Railway station in Sakaide, Kagawa Prefecture, Japan

Y08 Sakaide Station 坂出駅
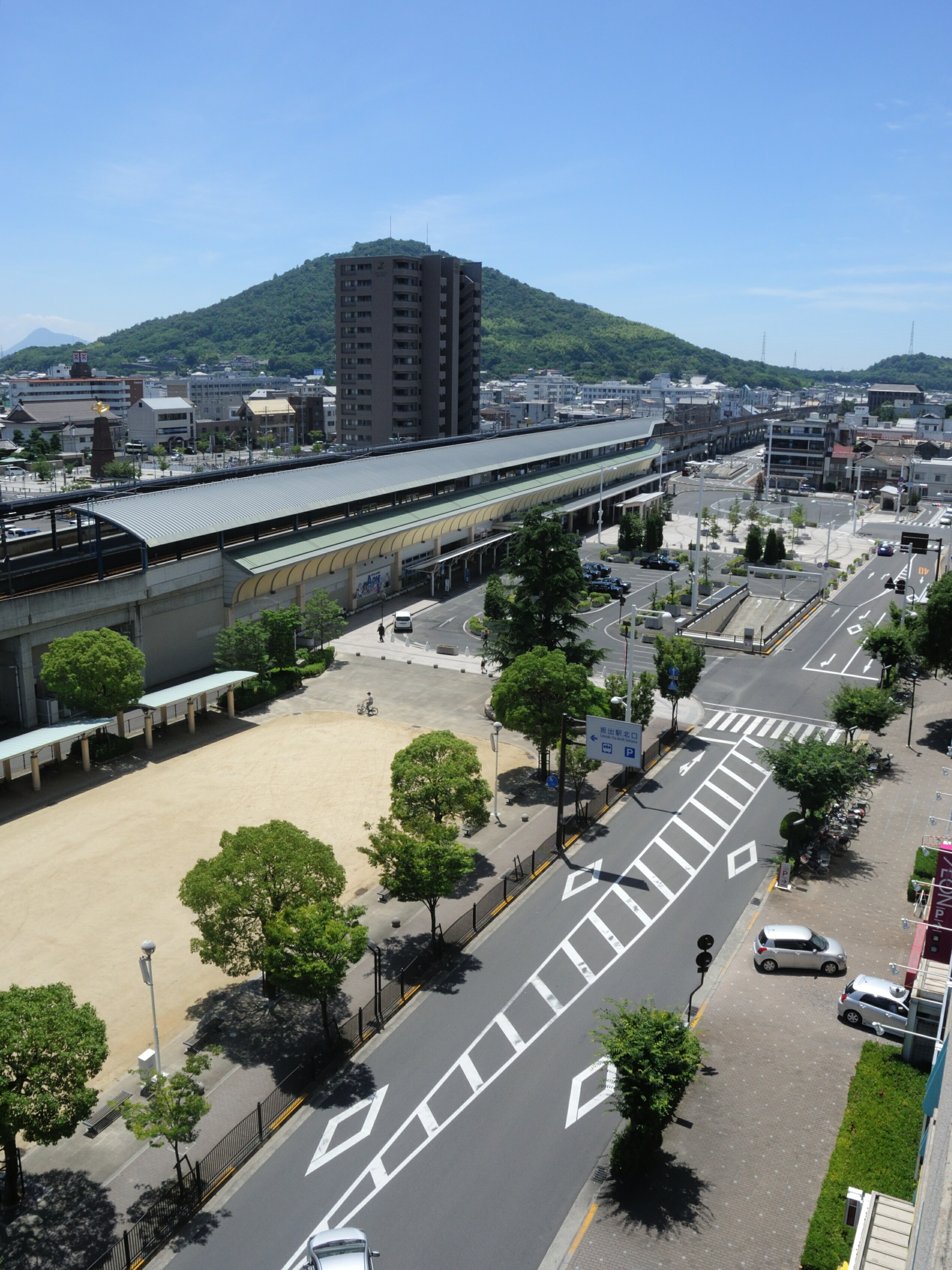
- Station building in July 2013

General information
- Location: 1-1-1, Motomachi, Sakaide-shi, Kagawa-ken 762-0045; Japan
- Coordinates: 34°18′47.6″N 133°51′22.77″E
- System: staffed
- Operator: JR Shikoku
- Line: ■ Yosan Line
- Platforms: 2 islands 3 tracks
- Connections: Bus terminal

Construction
- Structure type: elevated

Other information
- Status: Staffed (Midori no Madoguchi )
- Station code: Y08

History
- Opened: 21 February 1897

Passengers
- FY2023: 4,801
Location
- Location within Kagawa Prefecture Location within Japan

Sakaide Station (坂出駅, Sakaide-eki) is a junction railway station located in the city of Sakaide, Kagawa Prefecture, Japan. It is operated by JR Shikoku and has the station number "Y08".

== Lines ==
Sakaide Station is served by the JR Shikoku Yosan Line and is located 21.3 km from the beginning of the line at Takamatsu. Limited express trains other than 'Uzushio' that arrive at and depart from Okayama, local trains, rapid trains, and sleeper limited express trains stop here. Since all four limited express trains of Uzushio run two round trips, the only limited express trains from Sakaide Station to Okayama Station are sleeper limited express trains. Limited express trains such as Ishizuchi bound for Matsuyama Station, Shimanto bound for Kochi Station, event trains, limited express trains that run early in the morning, etc. only stop in the Ehime/Kochi direction.

== Layout ==
The station consists of an elevated side platform and an elevated island Platform serving three tracks with the station building underneath. The station has a Midori no Madoguchi staffed ticket office.

== Adjacent stations ==
«	Service	»
JR Shikoku
Yosan Line
Limited Express Uzushio: Does not stop at this station
Takamatsu	Sleeper Limited Express Sunrise Seto	Kojima
Kamogawa	Rapid Marine Liner	Kojima
Kamogawa	Rapid Sun Port	Utazu
Yasoba	Local	Utazu

== History ==
Sakaide Station opened on 21 February 1897 as a station on the Sanuki Railway when the section between Takamatsu and Marugame opened. In 1904 the line became part of the Sanyo Railway, which was nationalized in 1906. With the privatization of Japanese National Railways (JNR) on 1 April 1987, control of the station passed to JR Shikoku.

== Surrounding area ==
- Sakaide City Hall
- Sakaide Station North Exit Underground Parking Lot
- Kagawa Prefectural Sakaide High School
- Sakaide Daiichi High School

== See also ==
- List of railway stations in Japan
