= Hashioka Station =

Railway station in Takamatsu, Kagawa Prefecture, Japan

Y03 Hashioka Station 端岡駅
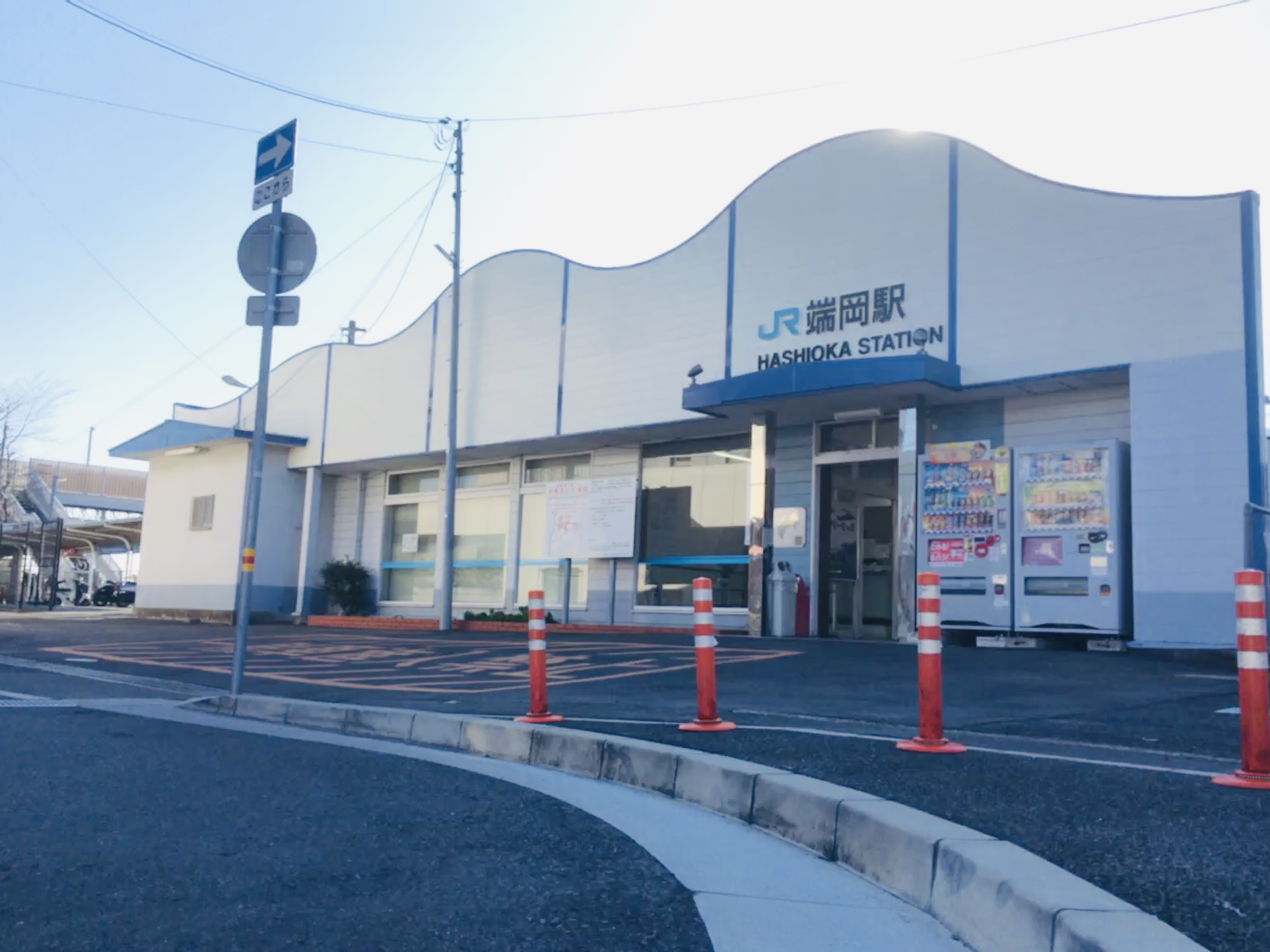
- Hashioka Station in 2020

General information
- Location: Kokubunjicho Nii, Takamatsu-shi, Kagawa-ken 769-0101; Japan
- Coordinates: 34°18′17″N 133°58′05″E
- Operator: JR Shikoku
- Line: ■ Yosan Line
- Distance: 9.5 km from Takamatsu
- Platforms: 1 side + 2 island platforms
- Tracks: 4 + 2 sidings

Construction
- Structure type: At grade
- Accessible: No - island platforms accessed by footbridge

Other information
- Status: Staffed - JR ticket window
- Station code: Y03

History
- Opened: 21 February 1897

Passengers
- FY2023: 1,204
Location
- Location within Kagawa Prefecture Location within Japan

Hashioka Station (端岡駅, Hashioka-eki) is a passenger railway station located in the city of Takamatsu, Kagawa Prefecture, Japan. It is operated by JR Shikoku and has the station number "Y03".

== Lines ==
The station is served by the JR Shikoku Yosan Line and is located 9.5 km from the beginning of the line at Takamatsu. Yosan line local, Rapid Sunport, and Nanpū Relay services stop at the station. The Marine Liner rapid service on the Seto-Ohashi Line between Okayama and Takamatsu also stop at the station. Although Tadotsu is the official start of the Dosan Line, some of its local trains start from and return to Takamatsu. These trains also stop at Hashioka.

== Layout ==
Hashioka Station consists of a side platform and two staggered island platforms serving four tracks. The side platform, attached to the station building is designated platform 0. Track 1 is served by both platform 0 and platform 1 (island) and trains stopping there occasionally open their doors on both sides to allow passengers to quickly get from the island platform to the station building. Platforms 1 and 2 serve eastbound trains while platforms 3 and 4 serve westbound ones. A station building houses a waiting room and a JR ticket window (without a Midori no Madoguchi facility). Access to the island platforms is by means of two footbridges, one for each island. Two sidings branch of off the main tracks on either side.

== Adjacent stations ==
«	Service	»
Yosan Line
Limited Express Uzushio: Does not stop at this station
Kinashi	Rapid Sunport	Kokubu
Kinashi	Rapid Nanpū Relay	Kokubu
Kinashi	Local	Kokubu
Dosan Line
Kinashi	Local	Kokubu
Seto-Ōhashi Line
Kinashi	Rapid Marine Liner	Kokubu

== History ==
Hashioka Station opened on 21 February 1897 as an intermediate stop when the track of the privately Sanuki Railway (later the Sanyo Railway) was extended from Marugame to Takamatsu. After the railway as nationalized on 1 December 1906, Japanese Government Railways (JGR) took over the station and operated it as part of the Sanuki Line (later the Sanyo and then the Yosan Main Line). With the privatization of Japanese National Railways (JNR, the successor of JGR) on 1 April 1987, control of the station passed to JR Shikoku.

== Surrounding area ==
- Takamatsu City Hall Kokubunji General Center
- Takamatsu City Kokubunji Junior High School
- Takamatsu Municipal Kokubunji Northern Elementary School

== See also ==
- List of railway stations in Japan
