= Kokubu Station (Kagawa) =

Railway station in Takamatsu, Kagawa Prefecture, Japan

Y04 Kokubu Station 国分駅
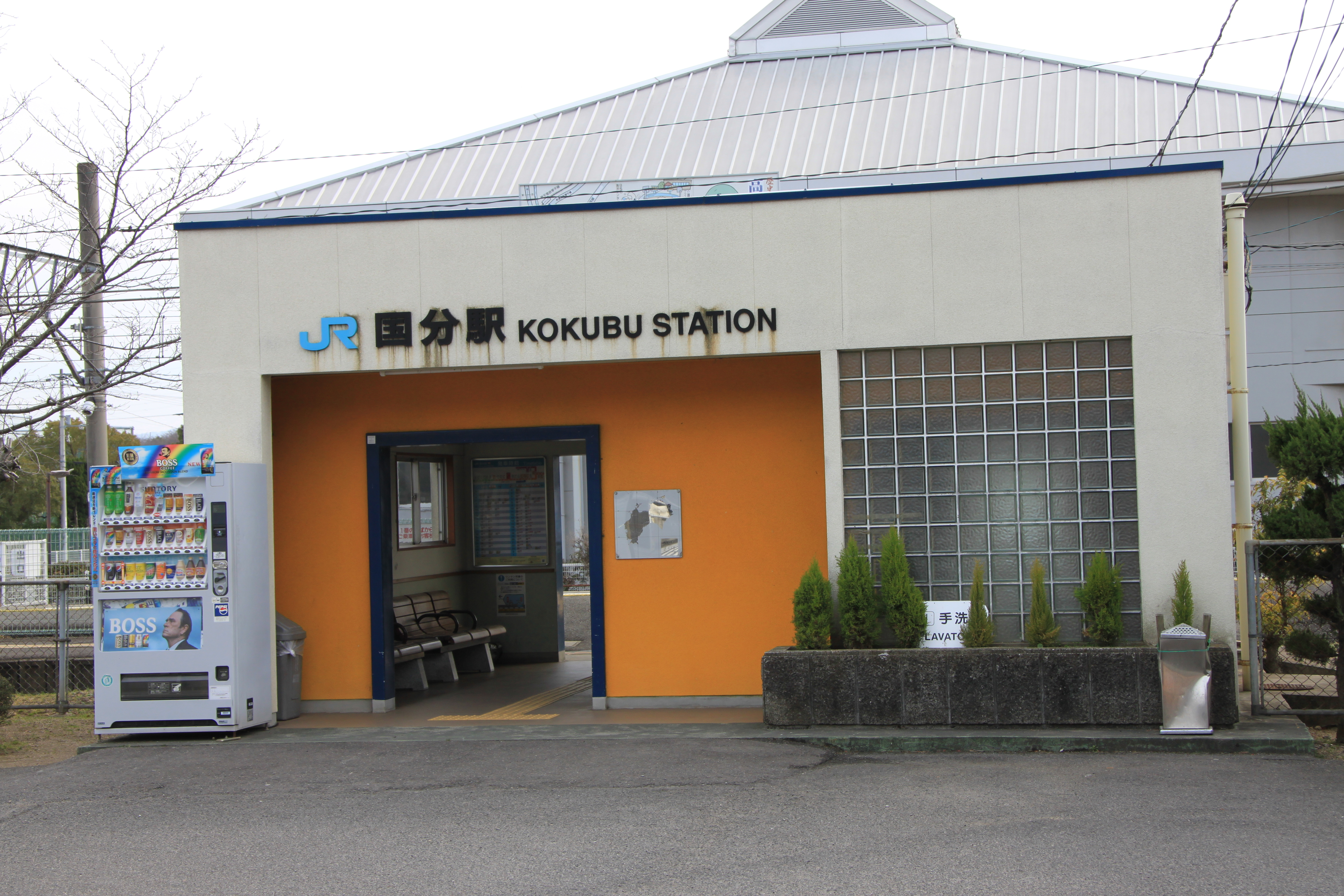
- Kokubu Station in 2011

General information
- Location: Kokubunjicho Kokubu, Takamatsu-shi, Kagawa-ken 769-0102; Japan
- Coordinates: 34°18′02″N 133°56′30″E
- Operator: JR Shikoku
- Line: ■ Yosan Line
- Distance: 11.9 km from Takamatsu
- Platforms: 2 side platforms
- Tracks: 2

Construction
- Structure type: At grade

Other information
- Status: Unstaffed
- Station code: Y04

History
- Opened: 21 February 1897

Passengers
- FY2019: 399
Location
- Location within Kagawa Prefecture Location within Japan

Kokubu Station (国分駅, Kokubu-eki) is a passenger railway station located in the city of Takamatsu, Kagawa Prefecture, Japan. It is operated by JR Shikoku and has the station number "Y04".

== Lines ==
The station is served by the JR Shikoku Yosan Line and is located 11.9 km from the beginning of the line at Takamatsu. Yosan line local, Rapid Sunport, and Nanpū Relay services stop at the station. Some trains of the Marine Liner rapid service on the Seto-Ohashi Line between Okayama and Takamatsu also stop at the station. Although Tadotsu is the official start of the Dosan Line, some of its local trains start from and return to Takamatsu. These trains also stop at Kokubu.

== Layout ==
Kokubu Station consists of two opposed side platforms serving two tracks. A concrete station building serve as a waiting room. Access to the opposite platform is by means of a footbridge. The station is unstaffed but a "Tickets Corner" (a small shelter housing an automatic ticket vending machine) is provided. In addition there is a siding serving a disused freight platform.

== Adjacent stations ==
«	Service	»
Yosan Line
Limited Express Uzushio: Does not stop at this station
Hashioka	Rapid Sunport	Kamogawa
Hashioka	Rapid Nanpū Relay	Kamogawa
Hashioka	Local	Sanuki-Fuchū
Dosan Line
Hashioka	Local	Sanuki-Fuchū
Seto-Ōhashi Line
Hashioka	Rapid Marine Liner	Kamogawa

== History ==
Kokubu Station opened on 21 February 1897 as an intermediate stop when the track of the privately Sanuki Railway (later the Sanyo Railway) was extended from Marugame to Takamatsu. After the railway as nationalized on 1 December 1906, Japanese Government Railways (JGR) took over the station and operated it as part of the Sanuki Line (later the Sanyo and then the Yosan Main Line). With the privatization of Japanese National Railways (JNR, the successor of JGR) on 1 April 1987, control of the station passed to JR Shikoku.

== Surrounding area ==
- Kagawa Prefectural Youth Center
- Sanuki Kokubun-ji Ruins

== See also ==
- List of railway stations in Japan
