= Tobe =

Tobe may refer to:

- Tobe, Ehime, a town in Japan
  - Tobe ware porcelain from Tobe, Ehime
- Tobe Hooper (1943–2017), American horror film director
- Tobe! Polystars arcade game
- Tobe Sexton (born 1968), American actor
- Tobe Station railway station in Japan
- Keiko Tobe (1957 – 2010), Japanese manga artist
- Kok Tobe Mountain in Almaty
- Makoto Tobe (戸辺 誠, born 1986), Japanese shogi player
- Naoto Tobe (born 1992), Japanese highjumper
- Sunaho Tobe (born 1972), Japanese illustrator
- Tobe Watson (born 1997), Australian footballer
- Tobe, a type of sari worn in Sudan
- Tobe (company), a Japanese talent agency

== See also ==
- To be, an English copula verb
- Toby, male given name
- Tomas Tobé Swedish politician
