= Hirota =

Hirota may refer to:

- Hirota (surname)
- Hirota, Ehime, a former village located in Iyo District, Ehime, Japan
- Hirota Station, a train station in Aizuwakamatsu, Fukushima Prefecture, Japan
- Hirota Shrine
