= Saragamine Renpō Prefectural Natural Park =

Prefectural Natural Park in Japan

- 皿ヶ嶺連峰県立自然公園
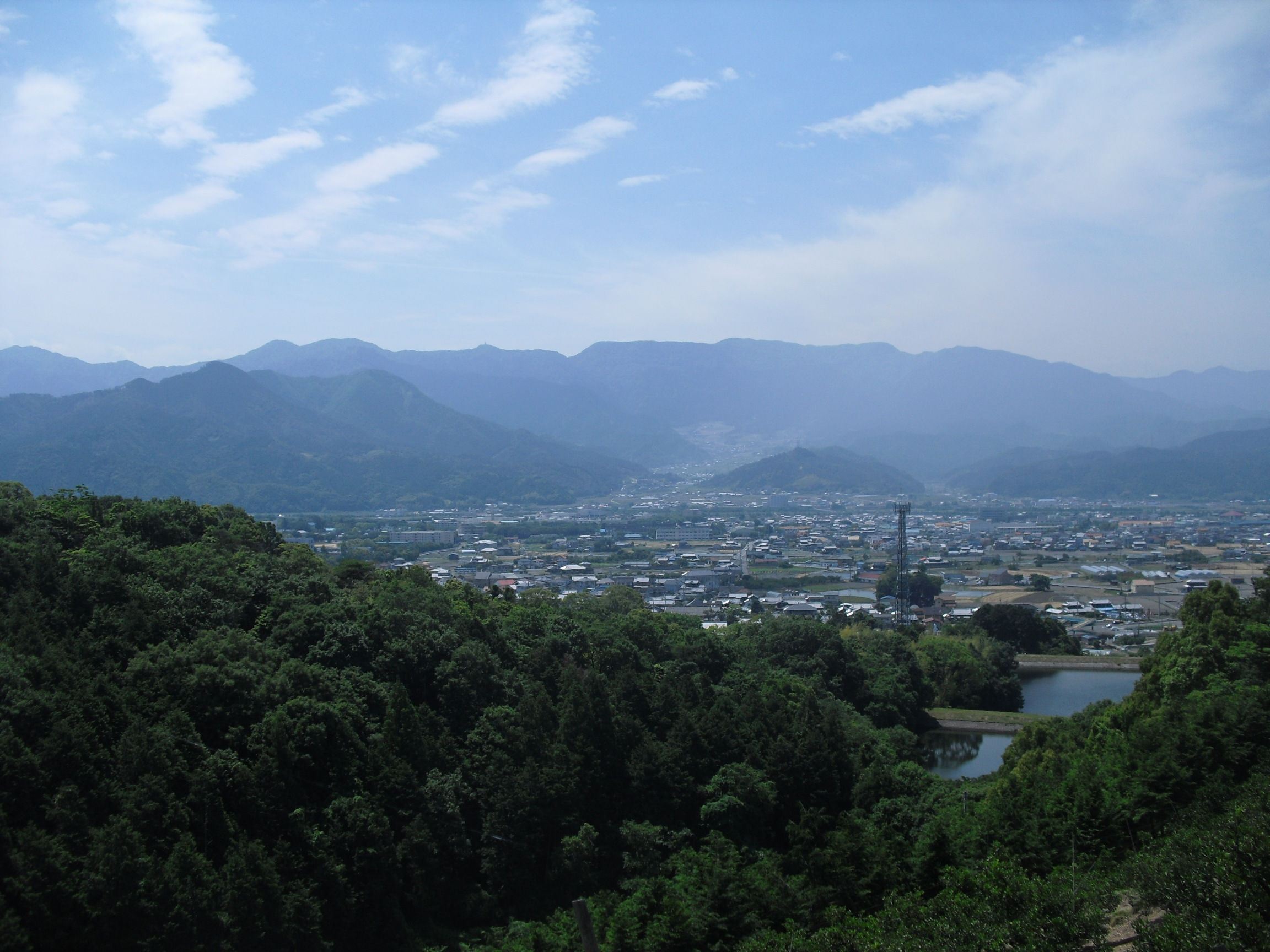
- Saragamine

- Location within Ehime Prefecture Location within Japan
- Location: Ehime Prefecture, Japan
- Nearest city: Iyo, Kumakōgen, Matsuyama, Tobe, Tōon
- Coordinates: 33°43′01″N 132°53′38″E
- Area: 30.95 square kilometres (11.95 sq mi)
- Established: 25 January 1967

Saragamine Renpō Prefectural Natural Park (皿ヶ嶺連峰県立自然公園, Saragamine Renpō kenritsu shizen-kōen) is a Prefectural Natural Park in Ehime Prefecture, Japan. Established in 1967, the park spans the borders of the municipalities of Iyo, Kumakōgen, Matsuyama, Tobe, and Tōon. The park's central feature is the eponymous Saragamine mountain range, Mount Saragamine itself lying at the western end of the Ishizuchi Mountains.

== See also ==
- National Parks of Japan
- Ishizuchi Quasi-National Park
