= List of Intangible Cultural Properties of Japan (Ehime) =

This list is of the Intangible Cultural Properties of Japan in the Prefecture of Ehime.

== National Cultural Properties ==
As of 1 July 2015, zero Important Intangible Cultural Properties have been designated.

== Prefectural Cultural Properties ==
As of 27 March 2015, two properties have been designated at a prefectural level.

=== Martial Arts ===
Property	Holder	Comments	Image	Ref.
Ōzu Shinden Ryū Style of Swimming 大洲神伝流泳法; Ōzu shinden-ryū eihō	Shūme Shindenryū Preservation Society (主馬神伝流保存会)	swimming with weapons, dating from the early seventeenth century		

=== Craft Techniques ===
Property	Holder	Comments	Image	Ref.
Tobe-yaki 砥部焼; Tobe-yaki	Sakai Yoshimi (酒井芳美), Kudō Shōji (工藤省治)	blue and white porcelain tradition dating from the 1770s		

== Municipal Cultural Properties ==
As of 1 May 2014, nine properties have been designated at a municipal level.

== Intangible Cultural Properties that need measures such as making records ==
As of 1 July 2015, there was one Intangible Cultural Property that needs measures such as making records (記録作成等の措置を講ずべき無形文化財).

=== Craft Techniques ===
Property	Holder	Comments	Image	Ref.
Senka-shi 泉貨紙; Senka-shi		type of mulberry paper dating from the Sengoku period; after the war there were thirty practitioners, by 1965 four, and by 1968 only Kikuchi Sadashige (菊地定重)		
