= Kinshako Prefectural Natural Park =

Natural park of Ehime prefecture, Japan

Coordinates: 33°56′17″N 133°33′14″E

- 金砂湖県立自然公園
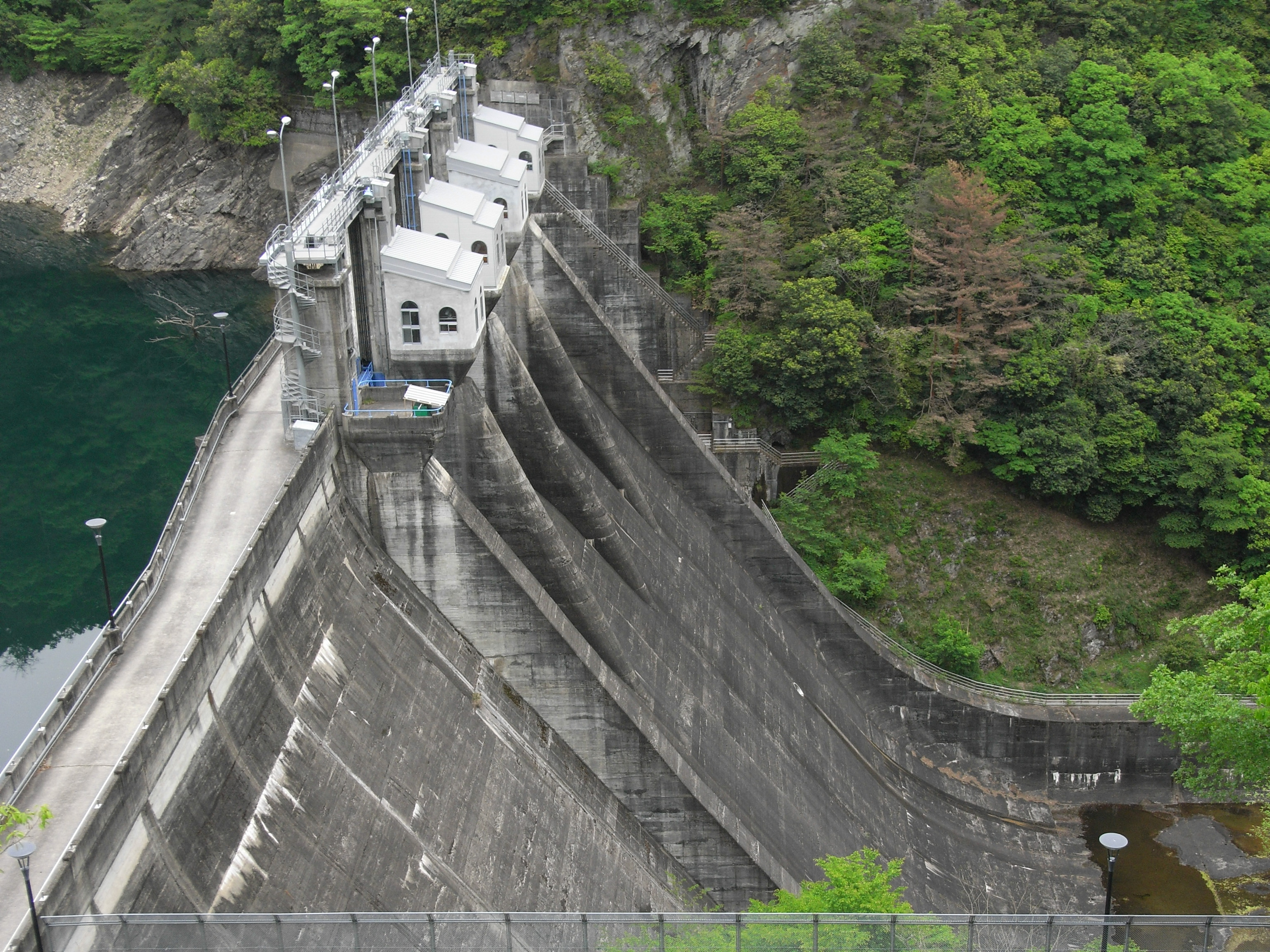
- Yanase Dam
- Interactive map of Kinshako Prefectural Natural Park
- Location: Ehime Prefecture, Japan
- Nearest city: Shikokuchūō
- Area: 9.8 square kilometres (3.8 sq mi)
- Established: 22 March 1961

Kinshako Prefectural Natural Park (金砂湖県立自然公園, Kinshako kenritsu shizen-kōen) is a Prefectural Natural Park in northeast Ehime Prefecture, Japan. Established in 1961, the park is wholly situated within the municipality of Shikokuchūō. The park's central feature is the eponymous Lake Kinsha.

== See also ==
- National Parks of Japan
