= Shikoku Karst Prefectural Natural Park (Ehime) =

Natural park of Ehime prefecture, Japan

Coordinates: 33°30′04″N 132°57′18″E

- 四国カルスト県立自然公園
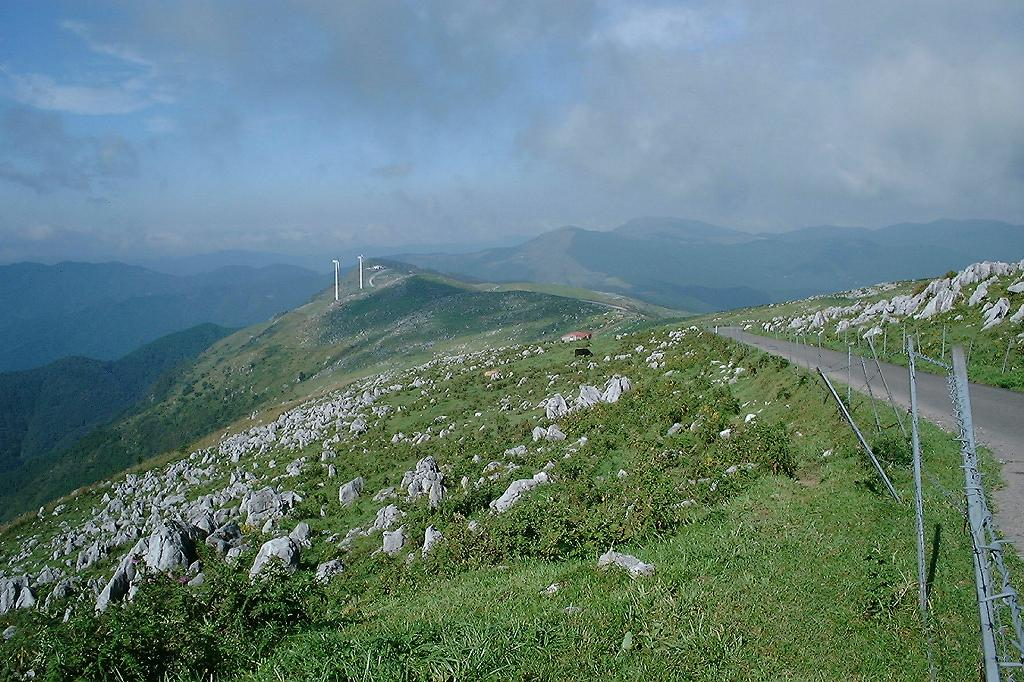
- Interactive map of Shikoku Karst Prefectural Natural Park
- Location: Ehime Prefecture, Japan
- Nearest city: Kumakōgen, Seiyo, Uchiko
- Area: 53.6 square kilometres (20.7 sq mi)
- Established: 21 March 1964

Shikoku Karst Prefectural Natural Park (四国カルスト県立自然公園, Shikoku Karusuto kenritsu shizen-kōen) is a Prefectural Natural Park in Ehime Prefecture, Japan.

== History ==
The National Park was established in 1964.

== Geography ==
The park is located in Kamiukiana-gun, and spans the borders of the municipalities of Kumakōgen, Seiyo, and Uchiko. It runs from the Onogahara grasslands to the Jiyosa Pass, along the borders of Ehime and Kochi prefectures, and includes the Godan and Tengu plateaus. Mountainous grasslands cover the underlying limestone formations.

The main peaks in the area are Mt Oda and the Okawa Ridge.

== Geology ==
The park's central feature is the eponymous Shikoku Karst plateau. This is one of the three major Karst (eroded limestone) formations in Japan

== Tourism ==
The roads through the park are popular for driving and touring, although there are traffic restrictions on the roads during the winter.

The park is famous for its grasslands, and blooming Azalea bushes.

== Access ==
The park is 1 hour and 20 minutes by car from the Suzaki Higashi Interchange on the Kōchi Expressway.

== See also ==
- National Parks of Japan
- Karst
