= Performance calligraphy =

Calligraphy combined with music and dance

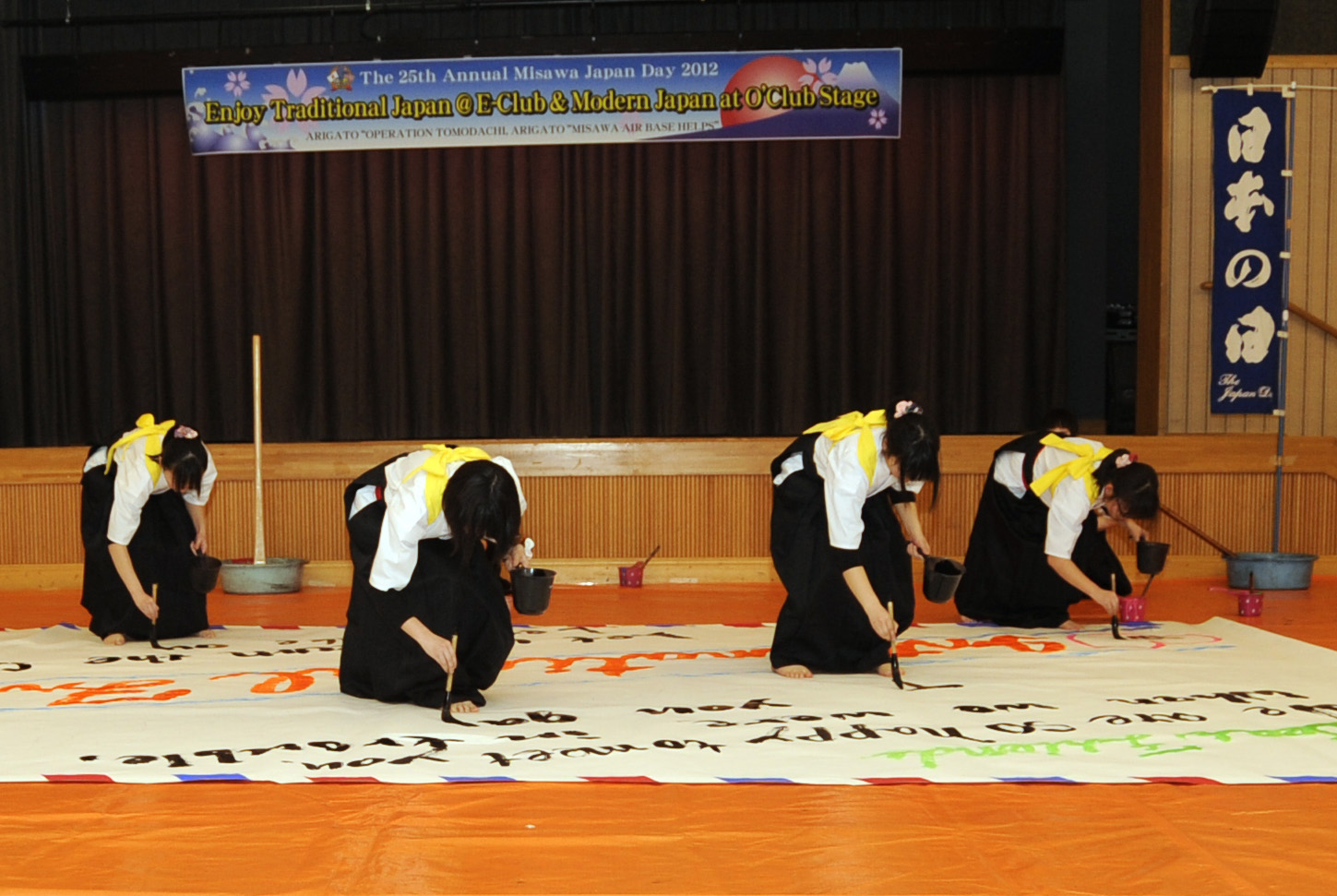
Japanese students perform a calligraphy dance at Misawa Air Base, Japan, in April 2012.

Performance calligraphy (書道パフォーマンス) is a kind of Japanese calligraphy combining traditional calligraphy with J-pop music and dance. It is a team activity, performed on large canvases. Performance calligraphy is gaining popularity amongst young Japanese, especially high-school students. Several high schools in Japan offer performance calligraphy as a club activity.

== Outline ==
A variety of different brushes are used in performance calligraphy, some almost 130 cm long. It is performed on large canvases, sometimes as much as ten meters long and five meters wide. In the vast majority of cases it is performed by women, and performers usually wear traditional Japanese hakama. Performance calligraphy requires strength and stamina, and the training for it can be tough. At Matsuyama Girls High School in Saitama Prefecture, students practice for four hours each day, and it is common for beginners to have muscle pain.

== History ==
Performance calligraphy was conceived by Kenji Kiyohara, an adviser to the calligraphy club of Seihō High School in Buzen, Fukuoka Prefecture. The club first demonstrated the new style of calligraphy in 1993 at a hotel function celebrating their national title victory at the International High School Shodō Exhibition. At that time, the performance was done without music. The first time the calligraphy club combined music with their performance was in 1998, when they appeared on the TV Asahi program Zenkoku Kōkōsei Bunka Matsuri Grand Prix, with their performance choreographed to Da Pump's debut song Feelin' Good (It's Paradise). At the time, the students called it karaoke shodō (karaoke calligraphy); it only became known as performance shodō (performance calligraphy) later. The TV Asahi performance resulted in nationwide interest in performance calligraphy.

== Shodō Performance Kōshien ==
In Japan there is a national tournament dedicated to performance calligraphy, called the Shodō Performance Kōshien. It was proposed by Kazutaka Hattori, then a calligraphy club advisor at Mishima High School, in Shikokuchūō, Ehime Prefecture The tournament was first held in Shikokuchūō in 2008, with three high schools participating and an audience of 300 people. The fourth Shodō Performance Kōshien in July 2011 saw fifteen schools participate, and an audience of 3,500 people.

Nippon Television's "Zoom-in!!Super" program featured a 9-minute segment on this competition on August 27, 2009. This segment received a respectable viewership rating of 10 percent despite its short air-time. Because of this show, the 2010 film Shodo Girls was produced using Shodō Performance Kōshien as its subject matter.

== Reception ==
According to the Asahi Shimbun newspaper, performance calligraphy has been criticized as "not calligraphy". The newspaper quotes an unnamed expert as saying, "In calligraphy there is a tradition of writing in public, so it is not rare to create calligraphy in front of people. However, in the present performances the influence of things outside calligraphy is too strong." On the other hand, the newspaper also says that many experts are of the opinion that the experience of performing can help calligraphy students in their more traditional work.

Performance calligraphy has been featured in Japanese popular media. It was the subject of the manga series Tomehane! Suzuri Kōkō Shodōbu, which was adapted into a television drama. It was also featured in the 2010 film Shodo Girls.
