= Hirota, Ehime =

Dissolved municipality in Ehime prefecture, Japan

Hirota (広田村, Hirota-mura) was a village located in Iyo District, Ehime Prefecture, Japan.

As of 2003, the village had an estimated population of 1,099 and a density of 24.77 persons per km^{2}. The total area was 44.37 km^{2}.

On January 1, 2005, Hirota was merged with the expanded town of Tobe and no longer exists as an independent municipality.
