= Matsuyama Shinonome College =

Coordinates: 33°49′56″N 132°47′47″E

- 松山東雲女子大学
- Type: Private
- Established: 1886
- President: Chieko Shiozaki
- Location: Matsuyama, Ehime, Japan
- Website: Official website

Matsuyama Shinonome College (松山東雲女子大学, Matsuyama shinonome joshi daigaku) is a private women's college in Matsuyama, Ehime Prefecture, Japan. The predecessor of the school was founded in 1886, and it was chartered as a university in 1992.
