= Asu no Hikari o Tsukame =

Japanese television drama series

- Genre: Drama
- Starring: First season: Alice Hirose; Mayo Kawasaki; Sachi Funaki; Yūya Shimizu; Second season: Fujiko Kojima; Naoyuki Morita; Yua Shinkawa; Mami Nishino
- Opening theme: Without You, by Jyongri (first season); Change Myself, by Yuka Masaki (second season)
- Country of origin: Japan
- Original language: Japanese
- No. of seasons: 2
- No. of episodes: 90

Production
- Production companies: Tōkai Television Broadcasting; MMJ

Original release
- Network: FNS (THK, Fuji TV)
- Release: July 5, 2010 – September 2, 2011

Asu no Hikari o Tsukame (明日の光をつかめ; "Seize the Light of Tomorrow") is a Japanese television drama series which first aired on Tokai TV in 2010.

== Cast ==
=== First season ===
- Alice Hirose
- Mayo Kawasaki
- Sachi Funaki
- Yūya Shimizu
- Ikkei Watanabe
- Shin Yazawa
- Ryōga Hayashi
- Tetsuji Sakakibara
- Naruki Matsukawa
- Erika Tonooka
- Reo Yoshitake

=== Second season ===
- Fujiko Kojima
- Naoyuki Morita
- Yua Shinkawa
- Mami Nishino
- Aiki Nishida
- Ibuki Shimizu
- Natsumi Ogawa
- Ren Mori
- Yuya Matsushita
- Honoka Miki
- Yasuhiro Arai
- Natsumi Nanase
- Yuria Kizaki
- Haruka Mano
- Reika Yamada
