= Ehime Prefectural University of Health Science =

Higher education institution in Ehime Prefecture, Japan

- 愛媛県立医療技術大学
- Former names: Founded as predecessor school in 1988
- Type: Public university
- Established: 2004
- Location: Tobe, Ehime Prefecture, Japan; 33.780238°N 132.797582°E

Ehime Prefectural University of Health Science (愛媛県立医療技術大学, Ehime kenritsu iryou gijutsu daigaku) is a public university in the town of Tobe, Ehime Prefecture, Japan. The predecessor of the school was founded in 1988, and it was chartered as a university in 2004.
