= Shodo Girls =

Shodo Girls: Watashitachi no Koshien
- Japanese film poster
- Directed by: Ryuichi Inomata
- Screenplay by: Yuko Nagata
- Produced by: Naoto Fujimura, Sakashita Teshiya
- Starring: Riko Narumi
- Cinematography: Masaaki Ichikawa
- Edited by: Toshiro Matsutake
- Music by: Taro Iwashiro
- Production company: NTV
- Distributed by: Warner Bros. Pictures
- Release date: 15 May 2010 (Japan)
- Running time: 120 minutes
- Country: Japan
- Language: Japanese
- Box office: US$1,394,221

Shodo Girls: Watashitachi no Koshien (Japanese: 書道ガールズ!! わたしたちの甲子園) is a 2010 Japanese film. This film is based on the story behind the Shodō Performance Kōshien, a performance calligraphy competition in Ehime Prefecture, Japan. Directed by Ryuichi Inomata, this film stars actress Riko Narumi as the head of the school's calligraphy club. Set in Shikokuchuo, a town famous for its calligraphy paper, Shodo Girls tells the story of three high school girls who revived the depression-battered town by organizing a performance calligraphy competition.

Shodo Girls was featured at the 2010 Cannes market, an event that runs concurrently with the Cannes Film Festival. It was subsequently released in Japan on 15 May 2010. In total, Shodo Girls grossed a total of US$1,394,221 in Japan and Taiwan.

== Plot ==
Shikokuchūō is a town that specializes in making calligraphy paper. However, the town had been devastated by the Japanese Recession, and many shops in the town's shopping arcade were forced to close. Over at Tsumishima High School's calligraphy club, a membership crisis ensues after many of its members left the club in quick succession. Satoko refuses to be worried, and continues to focus on her work for the upcoming national calligraphy competition.

One day, a new relief teacher, Ikezawa, is assigned to the calligraphy club as its adviser. After Satoko and Kana mistake him as a thief, they throw calligraphy ink on him, thus leaving a bad first impression. After hearing that the club only has seven members left, Ikezawa puts up a performance calligraphy show to attract new members. This enraged Satoko, who strongly believes in the traditional method of calligraphy. However, another member, Kiyomi was deeply impressed by the performance and started practicing it, putting her at odds with Satoko, who later chases her away from the club.

Satoko later has a change of heart when she realizes how much calligraphy meant to Kiyomi. She also agreed to put up a performance to commemorate the closure of the shop that Kiyomi's father runs. Ultimately, the performance was a failure, but the club members were surprised at the number of people who came to watch their performance. Just before Kiyomi moved to Hiroshima, she requested Satoko to continue practicing performance calligraphy. At around the same time, Tomoya's grandfather's paper-making workshop burnt down after Tomoya's grandfather started burning the high-quality calligraphy paper he made that no shop wanted to purchase.

Satoko gets a revelation that all is not lost after she finds an unburnt calligraphy paper amidst all the rubble. The calligraphy club then got to work convincing the town's residents to support their idea of starting a performance calligraphy competition and to drum up publicity for the event. The members wanted the competition to revive their dying town. They started practicing very hard, but were frustrated due to the lack of progress. Initially reluctant, Ikezawa finally stepped in to coach them after much persuasion.

Even after practicing for a long time, Ikezawa thinks that their work is still missing something. To overcome this problem, the club members decide to persuade Mio, a former talented club member, back into the club. They eventually succeed and their work gets a big boost. Meanwhile, many schools from around the region have volunteered to participate in the competition. Even the national media have reported about the upcoming competition. To make the competition more meaningful, the members decide only to use the town's famed calligraphy paper, even though those they had were too fragile. Upon seeing their determination, Satoko's father, who was initially opposed to the competition, commissioned Tomoya's grandfather to make a suitably strong calligraphy paper as a sign of his support.

On the day of the competition, the team faces strong teams from other high schools. During their performance, they are off to a good start. However, several mishaps occur and their work is ruined. Despite this setback, the team did not give up and completed their work. After the performance, Ikezawa left the town. In the background, a poster was advertising the next edition of the competition. Ikezawa later opened a letter containing a group photograph of the team and the words "Thank you" written behind. Meanwhile, the members of the calligraphy club vowed not to lose again at the next edition of the competition after receiving a challenge letter from another school.

== Cast ==
- Riko Narumi as Satoko Hayakawa (早川 里子), a third-year student and the president of Tsumishima High School's calligraphy club. Although she is the daughter of a calligraphy teacher and is good at it, she has no interest in calligraphy until she discovers performance calligraphy.
- Rio Yamashita as Mio Okazaki (岡崎 美央), Satoko's main calligraphy rival. She quit the calligraphy club because she needed to work part-time to support her sick mother. Her dream is to become a calligraphy master.
- Nanami Sakuraba as Kana Shinomori (篠森 香奈), a third-year student and the vice-president of the calligraphy club. She is an enthusiastic person, and is also a good friend of Satoko.
- Mitsuki Takahata as Kiyomi Yoshinaga (好永 清美), a member of the calligraphy club. She is unable to read people's feelings, and is not good at studies. Her father runs a shop selling calligraphy supplies, though the shop eventually closed down. She later moved to Hiroshima Prefecture.
- Fujiko Kojima as Koharu Yamamoto (山本 小春), a member of the calligraphy club. She was bullied in junior high school, resulting in her fear of going to school. Even in high school, she is a person who rarely says anything. She uses calligraphy as a means to express herself.
- Nobuaki Kaneko as Hiroto Ikezawa (池澤 宏人), a temporary teacher and the adviser to the calligraphy club. An accomplished calligraphy master, he lost his passion in calligraphy after participating in numerous competitions. Thanks to the students, he later found his passion again.
- Tomohiro Ichikawa as Tomoya Takada (高田 智也), Satoko's childhood friend.
- Win Morisaki as Makoto Ichinose (市ノ瀬 誠), a member of the calligraphy club.
- Ryu Morioka as Takuya Nakano (中野 卓也), a member of the calligraphy club.
- Ryotaro Sakaguchi as Satoru Murakami (村上 悟), a member of the calligraphy club.
- Junkichi Orimoto as Tomoya's grandfather.
- Meikyo Yamada as Satoko's father, a calligraphy teacher.
- Mayumi Asaka as Satoko's mother.
- Yoshiko Miyazaki as Mio's mother. She is a single parent and is hospitalized due to a major illness.
- Hajime Okayama as Kiyomi's father. He runs a calligraphy supply shop in the town's shopping arcade that later closed down due to poor business.

== Production ==
=== Development ===
On 27 August 2009, Nippon Television's "Zoom-in!!Super" program featured a segment regarding Shikokuchuo High School's Shodo Performance Koshien competition. The performance calligraphy competition consists of six-people groups who draw calligraphy while dancing to the background music. This segment received a respectable viewership rating of 10%, despite the segment being only 9 minutes long. In an announcement made on 24 December 2009, it was revealed that a film will be produced based on the story of this competition.

It was revealed that the director Ryuichi Inomata will be in charge of the film. He previously directed the 2007 film A Tale of Mari and Three Puppies. Riko Narumi, who also starred in the 2010 film Bushido Sixteen, was also revealed as the main cast member of the yet-unnamed film. The film is fully supported by Shikokuchuo city. The film title, Shodo Girls, was later announced in the New Year's Day 2010 "Zoom-in" special program.

Supporting cast members were subsequently announced on 23 January 2010. Nanami Sakuraba, who voiced the female lead of the film Summer Wars, stars as the vice-president of the calligraphy club. Actress Rio Yamashita, the lead actress of the film Mahōtsukai ni Taisetsu na Koto, plays the role of the main character's rival whose mother had been hospitalized. Mitsuki Takahata and Fujiko Kojima, who starred in the stage play Kiseki no Hito and the television series Shōkōjo Seira respectively, star as members of the calligraphy club.

=== Filming ===
The filming for Shodo Girls began on 18 January 2010 in Shikokuchuo, the town that this film is set in.

Filming was then moved to an indoor stadium located in Menumaundo Park in Kumagaya, Saitama on 26 March 2010. Riko Narumi had trouble with the large calligraphy brush, which weighs 20 kg. She revealed that she had been practicing performance calligraphy for over the past year, and she added that she was "impressed" when she saw a recording of an actual calligraphy performance. Another challenge the cast faced was the chilly weather during the filming. Nanami Sakuraba said that the cast members simply had to "overcome the cold [weather]". Overall, Riko described the filming as a "success", despite the cast's "lack of practice for this particular scene".

== Release ==
Shodo Girls was released in the Japanese box office on 15 May 2010. On its debut weekend, Shodo Girls grossed US$332,788, making it the 10th highest-grossing film in the Japanese box office that weekend. Overall, the film grossed a total of US$1,394,221 over three weeks in the Japanese box office.

== Reception ==
=== Critical reception ===
The Japan Times reviewer Mark Schilling gave the film a review of 1.5 out of 5. In a critical review, he describes the film as "a TV special done formulaically large, with no spark of originality or wit". He said that the joke of having ink splashed across people's faces were "of all and sundry, again and again, ad infinitum." He concluded the review by saying that the film and jokes were an "embarrassment". However, he did have high praise for actress Riko Narumi, saying that she is "Japan's own underage answer to Meryl Streep". He said that she had acted "with discipline and precision, while never descending to the usual teen- idol mugging."
