= Mount Ishizuchi =

Highest mountain in Shikoku

- 石鎚山
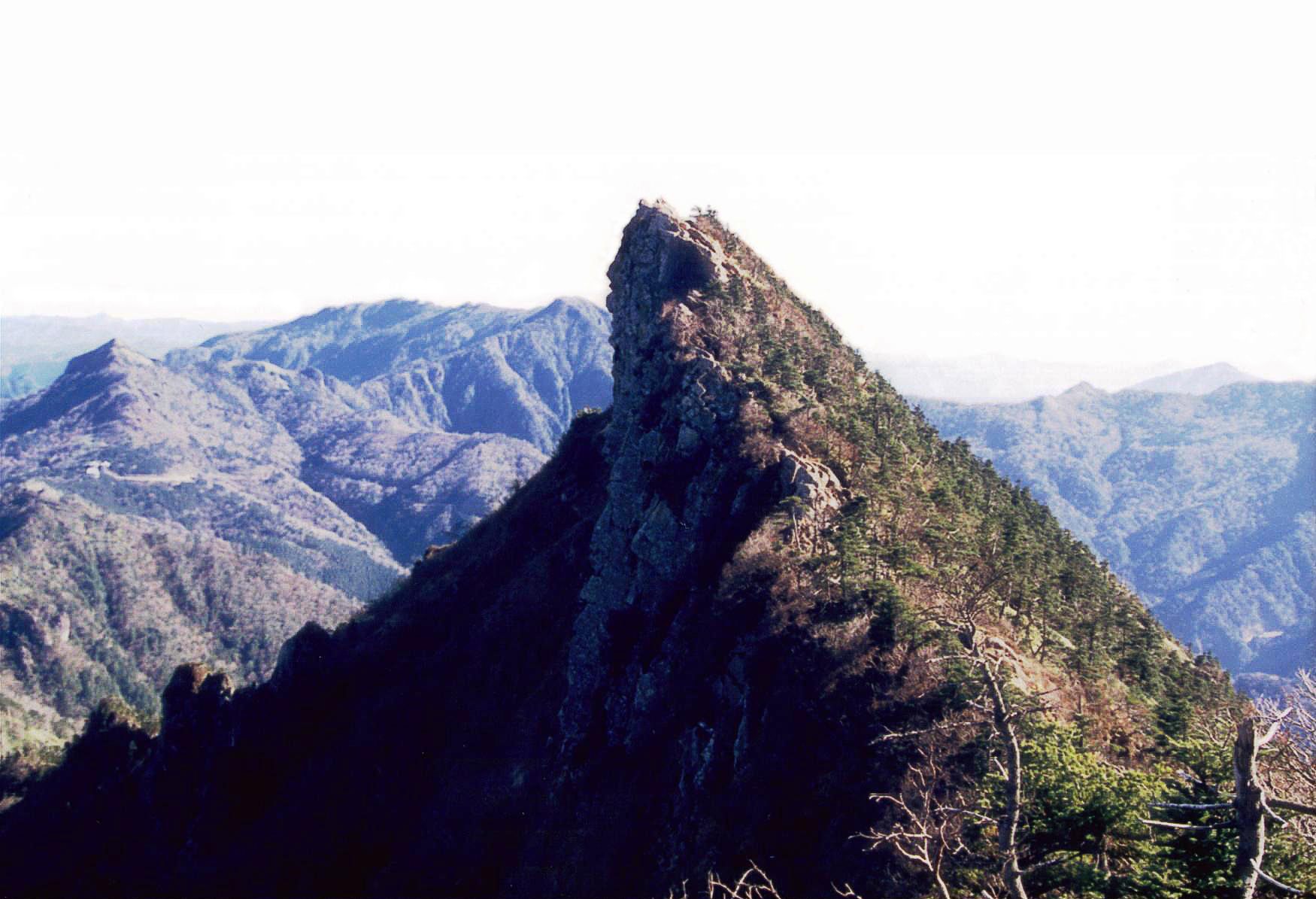
- The highest peak of Mt. Ishizuchi

Highest point
- Elevation: 1,982 m (6,503 ft)
- Prominence: 1,982 m (6,503 ft)
- Listing: Ultra, Ribu
- Coordinates: 33°46′03″N 133°06′54″E

Geography
- Location within Japan
- Location: On the border of Saijō and Kumakōgen, Ehime, Japan
- Parent range: Shikoku Mountains

Geology
- Mountain type: Ruins of old volcano(extinct)
- Last eruption: 15,000,000 years ago

Mount Ishizuchi (石鎚山, Ishizuchi-san) is a 1,982-metre-high (6,503 ft) mountain on the border of Saijō and Kumakōgen, in Ehime, Japan. This mountain is one of the 100 famous mountains in Japan. It is the highest mountain in Western Japan and the island of Shikoku. It is regarded as a sacred mountain.

Once upon a time it was a stratovolcano with large scale magma activity. Over time the magma activity ceased and it became extinct with no eruption activities in the past 10,000 years or recent signs of eruption.

== Outline ==
Mount Ishizuchi is the highest mountain on the island of Shikoku and also the highest mountain west of Mount Haku. It is known as 'the roof of Shikoku' and the sharp, rocky summit resembles a huge stone hammer (石鎚, ishizuchi).

Mount Ishizuchi is an important object of worship in this region and one of the major centers of Shugendō, a sect of mixture of Shinto and Buddhism. At the top of the mountain there is a small shrine called the Ishizuchi Shrine. This mountain is also known as one of Seven Holy Mountains (七霊山, nana reizan). There are several sets of heavy iron chains (鎖, kusari), the longest set being 68 metres (223 ft), leading up to the summit and this is the route many pilgrims opt to take. However, it is possible to hike all the way to the peak along a trail which includes stairs and ramps with handrails.

The climbing season opens every year on July 1, and women are forbidden from climbing the mountain on this day. Between mid-October and mid-November, people come from far and wide to view the autumn colours.

The area around Mount Ishizuchi is a major part of the eponymous Ishizuchi Quasi-National Park.

== Access ==
- Sanchōjōju Station of Ishizuchi Ropeway
- Ishizuchi Tsuchigoya Bus Stop of Iyotetsu Bus
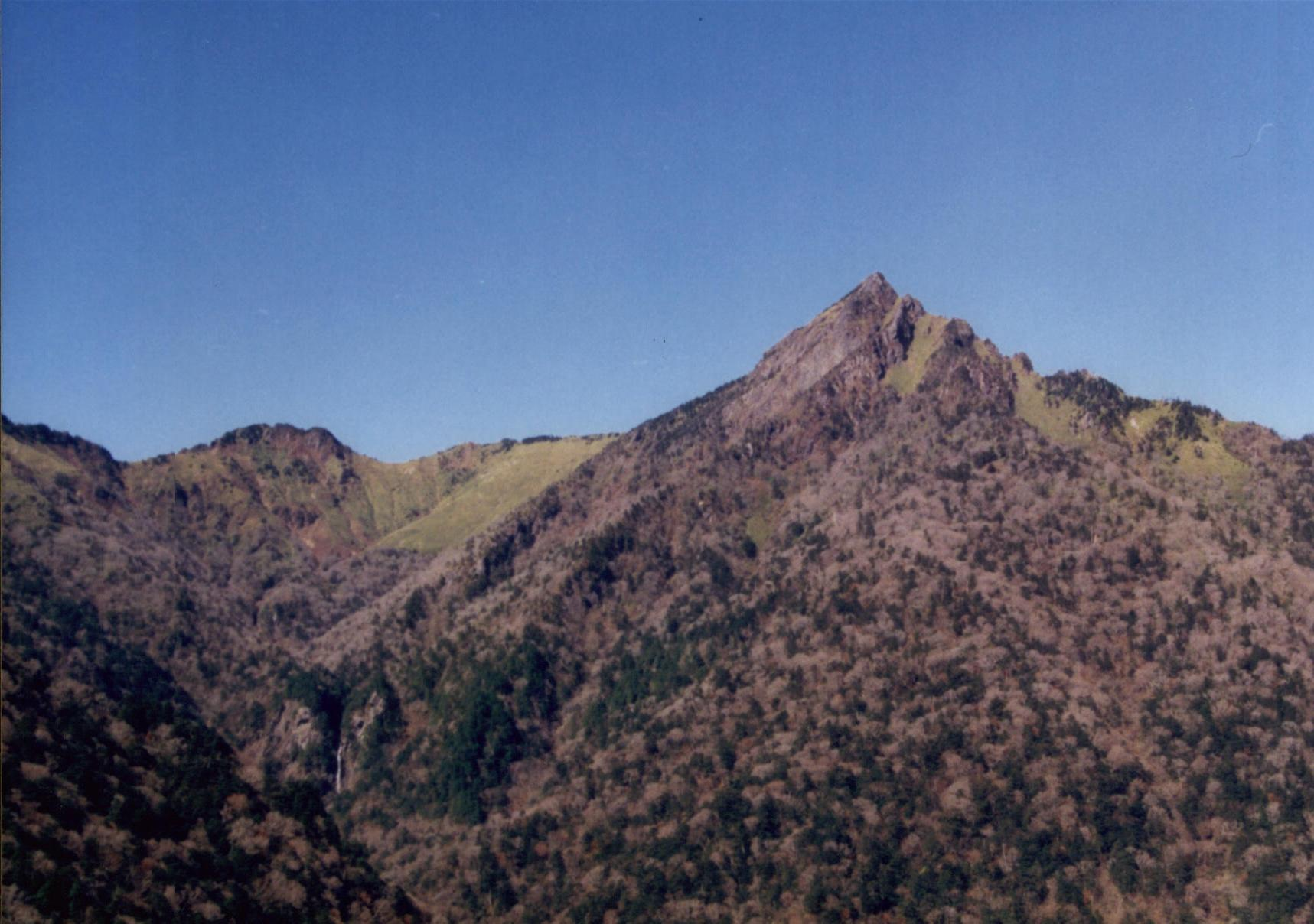
Mount Ishizuchi from South

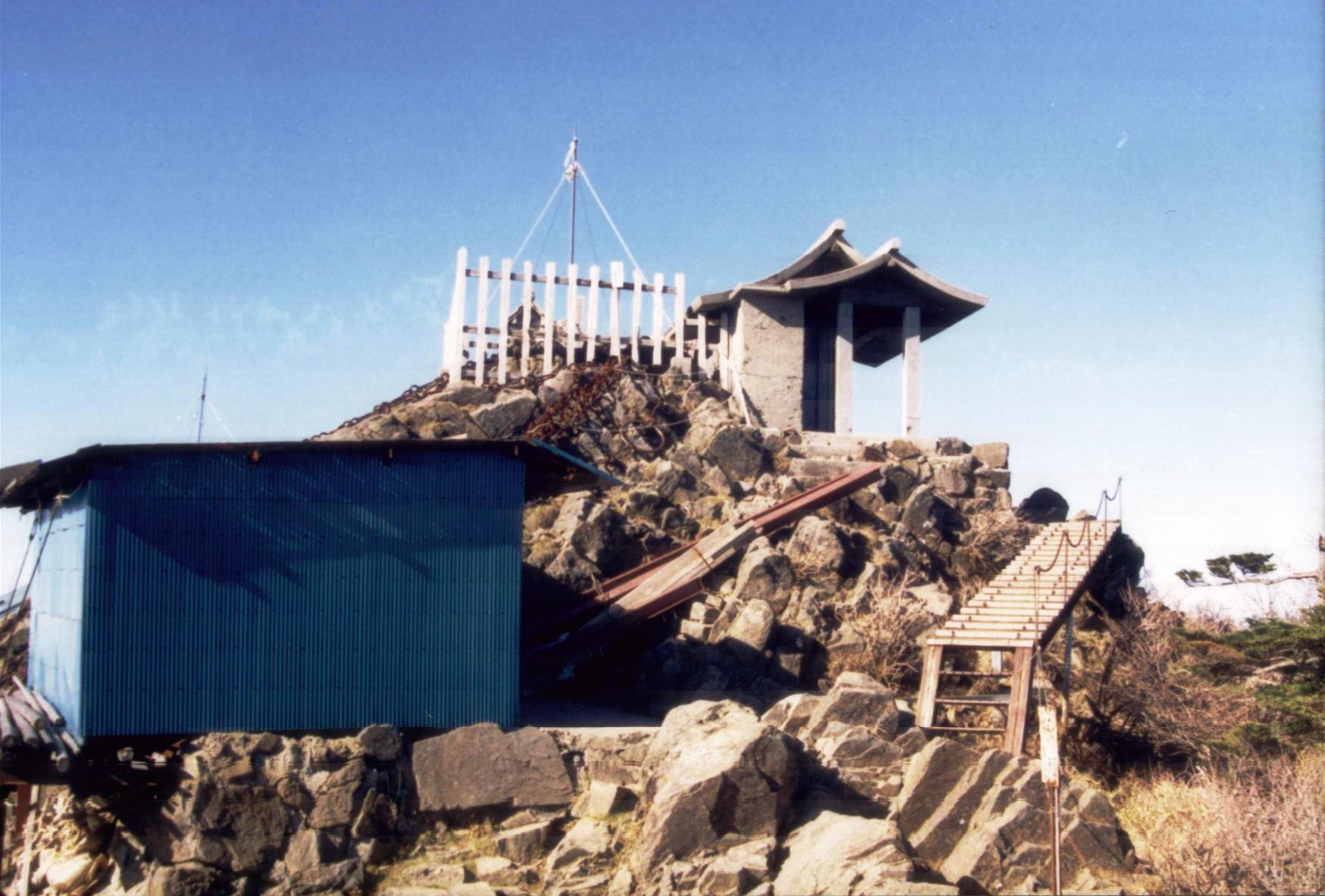
Top of Mount Ishizuchi

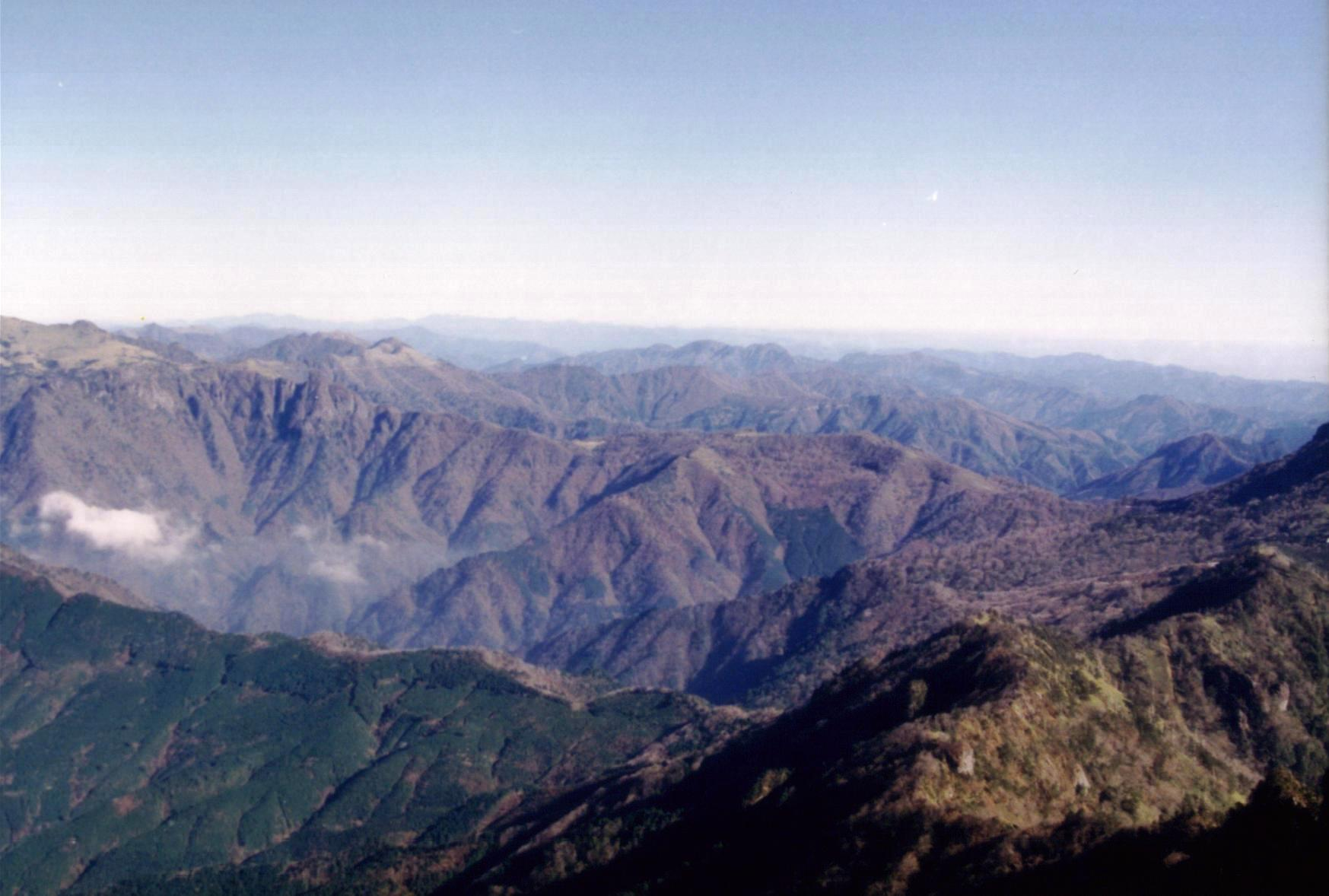
A view of the middle of the mountain

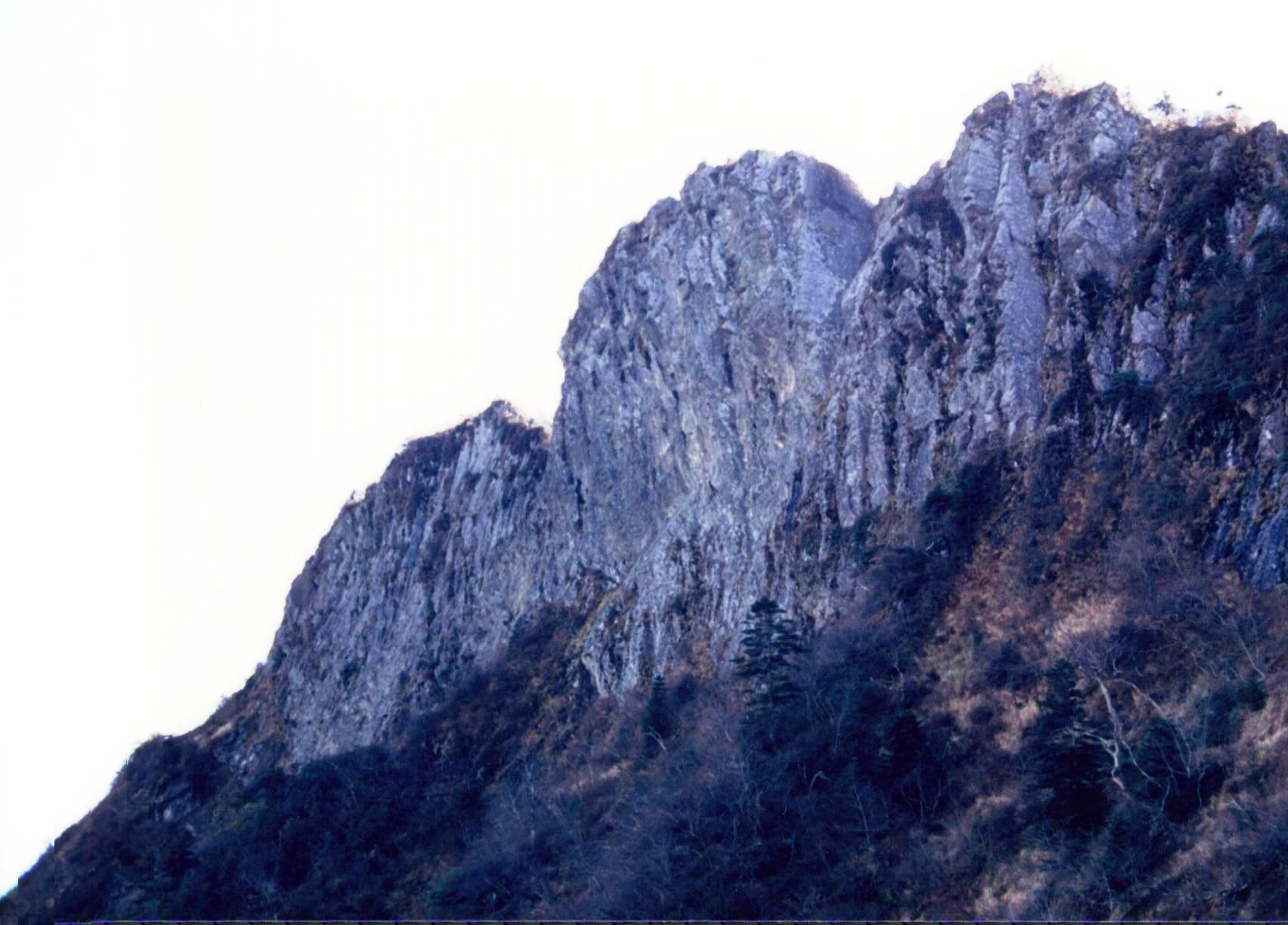
A stone wall of the mountain

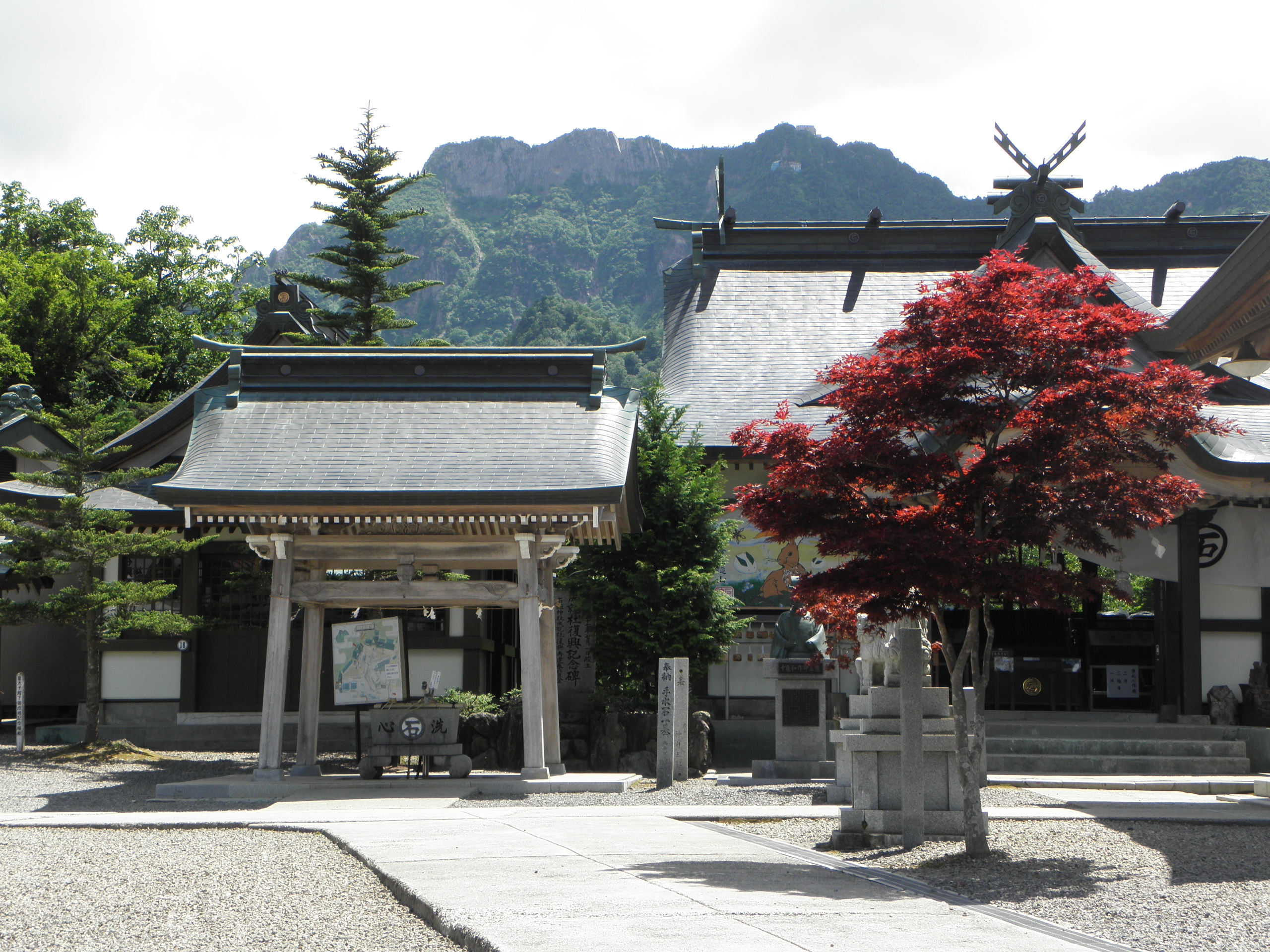
Mt. Ishizuchi from Joju

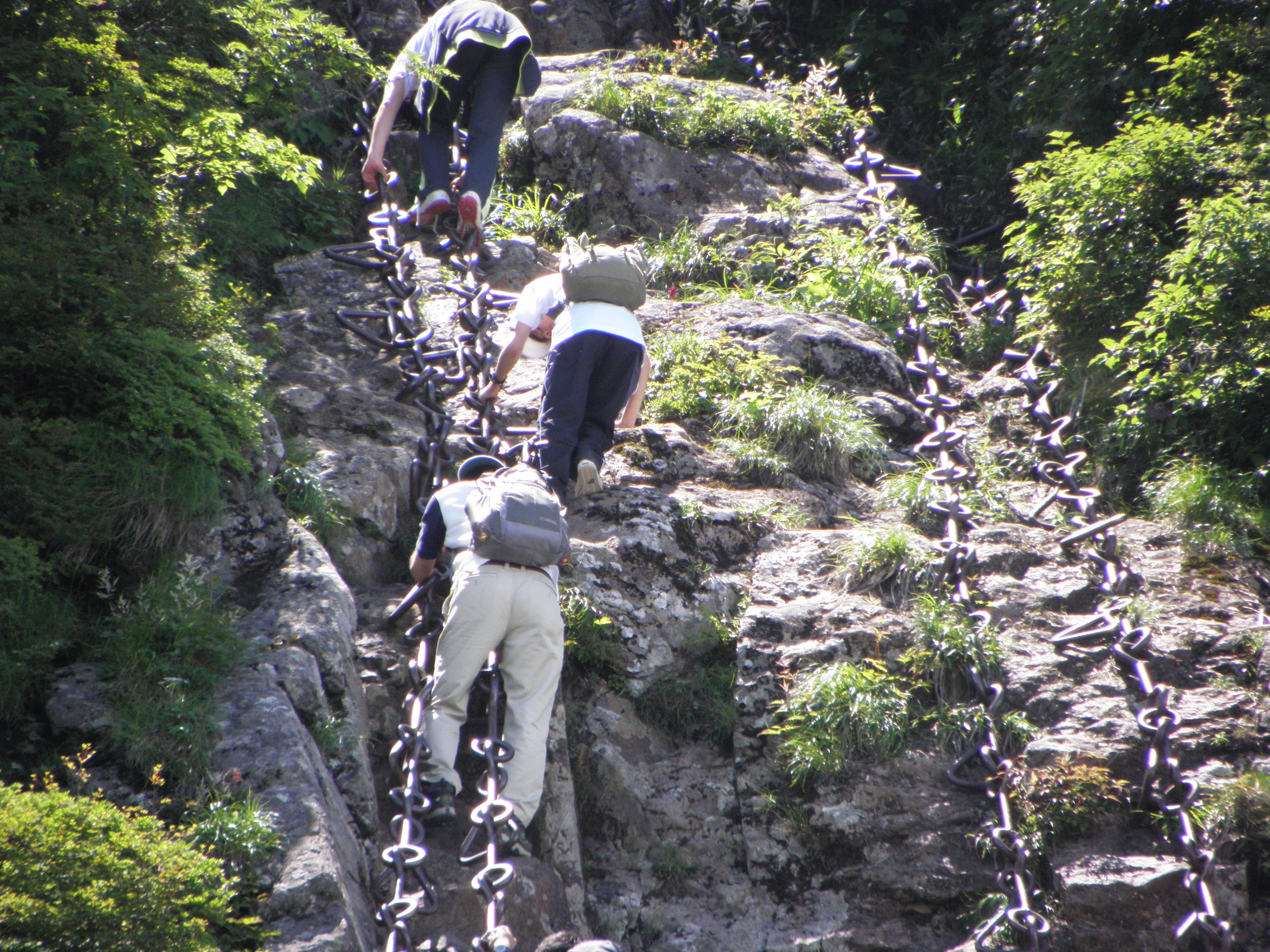
People ascending via the iron chains
