= Naoki Kuwata =

Japanese actor and model (born 1977)

- Born: March 13, 1977 (age 48); Ehime, Japan
- Occupation(s): Actor, Model
- Website: DOMO model, actor and creator agency

Naoki Kuwata (桑田 尚樹, Kuwata Naoki) (born 13 March 1977) is a Japanese actor and model born in Ehime, Japan. He started his modelling career in Japan, but has expanded his range to China and South Korea.

== Career ==
=== Stage ===
- Anti Real

=== Film ===
- Shiawase nara Te wo tatakou(2005)
- Akihabara@Deep(2006)
- Waruboro(2007)
- Kannou-Shousetu(2007)
- The Magic Hour (2008)

=== Television dramas ===
- Kamen Rider W
- MTV SHIBUHARA GIRLS2
- NHK BS premium Cambrian Wars
- BeeTV Mitsu-Fechi

=== Music Videos ===
- Mariah Carey [Boy (I Need You)]
- Yuki [Humming Bird]
- Hideaki Tokunaga [Anatashika Mienakatta]

=== Online Game ===
- REQUIEM
