= Fujiko Kojima =

Japanese actress, fashion model, and television personality

- 小島 藤子
- Born: 16 December 1993 (age 32); Tokyo, Japan
- Occupation: Actress
- Years active: 2007–Present
- Agent: Asia Business Partners
- Style: Film; Television drama; Stage
- Website: Official website

Fujiko Kojima (小島 藤子, Kojima Fujiko; Born on 16 December 1993) is a Japanese actress, fashion model, and tarento represented by Asia Business Partners.

== Biography ==
Kojima's agency scouted her when she was a sixth-grader in elementary school, while she and her father were selecting an animated video in a rental video store. In September 2006, she became the exclusive model for the first issue of the magazine Nico Puchi. But Kojima later moved to Love Berry.

In April 2007, she made regular appearances as an Oha Girl in Oha Suta along with Nozomi Maeda and Serina Nagano. In April 2008, Kojima made her acting debut in the TV drama Kimi Hannin janai yo ne? as the sister of Shihori Kanjiya's character.

In 2009, her first leading role in a film was Oppai Volleyball and Kojima later played the sub-protagonist Maria in the television drama Shōkōjo Seira. In 2010, she obtained leading roles in the films Tomehane! Suzuri Kōkō Shodōbu and Shodo Girls that revolve around calligraphy skills. In 2011, Kojima's first leading role in a television drama was Asu no Hikari o Tsukame 2.

== Filmography ==
=== TV drama ===
Year	Title	Role	Notes	Ref.
2009	Shōkōjo Seira	Maria Takeda		
2010	Tomehane! Suzuri Kōkō Shodōbu	Club Member		
2011	Asu no Hikari o Tsukame 2	Kibo Isoyama	Lead role	
2012	Carnation	Rika Ohara	Asadora	
2013	No Dropping Out: Back to School at 35	Moe Kokubu		
2013	Yamada-kun and the Seven Witches	Maria Sashima		
2014	Shuryō Sekki	Yuki Nakanishi	Lead role	
2015	Burning Flower	Fusa Yoshida	Taiga drama	
2015	Next World: Towa Shūshoku Shiken			
2015	Eikyū Shusoku Shiken	Aya Maekawa		
2017	Retake!	Noe Kitami	Episode 6	
2017	Hiyokko	Sachiko Akiba	Asadora	
2018	Matsuro	Chie Nagao		
2019	General Clerk Takagazu Mizu Cuts Evil!	Kaoruko Nanjo		
2019	Is It a Lily?	Kairi Ninomiya	Lead role	
2019	Sherlock: Untold Stories	Yuko Hosoya	Episode 4	
2020	Raise de wa Chanto Shimasu	Ako Sakuragi	Episode 2 to Final	
2020	Baby Boyfriends	Sakuraba	Episode 6	
2020	Dear Patient - Kizuna no Karute	Shoko Kasahara	Episode 2	
2020	Something's Wrong with Us	Mayu Sayama	Episode 1	
2020	Kyouen NG	Miwa Kusonoki		
2022	The Aromantics	Chizuru Kadowaki		
2024	Onsha no Midare Tadashimasu!	Satsuki Takahashi		

=== Films ===
Year	Title	Role	Notes	Ref.
2009	Oppai Volleyball	Rie Kasuma		
2010	Shodo Girls	Koharu Yamamoto		
2011	Runway Beat	Keiko Shimizu		
2012	Ramo Trip: Crow Ring King Snake	Kanae Hagimoto		
2012	Lesson of the Evil	Misaki Abe		
2015	Five Star Tourist the Movie: We Bring You to the Ultimate	Chihiro		
2016	Yell for the Blue Sky	Hitomi Kasuga		
2017	Hyouka: Forbidden Secrets	Mayaka Ibara		
2018	Uma no Hone	Yuka Sakurahommachi	Lead role	
2019	This Old Road: Konomichi	Reporter		
2019	Toshimaen: Haunted Park	Anju Kozai		
2020	You're There, There Was Such a Time	Shoko Yamazaki		
2020	We are Oh! & Yeah!!	Saori Koyanagi		
2020	Life Senjou no Bokura: Director's Cut	Honoka Shirahaishi		
2022	Shikkokuten	Fuji		
2024	The Crescent Moon with Cats			

=== Stage ===
Year	Title	Role	Notes	Ref.
2015	Go West	Drew		

=== Music videos ===
Year	Title	Artist	Notes	Ref.
2013	"Primal"	Knock Out Monkey		
2013	"Climber"	Knock Out Monkey		

== Bibliography ==
=== Photo Albums ===
Year	Title	Notes
2009	fuwa fuwa	
2012	aButton Vol.7_Kotoba: Fujiko Kojima	Also on PlayStation 3 and Blu-ray
2012	Fujiko	
2013	Yumeiro Natsuiro	Digital

=== Magazines ===
Title	Notes
Disney Fan	
Nico Puchi	Exclusive Model
Love Berry	Exclusive Model

=== Catalogues ===
Year	Item
2011	Hama Chirimen 2011 Calendar
2012	Ondine "Kimono" Catelogue
