= Okudōgo Tamagawa Prefectural Natural Park =

Natural park of Ehime prefecture, Japan

Coordinates: 33°56′46″N 132°51′00″E

- 奥道後玉川県立自然公園
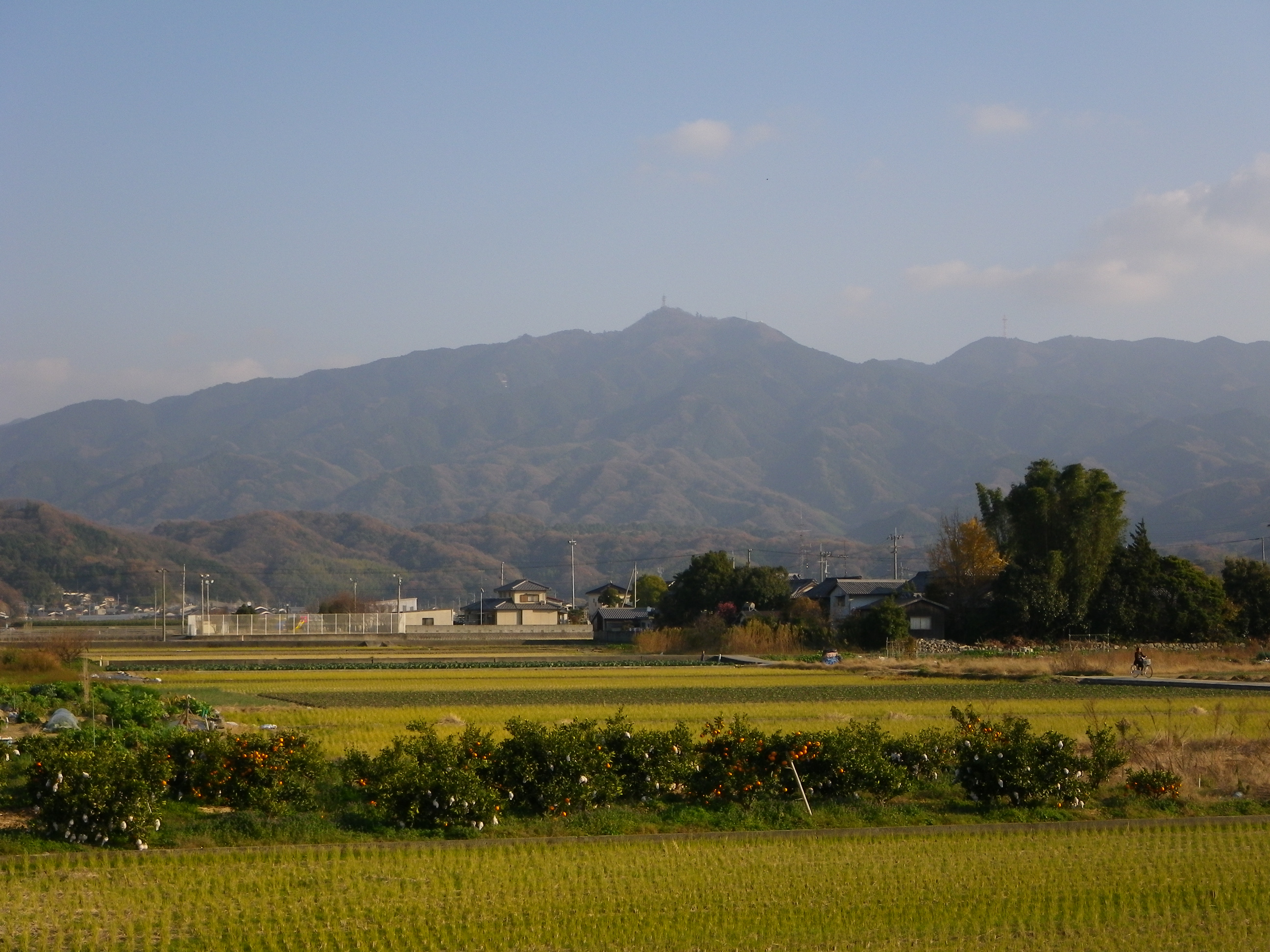
- Mount Takanawa
- Interactive map of Okudōgo Tamagawa Prefectural Natural Park
- Location: Ehime Prefecture, Japan
- Nearest city: Imabari, Matsuyama
- Area: 77.5 square kilometres (29.9 sq mi)
- Established: 9 March 1962

Okudōgo Tamagawa Prefectural Natural Park (奥道後玉川県立自然公園, Okudōgo Tamagawa kenritsu shizen-kōen) is a Prefectural Natural Park in Ehime Prefecture, Japan. Established in 1962, the park spans the borders of the municipalities of Imabari and Matsuyama. The area is centered around the upper reaches of the Ishite River in Matsuyama City.

== See also ==
- National Parks of Japan
- Dōgo Onsen
- Tamagawa, Ehime
