= Sasayama Prefectural Natural Park =

Park in Japan

Coordinates: 33°03′22″N 132°39′32″E

- 篠山県立自然公園
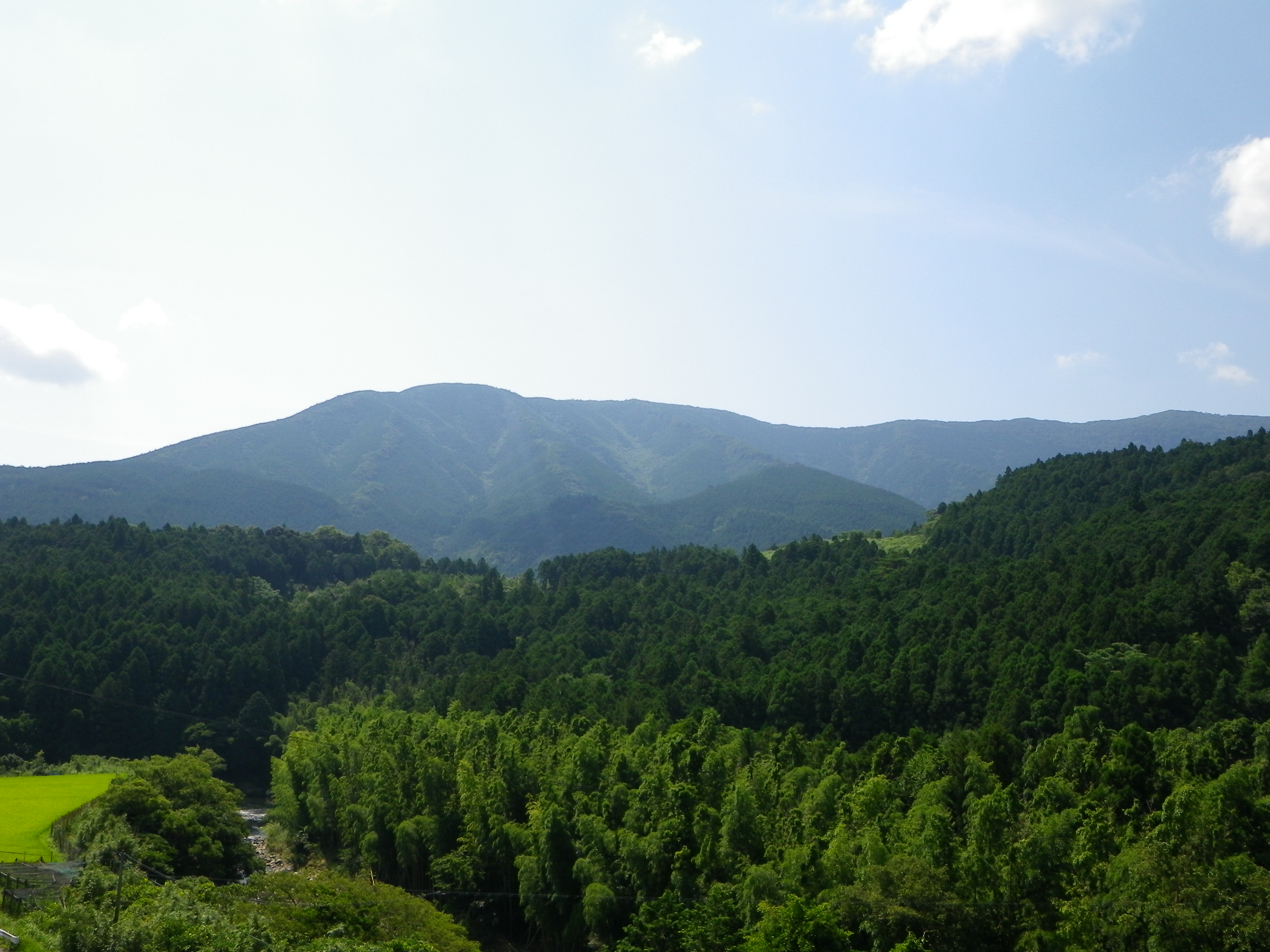
- Mount Sasa
- Interactive map of Sasayama Prefectural Natural Park
- Location: Ehime Prefecture, Japan
- Nearest city: Ainan, Uwajima
- Area: 8.219 square kilometres (3.173 sq mi)
- Established: 21 March 1964

Sasayama Prefectural Natural Park (篠山県立自然公園, Sasayama kenritsu shizen-kōen) is a Prefectural Natural Park in southern Ehime Prefecture, Japan. Established in 1964 and extended in 1972, the park spans the borders of the municipalities of Ainan and Uwajima. The park's central feature, the eponymous Mount Sasa, which rises to a height of 1,064.6 metres (3,493 ft), stands on the border between Ehime and Kochi prefectures.

== See also ==
- National Parks of Japan
