= Hirota (surname) =

Hirota (written: 廣田, 広田, 弘田 or 弘太) is a Japanese surname. Notable people with the surname include:

- Aika Hirota (born 1999), Japanese singer
- Dennis Hirota (born 1946), American Buddhist
- Hajime Hirota (広田 一, born 1968), Japanese politician
- Haruka Hirota (廣田 遥, born 1984), Japanese trampoline gymnast
- Kōki Hirota (廣田 弘毅, 1878–1948), Japanese diplomat and politician
- Kōsei Hirota (廣田 行生, born 1951), Japanese voice actor
- Mieko Hirota (弘田 三枝子, 1947–2020), Japanese singer
- Mizuto Hirota (廣田 瑞人, born 1981), Japanese mixed martial artist
- Reona Hirota (広田 レオナ, born 1963), Japanese actress
- Ryuji Hirota (廣田 隆治, born 1993), Japanese footballer
- Ryūtarō Hirota (弘田 龍太郎, 1892–1952), Japanese composer
- Saeko Hirota, Japanese table tennis player
- Satoru Hirota (広田 悟, born 1973), Japanese golfer
- Sayaka Hirota (廣田 彩花, born 1994), Japanese badminton player
- Tatsu Hirota (広田 多津, 1904–1990), Japanese painter
- Tomokazu Hirota (born 1976), Japanese drifter
- Yoshitaka Hirota (弘田 佳孝, born 1971), Japanese video game composer
