= Ishizuchi Quasi-National Park =

Quasi-national park in Japan

- 石鎚国定公園
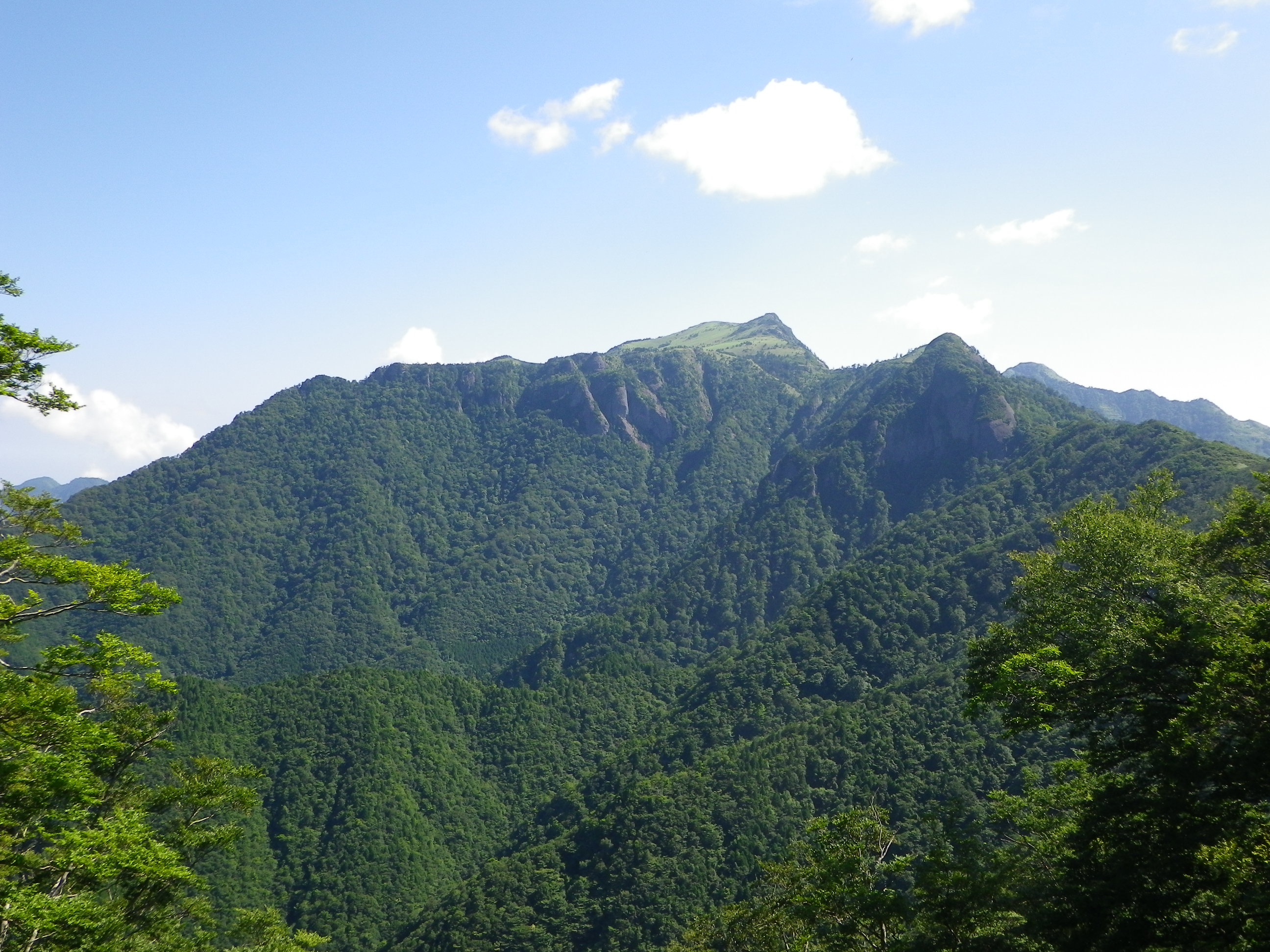
- Mount Kamegamori

- Location within Japan
- Location: Ehime/Kōchi Prefecture, Japan
- Coordinates: 33.733°N 133.125°E
- Area: 106.83 km^{2} (41.25 sq mi)
- Established: 1 November 1955

Ishizuchi Kokutei Kōen (石鎚国定公園) is a Quasi-National Park in Ehime Prefecture and Kōchi Prefecture, Japan. It was founded on 1 November 1955 and has an area of 106.83 km^{2} (41.25 sq mi). The park's central feature is the eponymous Mount Ishizuchi, which at 1,982 metres high (6,503 ft) is the highest mountain in Western Japan and the island of Shikoku.

== Related municipalities ==
- Ehime Prefecture: Kumakōgen, Saijō
- Kōchi Prefecture

== See also ==
- List of national parks of Japan
