= Tobe, Ehime =

Tobe 砥部町
- Town
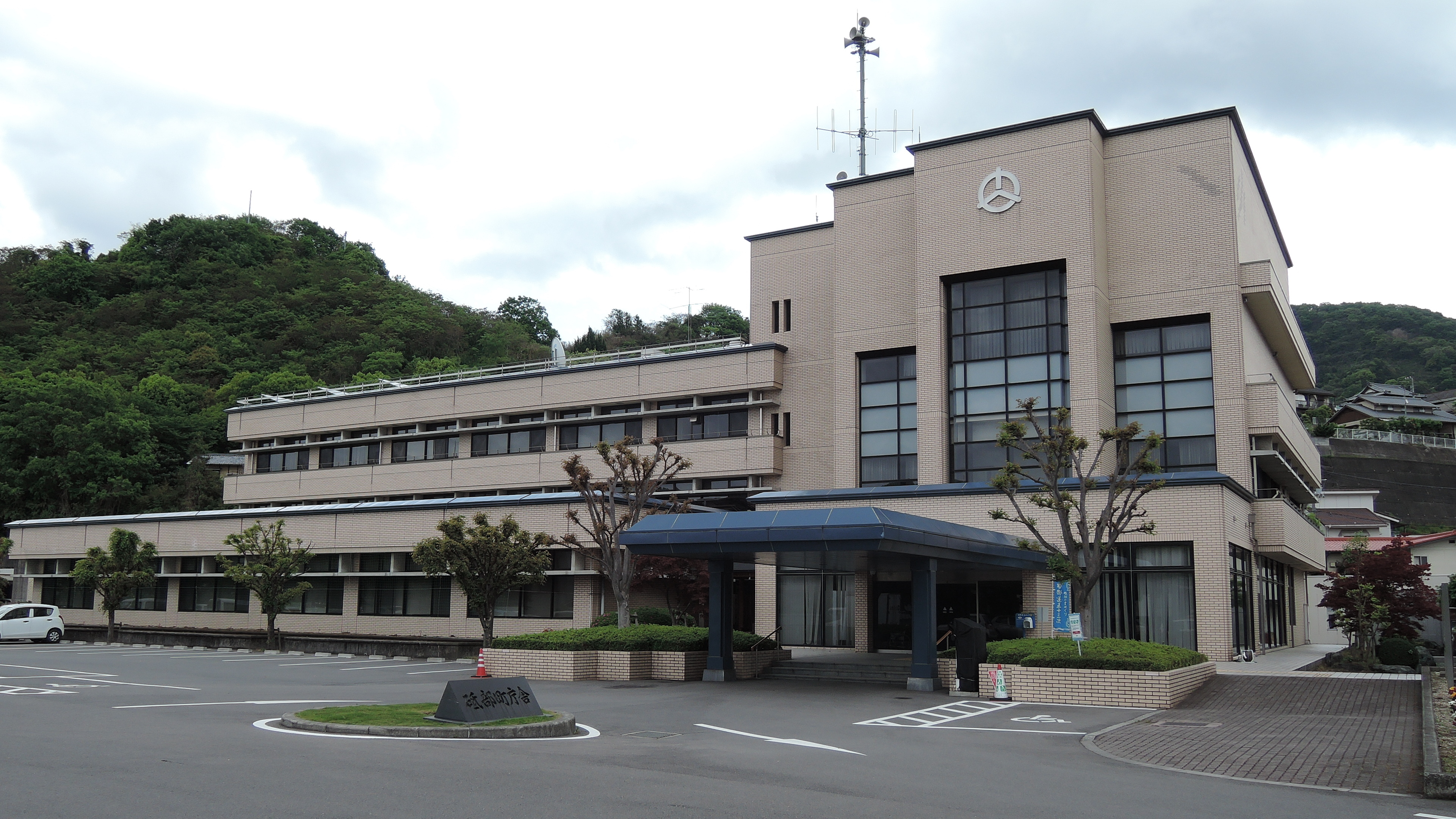
- Tobe Town Hall

- Flag Emblem
- Location of Tobe in Ehime Prefecture

- Location in Japan
- Coordinates: 33°45′N 132°48′E
- Country: Japan
- Region: Shikoku
- Prefecture: Ehime
- District: Iyo

Area
  - Total: 101.59 km^{2} (39.22 sq mi)

Population (February 28, 2022)
  - Total: 20,485
  - Density: 201.64/km^{2} (522.26/sq mi)
- Time zone: UTC+09:00 (JST)
- City hall address: 1392 Miyauchi, Tobe-chō, Iyo-gun, Ehime-ken 791-2195
- Website: Official website
- Symbols
- Flower: Ume (梅)
- Tree: Sawtooth Oak (櫟, Kunugi)

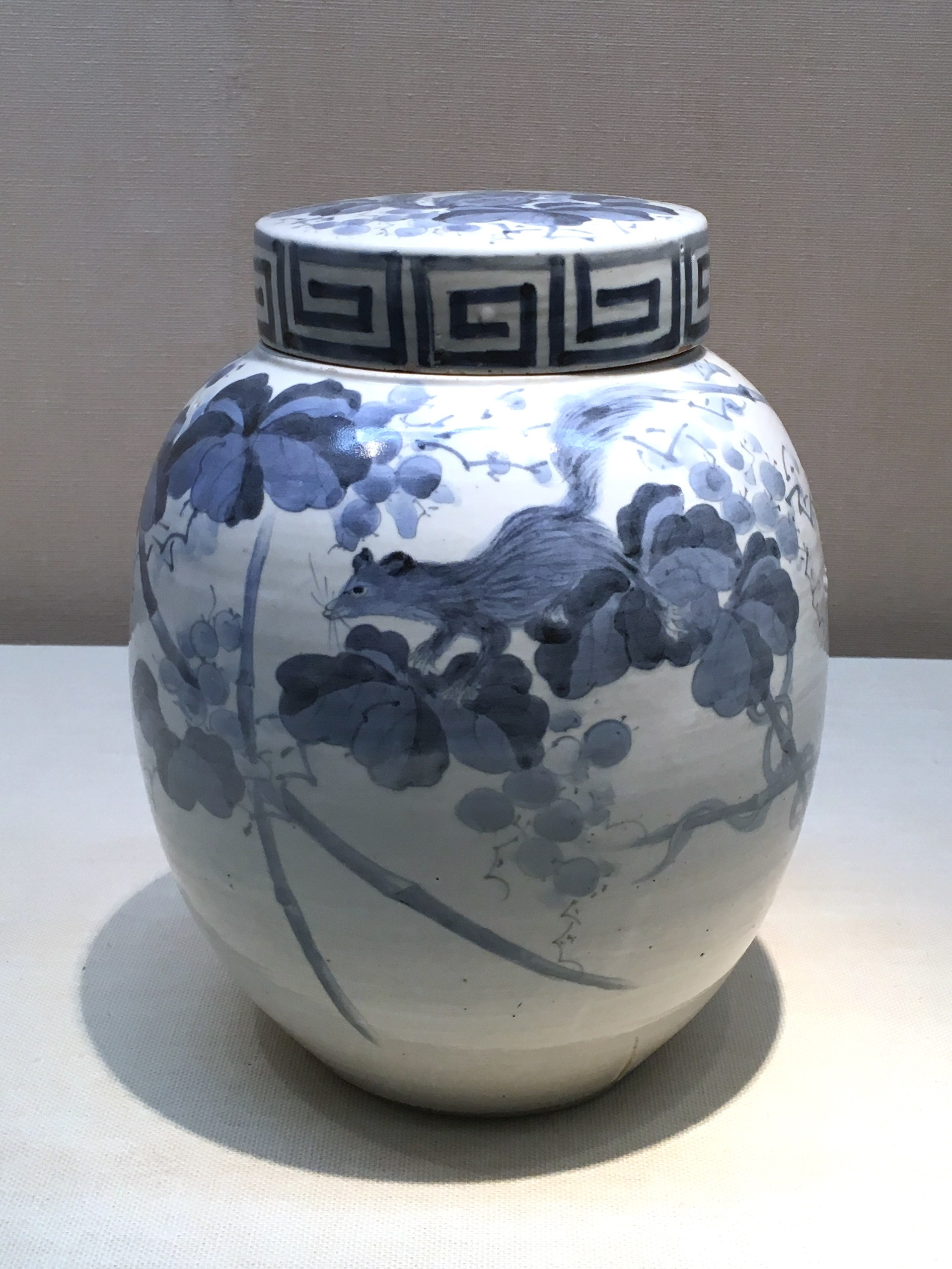
example of Tobe ceramics

Tobe (砥部町, Tobe-chō) is a town located in Iyo District, Ehime Prefecture, Japan. As of 28 February 2022, the town had an estimated population of 20,485 in 9385 households and a population density of 200 persons per km^{2}. The total area of the town is 101.59 square kilometres (39.22 sq mi).

== Geography ==
Tobe is almost in the center of Ehime Prefecture, across the Shigenobu River south of Matsuyama City. There are many mountains in the south, and the northern portion of the town occupies the southern tip of the Matsuyama Plain. The entire Tobe area is located on gentle hills.

=== Surrounding municipalities ===
Ehime Prefecture

- Iyo
- Kumakōgen
- Masaki
- Matsuyama
- Uchiko

=== Climate ===
Tobe has a humid subtropical climate (Köppen Cfa) characterized by warm summers and cool winters with light snowfall. The average annual temperature in Tobe is 14.3 °C. The average annual rainfall is 1777 mm with September as the wettest month. The temperatures are highest on average in January, at around 25.4 °C, and lowest in January, at around 3.2 °C.

== Demographics ==
Per Japanese census data, the population of Tobe peaked around the year 2000 and has declined slightly in the decades since.

Historical population
| Year | Pop. | ±% |
|---|---|---|
| 1920 | 11,810 | — |
| 1930 | 11,891 | +0.7% |
| 1940 | 12,011 | +1.0% |
| 1950 | 15,829 | +31.8% |
| 1960 | 14,603 | −7.7% |
| 1970 | 13,831 | −5.3% |
| 1980 | 17,958 | +29.8% |
| 1990 | 20,802 | +15.8% |
| 2000 | 22,075 | +6.1% |
| 2010 | 21,981 | −0.4% |
| 2020 | 20,480 | −6.8% |

== History ==
The area of Tobe was part of ancient Iyo Province. There are a number of Kofun period burial mounds within the city limits, and the name of Tobe appears in Nara period records as an estate belonging to the temple of Hōryū-ji. The area was famous from the Heian period onwards for its production of whetstones. During the Edo period, the area was part of the holdings of Matsuyama Domain and was later part of Ōzu Domain and its subsidiary Niiya Domain. The village of Tobe was established with the creation of the modern municipalities system in 1889. It was raised to town status in 1928 and annexed the neighboring village of Haramachi in 1955. On January 1, 2005, the village of Hirota, also from Iyo District, was merged into Tobe.

== Government ==
Tobe has a mayor-council form of government with a directly elected mayor and a unicameral town council of 16 members. Tobe, together with the town of Matsumae, contributes two members to the Ehime Prefectural Assembly. In terms of national politics, the town is part of Ehime 2nd district of the lower house of the Diet of Japan.

== Economy ==
Tobe is famous for the production of Tobe ware ceramics, and there are more than 80 kilns in the town. Agriculture, notably citrus cultivation and light manufacturing (food processing and electrical components) are mainstays of the local economy. The town is also increasing a commuter town for neighboring Matsuyama.

== Education ==
Tobe has four public elementary schools and one public middle school operated by the town government, and one public high school operated by the Ehime Prefectural Board of Education. The Ehime Prefectural University of Health Science is located in the town.

== Transportation ==
=== Railway ===
Tobe has no passenger rail service. The nearest stations are Iyotetsu's Matsuyamashi Station or Iyo-Tachibana Station.

=== Highway ===
- Matsuyama Expressway
- National Route 33
- National Route 379

== Local attractions ==
- Ehime Prefectural Sports Compex
- Tobe Zoological Park

== Noted people from Tobe ==
- Masao Inoue, stage actor, director

== Gallery ==
Konpirasan Park

Rishoin Temple

Tobe Thrust Fault
