= Ehime Prefecture =

Prefecture of Japan

Ehime Prefecture 愛媛県
- Prefecture

Japanese transcription(s)
  - Japanese: 愛媛県
  - Rōmaji: Ehime-ken
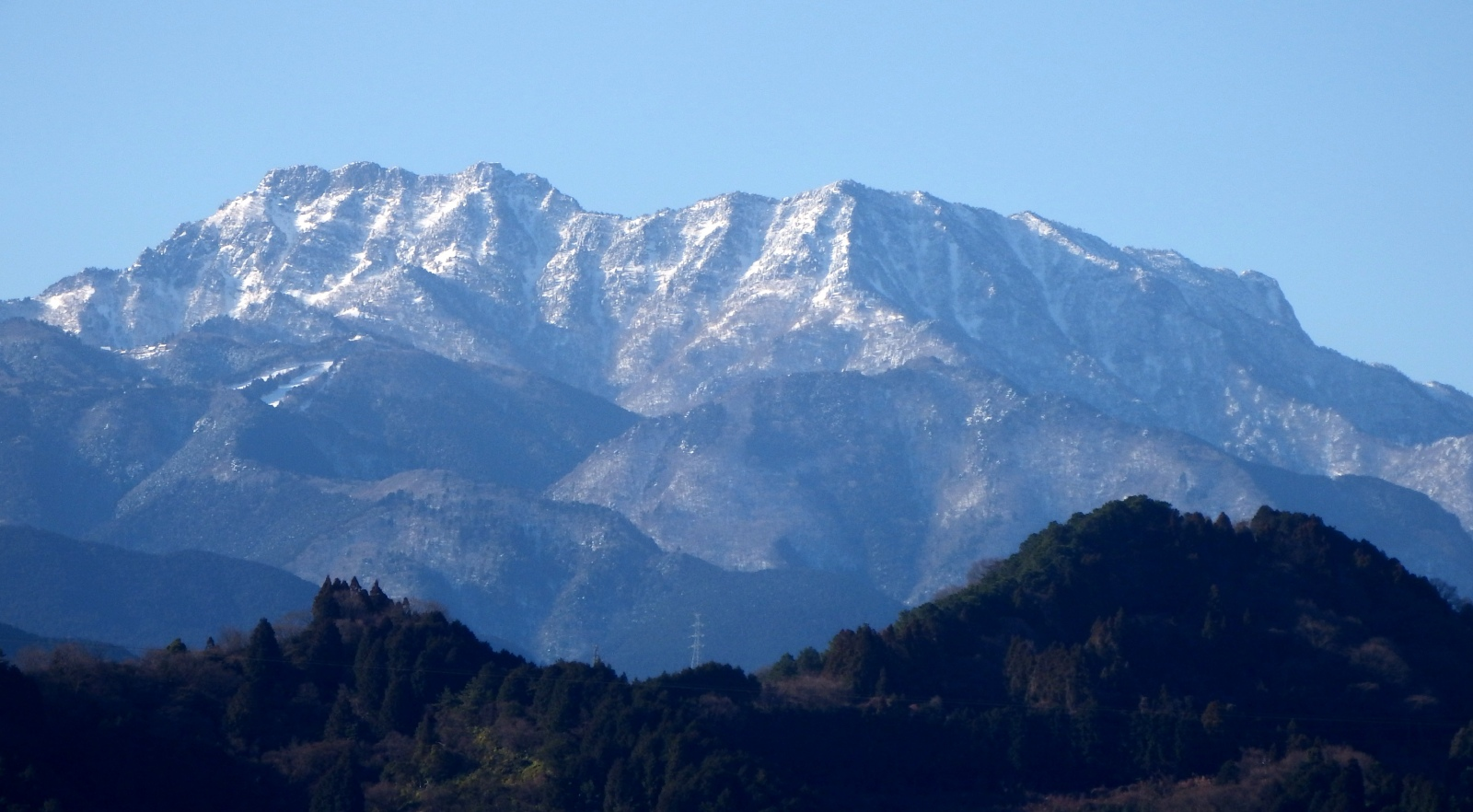
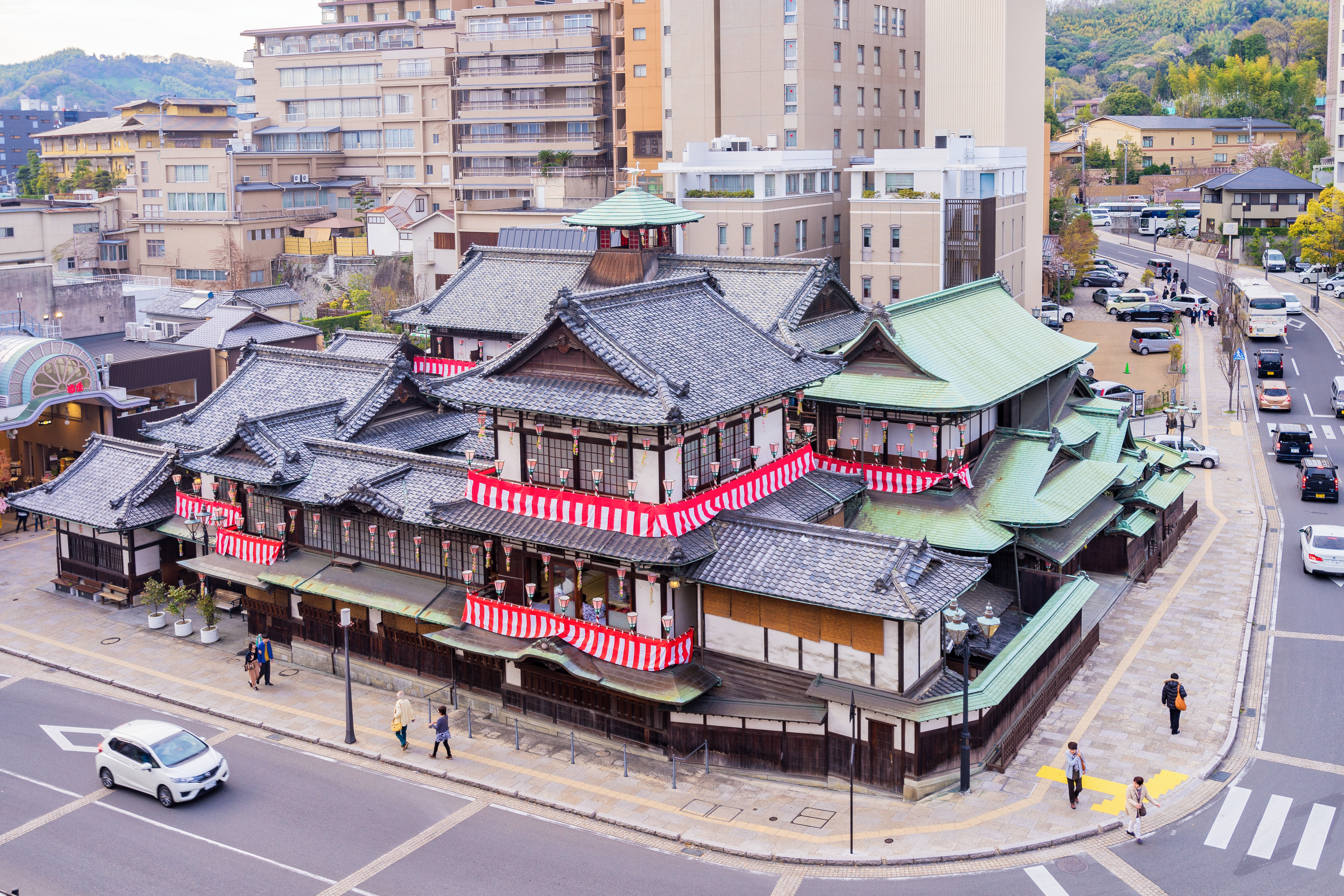
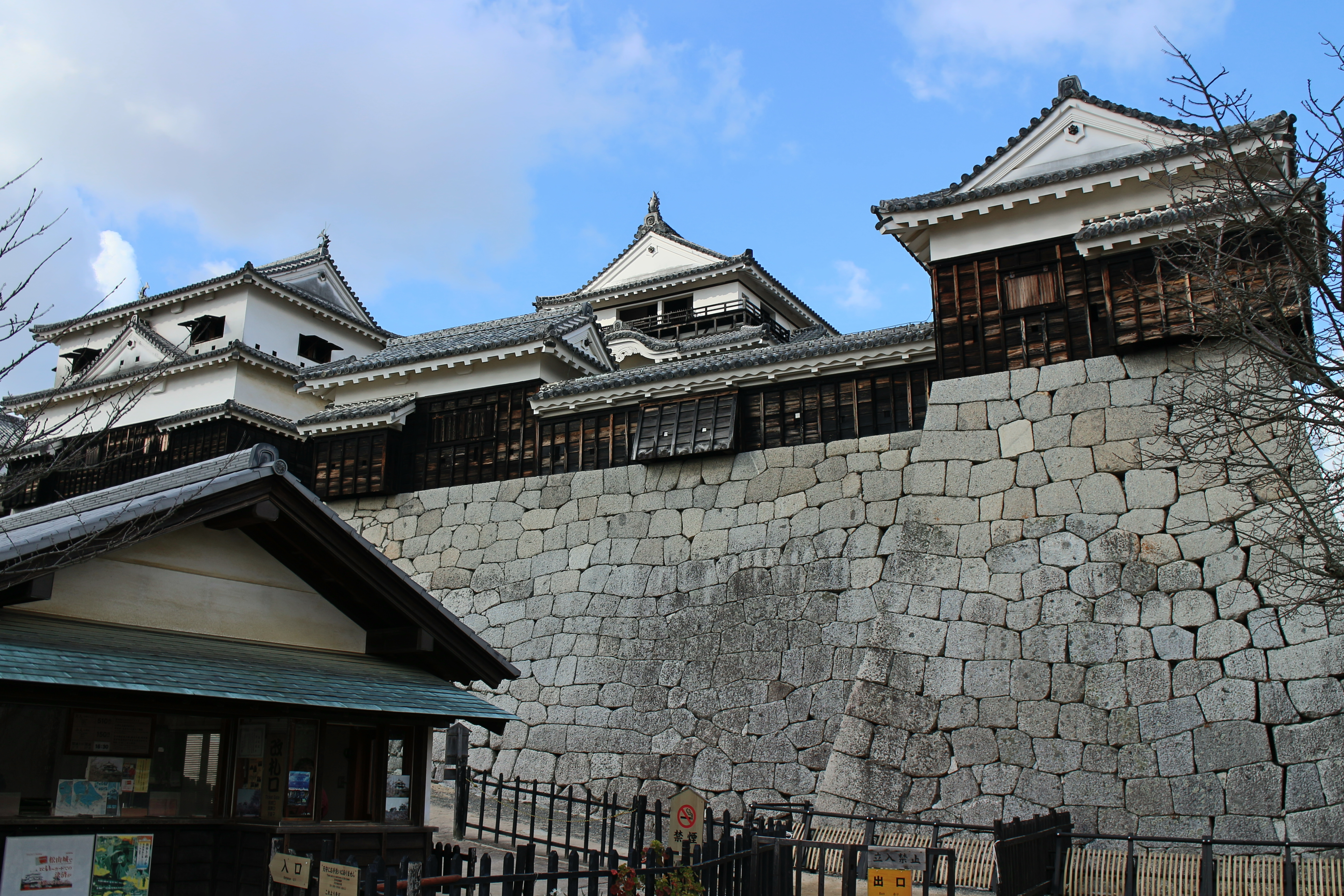
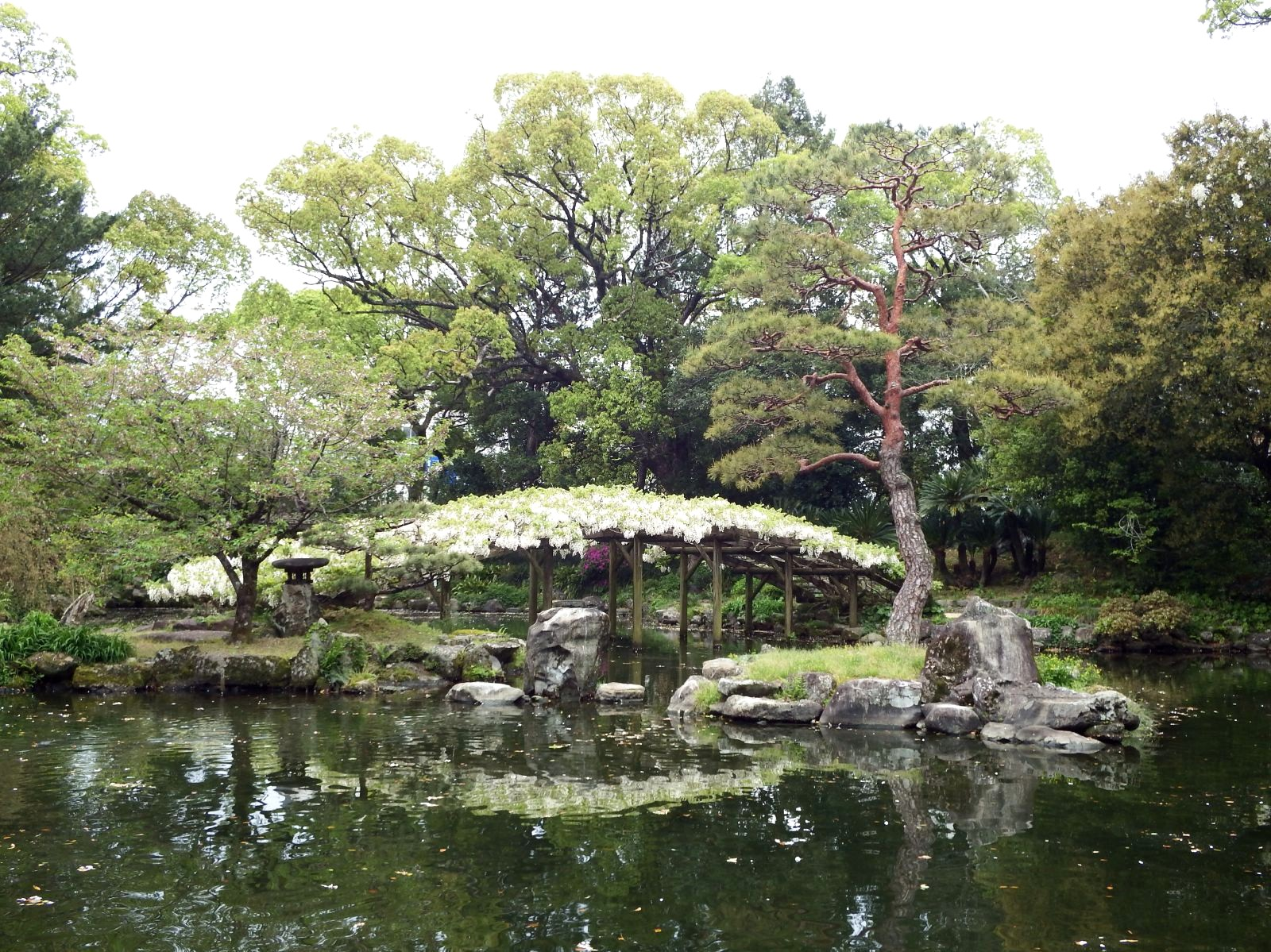
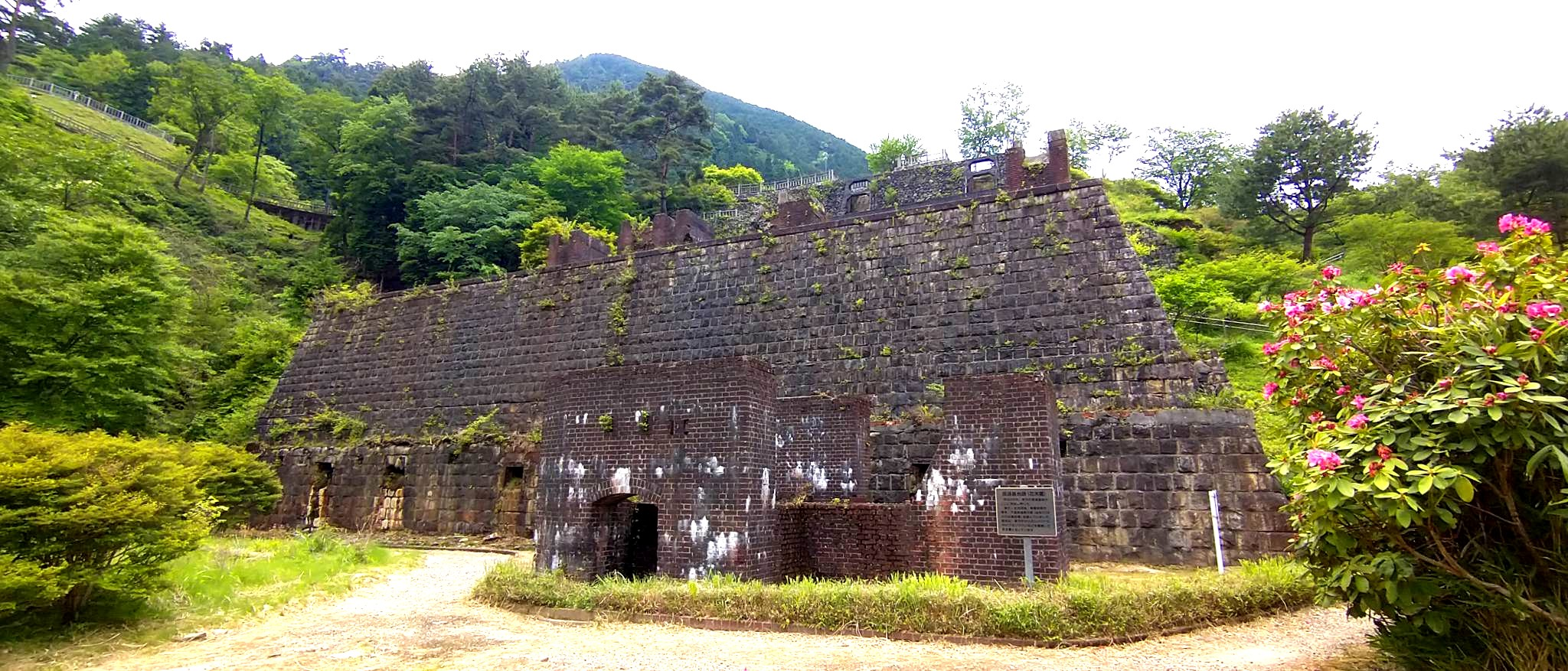
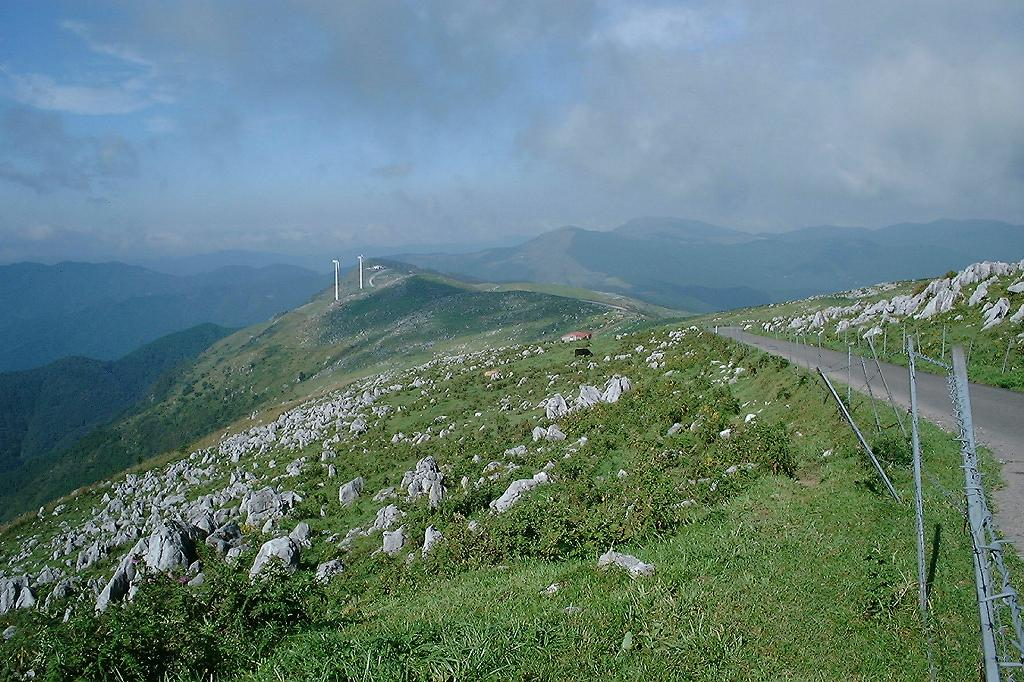
- View of Mount Ishizuchi Dogo Onsen Matsuyama Castle Uwajima Tensya Garden Besshi copper mine heritage site Shikoku Karst (Godan Plateau)

- Flag Emblem
- Anthem: Ehime no uta
- Coordinates: 33°50′N 132°50′E
- Country: Japan
- Region: Shikoku
- Island: Shikoku
- Capital: Matsuyama
- Subdivisions: Districts: 7, Municipalities: 20

Government
  - Governor: Tokihiro Nakamura (since December 2010)

Area
  - Total: 5,676.23 km^{2} (2,191.60 sq mi)
  - Rank: 26th

Population (October 1, 2020)
  - Total: 1,334,841
  - Rank: 28th
  - Density: 235.163/km^{2} (609.070/sq mi)

GDP
  - Total: JP¥5,138 billion US$37.9 billion (2022)
- ISO 3166 code: JP-38
- Website: www.pref.ehime.jp/index-e.html
- Symbols of Japan
- Bird: Japanese robin (Erithacus akahige)
- Fish: Red sea bream (Pagrus major)
- Flower: Satsuma mandarin (Citrus unshiu)
- Mammal: Japanese river otter ("Lutra lutra whiteleyi")
- Tree: Pine (Pinus)

Ehime Prefecture (愛媛県, Ehime-ken; Japanese pronunciation: [é̞.çì.mè̞, è̞.çí.mé̞.kè̞ɴ̀]) is a prefecture of Japan located on the island of Shikoku. Ehime Prefecture has a population of 1,334,841 and a geographic area of 5,676 km^{2} (2,191 sq mi). Ehime Prefecture borders Kagawa Prefecture to the northeast, Tokushima Prefecture to the east, and Kōchi Prefecture to the southeast. Ehime Prefecture also borders Hiroshima Prefecture for 74 metres (243 ft) on Hyōtanjima.

Matsuyama is the capital and largest city of Ehime Prefecture and the largest city on Shikoku, with other major cities including Imabari, Niihama, and Saijō.

Notable past Ehime residents include three Nobel Prize winners: Kenzaburo Oe (1994 Nobel Prize in Literature), Shuji Nakamura (2014 Nobel Prize in Physics), and Syukuro Manabe (2021 Nobel Prize in Physics).

== History ==
Until the Meiji Restoration, Ehime Prefecture was known as Iyo Province. Since before the Heian period, the area was dominated by fishermen and sailors who played an important role in defending Japan against pirates and Mongolian invasions.

After the Battle of Sekigahara, the Tokugawa shōgun gave the area to his allies, including Katō Yoshiaki who built Matsuyama Castle, forming the basis for the modern city of Matsuyama.

The name Ehime comes from the kuniumi part of the Kojiki where Iyo Province is mythologically named Ehime, "lovely princess".

In 2012, a research group from the University of Tokyo and Ehime University said they had discovered rare earth deposits in Matsuyama.

== Geography ==
Located in the northwestern part of Shikoku, Ehime faces the Seto Inland Sea to the north and is bordered by Kagawa and Tokushima in the east and Kōchi in the south.

The prefecture includes both high mountains in the inland region and a long coastline, with many islands in the Seto Inland Sea. The westernmost arm of Ehime, the Sadamisaki Peninsula, is the narrowest peninsula in Japan.

As of 31 March 2020, 7 percent of the total land area of the prefecture was designated as Natural Parks, namely the Ashizuri-Uwakai and Setonaikai National Parks; Ishizuchi Quasi-National Park; and Hijikawa, Kinshako, Okudōgo Tamagawa, Sadamisaki Hantō-Uwakai, Saragamine Renpō, Sasayama, and Shikoku Karst Prefectural Natural Parks.

=== Cities ===
Ehime prefecture population pyramid in 2020

Map of Ehime Prefecture. City Town

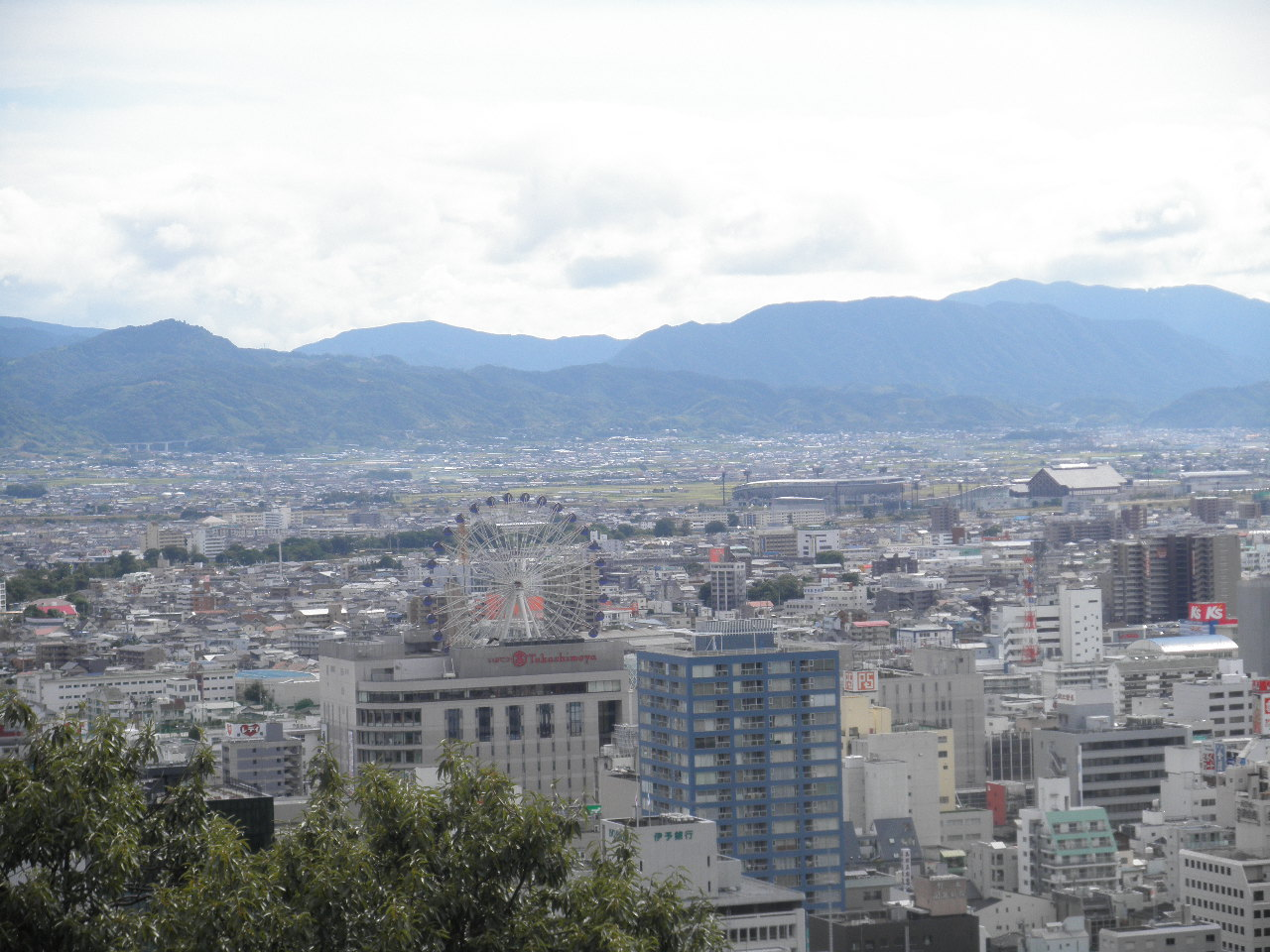
Matsuyama

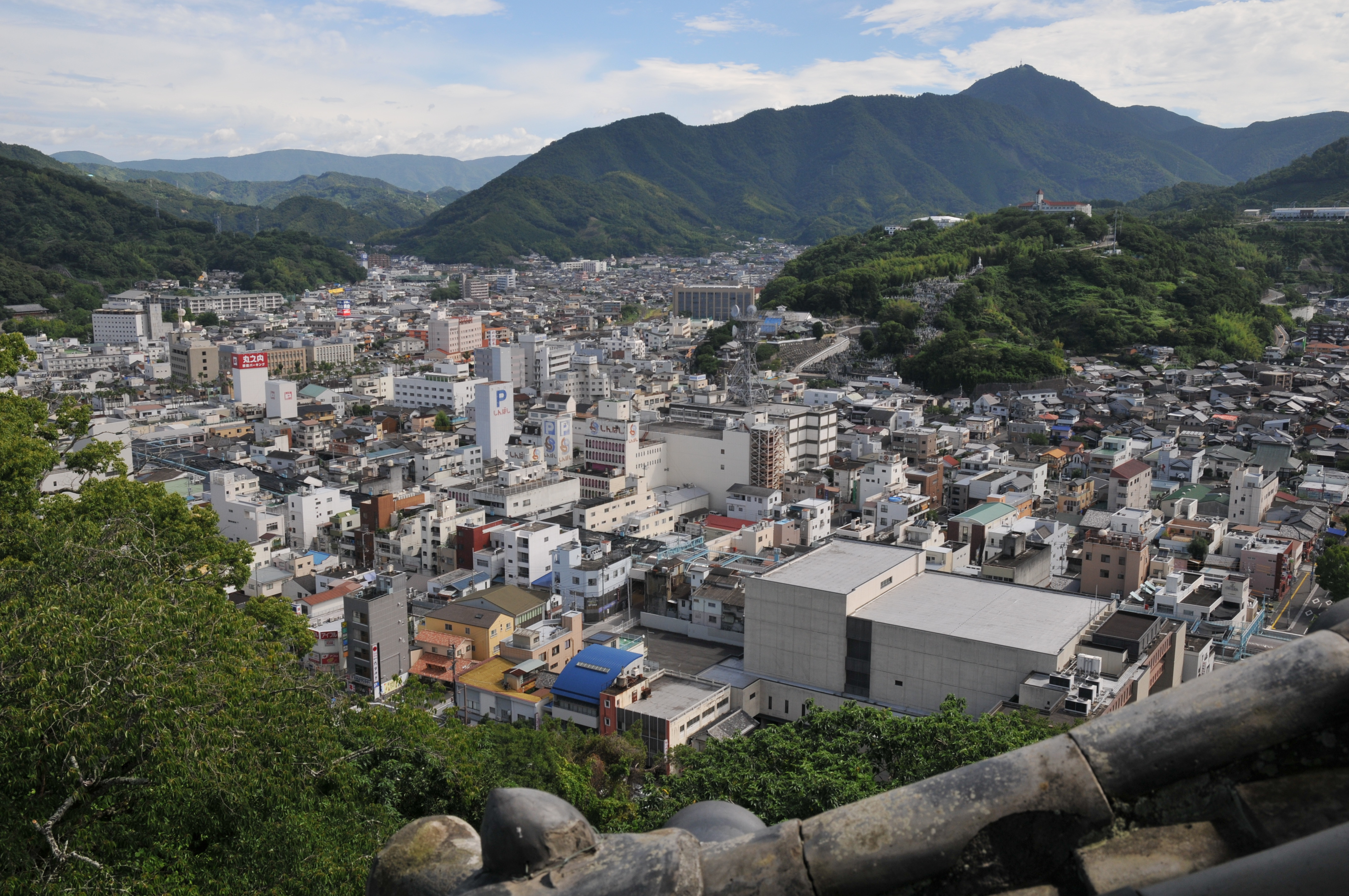
Uwajima

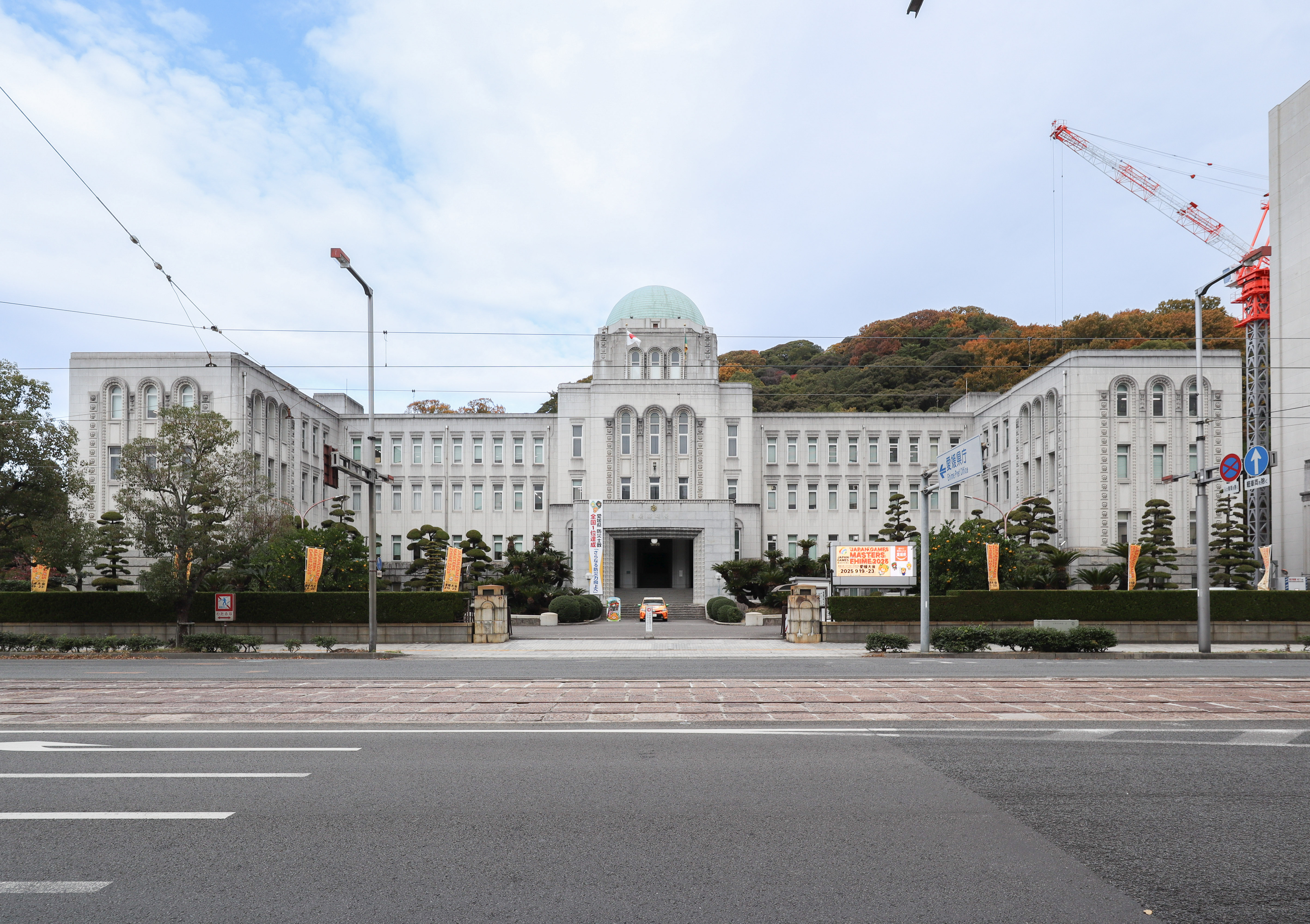
The Ehime Prefectural Capitol Building

Eleven cities are located in Ehime Prefecture:

Name		Area (km^{2})	Population (2020)	Map
Rōmaji	Kanji	Area (km^{2})	Population (2020)	Map
Imabari	今治市	419.56	151,672	
Iyo	伊予市	194.44	35,133	
Matsuyama (capital)	松山市	429.4	511,192	
Niihama	新居浜市	234.3	115,938	
Ōzu	大洲市	432.24	40,575	
Saijō	西条市	509.07	104,791	
Seiyo	西予市	514.78	35,388	
Shikokuchūō	四国中央市	421.24	82,754	
Tōon	東温市	211.45	33,903	
Uwajima	宇和島市	469.48	70,809	
Yawatahama	八幡浜市	133.03	31,987	

=== Towns and villages ===
These are the towns in each district:

Name		Area (km^{2})	Population (2020)	District	Map
Rōmaji	Kanji	Area (km^{2})	Population (2020)	District	Map
Ainan	愛南町	239.58	19,601	Minamiuwa District	
Ikata	伊方町	94.37	8,397	Nishiuwa District	
Kamijima	上島町	30.38	6,509	Ochi District	
Kihoku	鬼北町	241.87	9,682	Kitauwa District	
Kumakōgen	久万高原町	583.66	7,404	Kamiukena District	
Masaki	松前町	20.41	29,630	Iyo District	
Matsuno	松野町	98.5	3,674	Kitauwa District	
Tobe	砥部町	101.57	20,480	Iyo District	
Uchiko	内子町	299.5	15,322	Kita District	

=== Mergers ===
Former districts:

- Onsen District
- Shūsō District
- Uma District
- Uwa District (historical)

== Economy ==
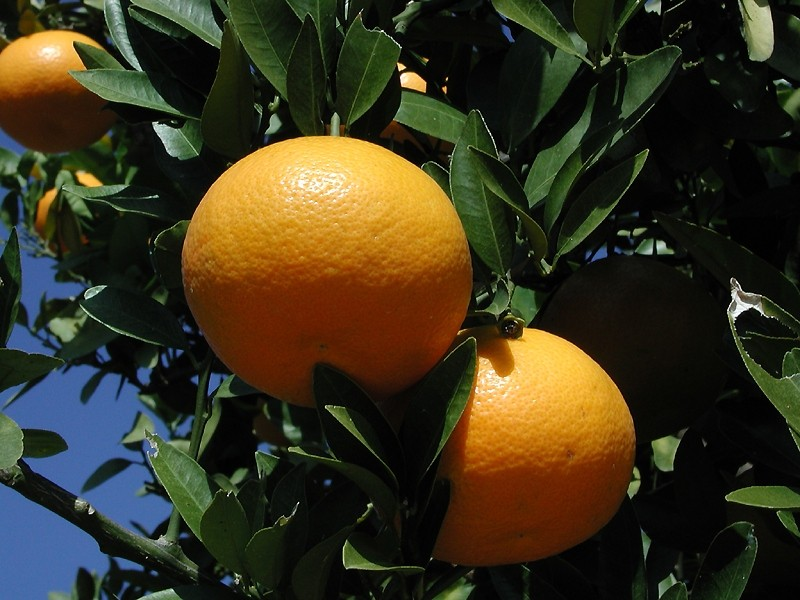
Iyokan

The coastal areas around Imabari and Saijō host a number of industries, including dockyards of Japan's largest shipbuilder, Imabari Shipbuilding. Chemical industries, oil refining, paper and cotton textile products also are a feature of the prefecture. Rural areas mostly engage in agricultural and fishing industries, and are particularly known for citrus fruits such as mikan (mandarin orange), iyokan and cultured pearls.

Ikata Nuclear Power Plant produces a large portion of Shikoku Electric Power.

== Education ==
=== Universities and colleges ===
==== National ====
- Ehime University

==== Prefectural ====
- Ehime Prefectural University of Health Science

==== Private ====
- Matsuyama Shinonome College (women's college)
- Matsuyama University
- St. Catherine University

=== Senior high schools ===
==== Prefectural ====
- Ehime Prefectural Matsuyama Central Senior High School
- Ehime Prefectural Matsuyama Higashi High School
- Ehime Prefectural Mishima High School
- Ehime Prefectural Uwajima Fisheries High School

== Sports ==
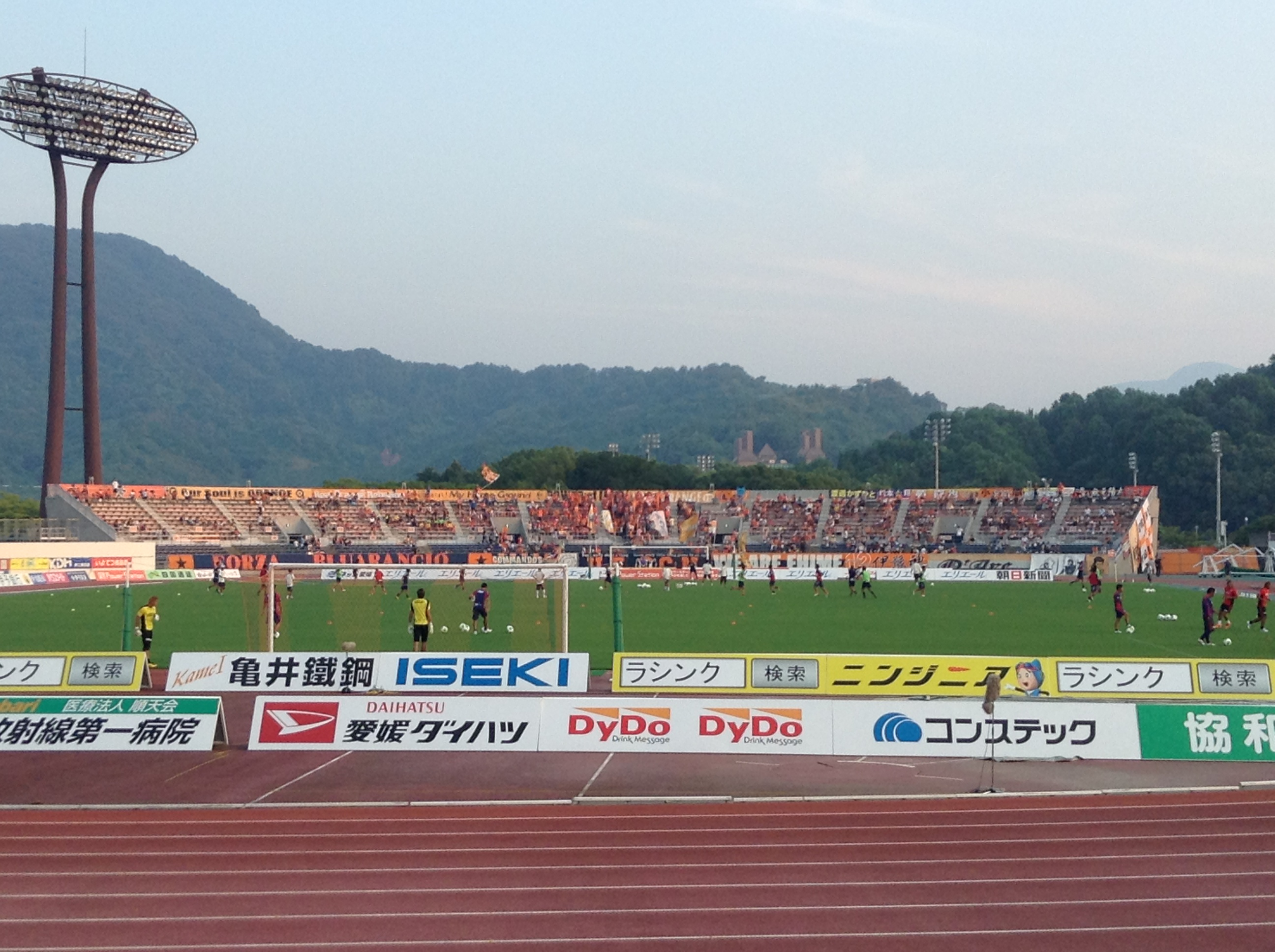
Ningineer Stadium.

The sports teams listed below are based in Ehime.

Association football:

- Ehime FC
- FC Imabari

Baseball:

- Ehime Mandarin Pirates

Basketball:

- Ehime Orange Vikings

== Culture ==
The oldest extant hot spring in Japan, Dōgo Onsen, is located in Matsuyama. It has been used for over two thousand years.

These are television shows and movies set in Ehime Prefecture.

- Tokyo Love Story is a story with characters are from Ehime Prefecture. Therefore, a lot of shooting was done in Ehime. Baishinji Station is famous for being filmed.
- Shodō Girls was made based on the true story of a high school student in Shikokuchūō. A member of the calligraphy club began doing Performance calligraphy at shopping malls and events to liven up the local region. After that, the Shodō Performance Koshien (書道パフォーマンス甲子園) was held in 2008.
- Botchan is a novel written by Natsume Sōseki. It was based on his experience in Matsuyama. Movies, dramas, and manga are published based on the novel. Botchan Ressha and Botchan Stadium are associated with this.
- Saka no Ue no Kumo is written by Ryōtarō Shiba. The main characters are Akiyama Yoshifuru, Akiyama Saneyuki and Masaoka Shiki, all of whom are from Ehime prefecture. It was broadcast on NHK as a TV drama.
- Koi wa Go・Hichi・Go！ (恋は五・七・五！) is set in Haiku Koshien, which is actually performed. The shooting was done at a high school, university, and library in Ehime. The haiku of this movie was supervised by Itsuki Natsui, haiku poet from Ehime.
- Destruction Babies (ディストラクション・ベイビーズ) is set in Ehime. This movie was made based on the true story that the director heard from a person he met when he visited Matsuyama. The director won an award at the Locarno Festival in 2016, and the film was selected as semi-grand prix at the Three Continents Festival in 2016.
- My-HiME is set in Ehime.

There are major festivals in Ehime Prefecture.

- Uwajima Ushi-oni Festival is held for three days, with a parade of many Ushi-oni walking around the city, a traditional Uwajima dance, a fireworks display, and a run on the final day.
- Niihama Taiko Festival is the autumn festival in Niihama. The drum stand is lifted by about 150 men. It is one of the three biggest fight festivals in Japan.
- The Matsuyama Autumn Festival includes a mikoshi event called Hachiawase (鉢合わせ) which takes place near Dōgo Onsen and Isaniwa Shrine.
- The Velo-city conference, the world's largest conference dedicated to daily cycling and active mobility, will be held in Ehime in 2027.

=== Hot springs ===
These are several hot springs (onsen) in Ehime Prefecture.

- Dōgo Onsen appears in the Nihon Shoki. This Hot Spring has three public baths: the main building, Tsubaki no Yu, and Asuka no Yu.
- Sora to Mori is a combined warm bath facility. There are hot springs, restaurants, and body care.
- Nibukawa Onsen is a hot spring located in Imabari. The source originates from the crevices of the Inugawa Valley in this hot spring town.

=== Language ===
Iyo dialect is a Japanese dialect spoken in Ehime Prefecture. Nanyo is influenced by the Kyushu dialect, and Chuyo and Toyo are influenced by the Kinki dialect.

=== Museums ===
- Kaimei School
- Museum of Ehime History and Culture

== Transport ==
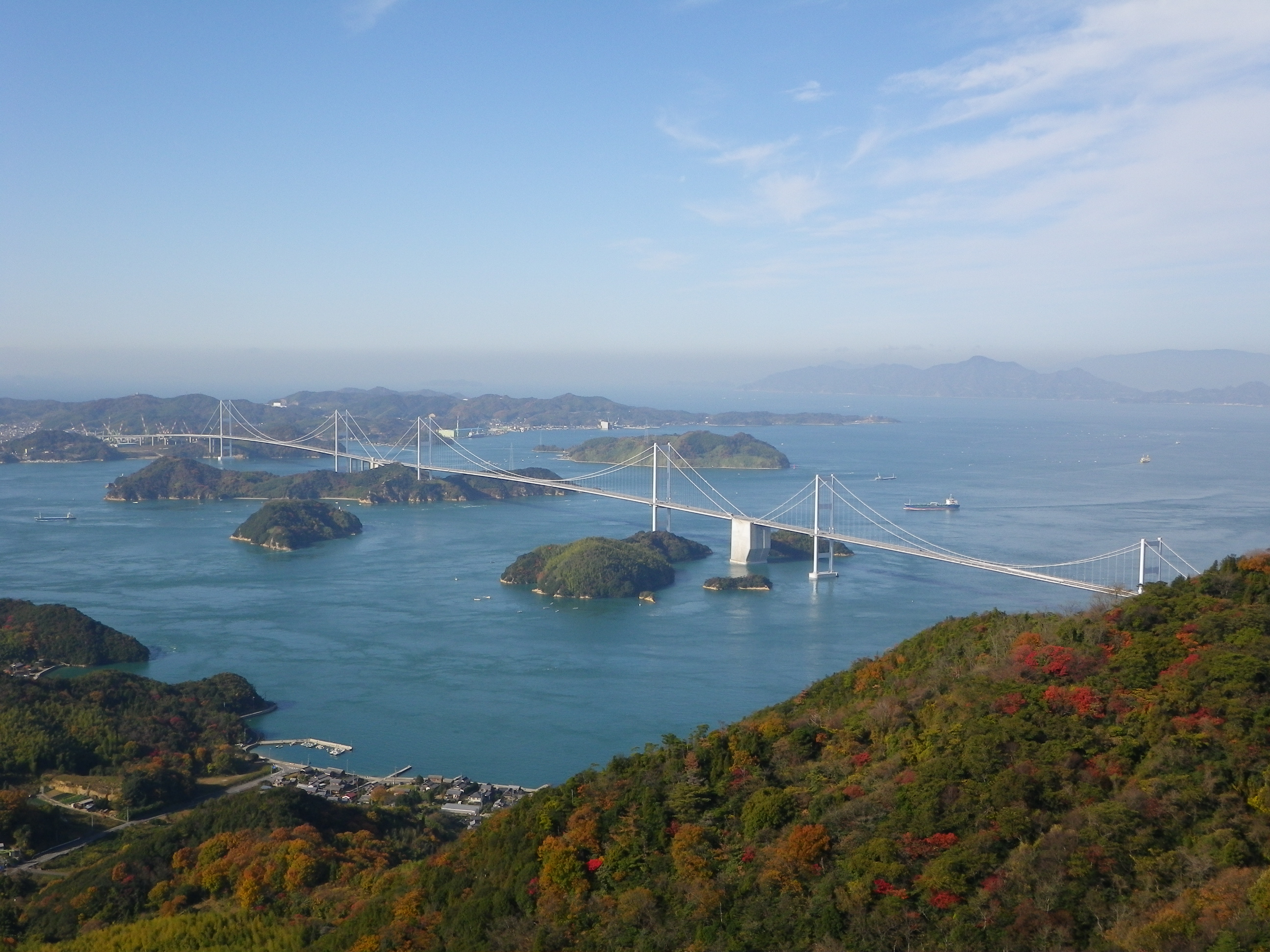
Kurushima Strait Bridge on the Shimanami Kaidō

=== Railway ===
- Shikoku Railway (JR Shikoku)
  - Yosan Line
  - Yodo Line
  - Uchiko Line
- Iyo Railway (Iyotetsu)
  - Gunchū Line
  - Takahama Line
  - Yokogawara Line
  - Matsuyama Inner Line

=== Road ===
==== Expressway ====
- Matsuyama Expressway
- Tokushima Expressway
- Takamatsu Expressway
- Kōchi Expressway
- Nishiseto Expressway (also referred to as the Shimanami Kaidō)
- Imabari-Komatsu Expressway

==== National highways ====
- National Route 11
- National Route 33 (Matsuyama-Kōchi)
- National Route 56 (Matsuyama-Iyo-Uwajima-Sukumo-Susaki-Kōchi)
- National Route 192 (Saijyo-Shikokuchūō-Yoshinogawa-Tokushima)
- National Route 194
- National Route 196
- National Route 197
- National Route 317 (Matsuyama-Imabari-Onomichi)
- National Route 319
- National Route 320
- National Route 378
- National Route 380
- National Route 437
- National Route 440
- National Route 441
- National Route 494 (Matsuyama-Niyodogawa-Susaki)

=== Ports ===
- Kawanoe Port
- Niihama Port - Ferry route to Osaka
- Toyo Port - Ferry route to Osaka
- Imabari Port - Ferry route to Innoshima, Hakata Island, and international container hub port
- Matsuyama Port - Ferry route to Kitakyushu, Yanai, Hiroshima, Kure, and international container hub port
- Yawatahama Port - Ferry route to Beppu, Usuki
- Misaki Port - Ferry route to Oita
- Uwajima Port

=== Airport ===
- Matsuyama Airport

== Notable people ==
- Kazuyoshi Ishii (born 1953), founder of Seidokaikan karate and K-1
- Tadashi Irie (born 1944), yakuza member
- Tomihiro Kono (born 1980), wig artist
- Daichi Kamada (born 1996), footballer
- Naoki Kuwata (born 1977), actor and model
- Tetchō Suehiro (1849–1896), politician, novelist and journalist

== International relations ==
Ehime Prefecture is making use of its long tradition of involvement with people overseas through international exchanges in areas such as the economy, culture, sports and education.

- British Columbia, Canada
- Dalian, China
- Hawaii, United States
- Liaoning, China
- New South Wales, Australia
- Queensland, Australia
