= Tobe ware =

Type of Japanese porcelain

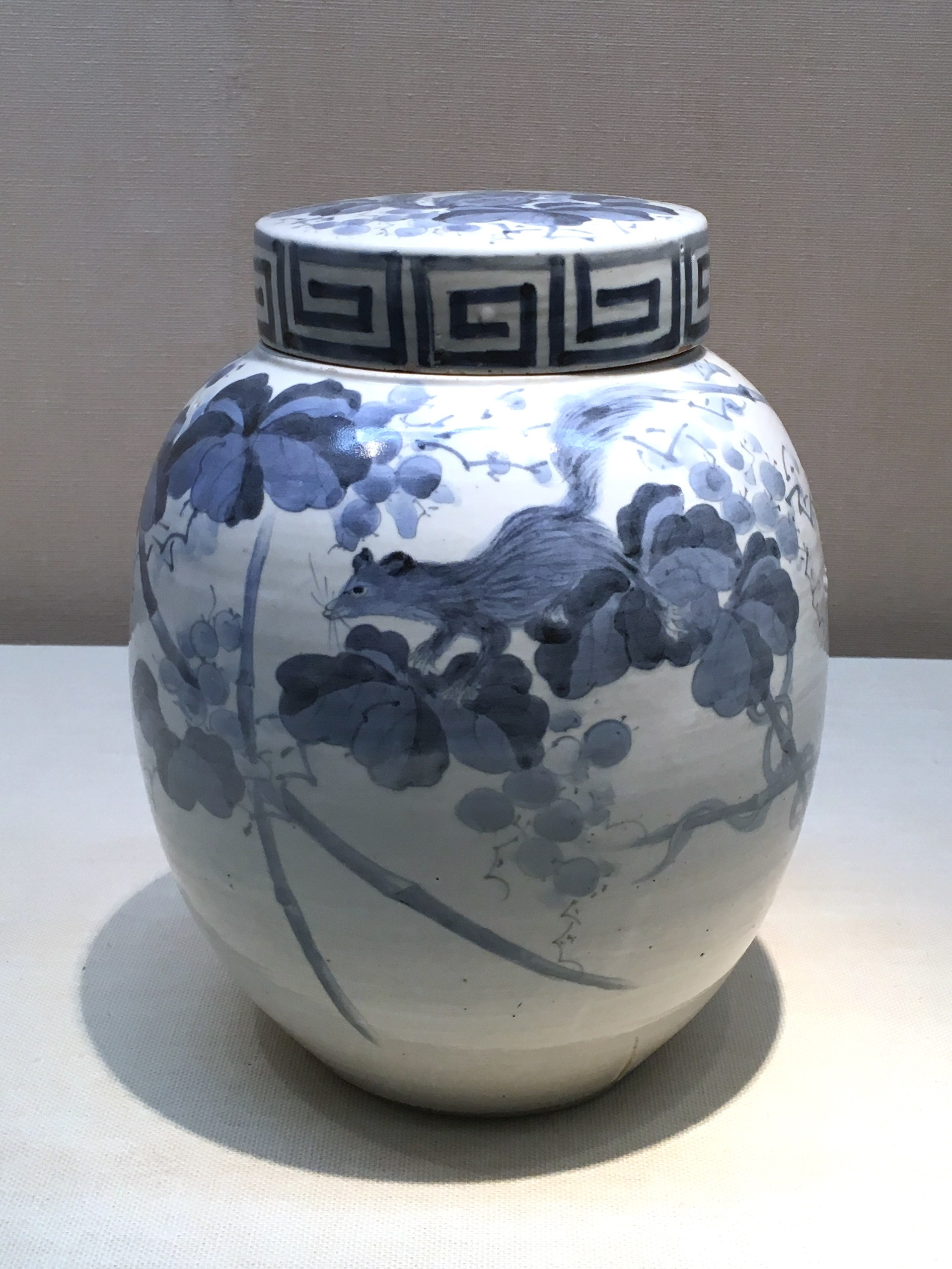
Tobe ware covered jar, grape and squirrel design, blue underglaze. Edo period, 19th century

Tobe ware (砥部焼, Tobe-yaki) is a type of Japanese porcelain traditionally from Tobe, Ehime, western Japan. It is of the sometsuke (染付) blue and white pottery type.

The ware started making its appearance when Katō Yasutoki, 9th lord of the Ōzu Domain (1769–1787), started hiring potters from Hizen. Production of white porcelain (hakuji) commenced in An'ei 6 (1777).

In 1976 it was officially designated by the government as a traditional crafts.

The products are characterized by a slightly thick, rugged base and fine brush strokes.

== See also ==
- List of Traditional Crafts of Japan
