= List of mergers in Ehime Prefecture =

Here is a list of mergers in Ehime Prefecture, Japan since the Heisei era.

== Mergers from April 1, 1999 to Present ==
- On April 1, 2003 - the village of Besshiyama (from Uma District) was merged into the expanded city of Niihama.
- On April 1, 2004 - the towns of Akehama, Nomura, Shirokawa and Uwa, (all from Higashiuwa District), and the town of Mikame (from Nishiuwa District) were merged to create the city of Seiyo. Higashiuwa District was dissolved as a result of this merger.
- On April 1, 2004 - the cities of Iyomishima and Kawanoe were merged with the town of Doi, and the village of Shingū (both from Uma District) to create the city of Shikokuchūō. Uma District was dissolved as a result of this merger.
- On August 1, 2004 - the town of Kuma, and the villages of Mikawa, Omogo and Yanadani (all from Kamiukena District) were merged to create the town of Kumakōgen.
- On September 21, 2004 - the towns of Kawauchi and Shigenobu (both from Onsen District) were merged to create the city of Tōon.
- On October 1, 2004 - the town of Yuge, and the villages of Ikina, Iwagi and Uoshima (all from Ochi District) were merged to create the new of Kamijima.
- On October 1, 2004 - the towns of Ipponmatsu, Jōhen, Mishō, Nishiumi and Uchiumi (all from Minamiuwa District) were merged to create the town of Ainan.
- On November 1, 2004 - the old city of Saijō absorbed the city of Tōyo, and the towns of Komatsu and Tanbara (both from Shūsō District) to create the new and expanded city of Saijō. Shūsō District was dissolved as a result of this merger.
- On January 1, 2005 - the village of Hirota (from Iyo District) was merged into the expanded town of Tobe.
- On January 1, 2005 - the town of Hiromi, and the village of Hiyoshi (both from Kitauwa District) were merged to create the town of Kihoku.
- On January 1, 2005 - the town of Ikazaki (from Kita District), and the town of Oda (from Kamiukena District) were merged into the expanded town of Uchiko.
- On January 1, 2005 - the city of Hōjō, and the town of Nakajima (from Onsen District) were merged into the expanded city of Matsuyama. Onsen District was dissolved as a result of this merger.
- On January 11, 2005 - the towns of Hijikawa and Nagahama, and the village of Kawabe (all from Kita District) were merged into the expanded city of Ōzu.
- On January 16, 2005 - the old city of Imabari absorbed the towns of Hakata, Kamiura, Kikuma, Miyakubo, Namikata, Ōmishima, Ōnishi, Tamagawa, and Yoshiumi, and the villages of Asakura and Sekizen (all from Ochi District) to create the new and expanded city of Imabari. With this merger, there are no more villages left in Ehime Prefecture.
- On March 28, 2005 - the town of Honai (from Nishiuwa District) was merged into the expanded city of Yawatahama.
- On April 1, 2005 - the city of Iyo absorbed the towns of Futami and Nakayama (both from Iyo District) to form the new city of Iyo.
- On April 1, 2005 - the towns of Misaki and Seto (both from Nishiuwa District) were merged into the expanded town of Ikata.
- On August 1, 2005 - the old city of Uwajima absorbed the towns of Mima, Tsushima and Yoshida (all from Kitauwa District) to create the new and expanded city of Uwajima.
