= Ushi-oni =

Type of yokai in Japanese mythology and folklore

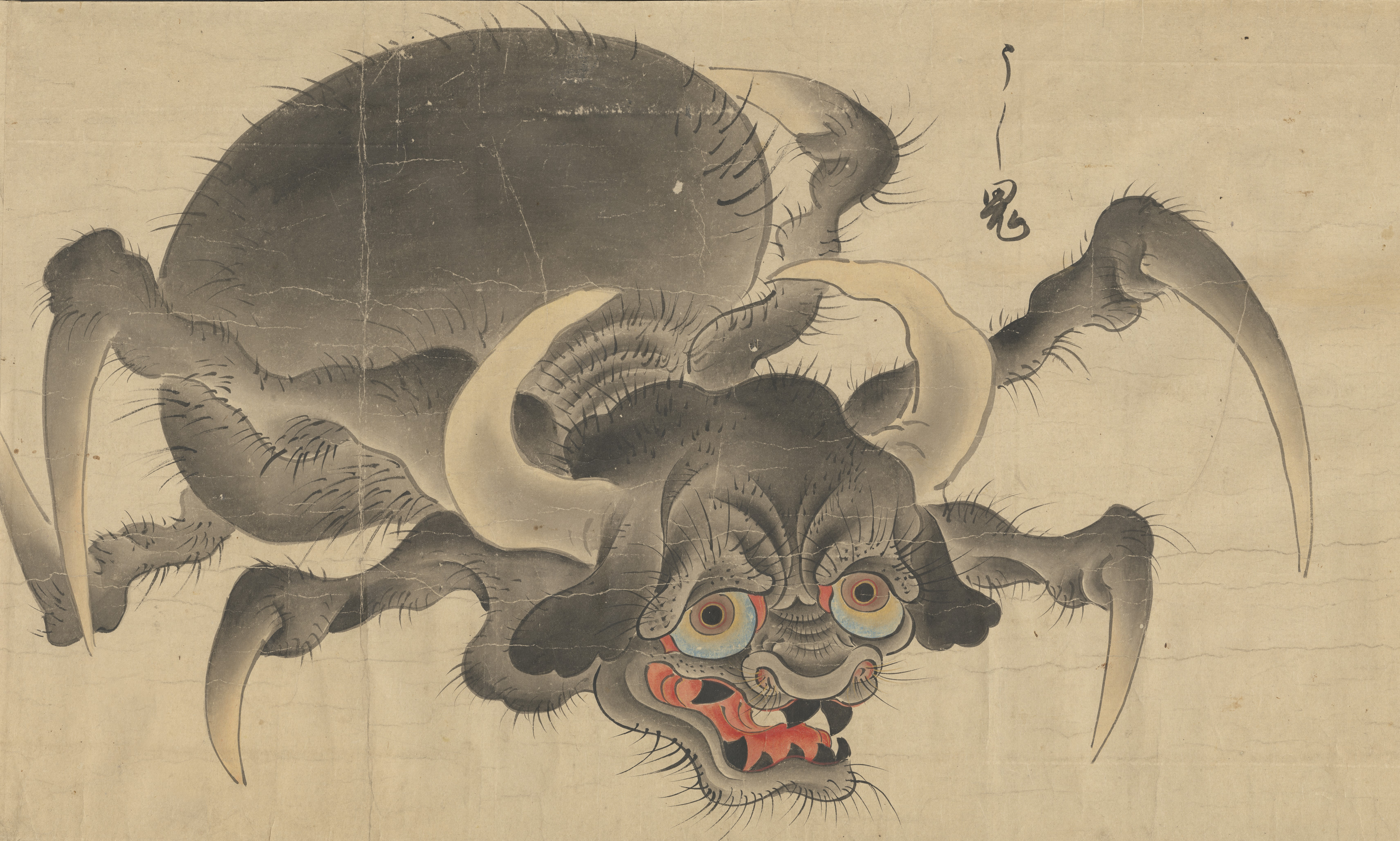
Ushi-oni, from Bakemono no e scroll, Brigham Young University

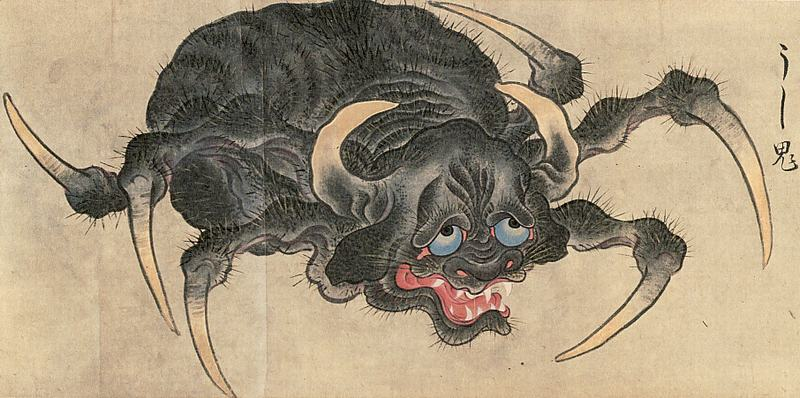
"Ushi-oni" (うし鬼) from the Hyakkai Zukan by Sawaki Suushi

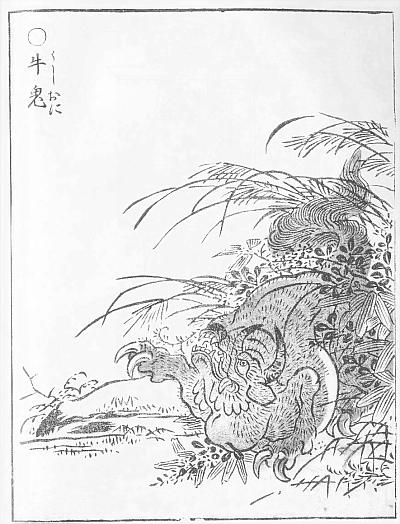
"Ushi-oni" (牛鬼) from the Gazu Hyakki Yagyō by Sekien Toriyama

The ushi-oni (牛鬼; ox oni; ox demon), or gyūki, is a yōkai from the folklore of western Japan. The folklore describes more than one kind of ushi-oni, but the depiction of a bovine-headed monster occurs in most. Ushi-oni generally appear on beaches and attack people who walk there.

== Description ==
Ushi-oni have brutal, savage personalites. Their appearance varies, mainly based on geographical location. They usually have an ox's head with sharp upward-curving horns, wicked fangs and a slender tongue. They spit poison and enjoy killing and eating humans. Their body is most commonly depicted as spider-like with six legs and long singular claws at the end of each appendage.

In other descriptions, they have the head of an ox and an oni's torso. Certain legends claim that they appear in front of temple gates in the mountains wearing human clothing, or flying with the wings of an insect. Other ushi-oni have a reverse appearance, with an oni's head and an ox's body.

They are said to appears in beaches, in mountains, in forests, in rivers, in swamps, and in lakes. They often appear in stream pools, and in the Kinki region and Shikoku among other places, there are many places names such as "ushi-oni fuchi" (ushi-oni stream pool) or "ushi-oni taki" (ushi-oni waterfall).

In yōkai emaki of the Edo Period such as the Hyakkai Zukan, they are most often shown with the bovine head and a spider torso. In the Hyakki Yagyō Emaki, a similar picture goes under the title of Tsuchigumo.

== Legends by area ==
=== Mie Prefecture ===
The ushi-oni is considered to curse the Mie Prefecture. It is said that there was once an ushi-oni in the caves of Gokasho-ura, Minamiise, and when the lord of the Gokasho castle, Aisu Shigeaki shot it with a bow, the seishitsu (lord's wife) fell sick with an incurable illness due to the curse. Because of this, Shigeaki distanced himself from the seishitsu, and developed an infatuation for a shirabyōshi (dancer) who came from the capital. As a result, the seishitsu's parents, Kitabatake, came to have bad relations with the Aisu, and ended up ruining the Aisu.

=== Wakayama Prefecture ===
The ushi-oni stream pool in Nishimuro District connects to the sea at its bottom, and when the water gets dirty, people would say "the ushi-oni is there." Just encountering this ushi-oni would result in catching an illness. It is said that by saying opposites like "rocks flow, leaves sink, oxen neigh, and horses bellow," one's life can be saved. The ushi-oni of this land possess a catlike body that is springy like a ball with a tail at a length of 1 shaku (about 3.3 meters) or more, and therefore do not make sound as they walk.

It is said that there is an ushi-oni at the waterfall basin in Wado River. People who have their shadows licked by one would get a high fever and die in a few days, and to avoid this, one can provide the ushi-oni with its favorite thing, some alcohol, every year at new years.

The tale about the yōkai at Mio River pool is an extremely unusual story about an ushi-oni who would shapeshift into a human, and even help a human. A young lad shared his bentō with a woman, who was the shapeshifted master of the stream pool, the ushi-oni, and when this young lad was washed away by a flood two months later, he was saved by the shapeshifted ushi-oni. However, it is said that an ushi-oni who saves a human must leave this world in exchange, so as the ushi-oni was saving the young lad, deep red blood sprang out from the ushi-oni's body as it melted and disappeared.

In Wakayama Prefecture, ushi-oni are mountain-dwelling beasts. Legend says when a hiker or traveler makes eye contact with the ushi-oni, the person cannot avert his or her gaze. The person's soul or energy is drained and he or she dies. This is called "Kage wo kuu (影を食う)" or sometimes "Kage wo nomu (影を飲む)", which translates to "eating the shadow" or "drinking the soul".

=== Okayama Prefecture ===
In tales told in Ushimado (now Setouchi), when Empress Jingū invaded the three Korean kingdoms, an eight-headed ox-shaped monster called Jinrinki attacked her, and she shot and killed it with an arrow. Jinrinki separated into head, torso, and tail, which became Ushimado's islands of Kishima (yellow island), Maejima (front island), and Aojima (blue island). As the empress returned from Silla, Jinrinki, who was not able to go in peace, turned into an ushi-oni and attacked again. The Sumiyoshi sanjin grabbed the ushi-oni by the horn and threw it away. After the ushi-oni was eliminated, it is said its body fell into pieces and became the islands of Kuroshima (black island), Naka no Kojima (middle small island), and Hashi no Kojima (side small island). The name "Ushimado" is considered to be from an accented form of calling this place of legend the "Ushimarobi" (the place where the ox fell). Also, in the Hachiman Gudōkun, which introduced the authority of Hachiman who was established in the Kamakura period, there are writings about an oni called Jinrin who fought with Emperor Chūai, and this is considered to be the origin of the aforementioned legend.

The Sakuyōshi (作陽志), at the Ōhira Mountain in Koshihata, Tomata District, Mimisaka Province (now Tomata District) mentions a paranormal phenomenon that it called "gyūki" (牛鬼). In the Kan'ei period, a villager girl just 20 years old had a child with a self-professed government official, but this child's fangs grew long, and became like an ushi-oni complete with a tail and horns, so the parents killed and skewered this child with a cast skewer to be exposed by the roadside. The folklorist Kunio Yanagita states that this is a once-deified mountain god who fell and became seen as a yōkai.

=== San'in region ===
On the coast from the San'in region to northern Kyushu, they are said to appear from the sea together with the nure-onna and iso-onna. It is said that a woman carrying a baby would stop someone and ask them to hold the baby; when this person holds the baby, the baby would become heavy like a stone, making the person unable to move, and the ushi-oni would use this chance to kill and eat that person. They are said to shapeshift themselves into women to approach people, but it is said that even after having shapeshifted, their reflection on the waterfront will still be that of an ushi-oni, so that is how one can discover their true identity. Likewise, in Iwami (now Shimane Prefecture), an angler was approached by a strange woman embracing a baby, who asked, "can you please hold on to this baby for a bit?" After he took hold of the baby, it looked like the woman disappeared, whereupon ushi-oni came forth from the sea, and the baby in his arms became a stone so heavy that fleeing was impossible. His family's inscribed sword passed down through generations came flying and pierced the ushi-oni's neck, thus making a narrow escape from death. The ushi-oni is also related to the origin of certain place names, and the island of Ushijima in Hikari, Yamaguchi Prefecture is said to be because an ushi-oni appeared there.

=== Kōchi Prefecture ===
In Meiwa 3 (1776), in a year of drought in the village of Okanouchi (now Kami), a man named Jirōkichi was said to have witnessed an ushi-oni at the river Mine no Kawa. In a tale from this prefecture, in a certain village, the livestock ox was killed and eaten by ushi-oni. The villagers who tried to slay it were also killed and eaten, and a warrior of Chikamori Sakon who heard of this slew it with a single arrow shot. The villagers were overjoyed, and it is said that the villagers would imitate pulling an arrow while telling about how the ushi-oni was slain, and this is considered the origin of this prefecture's festival, the Momotesai.

In the legends of Azahodo field in Monobe (now Kami), it is said that an old lady who lived around the area rescued a crying ushi-oni who fell and was trapped in a pot-shaped bowl about 2–3 ken deep, and after that, the ushi-oni never cursed these lands again.

In Tosayama, there is a tributary of the Kagami River called the Shigekura River where there is a stream pool called the ushi-oni pool. Once, when it was known as the koke (moss) pool, an ushi-oni lived in it. A hunter from the village of Hase went out to hunt animals in their wallows, when he encountered an ushi-oni with a body height of 7 shaku, the body of an ox, and the head of an oni, so the hunter killed it. The ushi-oni fell into the stream pool and let out blood for 7 days and nights, and after that, bones with a length of about 7 shaku floated up. A small shrine was built and enshrined, so the shrine was called "Kawauchi-sama" and koke pool became called the ushi-oni pool.

=== Ehime Prefecture ===
The legend of the ushi-oni at Uwajima is one of the most well known among all the ushi-oni legends. Once, an ushi-oni attacked people and livestock, so a yamabushi from Kawabe, Kita District was called to slay it. Facing off with the ushi-oni in the village, the yamabushi blew a conch and chanted a mantra, whereupon the ushi-oni recoiled. The yamabushi thrust a sword between its eyebrows and proceeded to cut its body into pieces. The ushi-oni's blood flowed for 7 days and nights, becoming a stream pool. Various places called "ushi-oni fuchi" (ushi-oni stream pool) – one at Tosayama, Kōchi Prefecture, one at Shirakiyama, Tokushima Prefecture, and one at Negoro-ji, Kagawa Prefecture – are said to be where this took place.

Another theory is that the ushi-oni that infested Ehime Prefecture had the head of an ox and the body of a whale. Despite being legends under the same name of "ushi-oni", they have remarkable variety in appearance, which has led the yōkai researcher Bintarō Yamaguchi to state that large monsters that come from the sea may all have been called ushi-oni.

In the Uwajima Domain, the shrine, Warei-jinja, built on the occasion of a house strife called the Warei Sōdō, holds the Ushi-oni Festival on July 23 and 24. Something like the dragon dancers at a Chinese New Year celebration, this ushi-oni is represented with a huge, multiple-person costume with a cloth body and a carved, painted head held upon a pole. It has an oni-like head, a long neck, and the body of an ox. The body is either red or brown with shaggy hair similar to the coat of a yak. A short sword replaces its tail.

=== Tsubaki root theory ===
There is a theory that the ushi-oni is actually an aged tsubaki root. There are legends in Japan that divine spirits dwell in Tsubaki, so there is the interpretation that the ushi-oni is an incarnation of this spirit, and there are customs where they are honored for warding off evil spirits. Also, tsubaki has been viewed as a special, holy flower that grows in sanctuaries in the final reaches of capes and shores, and since tsubaki flowers bloom at the boundaries, there is the theory that this expresses the place where ushi-oni appear. Both the accompanying nure-onna and the ushi-oni appear from the shores, and do not come from anywhere else.

=== Shimane Prefecture, Iwami Area (島根県石見) ===
Another well-known ushi-oni is a massive, brutal sea-monster which lives off the coast of Shimane Prefecture and other places in Western Japan and attacks fishermen. It is often depicted with a spider- or crab-like body. This ushi-oni seems to be connected to another monster called the nure-onna, who sometimes appears before an ushi-oni attack and tricks the victim into holding her child, which then becomes stuck to the person's hands and grows heavier in order to hinder escape.

==== Izumo Region (出雲) ====
The appearance of the ushi-oni in the Izumo region according to some legends differs radically compared to the other legends. This bakemono resembles a shining, white butterfly instead of an ox. This version of the ushi-oni appears in groups and sticks to travelers' bodies when they cross bridges on humid, rainy days.

=== Kagawa Prefecture, Takamatsu City (香川県高松市) ===
Yet another ushi-oni is depicted as a statue on the grounds of the Negoroji temple in Takamatsu, Kagawa Prefecture. It is a bipedal monster with huge tusks, spurred wrists, and membranes like a flying squirrel. A sign nearby explains that this creature terrorized the area about four-hundred years ago, and was slain by a skilled archer by the name of Yamada Kurando Takakiyo (山田蔵人高清). He dedicated its horns to the temple, and they can still be seen to this day.

=== Kyoto, Kumihama Bay (京都府久美浜湾) ===
When night fishing in Kumihama Bay of Kyoto, a voice is heard by fishermen beckoning them from the opposite shore. Upon arriving to the other shore, however, no one is there. The voice is then heard from the original shore. After chasing the voice around for a while, the fisherman returns to his boat, only to find all the fish that were in the boat are gone. This terror is attributed to the ushi-oni.

=== Tokushima Prefecture, Shirokiyama Village (徳島県白木山) ===
Legend says that Shirokiyama village and its people were terrorized by an ushi-oni. It was defeated by a famous warrior.

== Classical literature ==
Folk tales about ushi-oni are told in western Japan, but in classical literature, there are many statements about a yōkai similar to the ushi-oni appearing around Asakusa.

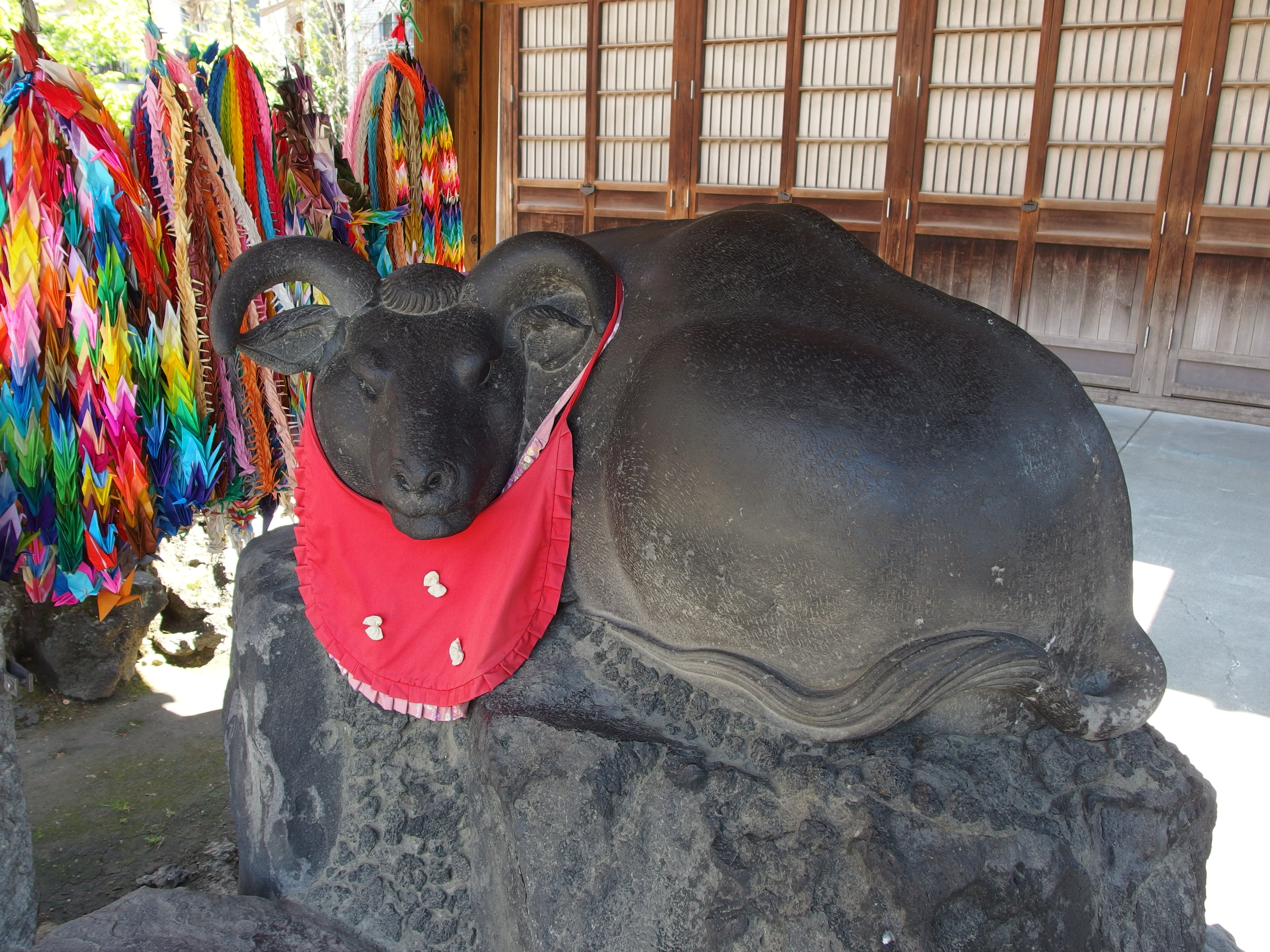
Nadeushi at the Ushijima Jinja in Sumida, Tokyo

In writings such as the Azuma Kagami from the Kamakura Period, there is the following legend. In Kenchō 3 (1251), an ox-like yōkai appeared at Sensō-ji, and the 24 monks in the dining room was affected by its evil intent and fell ill, 7 of whom died. The Shinpen Musashi Fudoki Kō quotes from the Azuma Kagami and states that an ushi-oni-like yōkai appears at Sumida River, who jumped at the Ushijima Shrine opposite the river from Asakusa, and left behind an orb called the "ushi-tama", or "ox orb". This ushi-tama became a shrine treasure, and the ushi-oni was deified as a god. At this shrine, instead of komainu (guardian dogs), it instead is decorated with a pair of komaushi (guardian oxen). It also has a nadeushi (petting ox) statue, and it is thought that by petting it on an area where one's own self is not well, the illness can be cured. Considering how "Gozu-Tennō" (ox-head king of skies) is sometimes thought to be another name for Susanoo, and Susanoo's harsh personality, there is the theory that this ushi-oni is an incarnation of Susanoo, and the yōkai researcher Kenji Murakami states that Ushi Gozen's attack on the temple comes from a backdrop of a religious confrontation.

Their name is mentioned in The Pillow Book under the name of "Oroshiki Mono" ("Fearful Thing") in section 148, and their face-off with Minamoto no Yorimitsu is also depicted in the Taiheiki.

In the beginning of the Edo Period, according to an old jōruri called "Ushi Gozen no Ohonchi" (Ushi Gozen's Original Place), the wife of Minamoto no Mitsunaka, from a powerful family of the Heian period, had a dream where the Kitano Tenjin dwelt in her womb. After a long pregnancy of 3 years and 3 months, a boy infant was born on an ox year, on an ox day, at the ox hour. This infant would be Minamoto no Yorimitsu's next younger sibling (in the original text, らいくわうの御しやてい "raikwau no oshatei", or ただの満中が次男, "tada no Mitsunaka ga jinan"), but he had an ox's horns and an oni's face, so he was about to be killed. However, the court lady who was ordered to perform the killing instead saved him and raised him in secret in the mountains, and grew up to be called "Ushi Gozen." Mitsunaka ordered his son, the yōkai-slaying hero Minamoto no Yorimitsu, to deal with Ushi Gozen. Ushi Gozen fought many battles in Kantō and resisted to the end. He threw himself in the Sumida River, where it is said that he transformed into an ox 30 meters (about ten jō) in length and went insane.

== As atmospheric ghost lights ==
In an essay titled Isetsu Machimachi (異説まちまち) by Wada Masamichi, a warrior of the Sekiyado Domain, there are statements about ushi-oni as atmospheric ghost lights. According to this essay, in Izumo Province (now the northern parts of Shimane Prefecture), at a damp time of continual rain, if one goes to a place where there appears to be a bridge across a mountain stream where some white lights would fly about and stick to the body and not come off, one would say "I have encountered ushi-oni," and it is said to disappear by warming oneself at a hearth. This is thought to be similar to the atmospheric ghost light called minobi in Niigata Prefecture and Shiga Prefecture.

In legends of Inaba Province (now the eastern part of Tottori Prefecture), on snowy evenings, countless small firefly-like lights would collect on one's mino, and if one tries to shake them off, they would fall to the floor and then whirl up again and stick on. It is said that eventually, the mino and umbrella would all be covered with a green light.

== Relics ==
In Anan, Tokushima Prefecture, a family called Kajima has enshrined a beast's skull told to have come from an ushi-oni. It is said that the Kajima family's ancestor's slew this ushi-oni upon request from the local farmers who were being tormented by it, and then brought back its head.

In Kurume, Fukuoka Prefecture, a mummified hand at the Kan'onji is said to be the hand of an ushi-oni that appeared one year in Kōhei (1063). It had an ox's head and an oni's body, and it tormented the nearby residents with a supernatural power. It is said that although the warriors of several provinces hesitated to slay it, the head priest Kanamitsu Shōnin slew it with nenbutsu and Buddhist power. It is said that the hand went to temple, the head was presented at the capital, and the ears were buried at Minōsan ("ear storage mountain"). The name Minōsan comes from this legend.

At Negoro-ji on Aonomine, Goshikidai in Kagawa Prefecture, there are some treasured horns said to be from an ushi-oni slain by Yamada Kudando Takakiyo near the start of the Edo Period. According to the pictures in the scrolls of this temple, this ushi-oni had the head of a monkey and the body of a tiger, and both legs is a flying membrane-shaped wing like that of a musasabi or bat. The scroll and relic is currently not open to the public due to several problems, so it is open to the public only through the internet.

There are records that there were once ushi-oni around Kumakōgen, Ehime Prefecture, but none remain today.

== In festivals ==
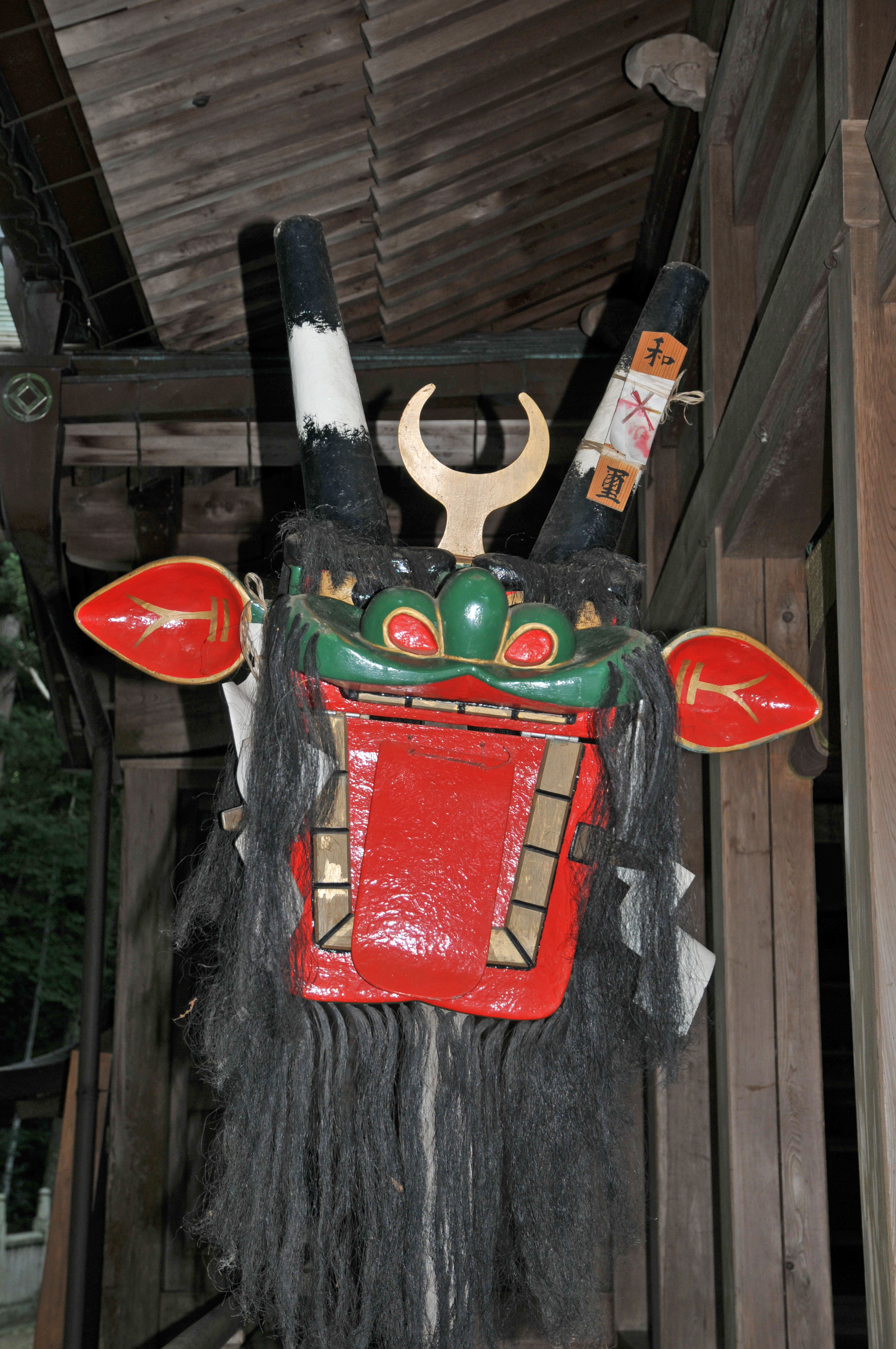
Ushi-oni mask at the Warei-jinja at Uwajima

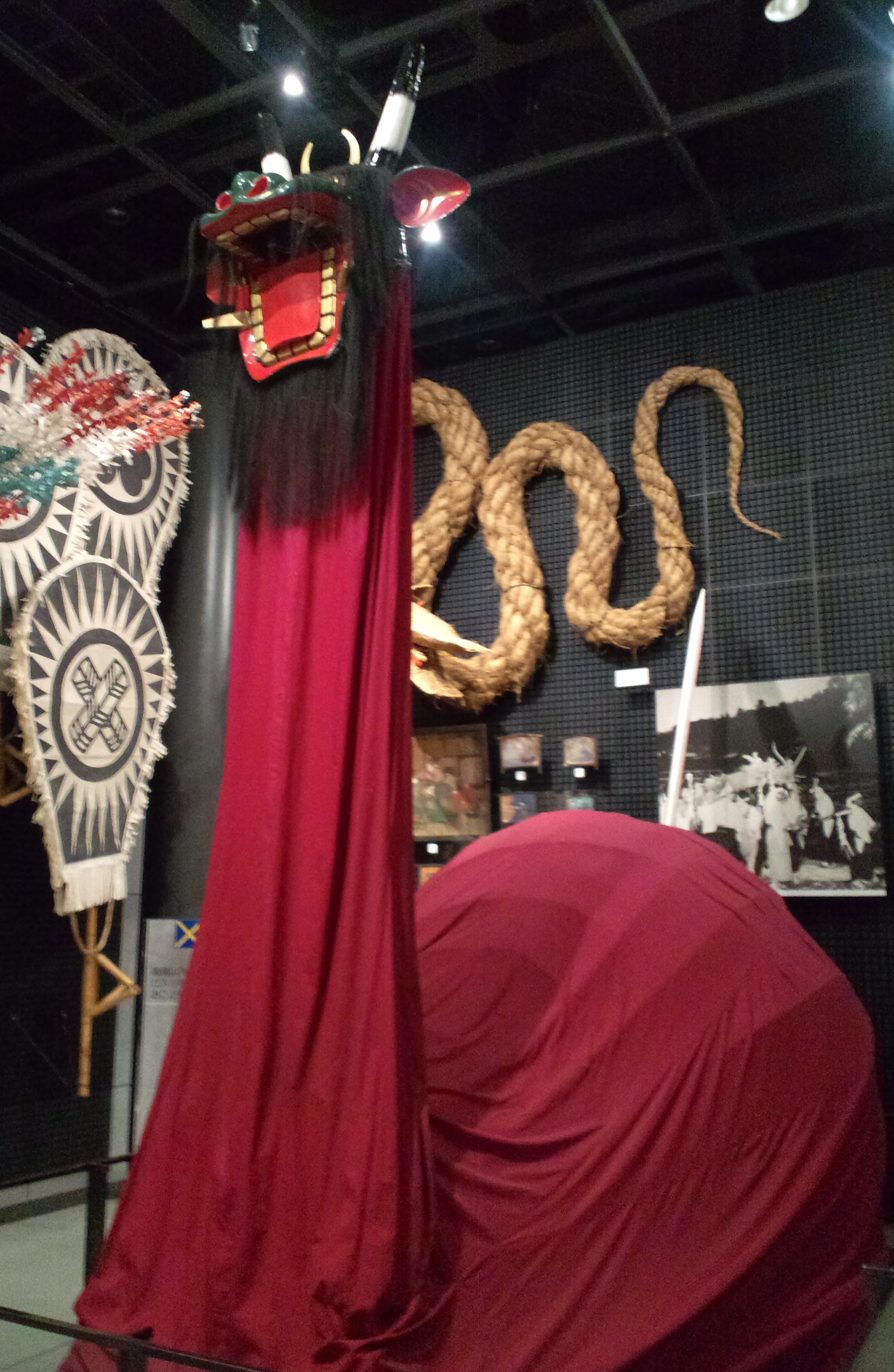
The ushi-oni dashi (National Museum of Ethnology, Suita, Osaka)

In the Nanyo Region of Ehime Prefecture, especially Uwajima and its surroundings, there is a local festival in which a procession of dashi (parade floats) called ushi-oni are paraded. There are several explanations suggested for the origin of this, including the aforementioned view of ushi-oni being holy, an Iyo Province story of how Tōnai Zusho and Kuraki Heinojō slew an ushi-oni, a story about how a person from Iyo slew the ushi-oni in Kaifu District, Tokushima Prefecture, and a story about how when Toyotomi Hideyoshi dispatched troops to Korea, Katō Kiyomasa made "turtle shell carts" to the tigers of Korea.

=== Shape ===
The cart is a turtle shell-shaped structure made from putting together bamboo, with an attached head (officially the "trunk") and tail ("sword"). The "trunk" is attached several meters ahead on bamboo, and on the other side is attached a T-shaped handle ("shumoku", or "bell-ringing rod"), which can be freely moved about. It is considered an honor to handle this. Depending on the region, some of them feature an ability to extend or contract the neck. The "sword" is attached to the main body by a rope. A large number of people would carry this and parade it about. At the same time, they would furiously shake the "trunk" and "sword", spin it around again and go into a fervor. However, they would not make them bump into each other or perform other kinds of "fights". Generally, there are two types of main bodies, one covered by a shuro (considered the original kind), and one covered by a black or red cloth (considered the development kind). The one with the shuro is the smaller one. The development kind has a shiny yellow thing in its center.

Furthermore, there is a saying that "if children can get the ushi-oni to bite their head, they'll become smart," so when the people carrying it are resting, the people nearby would take their children and grandchildren along to get their heads bit.

=== Festivals ===
The ushi-oni plays the main role in the festival of the Uwajima region. In the Warei Festival performed from July 22 to 24, ushi-oni would take the stage not just in Uwajima, but also in the mountain regions and in Kōchi Prefecture (Nishitosa). These are made by the city staff of Uwajima and the ushi-oni preservation societies of various regions. Also, ushi-oni appear in autumn festivals (such as small scale festivals in Akehama, Seiyo, among other places). Following the example of the Ehime Prefecture festival, ushi-oni also appear in events in many areas, such as alongside the taiko floats of Niihama, or alongside danjiri carts in Saijo.

Since Uwajima become a sister city to Honolulu, Hawaii, every year on the first Friday, Saturday, and Monday is the Matsuri in Hawaii: Pan-Pacific Festival where volunteers from the Maruho Ushi-oni Preservation Society and the Uwajima City Government Ushi-oni Preservation Society would participate as the Uwajima Ushi-oni Preservation Society.

In the Nanyo region, they would be at the front of mikoshi and are said to play the role of warding off devils. Ushi-oni also appear in festivals in the Cape Sada region, Mikame, Seiyo, the Kita District, among other places.

=== Other ===
==== Ushi-oni mask (kabu) ====
On the premises of the Uwajima Station on the JR Yosan Line is an ushi-oni "kabu" displayed as decoration. Besides this, in regional cuisine establishments in the Uwajima region are sometimes decorated with things modeled after an ushi-oni "kabu." They can also be sometimes seen at Uwajima eating establishments in Matsuyama.

==== The ushi-oni of Kikuma ====
The autumn festival held at the Kamo Jinja in Kikuma, Imabari is the only one in the Tōyo region where ushi-oni appear. It dons a black cloth and is somewhat large with a round torso.

Besides Ehime Prefecture, on Amami Ōshima, there is the ushi-oni belief festival called the "Numato Nukanushi", where an ox yōkai god (farming god) with decorated countless eight-horned, eight-footed, and eight-tailed madara-shaped patterns would rise up from the sea and shout with a loud charamela-like voice and roam about the basket fires, whereupon the islanders would put their heads to the ground when it comes to them. However, this is actually a made-up god, and the islanders hate it when people from the mainland mention this to them.

There are also similar ushi-oni and ox god festivals in Minamitakaki District, Nagasaki Prefecture (now Unzen) known called "Tōshimon", in Uwajima, Ehime Prefecture called "Ushōnin", and in Ichiki, Hioki District, Kagoshima Prefecture (now Ichikikushikino) called "Tsukuimon". Similarly, at a town along the Kagoshima Bay in the Ōsumi Peninsula there is said to be something called the "unmushi" (sea ox), a monster black ox that would crawl up from the ocean and wander about. This unmushi is thought to appear after the bon festival on the 27th, so the people of this area would avoid the sea on this day.

The comic artist Mizuki Shigeru surmises that in the backdrop of the ushi-oni are the ancient Indian ox gods, so the incarnations of Daijizaiten (Shiva), Izanaten (Ishana) and Enma-ten (Yama) are related, and that also related is the existence of the Tenmangū that shrines Sugawara no Michizane (who is also Tenman Daijizaiten).

== In popular culture ==
- The Super Sentai franchise has its adaption of the ushi-oni:
  - In Ninja Sentai Kakuranger, the ushi-oni appears as a monster an ox dressed as a cowboy. It was unused in Mighty Morphin Power Rangers, but it did make cameos in Power Rangers Lost Galaxy.
  - In Samurai Sentai Shinkenger, the monster Gozunagumo is depicted as a spider monster with an ox head on its torso drawing inspiration from the ushi-oni. He was adapted into Power Rangers Samurai as Arachnitor.
- Elements of ushi-oni appear in One Piece:
  - Gyūki: Yuzume is the name of an attack Zoro uses to defeat T-Bone.
  - One of the Five Elders, St. Jaygarcia Saturn, possesses an unnamed Mythical Zoan Devil Fruit that transforms him into a gyuki where his Awakened form gives him ox-like horns and spider-like legs.
- In both the Nurarihyon no Mago manga and anime series, the beast known as Gyūki happens to be an ushi-oni with the head of an ox and the torso of a spider-like creature with large claws that with its demonic powers would lead lost travelers astray and prey on them.
- In Naruto, Gyūki is Killer B's tailed beast. It is a cross between an ox and an octopus with the tentacles making up the tails. He can transform into the beast at will.
- In Kamen Rider Decade, Hibiki's desire to destroy all Makamou caused his oni power to consume him and turn him into the ox Makamou Gyuki. When Asumu becomes the new Kamen Rider Hibiki, he puts the original Hibiki out of his misery by destroying him with his Mouka Dotou form.
- In Gegege no Kitaro, an ushi-oni steals Kitaro (GeGeGe no Kitaro)'s soul and forces him to do its bidding.
- In Touhou Project, Urumi Ushizaki is an ushi-oni.
- In Fate/Grand Order, Minamoto Raikou is an ushi-oni called Ushi-Gozen.
- In Arknights, Matoimaru is an ushi-oni, originally having been named Gyuki in the game's beta.
- The Digimon franchise has a monster called 'Gyukimon', whose design is based heavily on the Gyūki.
- The Warriors Orochi series has an officer named Gyuki who is a member of Orochi's forces. He is a playable character in 3 and 4.
- In The Grim Adventures of Billy and Mandy's, "Wrath of The Spider Queen", Arachnotaur, a spider god imprisoned in a chocolate milk carton and was later set free, draws parallels to the ushi-oni as well as the Minotaur of Greek mythology.

== See also ==
- Gozu
- Minotaur
