= List of cities in Ehime Prefecture by population =

The following list sorts all cities (including towns) in the Japanese prefecture of Ehime with a population of more than 5,000 according to the 2020 Census. As of October 1, 2020, 19 places fulfill this criterion and are listed here. This list refers only to the population of individual cities, towns and villages within their defined limits, which does not include other municipalities or suburban areas within urban agglomerations.

== List ==
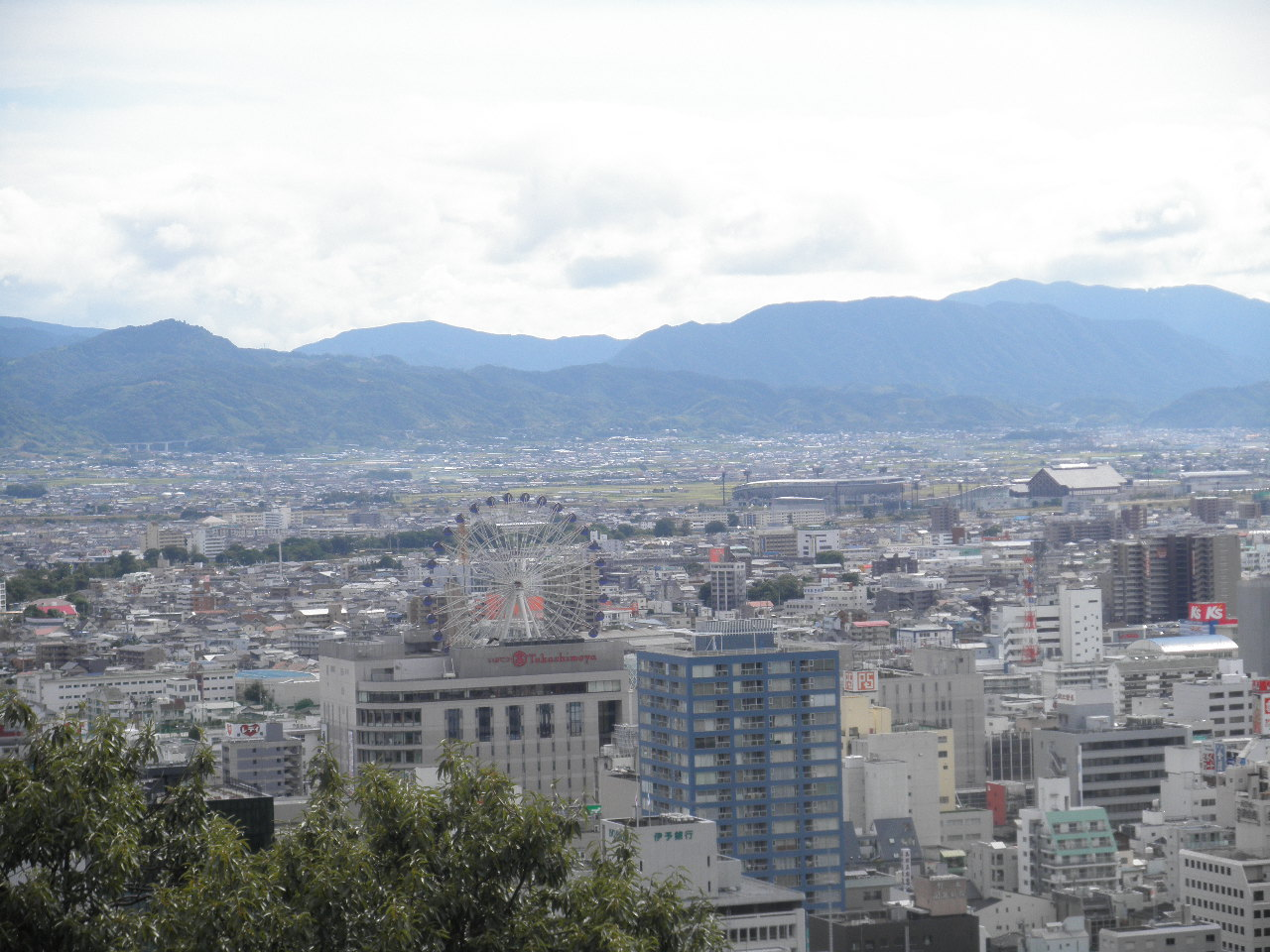
Matsuyama

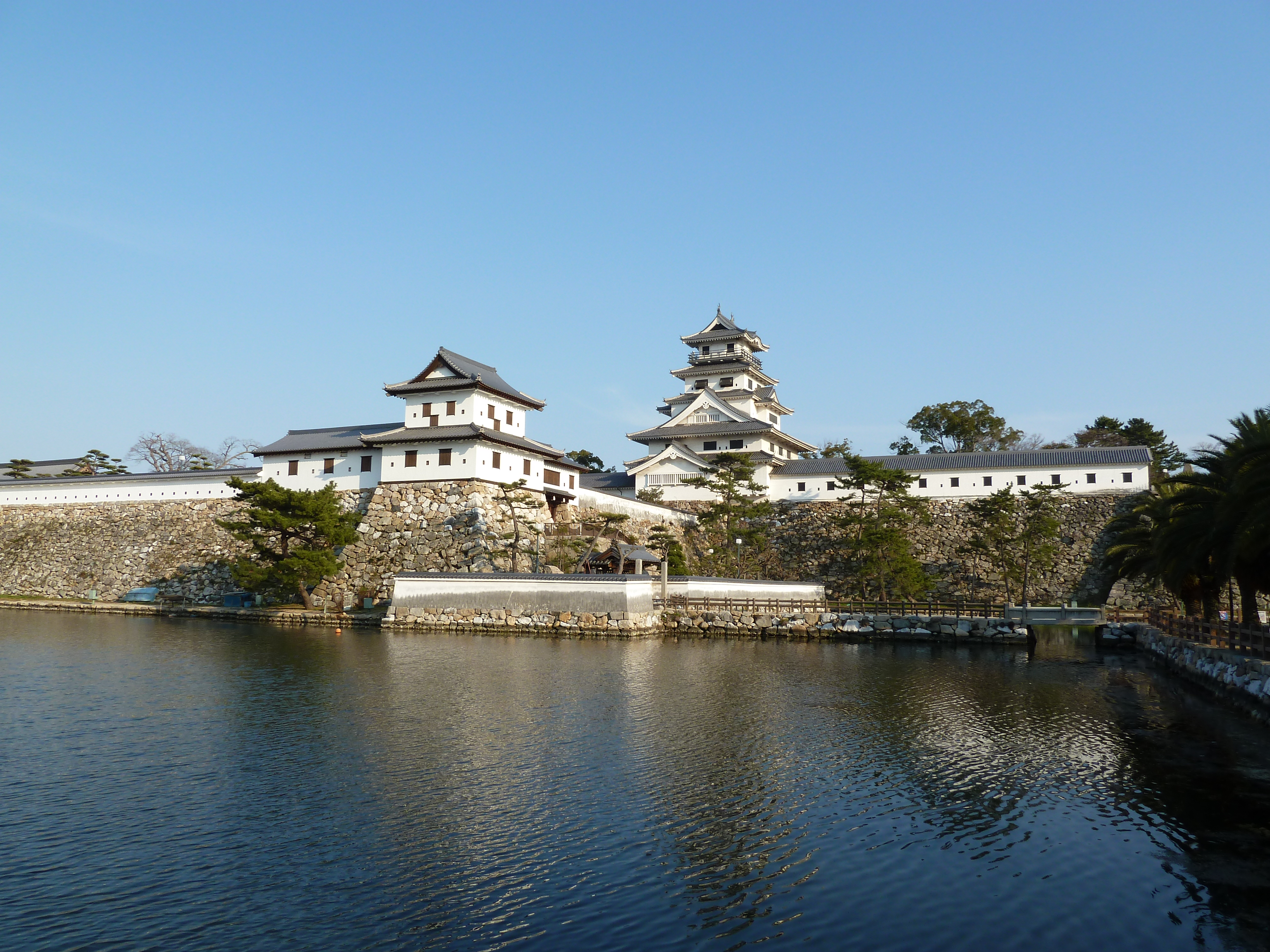
Imabari

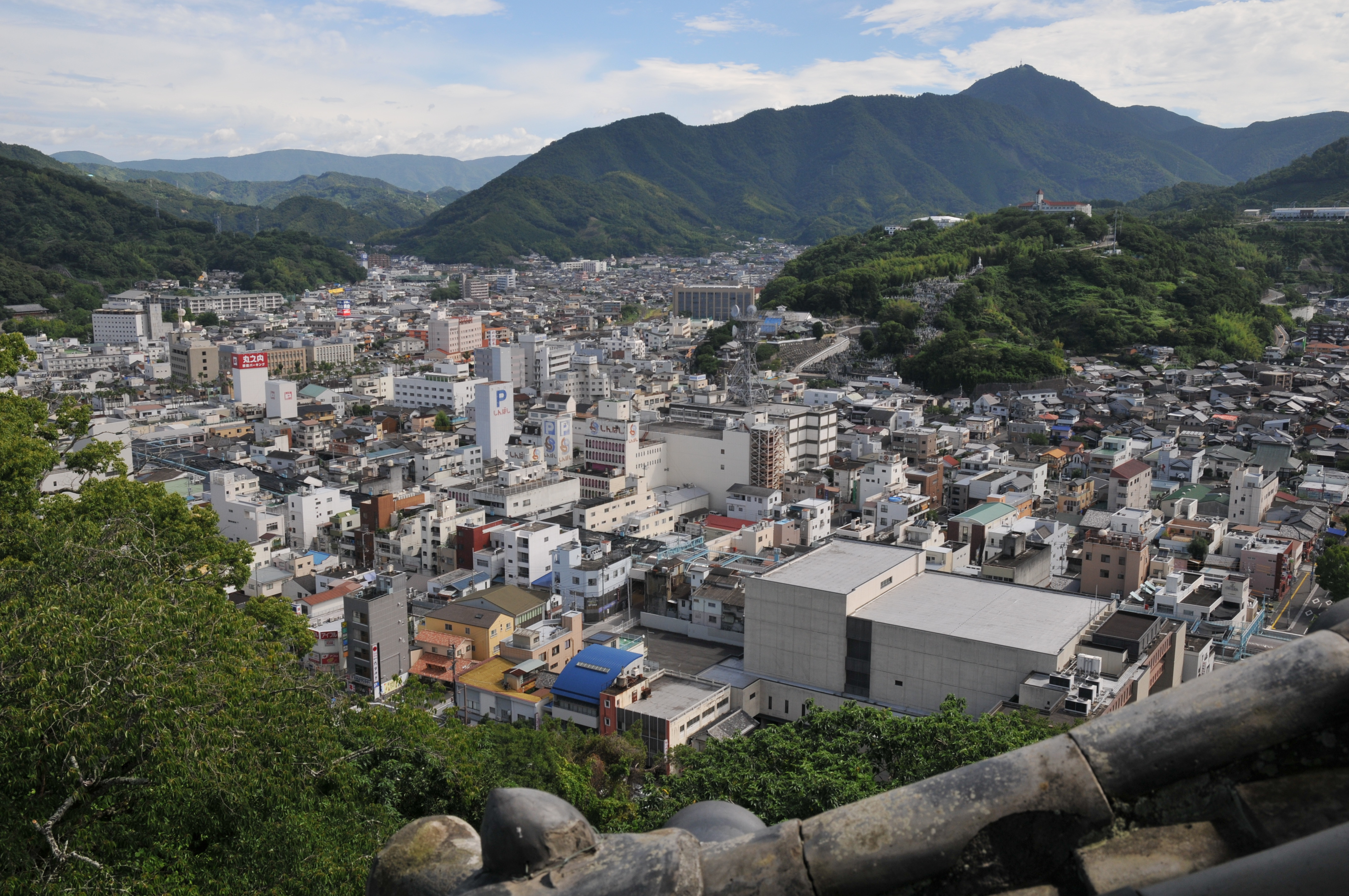
Uwajima

The following table lists the 19 cities and towns in Ehime with a population of at least 5,000 on October 1, 2020, according to the 2020 Census. The table also gives an overview of the evolution of the population since the 1995 census.

Rank (2020)	Name	Status	2020	2015	2010	2005	2000	1995
1	Matsuyama	City	511,569	514,865	517,231	514,937	508,266	497,203
2	Imabari	City	151,756	158,114	166,532	173,983	180,627	185,435
3	Niihama	City	116,005	119,903	121,735	123,952	125,814	128,236
4	Saijō	City	104,879	108,174	112,091	113,371	114,548	114,706
5	Shikokuchūō	City	82,849	87,413	90,187	92,854	94,326	95,658
6	Uwajima	City	70,820	77,465	84,210	89,444	95,641	100,776
7	Ōzu	City	40,566	44,086	47,157	50,786	52,762	53,850
8	Seiyo	City	35,411	38,919	42,080	44,948	47,217	49,022
9	Iyo	City	35,161	36,827	38,017	39,493	40,505	41,064
10	Tōon	City	33,917	34,613	35,253	35,278	34,701	33,058
11	Yawatahama	City	31,995	34,951	38,370	41,264	44,206	47,410
12	Masaki	Town	29,646	30,064	30,359	30,564	30,277	30,106
13	Tobe	Town	20,491	21,239	21,981	22,424	22,075	21,705
14	Ainan	Town	19,606	21,902	24,061	26,636	29,331	31,101
15	Uchiko	Town	15,333	16,742	18,045	19,620	20,782	21,678
16	Kihoku	Town	9,685	10,705	11,633	12,432	13,080	13,706
17	Ikata	Town	8,401	9,626	10,882	12,095	13,536	14,787
18	Kumakogen	Town	7,413	8,447	9,644	10,946	11,887	12,781
19	Kamijima	Town	6,510	7,135	7,648	8,098	8,605	9,380
