= Uwa District, Iyo =

Former district in modern-day Ehime Prefecture

Uwa (宇和郡, Uwa-gun) was a district in Iyo Province (modern-day Ehime Prefecture), Japan.

== History ==
- 866 - Uwa District divided into Uwa and Kita Districts.
- On February 25, 1876, Okinoshima, Himejima, and Ugurujima Islands were sent to Hata District in Tosa Province
- On December 16, 1878, The district was divided to create the Nishiuwa, Higashiuwa, Kitauwa, and Minamiuwa Districts. The Uwa District was thus dissolved.
  - Nishiuwa District – Active (The area once included the city of Yawatahama and parts of the cities of Seiyo and Ōzu)
  - Higashiuwa District – Dissolved on April 1, 2004 (The area once included the cities of Seiyo, Uwajima and Ōzu)
  - Kitauwa District – Active (The area once included the city of Uwajima (excluding some parts of the city))
  - Minamiuwa District – Active
