= Museum of Ehime History and Culture =

Museum in Seiyo, Ehime, Japan

Coordinates: 33°21′50.2″N 132°31′5.2″E

- 愛媛県歴史文化博物館
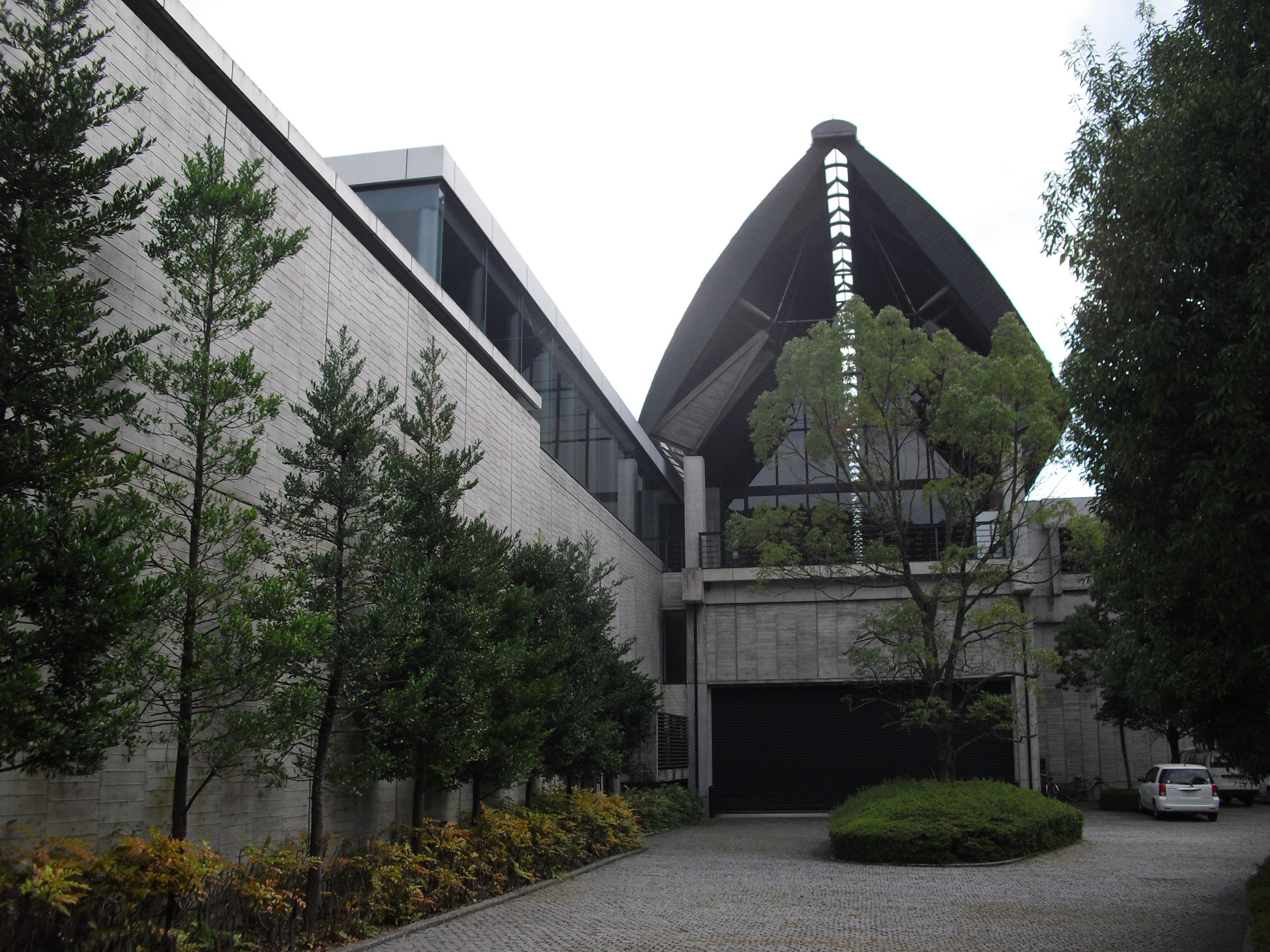
- Established: November 1994
- Location: Seiyo, Ehime, Japan
- Type: History
- Website: https://www.i-rekihaku.jp

Museum of Ehime History and Culture (愛媛県歴史文化博物館, Ehime-ken Rekishi Bunka Hakubutsukan) is a history museum located in Seiyo, Ehime, Japan. The museum introduces mainly the history and folklore of Ehime prefecture in general, and the southern region of it in specific.

== History ==
The museum was opened to the public in November 1994. At the time it was located in Uwa town, which was merged with neighbor towns and districts to form the new city of Seiyo.

== Facilities ==
The museum includes four historical exhibitions, a folklore exhibition, experience study room, a library, and a hall where seminars about cultural history are held.

== Access ==
The museum is located approximately 20 minutes walk from Unomachi Station on the Yosan Line.

== See also ==
- Kaimei School
