= Kaimei School =

School in Ehime Prefecture, Japan

Coordinates: 33°21′51.3″N 132°30′49″E

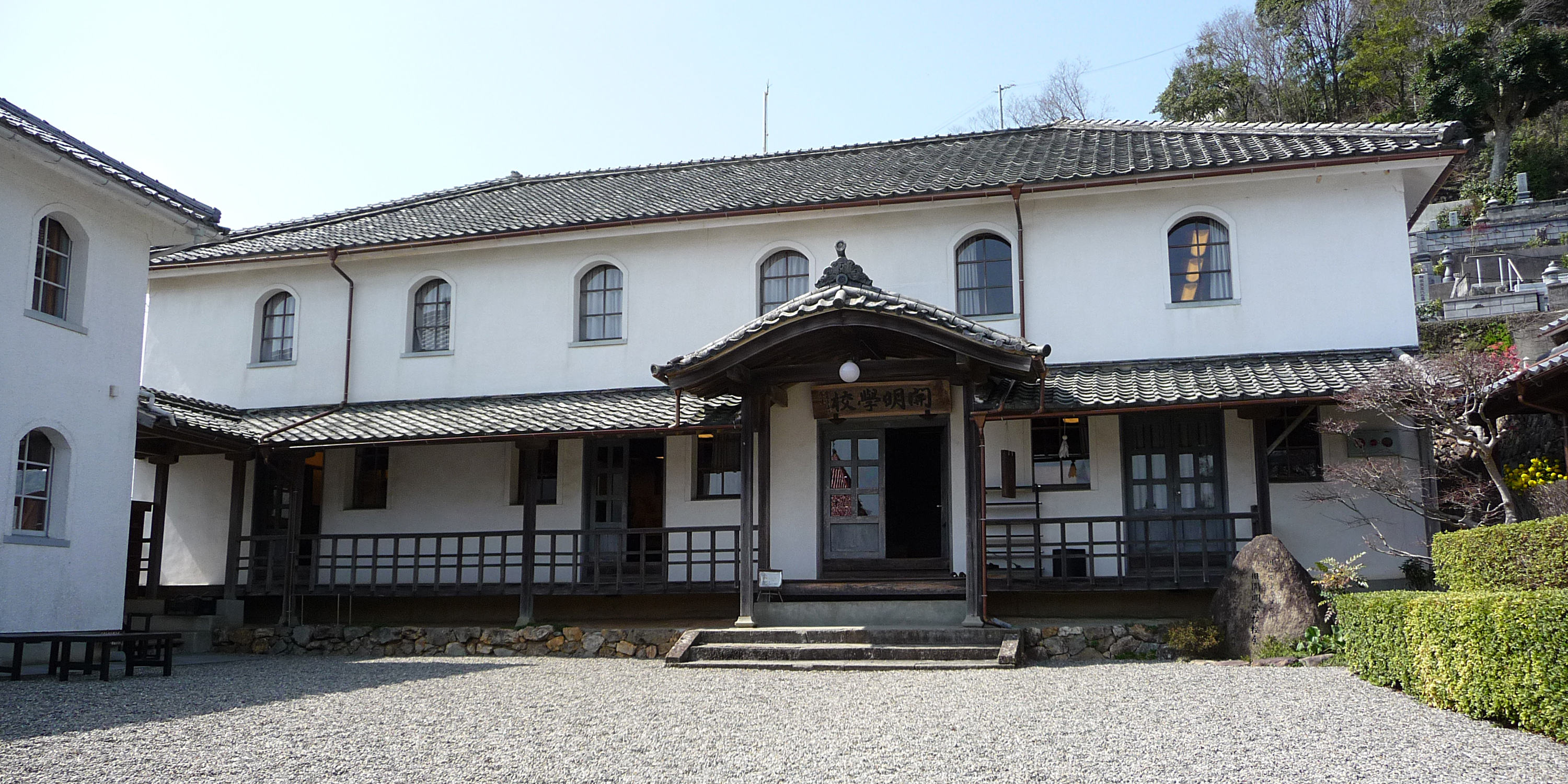
Kaimei Primary school

Kaimei School (開明学校, Kaimei gakkō) is a school located in Seiyo, Ehime, Ehime, Japan, which was built in 1882, and is considered to be the oldest school in Shikoku. With its rare Giyōfū architectural style on kaimei school was designated as one of the important cultural properties of Japan in May 1997. Today the school is a museum where 6,000 precious documents are stored and displayed including school textbooks in the Edo period through the early Shōwa period and documents on school administration.

== See also ==
- Uwa, Ehime
- Museum of Ehime History and Culture
