= Hijikawa, Ehime =

Dissolved municipality in Ehime prefecture, Japan

Hijikawa (肱川町, Hijikawa-chō) was a town located in Kita District, Ehime Prefecture, Japan.

As of 2003, the town had an estimated population of 3,114 and a density of 49.05 persons per km^{2}. The total area was 63.30 km^{2}.

On January 11, 2005, Hijikawa, along with the town of Nagahama, and the village of Kawabe (all from Kita District), was merged into the expanded city of Ōzu and no longer exists as an independent municipality.
