= Higashiuwa District, Ehime =

Former district in Ehime prefecture, Japan

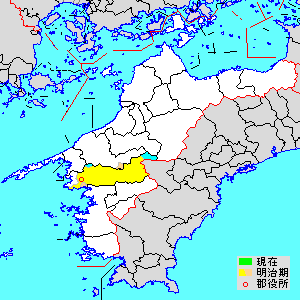

Higashiuwa (東宇和郡, Higashiuwa-gun) was a district located in Ehime Prefecture, Japan.

== History ==
- 1878 — Uwa District was split up by Meiji era land reforms. Higashiuwa District was thus born. (1 town, 21 villages)
- January 1, 1914 — Parts of the village of Tanisuji was merged into the village of No.
- January 1, 1922 — The village of No was elevated to town status to become the town of Nomura. (2 towns, 20 villages)
- February 11, 1922 — The village of Kamiuwa was merged into the town of Uwa. (2 towns, 19 villages)
- December 1, 1929 — The villages of Kasagi and Yamada were merged to create the village of Iwaki. (2 towns, 18 villages)
- April 1, 1943, parts of the village of Ukena (from Kamiukena District) was merged into the village of Sōkawa.
- March 31, 1954 — The villages of Yusukawa, Doi, Takagawa and Uonashi were merged to create the village of Kurosegawa. (2 towns, 15 villages)
- March 31, 1954 — The villages of Tada, Nakagawa, Iwaki, Shimouwa and Tanosuji were merged into the town of Uwa. (2 towns, 10 villages)
- February 11, 1955 — The villages of Nakasuji, Tanisuji, Sōkawa, and parts of Kaibuki and Yokobayashi were merged into the town of Nomura. (2 towns, 7 villages)
- February 11, 1955 — Parts of the villages of Kaibuki and Yokobayashi merged into the village of Hijikawa in Kita District (now the city of Ōzu). (2 towns, 5 villages)
- March 31, 1955 — The villages of Tawarazu and Karie were merged to create the village of Toyoumi. (2 towns, 4 villages)
- March 31, 1955 — The village of Tamatsu was merged into the town of Yoshida (from Kitauwa District) (now the city of Uwajima). (2 towns, 3 villages)
- January 1, 1958 — The villages of Toyoumi and Takayama were merged to create the town of Akehama. (3 towns, 1 village)
- August 1, 1958 — parts of the city of Ōzu was merged into the town of Uwa.
- April 1, 1959 — The village of Kurosegawa was renamed and elevated to town status to become the town of Shirokawa. (4 towns)
- April 1, 2004 — The towns of Akehama, Nomura, Shirokawa and Uwa, along with the town of Mikame (from Nishiuwa District) were to create the city of Seiyo. Therefore, Higashiuwa District was dissolved as a result of this merger.

== See also ==
- List of dissolved districts of Japan
