= Shirokawa, Ehime =

Dissolved municipality in Ehime prefecture, Japan

Shirokawa (城川町, Shirokawa-chō) was a town located in Higashiuwa District, Ehime Prefecture, Japan.

As of 2003, the town had an estimated population of 4,583 and a density of 36.00 persons per km^{2}. The total area was 127.31 km^{2}.

On April 1, 2004, Shirokawa, along with the towns of Akehama, Nomura and Uwa (all from Higashiuwa District), and the town of Mikame (from Nishiuwa District), was merged to create the city of Seiyo.
