= Honai, Ehime =

Town in Ehime Prefecture, Japan

Honai (保内町, Honai-chō) was a town located in Nishiuwa District, Ehime Prefecture, Japan.

As of 2003, the town had an estimated population of 10,686 and a density of 288.73 persons per km^{2}. The total area was 37.01 km^{2}.

On March 28, 2005, Honai was merged into the expanded city of Yawatahama.
