= Hiyoshi, Ehime =

Dissolved municipality in Ehime prefecture, Japan

Hiyoshi (日吉村, Hiyoshi-mura) was a village located in Kitauwa District, Ehime Prefecture, Japan.

As of 2000, the village had an estimated population of 1,933 and a density of 21.75 persons per km^{2}. The total area was 88.89 km^{2}.

On January 1, 2005, Hiroshi, along with the town of Hiromi (also from Kitauwa District), was merged to create the new town of Kihoku.
