= Hiromi, Ehime =

Dissolved municipality in Ehime prefecture, Japan

Hiromi (広見町, Hiromi-chō) was a town located in Kitauwa District, Ehime Prefecture, Japan.

As of 2000, the town had an estimated population of 11,147 and a density of 72.87 persons per km^{2}. The total area was 152.98 km^{2}.

On January 1, 2005, Hiromi, along with the village of Hiyoshi (also from Kitauwa District), was merged to create the new town of Kihoku.
