= Oda, Ehime =

Dissolved municipality in Ehime prefecture, Japan

Oda (小田町, Oda-chō) was a town located in Kamiukena District, Ehime Prefecture, Japan.

As of 2003, the town had an estimated population of 3,555 and a density of 25.42 persons per km^{2}. The total area was 139.84 km^{2}.

On January 1, 2005, Oda, along with the town of Ikazaki (from Kita District), was merged into the expanded town of Uchiko and no longer exists as an independent municipality.
