= Ikazaki, Ehime =

Dissolved municipality in Kita district of Japan

Coordinates: 33.532°N 132.645°E

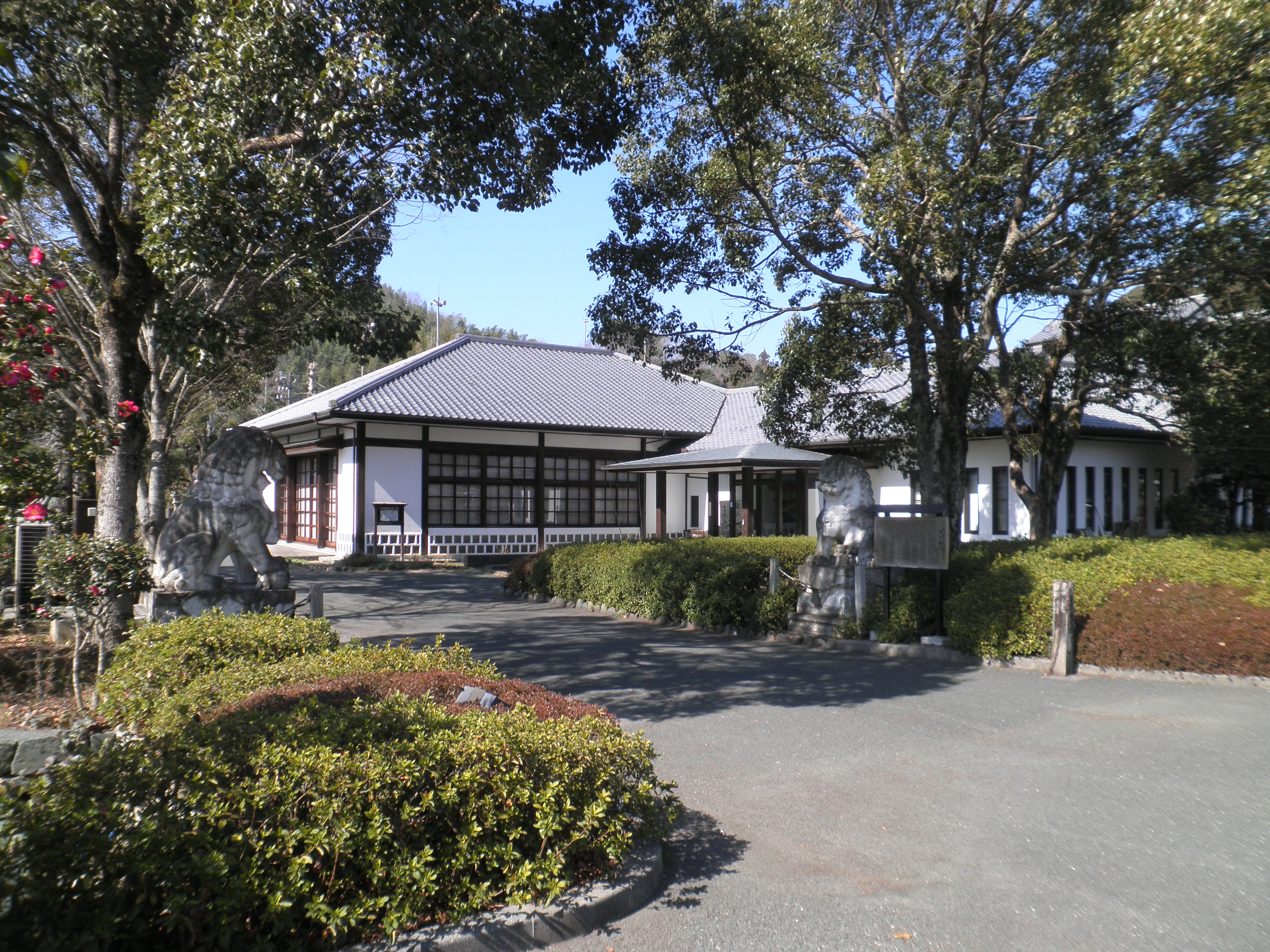
Ikazaki Kite Museum

Ikazaki (五十崎町, Ikazaki-chō) was a town located in Kita District, Ehime Prefecture, Japan.

As of 2003, the town had an estimated population of 5,746 and a density of 149.29 persons per km^{2}. The total area was 38.49 km^{2}.

On January 1, 2005, Ikazaki, along with the town of Oda (from Kamiukena District), was merged into the expanded town of Uchiko and no longer exists as an independent municipality.

Ikazaki has an annual kite fighting competition on May 5. Bladed metal instruments called 'gagari' are attached to kite strings and used to cut down other kites.
