= Nomura, Ehime =

Dissolved municipality in Ehime prefecture, Japan

Nomura (野村町, Nomura-chō) is a town located in Higashiuwa District, Ehime Prefecture, Japan.

As of July 31, 2003, the town had a population of 10,916 and a density of 56.22 persons per km^{2}. The total area was 187.60 km^{2}.

On April 1, 2004, Nomura, along with the towns of Akehama, Shirokawa and Uwa (all from Higashiuwa District), and the town of Mikame (from Nishiuwa District), was merged to create the city of Seiyo.

Its main industry is stock breeding. Nomura is also known for sumo wrestling, silk production and dairy farming. Every year, the annual Otoi Sumo Tournament is held at the Otoi Sumo hall. This is the only tournament in Japan where amateurs and professionals compete against each other.
