= Nagahama, Ehime =

Dissolved municipality in Ehime prefecture, Japan

Nagahama (長浜町, Nagahama-chō) was a town located in Kita District, Ehime Prefecture, Japan.

In 2003, the town had an estimated population of 8,765 and a density of 117.19 persons per km^{2}. The total area was 74.79 km^{2}.

On January 11, 2005, Nagahama, along with the town of Hijikawa and the village of Kawabe (all from Kita District), was merged into the expanded city of Ōzu and no longer exists as an independent municipality.

Located on the coast, some of Nagahama's industries include fishing, logging, and a traditional wooden sandal factory. It is renowned in its area for its fugu (blowfish) sushi.

There is an observatory in Nagahama from which a view of the Hijikawa River feeding into the Seto Inland Sea can be seen. There is a famous old drawbridge that is the oldest of its kind in Japan still in use. Iyo-Nagahama Station serves Nagahama and has been featured in several movies.

Nagahama is also known as Iyo-Nagahama and is not to be confused with Nagahama City in Shiga Prefecture.

== Climate ==
Climate data for Nagahama (1991−2020 normals, extremes 1978−present)
Month	Jan	Feb	Mar	Apr	May	Jun	Jul	Aug	Sep	Oct	Nov	Dec	Year
Record high °C (°F)	19.9 (67.8)	22.4 (72.3)	25.7 (78.3)	28.0 (82.4)	30.6 (87.1)	35.5 (95.9)	35.5 (95.9)	35.9 (96.6)	35.0 (95.0)	31.3 (88.3)	26.4 (79.5)	24.1 (75.4)	35.9 (96.6)
Mean daily maximum °C (°F)	9.8 (49.6)	10.2 (50.4)	13.1 (55.6)	17.6 (63.7)	21.7 (71.1)	24.5 (76.1)	28.9 (84.0)	29.9 (85.8)	26.7 (80.1)	22.3 (72.1)	17.4 (63.3)	12.4 (54.3)	19.5 (67.2)
Daily mean °C (°F)	6.5 (43.7)	6.8 (44.2)	9.4 (48.9)	13.6 (56.5)	17.7 (63.9)	21.2 (70.2)	25.4 (77.7)	26.5 (79.7)	23.5 (74.3)	18.6 (65.5)	13.5 (56.3)	8.7 (47.7)	15.9 (60.7)
Mean daily minimum °C (°F)	3.1 (37.6)	3.3 (37.9)	5.6 (42.1)	9.7 (49.5)	14.1 (57.4)	18.5 (65.3)	22.7 (72.9)	23.7 (74.7)	20.6 (69.1)	14.9 (58.8)	9.6 (49.3)	5.2 (41.4)	12.6 (54.7)
Record low °C (°F)	−2.6 (27.3)	−4.2 (24.4)	−2.5 (27.5)	0.9 (33.6)	5.0 (41.0)	10.0 (50.0)	14.9 (58.8)	17.5 (63.5)	11.3 (52.3)	4.1 (39.4)	1.6 (34.9)	−2.1 (28.2)	−4.2 (24.4)
Average precipitation mm (inches)	44.5 (1.75)	59.2 (2.33)	94.7 (3.73)	107.1 (4.22)	132.4 (5.21)	243.7 (9.59)	207.8 (8.18)	106.4 (4.19)	147.0 (5.79)	97.6 (3.84)	71.1 (2.80)	59.9 (2.36)	1,371.2 (53.98)
Average precipitation days (≥ 1.0 mm)	7.0	7.7	9.8	9.5	9.0	12.2	10.0	7.5	9.0	7.5	7.7	8.6	105.5
Mean monthly sunshine hours	104.9	129.0	169.7	196.1	217.5	161.9	207.1	231.5	171.0	168.1	127.0	98.8	1,982.7
Source: Japan Meteorological Agency
