= Nishiuwa District, Ehime =

District in Ehime prefecture, Japan

Coordinates: 33°26′06″N 132°12′04″E

Nishiuwa (西宇和郡, Nishiuwa-gun) is a district located in Ehime Prefecture, Japan.

As of 2007, the district has an estimated population of 12,304 with a total area of 94.34 km^{2}.

The district consists of one town., Ikata.

== History ==
- In accordance with 1878 Land Reforms, the district was founded after breaking off from the Uwa District. (1 town, 22 villages)
- February 1898 — The village of Hirano was reassigned to the Kita District (now the city of Ōzu). (1 town, 21 villages)
- August 1, 1914 — The village of Kawanoishi gained town status. (2 towns, 20 villages)
- September 3, 1921 — The village of Mikame gained town status. (3 towns, 19 villages)
- July 1, 1928 — The village of Kamiyama gained town status. (4 towns, 18 villages)
- January 1, 1930 — The village of Yanozaki merged into the town of Yawatahama. (4 towns, 17 villages)
- February 11, 1935 — The villages of Senjō, Shitada, and the town of Kamiyama merged into city of Yawatahama. (2 towns, 15 villages)
- January 1, 1955 — The villages of Nikifu, Mishima, Izumi and parts of Fukigawa in the village of Futaiwa merged into the town of Mikame. (2 towns, 13 villages)
- February 1, 1955 — The villages of Futaiwa (excluding parts), Hizuchi, Maana and Kawakami merged into the city of Yawatahama. (2 towns, 9 villages)
- March 31, 1955
  - The villages of Isotsu, Miyauchi, Kawanoishi, and Kisuki merged to become the town of Honai. (2 towns, 6 villages)
  - The villages of Ikata and Machimi merged to become the town of Ikata. (3 towns, 4 villages)
  - The villages of Kanmatsu and Misaki merged to become the town of Misaki. (4 towns, 2 villages)
- June 1, 1956 — The villages of Mitsukue and Yotsuhama merged to become the town of Seto. (5 towns)
- April 1, 2004 — The town of Mikame merged with the towns of Uwa, Nomura, Akehama, and Shirokawa from Higashiuwa District to form the city of Seiyo. (4 towns)
- March 28, 2005 — The town of Honai merged into the city of Yawatahama. (3 towns)
- April 1, 2005 — The towns of Seto, and Misaki merged into the town of Ikata. (1 town)
