= Uwa, Ehime =

Dissolved municipality in Ehime prefecture, Japan

Uwa (宇和町, Uwa-chō) was a town located in Higashiuwa District, Ehime Prefecture, Japan.

As of 2003, the town had an estimated population of 17,692 and a density of 133.49 persons per km^{2}. The total area was 132.53 km^{2}.

On April 1, 2004, Uwa was merged with the towns of Akehama, Nomura and Shirokawa (all from Higashiuwa District), and the town of Mikame (from Nishiuwa District), to create the city of Seiyo.

== Climate ==
Climate data for Uwa, Ehime (1991−2020 normals, extremes 1978−present)
Month	Jan	Feb	Mar	Apr	May	Jun	Jul	Aug	Sep	Oct	Nov	Dec	Year
Record high °C (°F)	20.1 (68.2)	22.6 (72.7)	25.5 (77.9)	29.0 (84.2)	33.2 (91.8)	34.9 (94.8)	36.6 (97.9)	38.2 (100.8)	35.5 (95.9)	32.5 (90.5)	26.7 (80.1)	22.3 (72.1)	38.2 (100.8)
Mean daily maximum °C (°F)	8.8 (47.8)	10.2 (50.4)	14.0 (57.2)	19.4 (66.9)	24.1 (75.4)	26.7 (80.1)	30.7 (87.3)	32.0 (89.6)	28.4 (83.1)	22.9 (73.2)	17.1 (62.8)	11.3 (52.3)	20.5 (68.8)
Daily mean °C (°F)	4.3 (39.7)	5.2 (41.4)	8.5 (47.3)	13.5 (56.3)	18.2 (64.8)	21.8 (71.2)	25.8 (78.4)	26.6 (79.9)	23.0 (73.4)	17.2 (63.0)	11.6 (52.9)	6.3 (43.3)	15.2 (59.3)
Mean daily minimum °C (°F)	0.1 (32.2)	0.5 (32.9)	3.1 (37.6)	7.6 (45.7)	12.8 (55.0)	17.9 (64.2)	22.1 (71.8)	22.6 (72.7)	18.9 (66.0)	12.5 (54.5)	6.8 (44.2)	2.0 (35.6)	10.6 (51.0)
Record low °C (°F)	−9.1 (15.6)	−12.0 (10.4)	−5.9 (21.4)	−2.2 (28.0)	1.9 (35.4)	7.6 (45.7)	12.4 (54.3)	14.8 (58.6)	7.4 (45.3)	1.0 (33.8)	−2.0 (28.4)	−8.2 (17.2)	−12.0 (10.4)
Average precipitation mm (inches)	76.1 (3.00)	94.8 (3.73)	139.1 (5.48)	152.1 (5.99)	189.0 (7.44)	311.0 (12.24)	282.7 (11.13)	140.3 (5.52)	197.8 (7.79)	125.0 (4.92)	101.5 (4.00)	91.0 (3.58)	1,927.5 (75.89)
Average precipitation days (≥ 1.0 mm)	10.4	10.1	11.6	10.2	9.4	13.6	10.8	8.9	10.3	8.3	8.8	11.0	123.4
Mean monthly sunshine hours	107.9	126.5	162.5	186.7	200.1	136.2	188.2	215.3	159.1	166.3	130.4	104.7	1,873.8
Source: Japan Meteorological Agency

== See also ==
- Kaimei School
