= Mikame, Ehime =

Dissolved municipality in Ehime prefecture, Japan

Mikame (三瓶町, Mikame-chō) was a town located in Nishiuwa District, Ehime Prefecture, Japan.

In 2003, the town had an estimated population of 8,660 and a density of 209.38 persons per km^{2}. The total area was 41.36 km^{2}.

On April 1, 2004, Mikame, along with the towns of Akehama, Nomura, Shirokawa and Uwa (all from Higashiuwa District), was merged to create the city of Seiyo.
