= Kawabe, Ehime =

Dissolved municipality in Ehime prefecture, Japan

Kawabe (河辺村, Kawabe-mura) was a village located in Kita District, Ehime Prefecture, Japan.

As of 2003, the village had an estimated population of 1,220 and a density of 22.97 persons per km^{2}. The total area was 53.12 km^{2}.

On January 11, 2005, Kawabe, along with the towns of Hijikawa and Nagahama (all from Kita District), was merged into the expanded city of Ōzu and no longer exists as an independent municipality.
