= Akehama, Ehime =

Dissolved municipality in Ehime prefecture, Japan

Akehama (明浜町, Akehama-chō) was a town located in Higashiuwa District, Ehime Prefecture, Japan.

As of 2003, the town had an estimated population of 4,458 and a density of 171.59 persons per km^{2}. The total area was 25.98 km^{2}.

On April 1, 2004, Akehama, along with the towns of Nomura, Shirokawa and Uwa (all from Higashiuwa District), and the town of Mikame (from Nishiuwa District), was merged to create the city of Seiyo.
