= Yawatahama =

City in Ehime Prefecture, Japan

Yawatahama 八幡浜市
- City
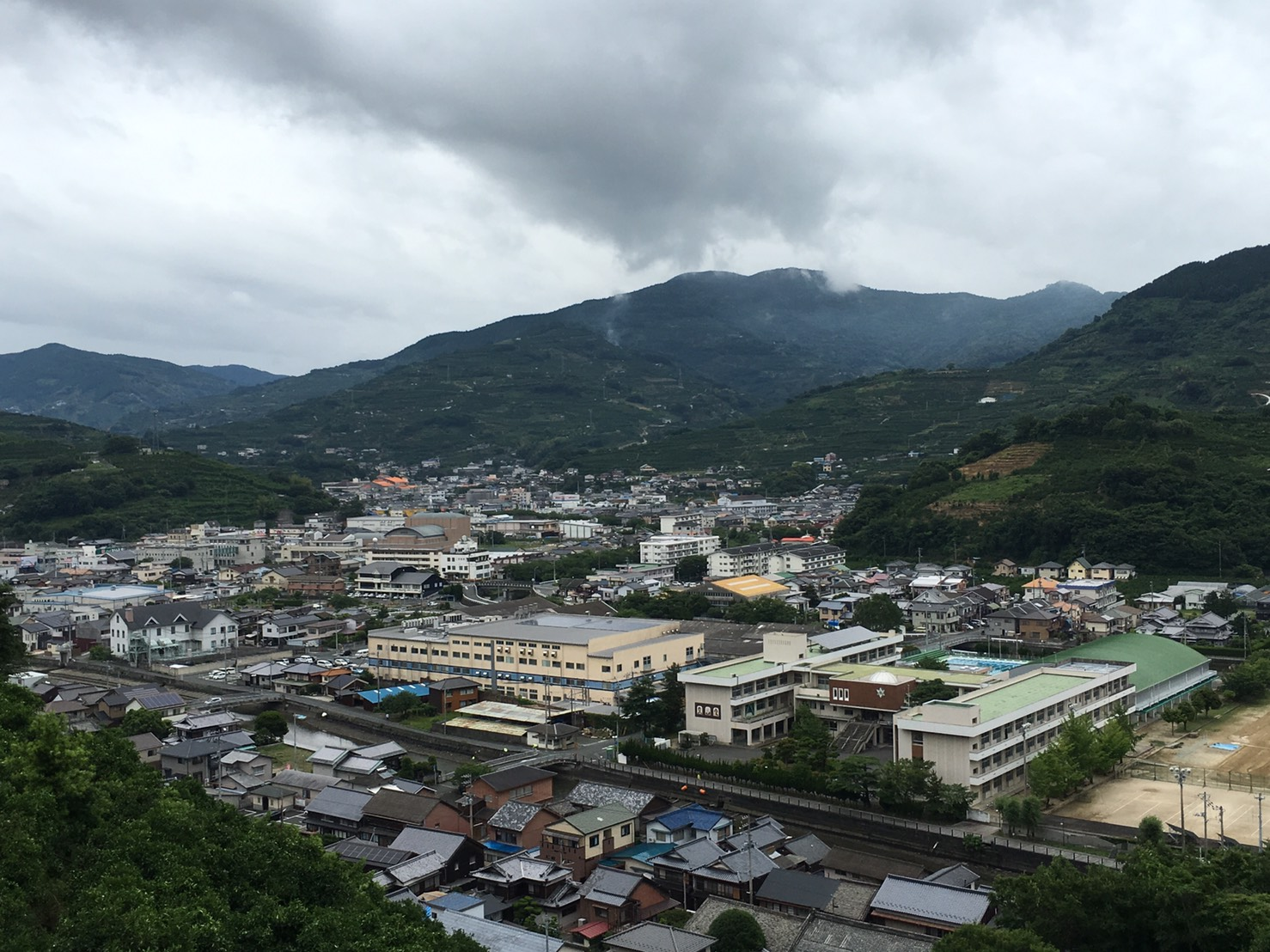
- Panoramic view of Yawatahama from Kotohira shrine

- Flag Seal
- Location of Yawatahama in Ehime Prefecture

- Location in Japan
- Coordinates: 33°28′N 132°25′E
- Country: Japan
- Region: Shikoku
- Prefecture: Ehime

Government
  - Mayor: Ichiro Oshiro (since April 2009)

Area
  - Total: 132.68 km^{2} (51.23 sq mi)

Population (August 31, 2022)
  - Total: 31,385
  - Density: 236.55/km^{2} (612.65/sq mi)
- Time zone: UTC+09:00 (JST)
- City hall address: 1-1-1 Kitahama, Yawatahama-shi, Ehime-ken 796-8501
- Website: Official website
- Symbols
- Flower: Narcissus (水仙, Suisen)
- Tree: Mikan (温州蜜柑, Unshū mikan)

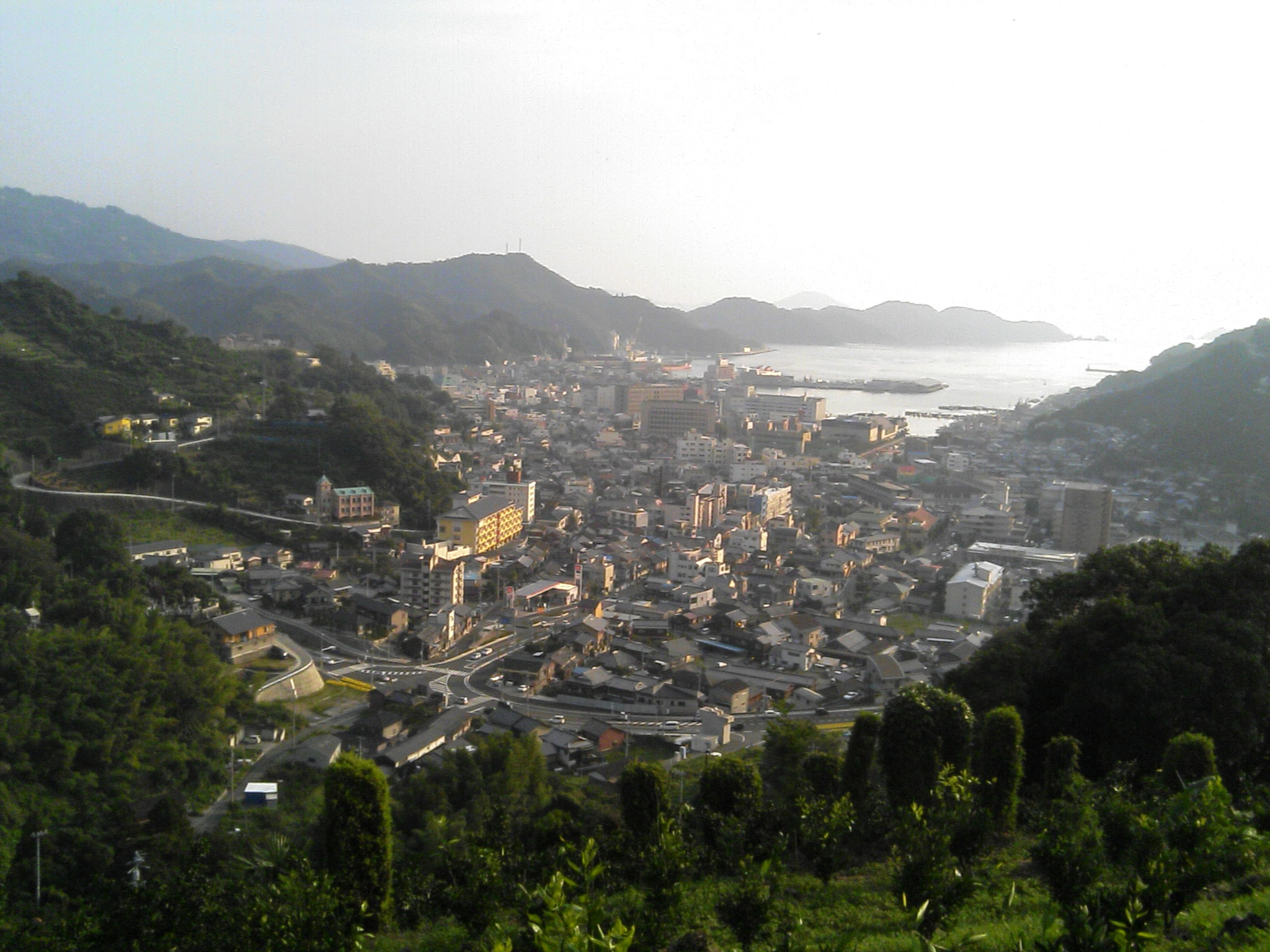
Yawatahama seen from a nearby mountain

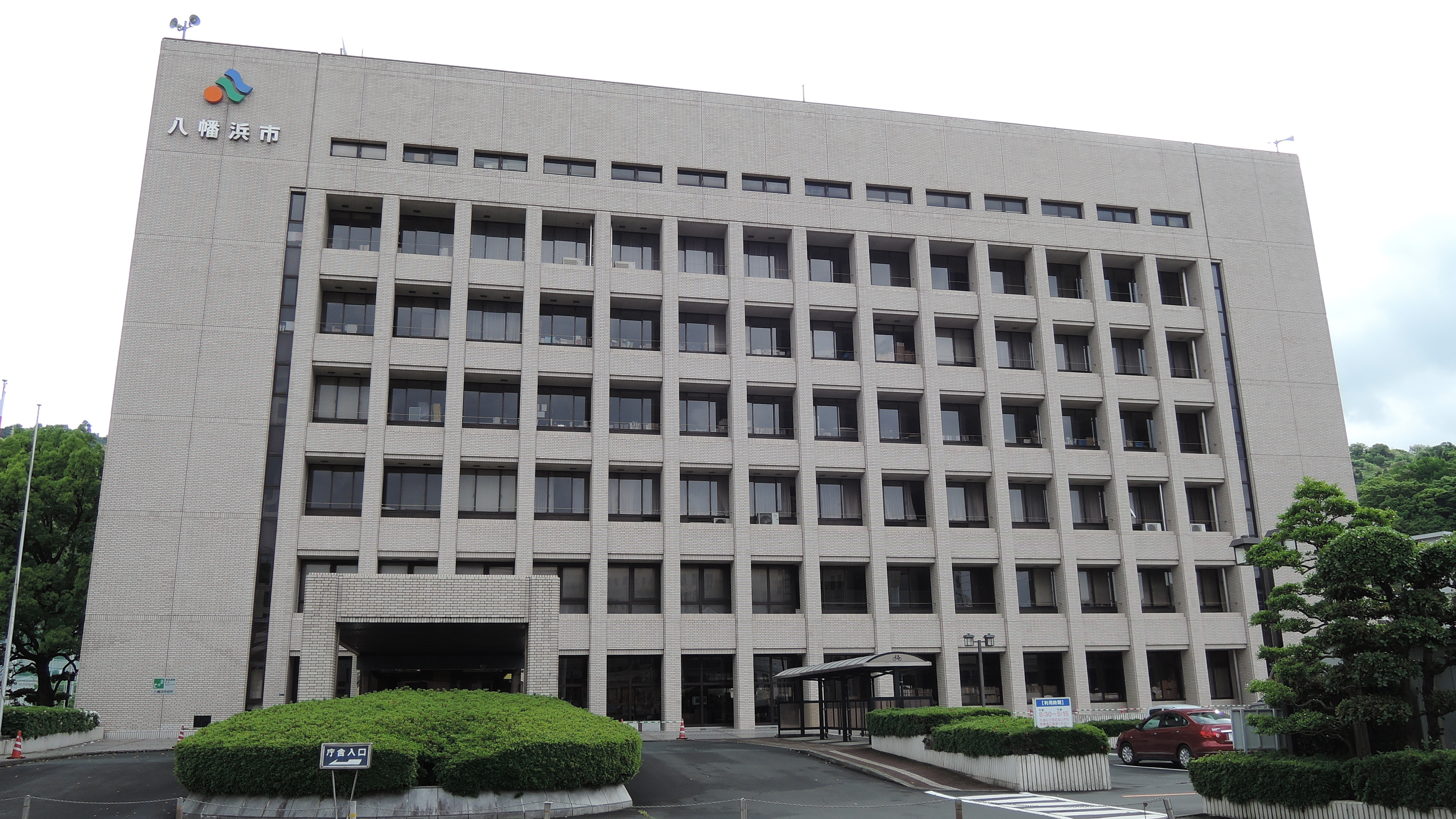
Yawatahama City Hall

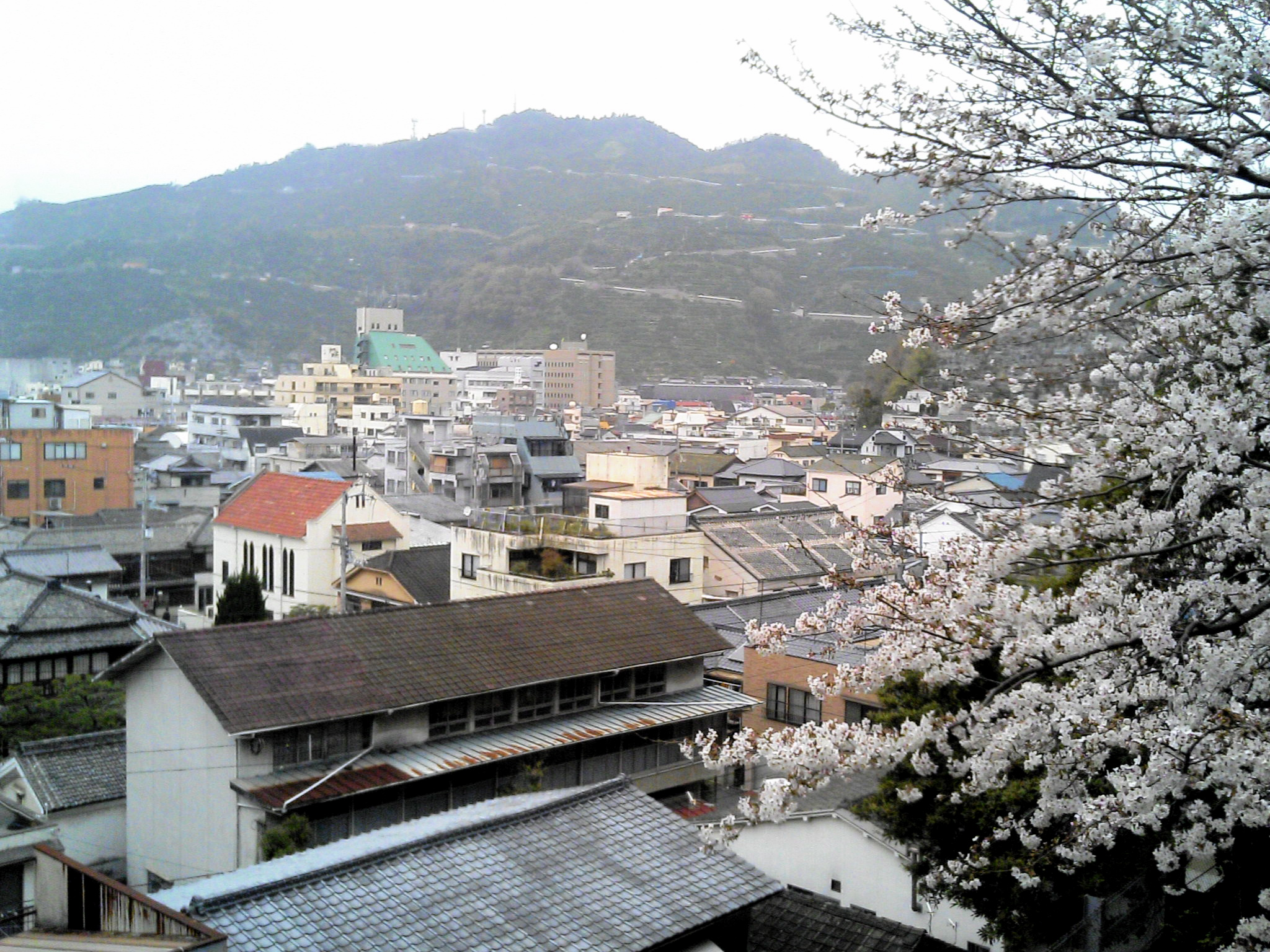
Looking out over a residential area near downtown Yawatahama

Yawatahama (八幡浜市, Yawatahama-shi) is a city located in of Ehime Prefecture, Japan. As of 31 August 2022, the city had an estimated population of 31,385 in 15,638 households and a population density of 240 persons per km^{2}. The total area of the city is 132.68 square kilometres (51.23 sq mi).

== Geography ==
Yawatahama is located in the western part of Ehime Prefecture on the island of Shikoku, at the base of the Sadamisaki Peninsula. It faces the Seto Inland Sea to the north, and faces Kyushu to the west across the Bungo Channel. The coastline is a ria coastline, with steep slopes, creating a scenic landscape where capes and coves intersect. For a long time, the city's naturally good harbor has served as an important one for Ehime Prefecture and Shikoku. Flat land is exceedingly sparse and the hilly terrain has been used for citrus production.

=== Neighbouring municipalities ===
Ehime Prefecture

- Ikata
- Ōzu
- Seiyo

=== Climate ===
Yawatahama has a humid subtropical climate (Köppen Cfa) characterized by warm summers and cool winters with light snowfall. The average annual temperature in Yawatahama is 15.5 °C. The average annual rainfall is 1644 mm with September as the wettest month. The temperatures are highest on average in January, at around 26.2 °C, and lowest in January, at around 5.1 °C.

== Demographics ==
Per Japanese census data, the population of Yawatahama has been decreasing steadily since the 1950s.

Historical population
Year	Pop.	±%
1950	72,412	—
1960	67,173	−7.2%
1970	58,545	−12.8%
1980	55,757	−4.8%
1990	50,217	−9.9%
2000	44,206	−12.0%
2010	38,370	−13.2%
2020	31,987	−16.6%

== History ==
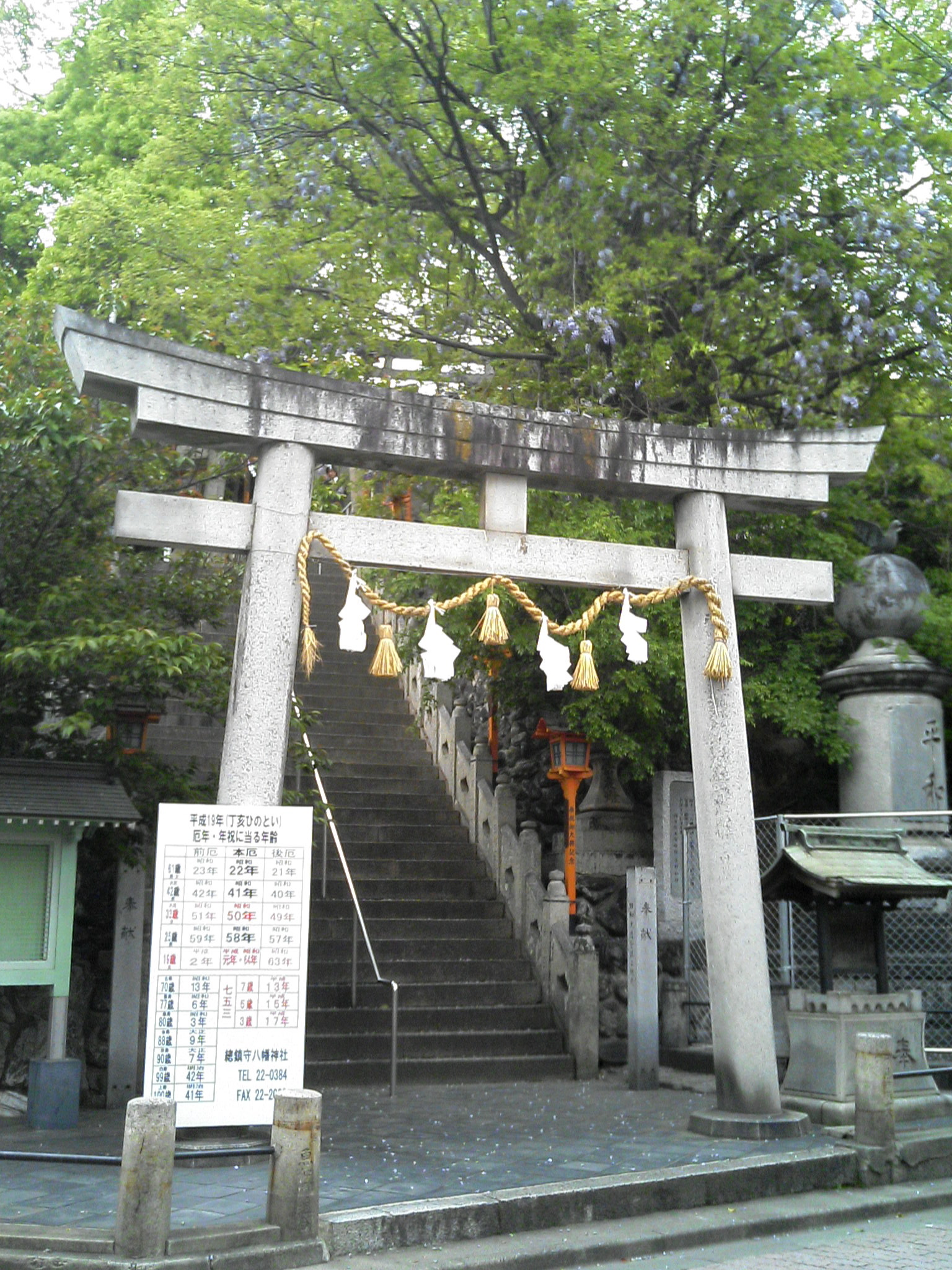
The entrance to Yawatahama's Hachiman Shrine

The area of Yawatahama was part of ancient Iyo Province, and its name appears in early Nara period documents. According to legend, the name "Yawatahama" (八幡浜) comes from long ago when debris from a festival at the Usa Hachiman shrine (八幡) in Usa, Ōita, floated up on the beach (浜) in what is now Yawatahama.

In the Edo Period, the area was part of the holding of the Date clan of Uwajima Domain. After the Meiji restoration, the town of Yawatahama was established with the creation of the modern municipalities system on April 1, 1889. However, even before that time, Yawatahama was linked to Osaka and Oita via steamships and the area was referred to as the "Manchester of Shikoku" due to rapidly increasing industrialization. The first bank in Ehime was opened in Yawatahama in 1878. In addition, in 1889, Yawatahama was the first city in Shikoku to burn an electric light.

=== Town mergers ===
- February 11, 1935 - Yawatahama combined with Senjo, Hitada, and Kamiyama and was elevated to city status.
- February 1, 1955 - A locality of Futaiwa, as well as Hizuchi, Maana, and Kawakami were added.
- March 31, 1955 - Nishiuwa District's Isotsu, Miyauchi, Kawanoishi, and Kisuki towns merge under the name Honai.
- March 28, 2005 - Yawatahama absorbed the town of Honai (from Nishiuwa District)

== Government ==
Yawatahama has a mayor-council form of government with a directly elected mayor and a unicameral city council of 16 members. Yawatahama together with Ikata, contributes two members to the Ehime Prefectural Assembly.

In terms of national politics, Yawatahama is part of Ehime 3rd district of the lower house of the Diet of Japan. Prior to 2022, the city was part of Ehime 4th district.

== Economy ==
Major industries include citrus farming, fisheries, fisheries-related food processing, and shipbuilding. Mandarin orange cultivation is started in the middle of the Meiji era, and has a history of 100 years. The fishery industry is thriving with trawl fishing as the core, as well as aquaculture. The fish market in Yawatahama is the largest in Shikoku.Yawatahama's marine product industry extends beyond just fresh fish. The town also specializes in fish products including fish paste and fishcakes made from pureed white fish. This is known as kamaboko. Yawatahama, along with Uwajima, have numerous shops selling a variety of kamaboko. One local delicacy is jakoten (じゃこ天), or kamaboko fried tempura-style.Yawatahama's mikan production is governed by the Nishiuwa Agricultural cooperative, which is responsible for the distribution and branding of Yawatahama mikans. This cooperative distributes the fruits nationwide under such brand names as "Hinomaru" (日の丸) and "Kawakami" (川上). However agricultural production is declining due to aging demographics and rural depopulation.

== Education ==
Yawatahama has 14 public elementary schools and four public middle schools operated by the city government. The city has three public high schools operated by the Ehime Prefectural Board of Education.

=== High schools ===
- Kawanoishi High School
- Yawatahama High School
- Yawatahama Technical High School

=== Junior high schools ===
- Atago Junior High School
- Honai Junior High School
- Matsukaya Junior High School
- Yashiro Junior High School

== Transportation ==
=== Railways ===
Shikoku Railway Company - Yosan Line

- Senjō - Yawatahama - Futaiwa

=== Highways ===
- Matsuyama Expressway
- National Route 197
- National Route 378

=== Ports ===
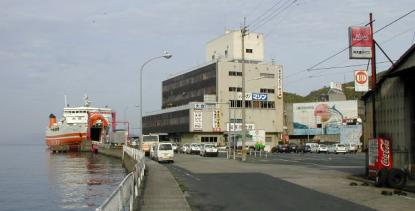
Yawatahama Port

- Port of Yawatahama - which provides regular ferry services to the cities of Usuki, Ōita and Beppu, Ōita on Kyūshū.

== Noted people from Yawatahama ==
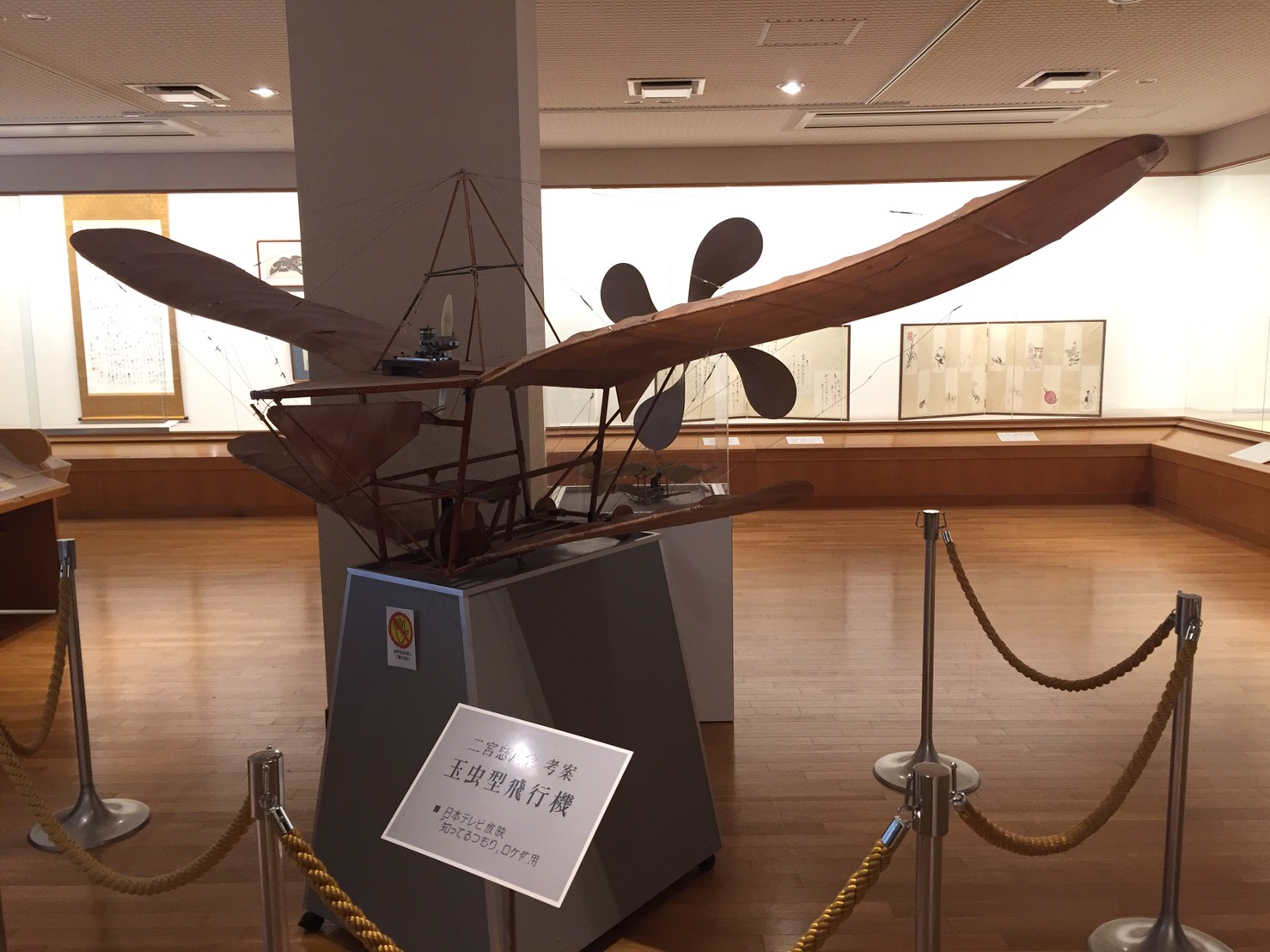
A Chūhachi Ninomiya's a beetle-sheped airplane, created in October 1893, which show on Yawatahama Municipal Library

- Maedayama Eigorō, a sumo wrestler who was the sport's 39th Yokozuna
- Moriyuki Kato, the governor of Ehime Prefecture
- Chūhachi Ninomiya, a Japanese aviation pioneer
- Jōkō Ninomiya, founder and director of Enshin Karate

== In popular culture ==
Yawatahama Port was featured in the 2022 anime film Suzume. A door similar to the one featured in the film was set up in April 2023 in the port.
