= Seiyo =

Seiyo 西予市
- City
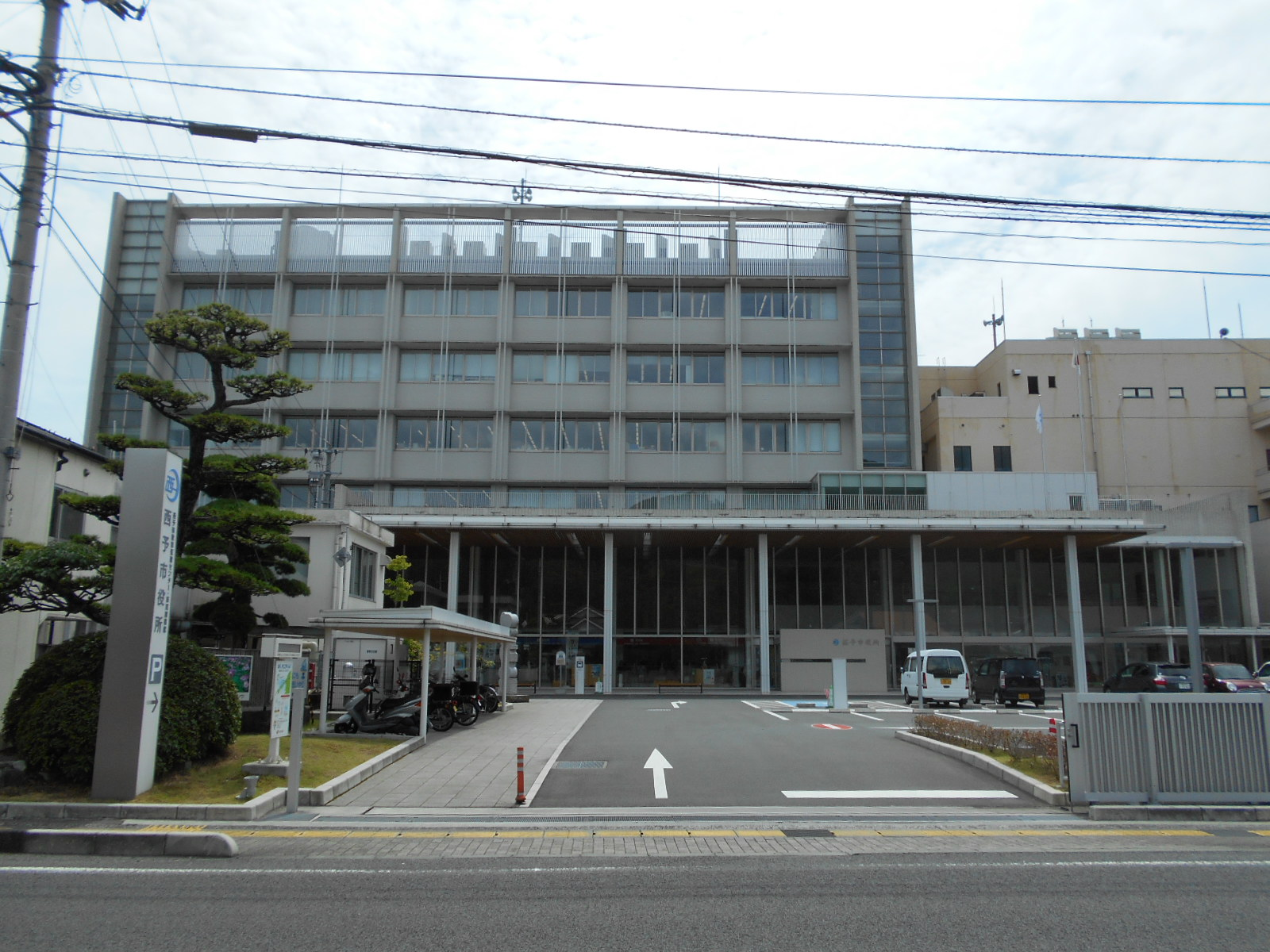
- Seiwa City Hall

- Flag Seal
- Location of Seiyo in Ehime Prefecture

- Location in Japan
- Coordinates: 33°21′46″N 132°30′39″E
- Country: Japan
- Region: Shikoku
- Prefecture: Ehime

Government
  - Mayor: Kazuo Kanke (since May 2016)

Area
  - Total: 514.34 km^{2} (198.59 sq mi)

Population (August 31, 2022)
  - Total: 35,456
  - Density: 68.935/km^{2} (178.54/sq mi)
- Time zone: UTC+09:00 (JST)
- City hall address: 3-434-1 Unomachi, Uwachō, Seiyo-shi, Ehime-ken 797-8501
- Website: Official website
- Symbols
- Bird: Japanese bush warbler (鶯, uguisu)
- Flower: Chinese milkvetch (蓮華草, rengesō)
- Tree: Japanese beech (山毛欅, buna)

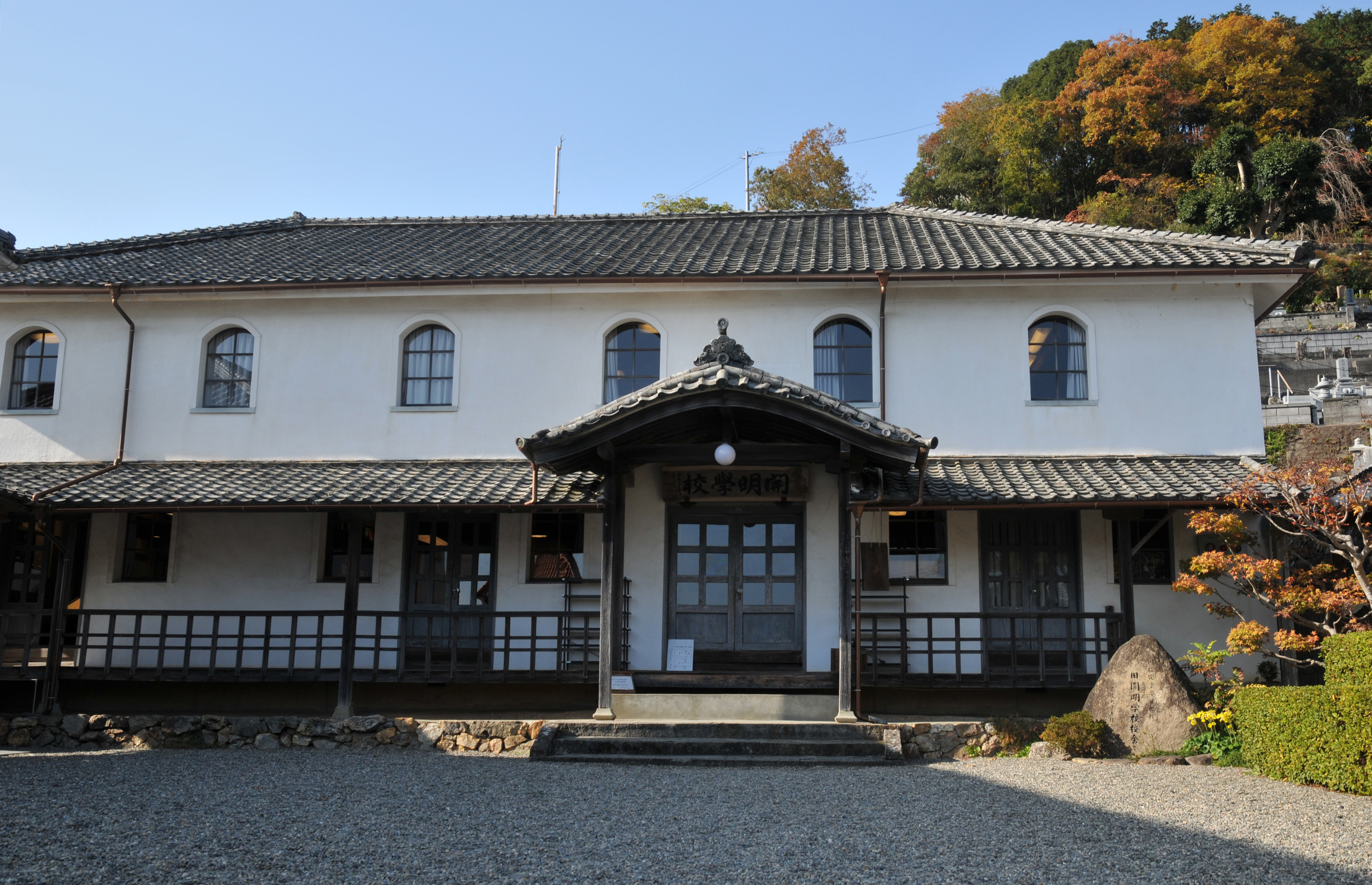
Kaimei Gakko

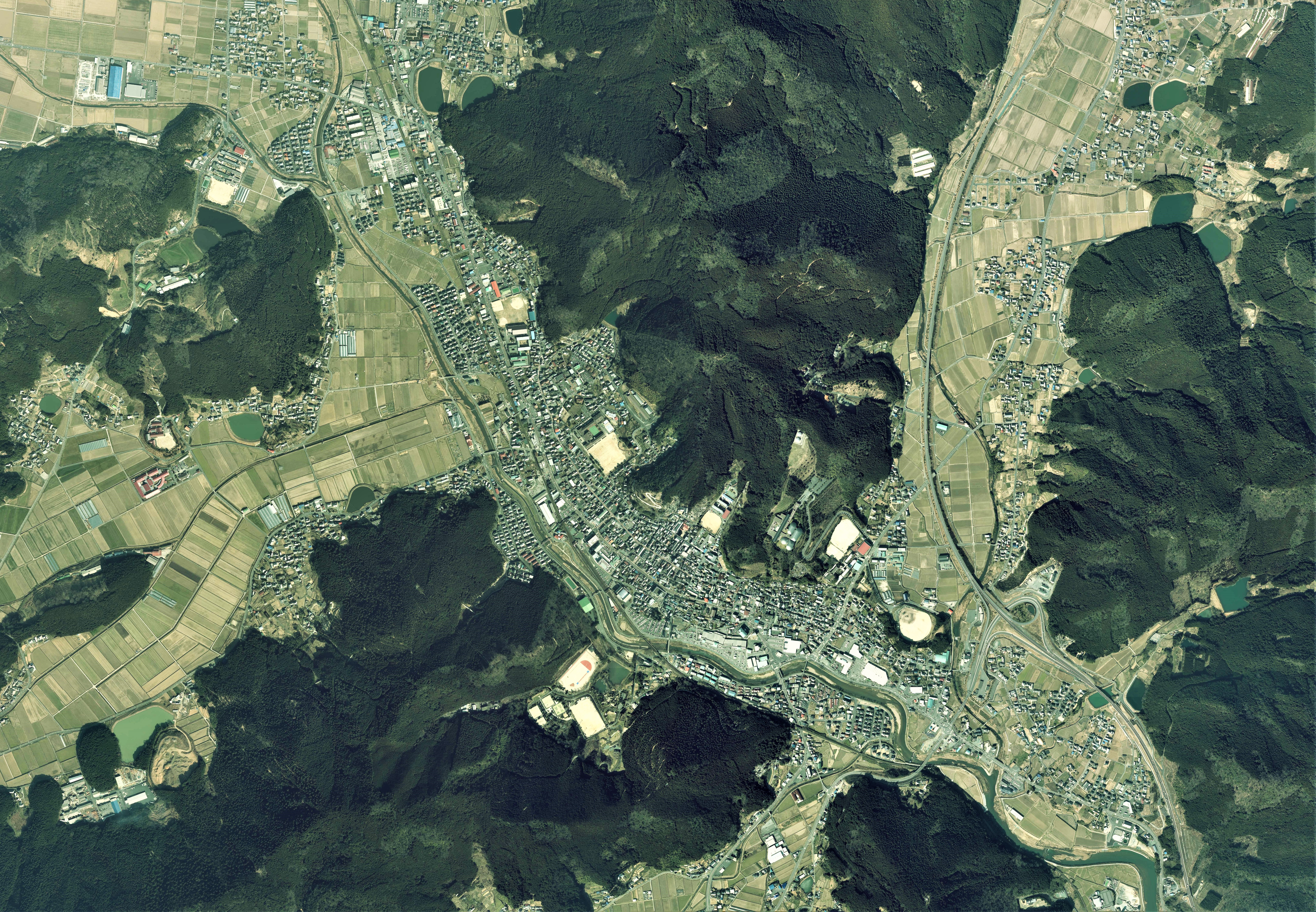
Aerial view of Unomachi neighborhood of Seiyo

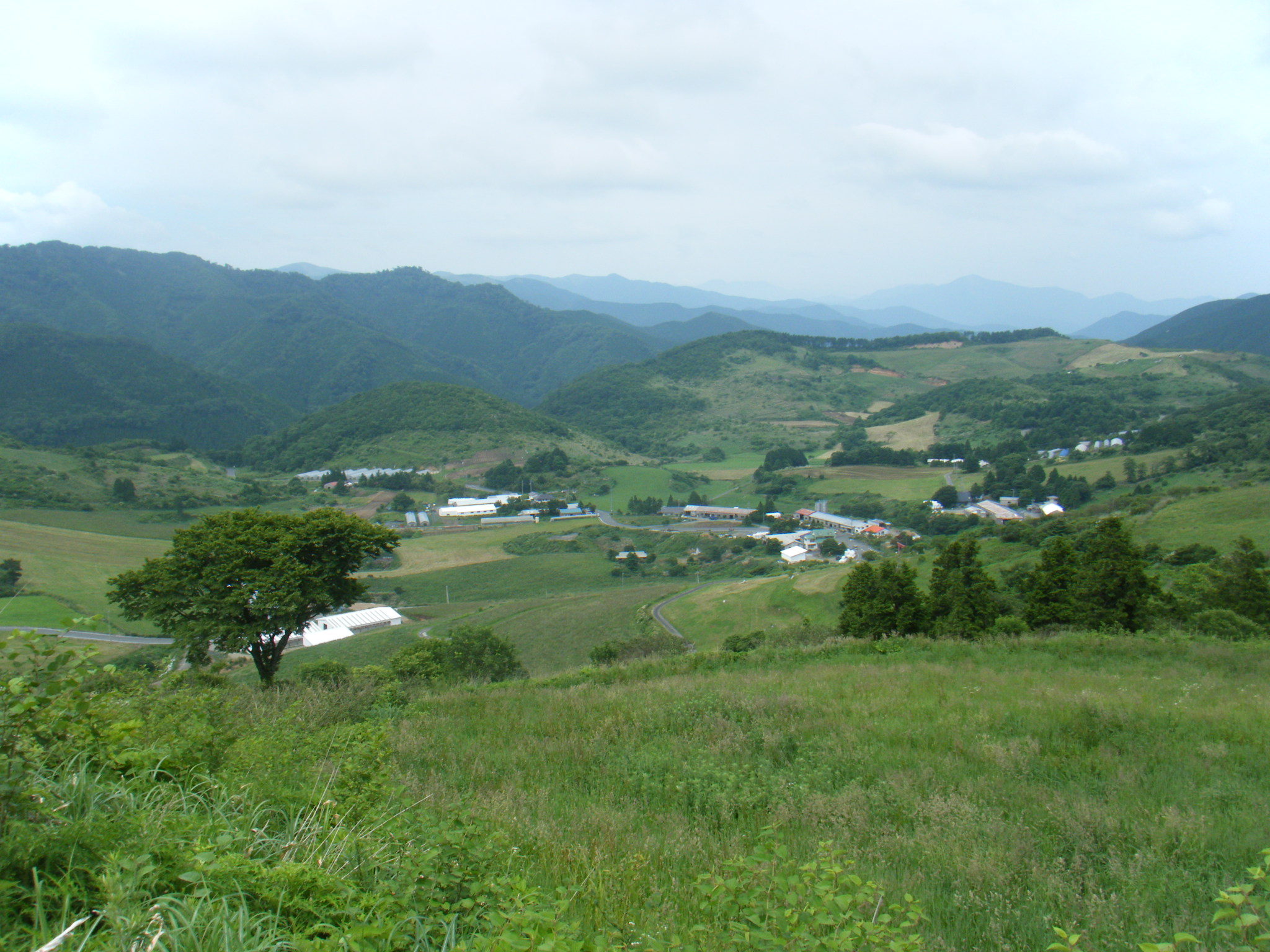
Onogahara in Seiyo

Seiyo (西予市, Seiyo-shi) is a city located in Ehime Prefecture, Japan. As of 31 August 2022, the city had an estimated population of 35,456 in 17627 households and a population density of 69 persons per km². The total area of the city is 514.34 square kilometres (198.59 sq mi).

== Geography ==
Seiyo is located in southeastern Ehime Prefecture, with Uwa Bay on the Seto Inland Sea to the west, and with the Shikoku Mountains to the east, with a difference in elevation of 1403 meters. The city area is long from east to west and due to its diverse topography, it was certified as a Japanese Geopark (Shikoku Seiyo Geopark) by the Japan Geoparks Committee on September 24, 2013. Onogahara, which is part of the Shikoku Karst, one of Japan's three major karst landscape, is very beautiful with its green grassland and white limestone. Komatsu is home to Rakan Cave, one of the largest caves in Shikoku, which is open to the public as a show cave with a length of 700 meters.

=== Neighbouring municipalities ===
Ehime Prefecture

- Ikata
- Kihoku
- Kumakōgen
- Ōzu
- Uchiko
- Uwajima
- Yawatahama

Kōchi Prefecture

- Yusuhara

=== Climate ===
Seiyo has a diverse climate, from the inland mountain plateau (Onogahara), where more than 2 meters of snow accumulates in winter, to the warm coastal area, and the basin with a lot of fog due to the influence of two dams. During the typhoon season, coastal areas are often damaged by high tides and high waves, and mountainous areas are often damaged by landslides caused by heavy rain. The temperature can differ by more than 10 degrees between the coastal area and Onogahara. In general, Seiyo has a humid subtropical climate (Köppen Cfa) characterized by warm summers and cool winters with light snowfall. The average annual temperature in Seiyo is 15.3 °C. The average annual rainfall is 1663 mm with September as the wettest month. The temperatures are highest on average in January, at around 26.1 °C, and lowest in January, at around 4.7 °C.

Climate data for Uwa, Ehime (1991−2020 normals, extremes 1978−present)
Month	Jan	Feb	Mar	Apr	May	Jun	Jul	Aug	Sep	Oct	Nov	Dec	Year
Record high °C (°F)	19.7 (67.5)	22.3 (72.1)	25.5 (77.9)	29.0 (84.2)	33.2 (91.8)	34.9 (94.8)	36.6 (97.9)	38.4 (101.1)	35.4 (95.7)	32.5 (90.5)	26.3 (79.3)	22.3 (72.1)	38.4 (101.1)
Mean daily maximum °C (°F)	8.8 (47.8)	10.2 (50.4)	14.0 (57.2)	19.4 (66.9)	24.1 (75.4)	26.7 (80.1)	30.7 (87.3)	32.0 (89.6)	28.4 (83.1)	22.9 (73.2)	17.1 (62.8)	11.3 (52.3)	20.5 (68.8)
Daily mean °C (°F)	4.3 (39.7)	5.2 (41.4)	8.5 (47.3)	13.5 (56.3)	18.2 (64.8)	21.8 (71.2)	25.8 (78.4)	26.6 (79.9)	23.0 (73.4)	17.2 (63.0)	11.6 (52.9)	6.3 (43.3)	15.2 (59.3)
Mean daily minimum °C (°F)	0.1 (32.2)	0.5 (32.9)	3.1 (37.6)	7.6 (45.7)	12.8 (55.0)	17.9 (64.2)	22.1 (71.8)	22.6 (72.7)	18.9 (66.0)	12.5 (54.5)	6.8 (44.2)	2.0 (35.6)	10.6 (51.0)
Record low °C (°F)	−9.1 (15.6)	−12.0 (10.4)	−5.9 (21.4)	−2.2 (28.0)	1.9 (35.4)	7.6 (45.7)	12.4 (54.3)	14.8 (58.6)	7.4 (45.3)	1.0 (33.8)	−2.0 (28.4)	−8.2 (17.2)	−12.0 (10.4)
Average precipitation mm (inches)	76.1 (3.00)	94.8 (3.73)	139.1 (5.48)	152.1 (5.99)	189.0 (7.44)	311.0 (12.24)	282.7 (11.13)	140.3 (5.52)	197.8 (7.79)	125.0 (4.92)	101.5 (4.00)	91.0 (3.58)	1,927.5 (75.89)
Average precipitation days (≥ 1.0 mm)	10.4	10.1	11.6	10.2	9.4	13.6	10.8	8.9	10.3	8.3	8.8	11.0	123.4
Mean monthly sunshine hours	107.9	126.5	162.5	186.7	200.1	136.2	188.2	215.3	159.1	166.3	130.4	104.7	1,873.8
Source: Japan Meteorological Agency

== Demographics ==
Per Japanese census data, the population of Seiyo has decreased steadily since the 1960s.

Historical population
Year	Pop.	±%
1960	79,525	—
1970	61,009	−23.3%
1980	56,175	−7.9%
1990	51,893	−7.6%
2000	47,217	−9.0%
2010	42,080	−10.9%
2020	35,388	−15.9%

== History ==
The area of Seiyo was part of ancient Iyo Province. During the Edo period, the area was part of the holdings of Uwajima Domain or its subsidiary Iyo-Yoshida Domain. Following the Meiji restoration, the area was organized into towns and villages within Higashiuwa District and Nishiuwa District in Ehime Prefecture. The city of Seiyo was established on April 1, 2004, from the merger of the towns of Akehama, Nomura, Shirokawa and Uwa (all from Higashiuwa District), and the town of Mikame (from Nishiuwa District).

== Government ==
Seiyo has a mayor-council form of government with a directly elected mayor and a unicameral city council of 18 members. Seiyo contributes one member to the Ehime Prefectural Assembly.

In terms of national politics, Seiyo is part of Ehime 3rd district of the lower house of the Diet of Japan. Prior to 2022, the city was part of Ehime 4th district.

== Economy ==
The industrial base of Seiyo is weak and the economy is poor. In the past, the Uwa neighborhood (Unomachi) and the Nomura neighborhood were distribution points for rural goods, but due to poor transportation connection and rural depopulation, commerce has declined. The main economic activity is agriculture, with citrus fruits, rice and chestnuts are mainly cultivated. Animal husbandry (pigs, dairy cows, beef cattle) is also practiced.

== Education ==
Seiyo has 12 public elementary schools and five public middle schools operated by the city government. The city has three public high schools operated by the Ehime Prefectural Board of Education, and the prefecture also operates two special education schools for the handicapped.

== Transportation ==
=== Railways ===
Shikoku Railway Company - Yosan Line

- Iyo-Iwaki - Kamiuwa - Unomachi - Shimouwa

=== Highways ===
- Matsuyama Expressway
- National Route 56
- National Route 197
- National Route 378
- National Route 441

== Local attractions ==
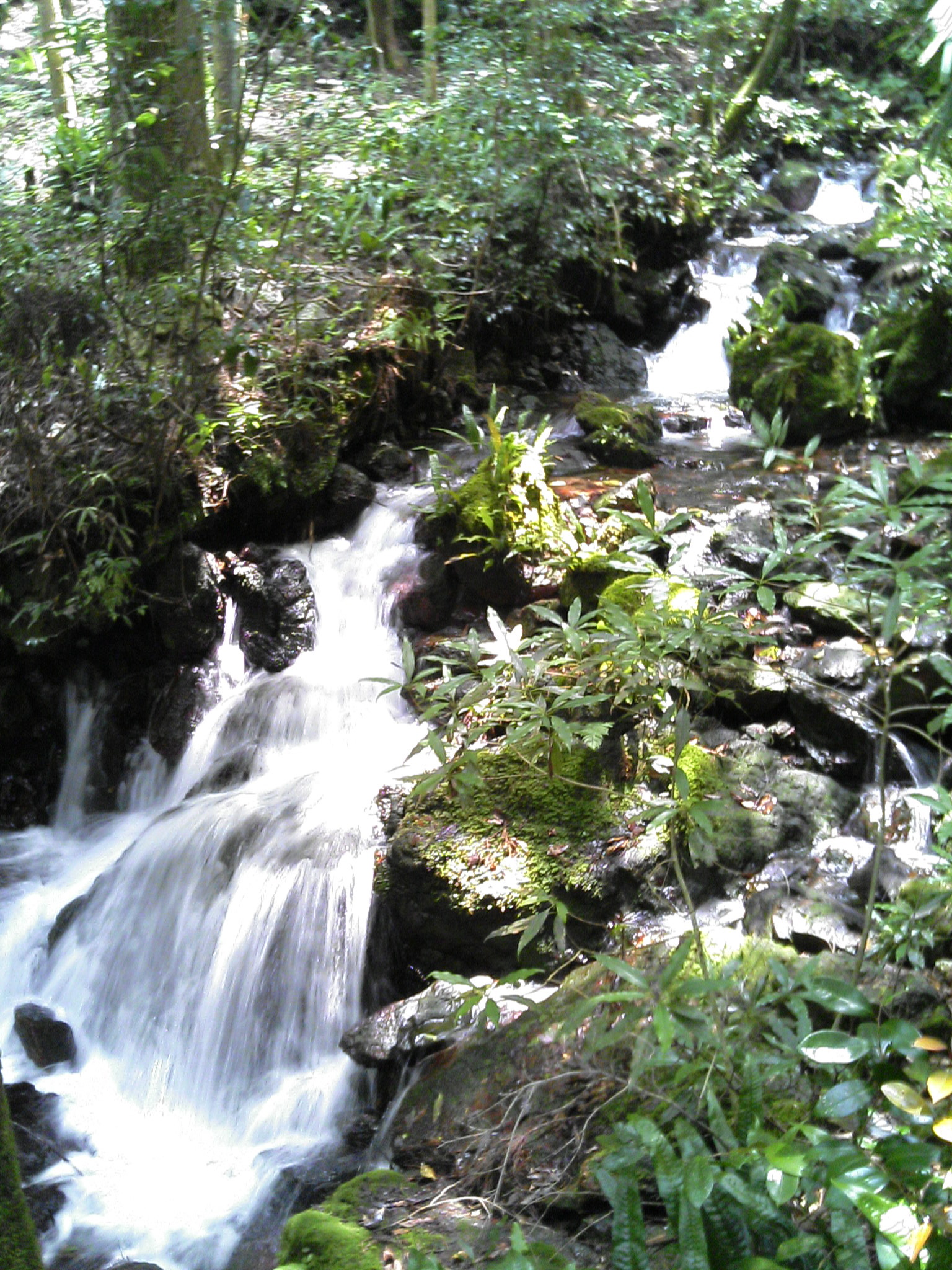
A small waterfall of Kannon Spring Water

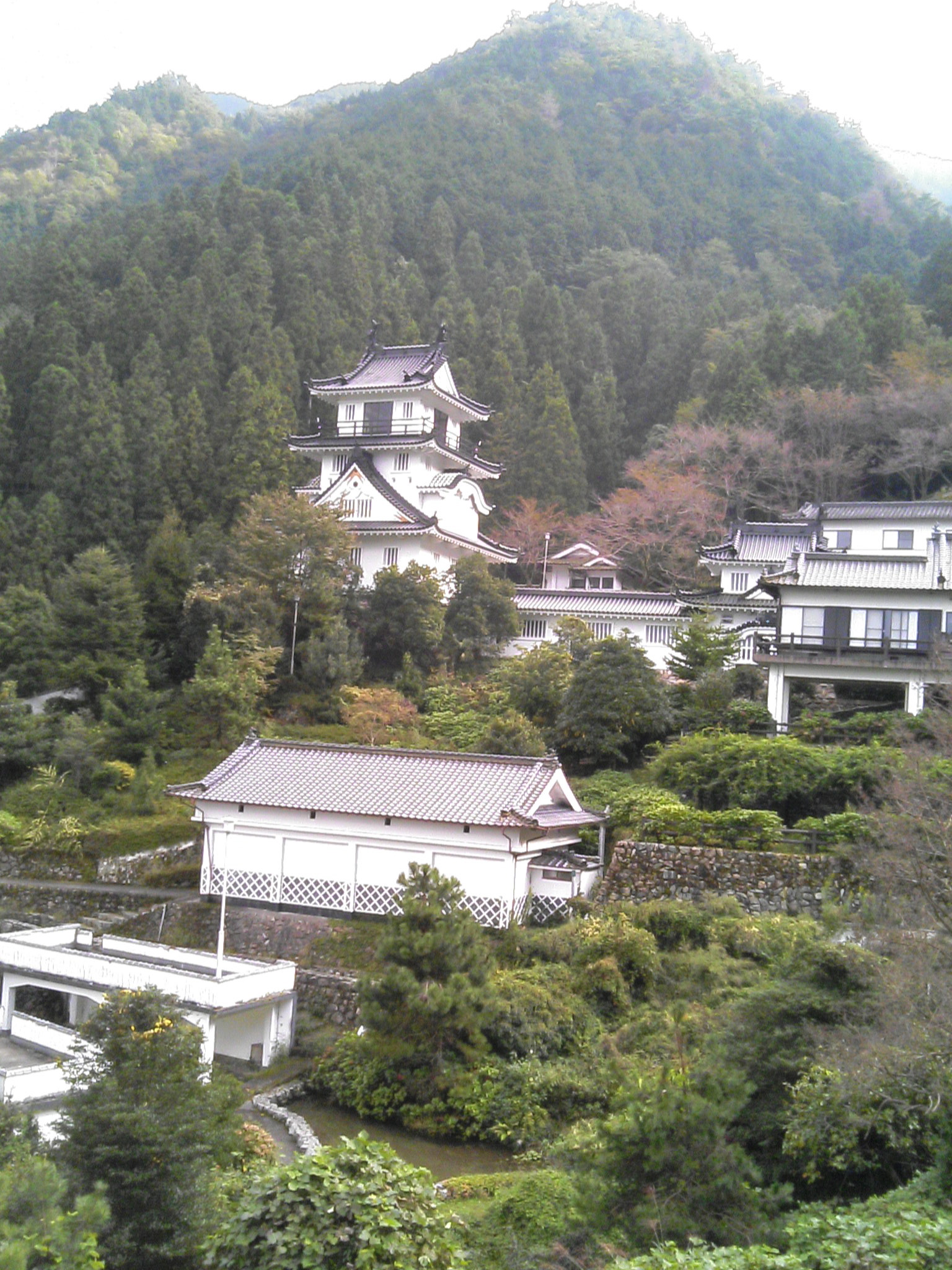
Castle Land

=== Castle Land ===
A wealthy eccentric built a castle on the side of a mountain near the Nomura Dam in the former town of Nomura. It was originally a retreat for parties, complete with overnight lodging facilities. It never achieved any measure of popularity, and the owner eventually donated it to the city of Seiyo. It now lies uninhabited and largely unused.

=== Kannon Spring Water ===
In the former town of Uwa there is a natural spring, the water of which is known as Kannon Spring Water (観音水, Kannon-sui). This water was designated as one of Japan's 100 best water sources (名水百選, meisui hyakusen) by the Ministry of the Environment in March 1985. Hiking trails along the spring's mountain rivers are a popular destination in the summertime. The spring is also used for sōmen nagashi (そうめん流し), a Japanese cuisine where bundles of cold sōmen noodles are set into a stream of water that flows down a track, with hungry patrons waiting alongside.

=== Otoi Sumo ===
The former town of Nomura, now a part of Seiyo, holds an annual sumo competition for children and amateur adults known as the Otoi Sumo (乙亥大相撲, Otoi ōzumō) Tournament. It is held after the Kyushu basho and usually attracts a few professional sumo wrestlers.

=== Museums ===
- Kaimei School
- Museum of Ehime History and Culture

=== Shrine and temples ===
- Meiseki-ji, 43rd temple on the Shikoku Pilgrimage
