= Sadamisaki Hantō-Uwakai Prefectural Natural Park =

Natural park in Ehime prefecture, Japan

- 佐田岬半島宇和海県立自然公園
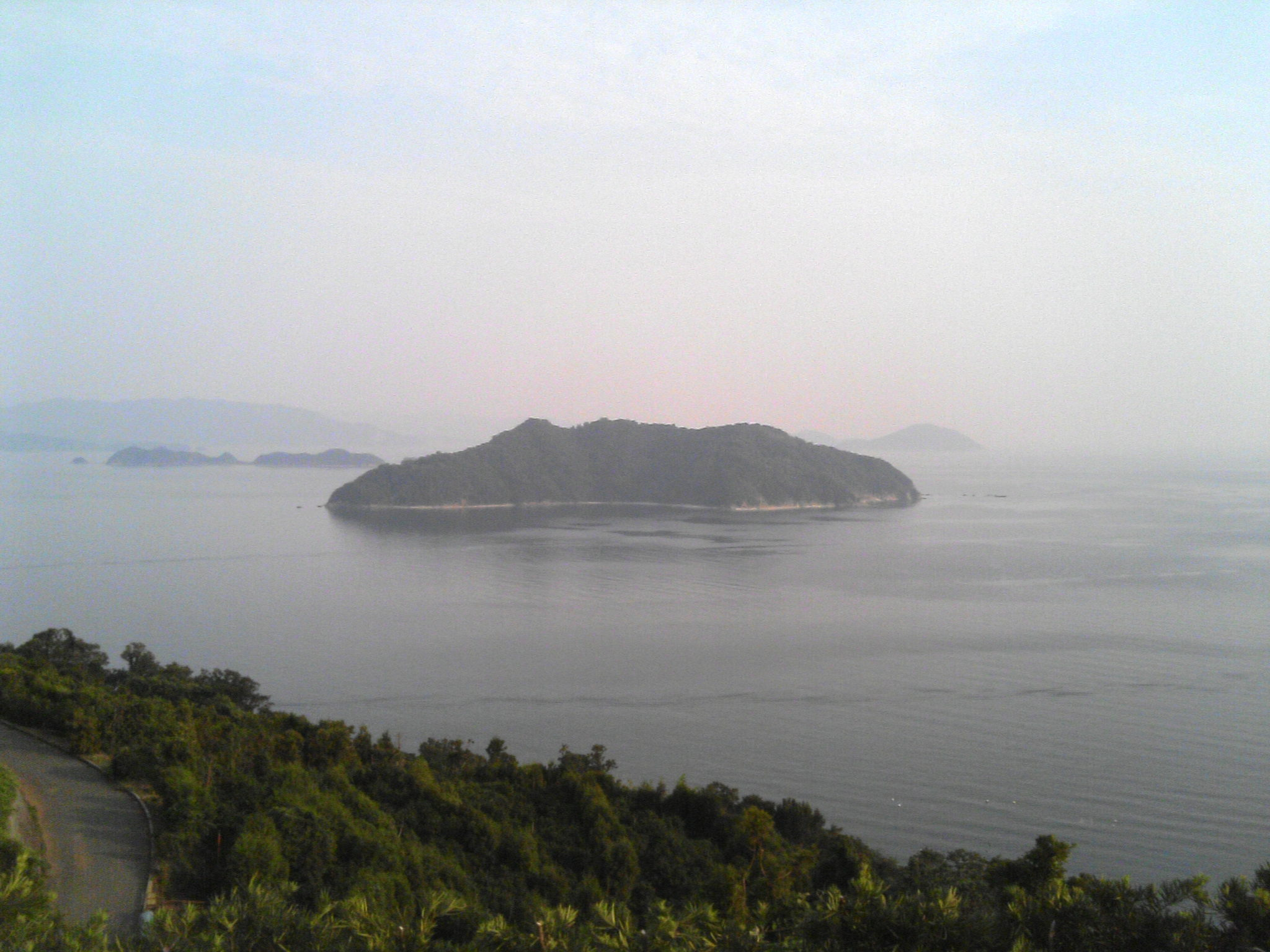
- Kuroshima

- Location within Ehime Prefecture Location within Japan
- Location: Ehime Prefecture, Japan
- Nearest city: Ikata, Seiyo, Yawatahama
- Coordinates: 33°23′10″N 132°20′28″E
- Area: 5.17 square kilometres (2.00 sq mi); 10.207 square kilometres (3.941 sq mi) (including marine area)
- Established: 15 October 1965

Sadamisaki Hantō-Uwakai Prefectural Natural Park (佐田岬半島宇和海県立自然公園, Sadamisaki Hantō-Uwakai kenritsu shizen-kōen) is a Prefectural Natural Park in Ehime Prefecture, Japan. Established in 1965, the park spans the borders of the municipalities of Ikata, Seiyo, and Yawatahama. The park's central features are the eponymous Sadamisaki Peninsula and Uwa Sea, including the islands in the northern Uwa Sea and parts of the coastline.

== See also ==
- National Parks of Japan
- Ashizuri-Uwakai National Park
