= Ikata =

Ikata 伊方町
- Town
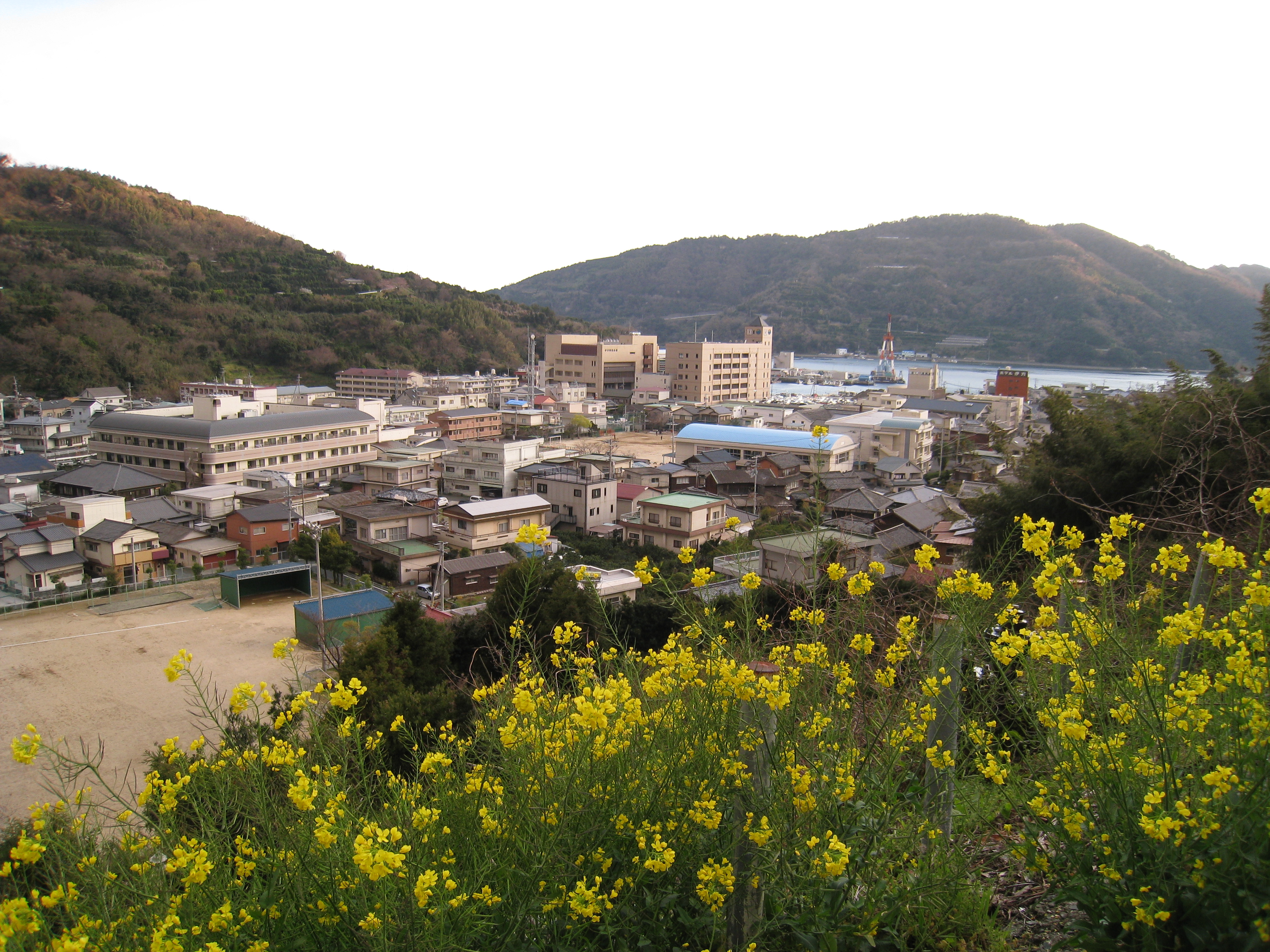
- The Minatoura neighborhood

- Flag Logo
- Interactive map of Ikata
- Location in Japan
- Coordinates: 33°29′N 132°21′E
- Country: Japan
- Region: Shikoku
- Prefecture: Ehime
- District: Nishiuwa

Government
  - Mayor: Kiyohiko Takakado

Area
  - Total: 93.98 km^{2} (36.29 sq mi)

Population (August 31, 2022)
  - Total: 8,497
  - Density: 90.41/km^{2} (234.2/sq mi)
- Time zone: UTC+09:00 (JST)
- City hall address: 1993-1 Minatoura, Ikata-chō, Nishiuwa-gun, Ehime-ken 796-0301
- Website: Official website
- Symbols
- Flower: Farfugium japonicum (石蕗, Tsuwabuki)
- Tree: Quercus phillyraeoides (姥目樫, Ubamegashi)

Ikata (伊方町, Ikata-chō) is a small peninsula town located in Nishiuwa District, Ehime Prefecture, Japan. As of 31 August 2022, the town had an estimated population of 8,497 in 15638 households and a population density of 90 persons per km^{2}. The total area of the town is 93.98 square kilometres (36.29 sq mi)

Following a recent merger with the neighboring towns of Misaki and Seto, the town now spans the mountainous Sadamisaki Peninsula, the narrowest peninsula in Japan and the westernmost point on the island of Shikoku.

This geography has influenced Ikata's growth. On the one hand, it has presented challenges to urban development that were not overcome until recently in the town's long history. On the other, the peninsula is what gives the town its mountain and ocean scenery which, bolstered by significant investments in infrastructure and tourist facilities, has formed the basis for a burgeoning tourism industry.

In addition to the beauty of its rugged, natural landscape, Ikata has long been known for fishing and mikan orange farming. In recent years Ikata has also become a hotspot of modern energy production—the Ikata Nuclear Power Plant produced much of Shikoku's electricity until it was shut down in 2012 following the 2011 Tōhoku earthquake and tsunami (before being reactivated in 2018), and the town's windy mountains are dotted by dozens of windmills.

== Geography ==
A map of Ikata's neighborhoods

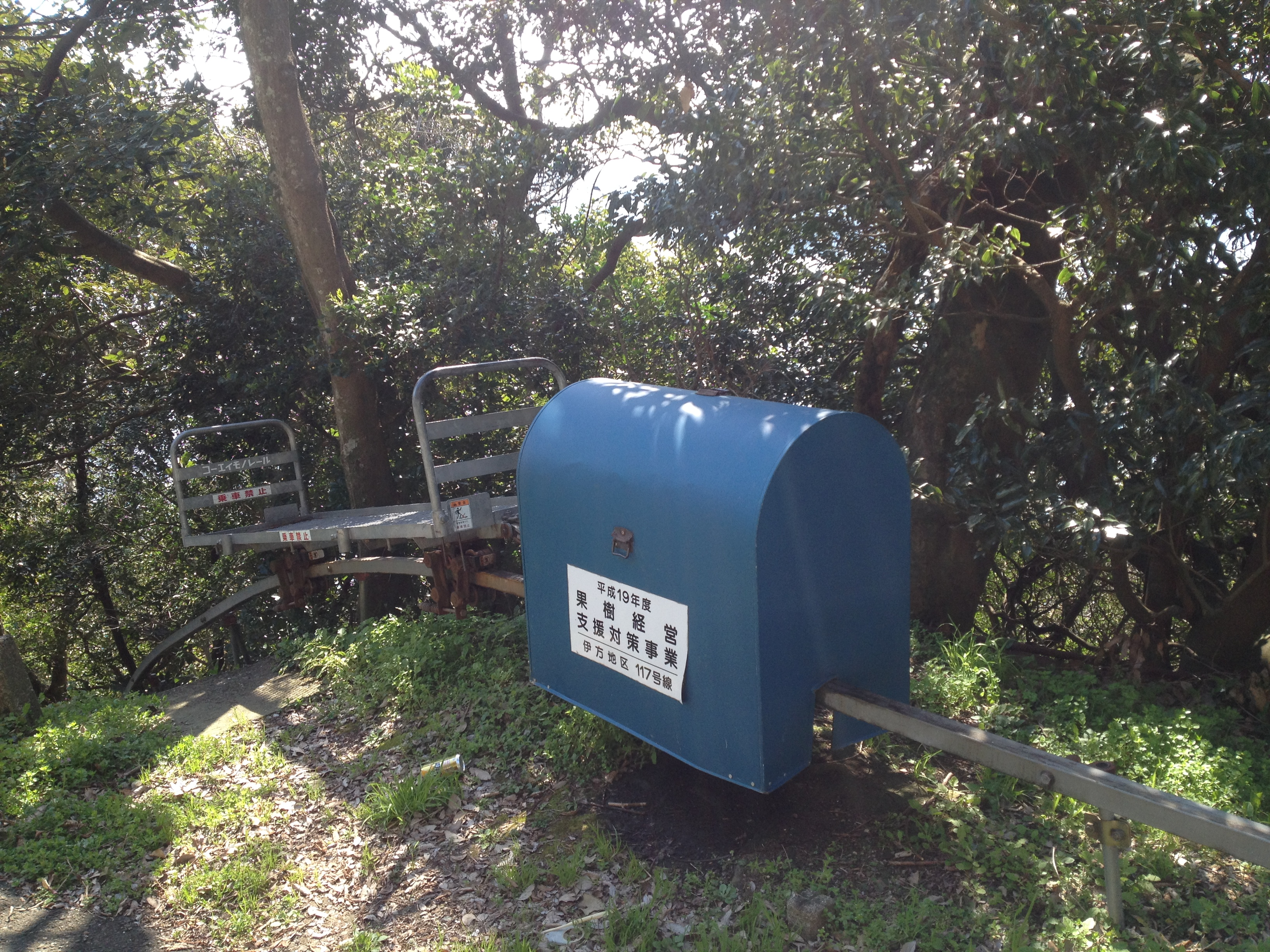
Rail vehicle for transporting mikan oranges near Misaki

Ikata is on the Sadamisaki Peninsula, Japan's narrowest peninsula and the westernmost point on the island of Shikoku. The peninsula is extremely mountainous, with steep cliffs and precious little usable flat land. To combat this, the town's bays and ponds have seen vigorous coastal reclamation efforts dating back to the early Meiji period (late 1800s). Ikata's mountainsides are covered with terraced mikan fields, and natural forest in the undeveloped areas.

The various neighborhoods of Ikata are found nestled among the foothills of the mountains, connected only by winding coastal roads and a single highway, Route 197. The biggest of the neighborhoods and the administrative center of Ikata is Minatoura, near the eastern edge of the town.

Ikata is surrounded on three sides by ocean—the Iyo Sea (part of the Inland Sea) to the north, the Uwa Sea (Pacific Ocean) to the south, and the Hōyo Strait (separating Shikoku from Kyūshū) to the west.

=== Neighbouring municipalities ===
- Ehime Prefecture
  - Yawatahama

=== Climate ===
The climate in Ikata is warm, with an average year-round temperature of 16–17 °C (61–63 °F) and more than 1,500 mm (59.06 in) of yearly rain. The coldest parts of winter remain above freezing (5 °C (41 °F) on average), with snowfall seen only once or twice per year. Rain is concentrated in the rainy season in June and July, and also in September.

The length of the peninsula makes accurate weather prediction difficult for the town; when driving down Melody Line, it is not uncommon to find it sunny between one set of tunnels, rainy between another, and foggy between yet another. Ikata's position, stretching out into the ocean, also makes it a frequent target for typhoons.

Climate data for Seto, Ehime (1997−2020 normals, extremes 1997−present)
Month	Jan	Feb	Mar	Apr	May	Jun	Jul	Aug	Sep	Oct	Nov	Dec	Year
Record high °C (°F)	18.6 (65.5)	21.1 (70.0)	24.4 (75.9)	26.6 (79.9)	31.0 (87.8)	31.9 (89.4)	33.6 (92.5)	35.2 (95.4)	34.0 (93.2)	30.7 (87.3)	26.2 (79.2)	21.4 (70.5)	35.2 (95.4)
Mean daily maximum °C (°F)	8.8 (47.8)	9.7 (49.5)	12.7 (54.9)	17.4 (63.3)	21.5 (70.7)	24.1 (75.4)	27.9 (82.2)	29.6 (85.3)	26.3 (79.3)	21.6 (70.9)	16.7 (62.1)	11.5 (52.7)	19.0 (66.2)
Daily mean °C (°F)	6.7 (44.1)	7.2 (45.0)	9.7 (49.5)	13.9 (57.0)	18.0 (64.4)	21.0 (69.8)	24.8 (76.6)	26.2 (79.2)	23.4 (74.1)	19.2 (66.6)	14.4 (57.9)	9.2 (48.6)	16.1 (61.1)
Mean daily minimum °C (°F)	4.6 (40.3)	4.9 (40.8)	7.0 (44.6)	11.0 (51.8)	15.1 (59.2)	18.7 (65.7)	22.7 (72.9)	24.0 (75.2)	21.4 (70.5)	17.2 (63.0)	12.3 (54.1)	7.1 (44.8)	13.8 (56.9)
Record low °C (°F)	−4.8 (23.4)	−3.7 (25.3)	−1.8 (28.8)	4.7 (40.5)	8.9 (48.0)	14.0 (57.2)	17.5 (63.5)	18.6 (65.5)	14.3 (57.7)	8.7 (47.7)	2.8 (37.0)	−3.3 (26.1)	−4.8 (23.4)
Average precipitation mm (inches)	65.1 (2.56)	75.1 (2.96)	110.5 (4.35)	118.2 (4.65)	155.8 (6.13)	285.7 (11.25)	218.7 (8.61)	104.9 (4.13)	193.9 (7.63)	138.6 (5.46)	85.8 (3.38)	74.4 (2.93)	1,627.7 (64.08)
Average precipitation days (≥ 1.0 mm)	8.3	8.6	9.8	9.7	8.9	12.5	10.0	6.7	9.9	7.4	7.3	8.1	107.2
Mean monthly sunshine hours	122.7	138.2	186.8	202.0	213.6	150.5	195.2	238.4	178.0	171.0	140.0	117.3	2,041.6
Source: JMA

== Demographics ==
Ikata's population broken down by region

Ikata is a small town, with a population of 8,196 as of June 30, 2023. The total land area of the town is 94.37 km^{2}, making the population density 113 persons per km^{2}. However, much of the land on the peninsula is quite mountainous and not suited for development; the population density of the individual settlements, which are squeezed into the small bay areas in the foothills of the mountains, is much higher. Extrapolating from data based on the most recent land survey, only 3.21% of the town's land is inhabited; this puts the population density at a much higher 3,510 persons/kilometer-squared.

Like much of rural Japan, Ikata faces a rapidly declining and aging population. According to the Ikata website, roughly 40% of the town's population is 65 or older. Furthermore, many elementary and middle schools have closed since the 1970s. Those that remain have very small student populations. For example, Ikata Elementary School is Ikata's largest elementary school; there were 303 students in 1987, 162 in 2006, and 128 in 2014; Toyonoura Elementary was Old Ikata's smallest school; it had 51 students in 1987, and only 14 in 2007. before it closed in 2010. Currently, Futami Elementary is Ikata's smallest Elementary school with 21 students. However, plans are in effect to close the school at the end of the current fiscal year (April, 2015).

Seto's population, broken down by age

This population issue was a significant part of the impetus for the recent merger of Old Ikata with Seto and Misaki. While Old Ikata is geographically more accessible, and has enjoyed the economic benefits of the Ikata Nuclear Power Plant, Seto and Misaki have experienced even more severe aging and decline of their populations. In 2000, Seto's working-age population dipped below 50% of its total.

Ethnically Ikata is extremely homogeneous with only a handful of non-Japanese residents, most of whom are either temporary farm laborers from China, or English educators on the JET Programme.

Per Japanese census data, the population of Ikata has been decreasing steadily since the 1950s, and is now less than third of what it was a century ago.

Historical population
Year	Pop.	±%
1920	30,940	—
1930	30,636	−1.0%
1940	28,791	−6.0%
1950	35,885	+24.6%
1960	30,366	−15.4%
1970	21,896	−27.9%
1980	18,753	−14.4%
1990	16,060	−14.4%
2000	13,536	−15.7%
2010	10,882	−19.6%
2020	8,397	−22.8%

== History ==
=== Prehistory ===
The Sadamisaki Peninsula area has been inhabited since at least the Jōmon period (10,000–300 BC), as evidenced by the discovery of stone tools and earthenware pots in the Misaki and Kushi neighborhoods.

In 1963 a local man discovered a stone ax dating to the mid-Yayoi period (300 BC–250 AD) in his farm plot in the Kawachi neighborhood. Upon further investigation by the Japan Archaeological Society in 1986, the area was recognized as containing the remains of a highland settlement (高地性集落, kōchisei shūraku). This is a type of settlement usually located several tens of meters above the surrounding area on mountainsides, and is peculiar to the Yayoi period.

=== Classical era ===
After the Taika Reform of 646, Ikata and the greater surrounding area became known as the Uwa District in 701. The Uwa District covered the entire Nanyo region (map) until it was split in two in 866. Since districts were defined by population, one can infer that the area was underdeveloped and sparsely populated at the time.

=== Feudal era ===
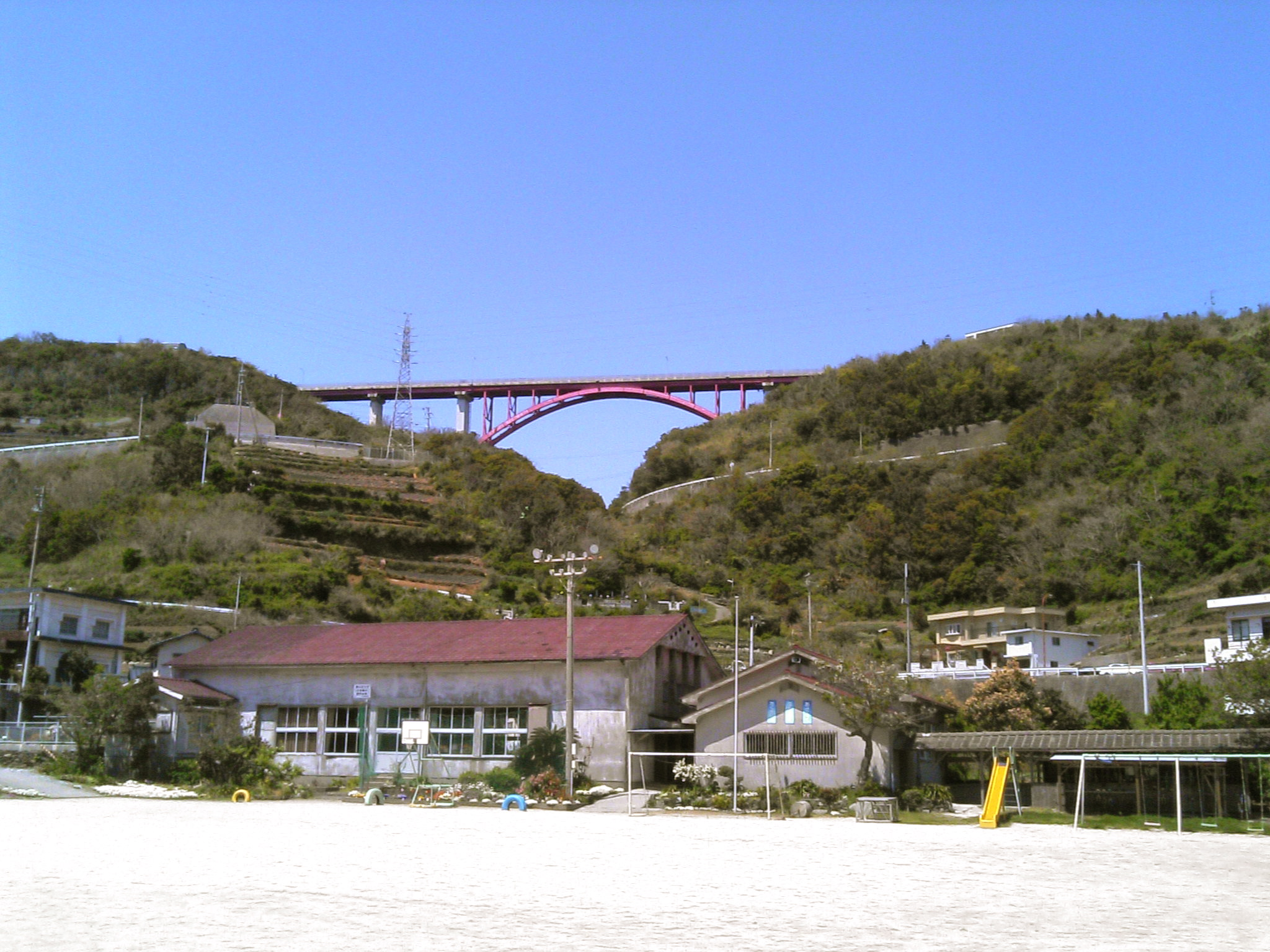
The Horikiri Bridge ("trench-cutting bridge"), spans the gorge where Nobutaka attempted to dig a canal through the peninsula

Towards the end of the Heian period, the Yawatahama and Ikata area became known as Yano (矢野郷, Yano-gō; later 矢野荘 Yano-shō). As ownership of farmlands became increasingly concentrated in the hands of local ruling families, control of the Yano area was given to Taira no Tadamitsu, a member of the Heike clan.

Some members of the Heike family secretly settled in the Seto area in 1185 after being defeated in the Genpei Wars.

Entering the Edo period and the Tokugawa shogunate, the Uwa District came under control of the Uwajima Domain (宇和島藩, Uwajima-han). From 1610 to 1612, the first Uwajima feudal lord, Tomita Nobutaka, gathered farmers from the local area to dig a canal through the thinnest part of the Sadamisaki Peninsula, Seto's Mitsukue neighborhood. The project was soon canceled due to insufficient funds. By this time, the name Ikata (伊方浦, Ikata-ura) can be seen in records of taxes paid to the feudal lords. The Mitsukue neighborhood prospered as a port town during the feudal period, as it was used as a port of rest for daimyō on their way to and from the capital as part of the sankin-kōtai system. This traffic was likely the source of the demand for Nobutaka's abortive attempt to create a shortcut through the peninsula.

=== Modern era ===
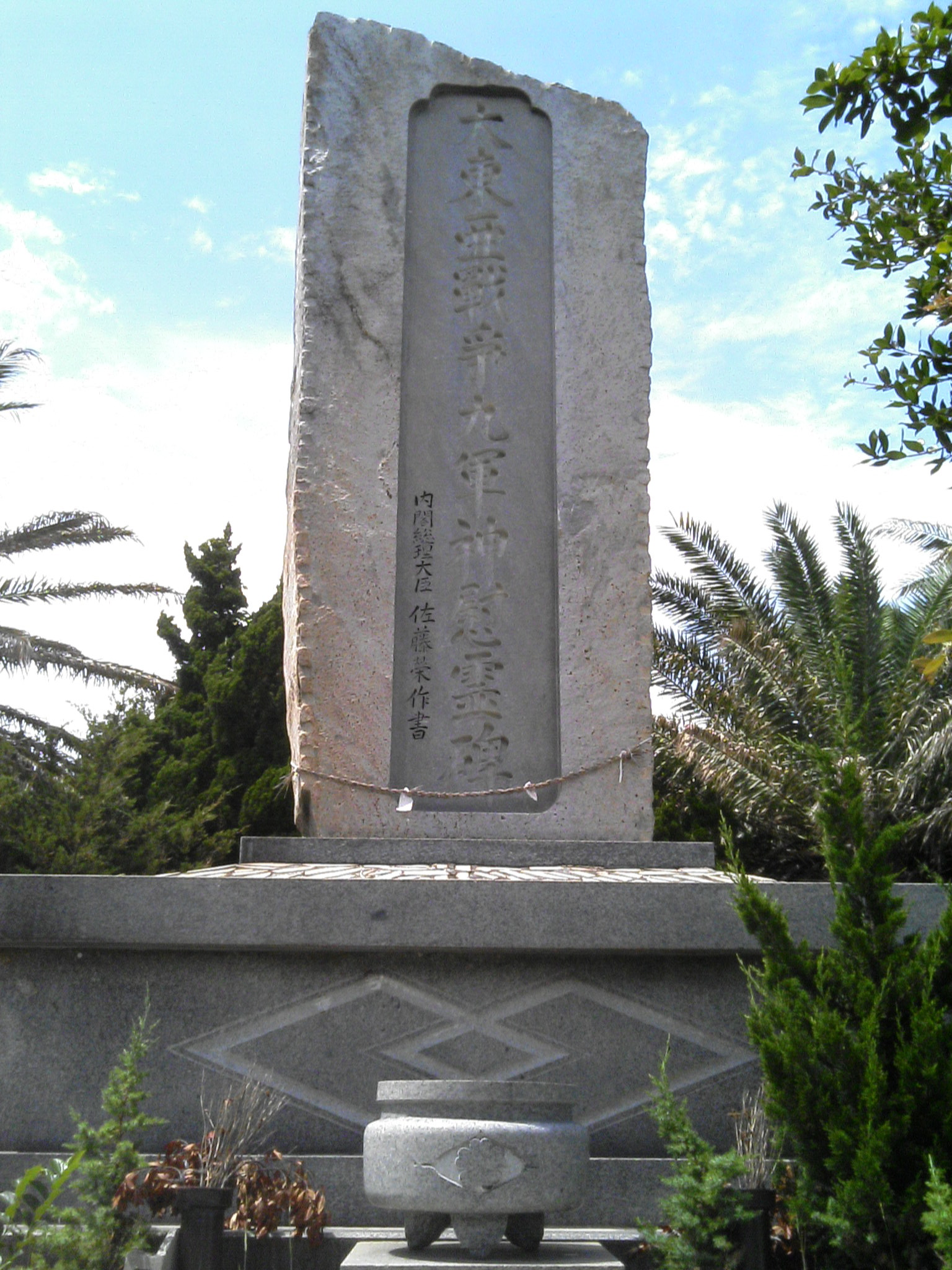
The Nine War Heroes monument in Suka Park

A decade after the Meiji Restoration, in March 1878 the Uwa District was divided into the current Kitauwa, Minamiuwa, Higashiuwa, and Nishiuwa districts (North-, South-, East-, and West-Uwa, respectively). Ikata was designated a village (村, mura) in 1889 with the establishment of the modern municipalities system, and other neighborhoods along the peninsula soon followed suit, many merging to reduce the number of independent settlements from 26 to 6.

More recently, Seto's Mitsukue Bay was used for submarine training operations by the Imperial Japanese Navy leading up to World War II, as the bay's shape is similar to that of Pearl Harbor. A monument named The Nine War Heroes (九軍神, Kyū gunshin) stands in Suka Park in Mitsukue as a memorial dedicated to the nine young men (ages 21–28) who were stationed in the Mitsukue area for these exercises. According to the plaque on the monument, the men were quite friendly with the locals, and stories are still told about them in the neighborhood to this day. The men died on December 8, 1941, during one of the initial attacks on Pearl Harbor.

In 1955 another round of mergers corresponding to the Great Shōwa Merger reduced the number of municipal entities to three.

In 1977 the Ikata Nuclear Power Plant began operation as the first nuclear power plant on the island of Shikoku.

On April 1, 2005, Ikata merged with the nearby towns of Misaki and Seto to create the new town of Ikata, which spans the Sadamisaki Peninsula.

The installation of many new windmills in 2006 and 2007 solicited a significant amount of noise complaints from nearby residents.

In March 2014, national attention turned to Ikata as the towns elections near. Many wondered if Ikata would approve the restart of its nuclear power generators.

=== Timeline ===
- March 1878 — Meiji reforms create the Nishiuwa District
- 1889 — Ikata is designated a village.
- March 31, 1955 — The villages of Ikata and Machimi merge, forming the old town of Ikata
- September 30, 1977 — Reactor No. 1 of the Ikata Nuclear Power Plant begins operation
- April 1, 2005 — The towns of Misaki and Seto were merged into Ikata to form the new and expanded town of Ikata

Mergers leading to modern-day Ikata
until April 1, 1889	April 1, 1889	1955–1956	April 1, 2005
Ikata (伊方浦)	Ikata (伊方村)	Ikata (伊方町)	Ikata (伊方町)
Kuchō (九町浦)	Machimi (町見村)	Ikata (伊方町)	Ikata (伊方町)
Futami (二見浦)	Machimi (町見村)	Ikata (伊方町)	Ikata (伊方町)
Ashinaru (足成浦)	Mitsukue (三机村)	Seto (瀬戸町)	Ikata (伊方町)
Shionashi (塩成浦)	Mitsukue (三机村)	Seto (瀬戸町)	Ikata (伊方町)
Mitsukue (三机浦)	Mitsukue (三机村)	Seto (瀬戸町)	Ikata (伊方町)
Ōe (大江浦)	Mitsukue (三机村)	Seto (瀬戸町)	Ikata (伊方町)
Shitsu (志津浦)	Mitsukue (三机村)	Seto (瀬戸町)	Ikata (伊方町)
Kojima (小島浦)	Mitsukue (三机村)	Seto (瀬戸町)	Ikata (伊方町)
Kawanohama (川之浜浦)	Yotsuhama (四ツ浜村)	Seto (瀬戸町)	Ikata (伊方町)
Ōku (大久浦)	Yotsuhama (四ツ浜村)	Seto (瀬戸町)	Ikata (伊方町)
Tabu (田部浦)	Yotsuhama (四ツ浜村)	Seto (瀬戸町)	Ikata (伊方町)
Kōzaki (神崎浦)	Yotsuhama (四ツ浜村)	Seto (瀬戸町)	Ikata (伊方町)
Kamagi (釜木浦)	Kanmatsuna (神松名村)	Misaki (三崎町)	Ikata (伊方町)
Hiraiso (平磯浦)	Kanmatsuna (神松名村)	Misaki (三崎町)	Ikata (伊方町)
Futanazu (二名津浦)	Kanmatsuna (神松名村)	Misaki (三崎町)	Ikata (伊方町)
Natori (名取浦)	Kanmatsuna (神松名村)	Misaki (三崎町)	Ikata (伊方町)
Myōjin (明神浦)	Kanmatsuna (神松名村)	Misaki (三崎町)	Ikata (伊方町)
Matsu (松浦)	Kanmatsuna (神松名村)	Misaki (三崎町)	Ikata (伊方町)
Yobokori (与侈浦)	Misaki (三崎村)	Misaki (三崎町)	Ikata (伊方町)
Kushi (串浦)	Misaki (三崎村)	Misaki (三崎町)	Ikata (伊方町)
Shōno (正野浦)	Misaki (三崎村)	Misaki (三崎町)	Ikata (伊方町)
Taka (高浦)	Misaki (三崎村)	Misaki (三崎町)	Ikata (伊方町)
Sada (佐田浦)	Misaki (三崎村)	Misaki (三崎町)	Ikata (伊方町)
Ōsada (大佐田浦)	Misaki (三崎村)	Misaki (三崎町)	Ikata (伊方町)
Ino (井野浦)	Misaki (三崎村)	Misaki (三崎町)	Ikata (伊方町)

== Government and politics ==
Ikata has a mayor-council form of government with a directly elected mayor and a unicameral city council of 13 members. Ikata together with Yawatahama, contributes two members to the Ehime Prefectural Assembly. In terms of national politics, Ikata is part of Ehime 3rd district of the lower house of the Diet of Japan. Prior to 2022, the town was part of Ehime 4th district.

Ikata experienced significant political turbulence leading up to and immediately following the April 1, 2005 merger with Seto and Misaki. To begin with, multiple potential merger plans were put forth, one of which was for all of the contiguous Nishiuwa District towns (Misaki, Seto, Old Ikata, and Honai) to merge. However, when Honai announced that it would merge with the nearby city of Yawatahama, polls indicated that Misaki residents still preferred to merge with Honai and Yawatahama, rather than Seto and Old Ikata, despite their being discontiguous (a Misaki-Honai-Yawatahama merger would make Misaki an exclave). Ultimately this was found to be impractical, and the Misaki-Seto-Ikata merger was approved with some grumbling over the naming of the new town. Once the merger was decided upon, suggestions for the new town's name were solicited from the residents. Despite the many other reasonable suggestions and the seeming unfairness toward Seto and Misaki, the "new" name was chosen to be "Ikata."

Following the merger a heated mayoral race was held, with 11 members of incumbent Kiyoyoshi Nakamoto's campaign arrested for electoral fraud. Challenger Yoshihisa Hatanaka ultimately won, only to be arrested in February 2006 for corruption relating to government construction contracts. He resigned soon thereafter. A second race was held in April 2006, with Kazuhiko Yamashita defeating rival Kiyohiko Takakado by only 90 votes. Voter turnout was 87.43%.

There has been and remains political resistance among some Ikata residents to the nuclear power plant.

The most recent mayoral election took place on April 13, 2014, which found incumbent Yamashita in seat for his third term as mayor. 85.33% of the total 9,190 eligible voters turning out to cast a ballot. Mr. Yamashita garnered a total of 3,266 of the electorate while a certain Mr. Yoshihisa Hatanaka (see above) came in second place with a total of 2,399 votes. A non-Ikata resident of the "People Who Don't Need Nukes" Party (原発いらない人々) managed to win slightly more than 1% of the electorate with 104 votes.

== Economy ==
Ikata's main industries are farming (largely citrus fruits such as mikans), fishing, and electrical power. Ikata produces a substantial fraction of Shikoku's electricity. There are two main power production methods currently in use.

=== Wind power ===
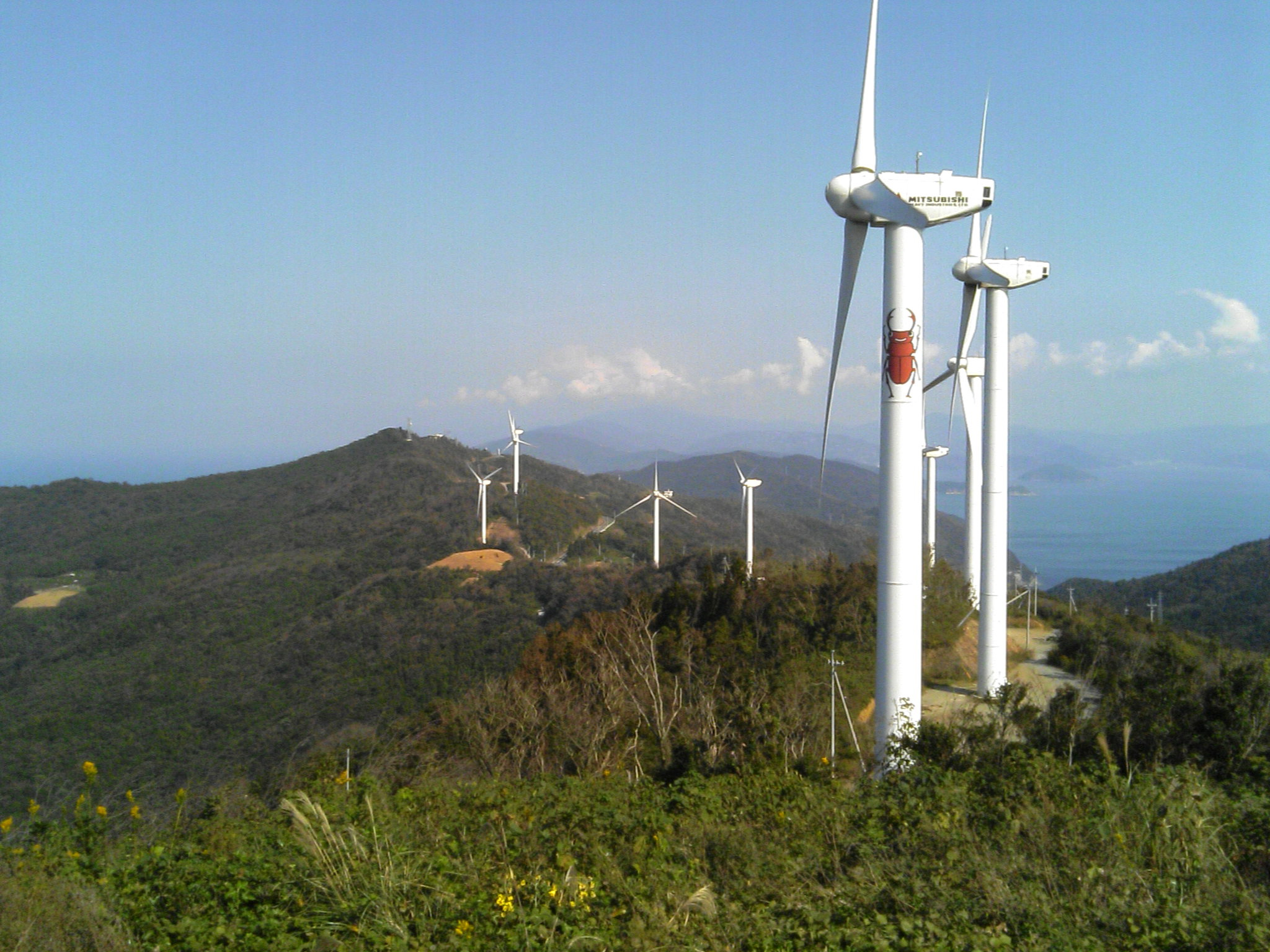
Windmills at the Seto Wind Hill Park

The former town of Seto erected eleven Mitsubishi MWT-1000 wind generators in January 2002. The Old Ikata installed two Vestas V52-850 kW generators in March 2005. Together they have an expected yearly energy output of 34,700 MWh.

Ikata is investing heavily in wind power infrastructure, with 45 additional towers currently under construction. The town plans to have a total of 60 generators within the next few years.

=== Nuclear power ===
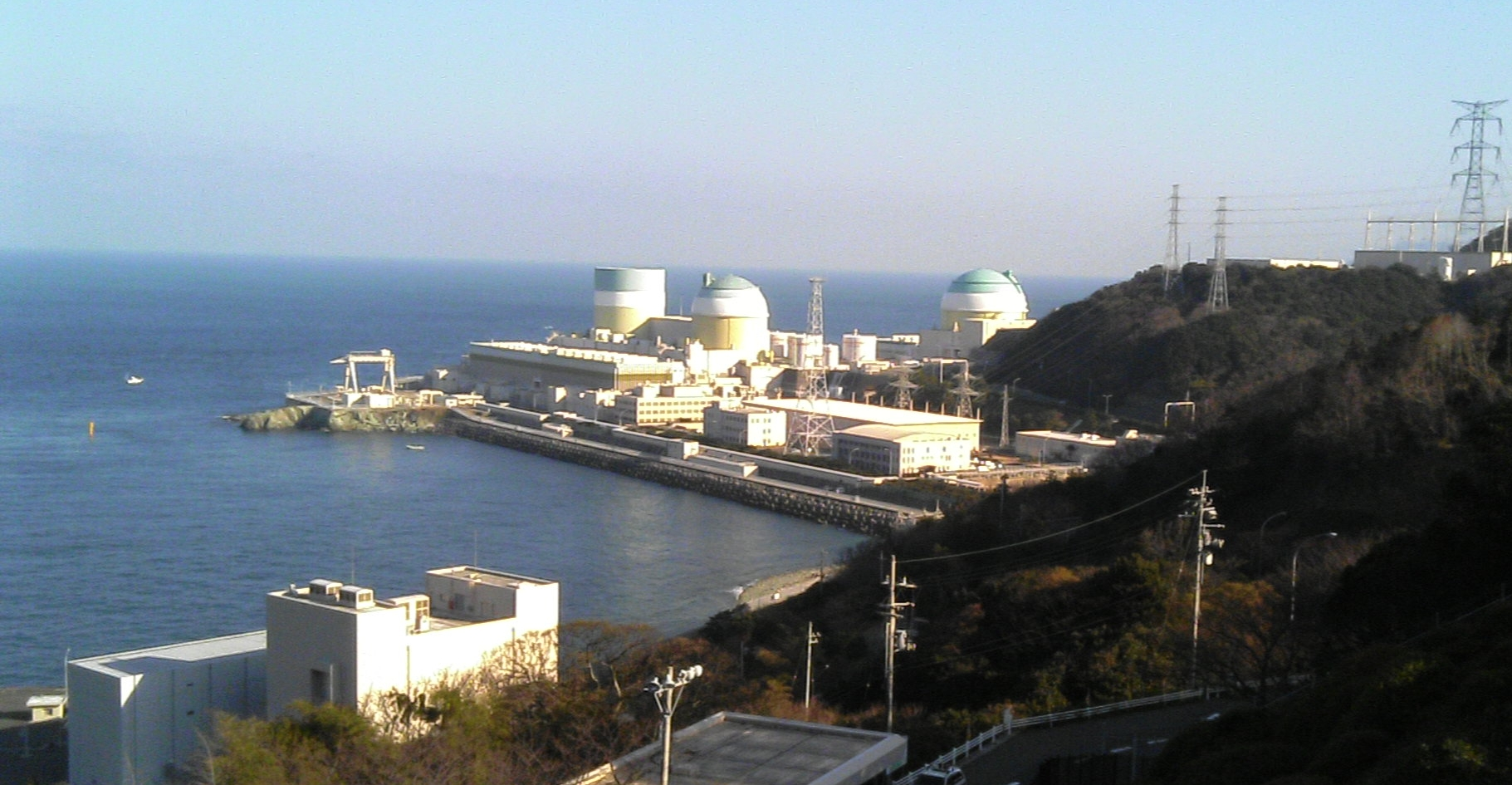
Ikata Nuclear Power Plant

Ikata is the site of Shikoku's only nuclear power plant. The Ikata Nuclear Power Plant has two Mitsubishi 538 MWe Pressurized Water Reactor units with the Two Reactor Coolant Loop design (similar to the original Westinghouse design at Prairie Island, Kewaunee, and Point Beach plants) and one Mitsubishi Pressurized Water Reactor unit with the Three Reactor Coolant Loop design (similar to the Westinghouse Surry, North Anna, and Robinson plants). Units 1 and 2 started up on September 30, 1977, and March 19, 1981, respectively. Unit 3 is a three loop PWR rated at 846 MWe that started up on December 15, 1994.

April 1, 2007, marked a milestone for the Ikata plant as it reached a total of 300 million kilowatt-hours of energy generated since beginning operations in 1977.

== Education ==
Ikata has six public elementary schools and three public middle schools operated by the city government. The city has one public high school operated by the Ehime Prefectural Board of Education.

== Transportation ==
=== Railways ===
Ikata has no passenger rail service. The closest station is the JR Shikoku Yawatahama Station on the Yosan Line.

=== Highways ===
==== Background ====
Due to Ikata's length and mountainous terrain, regular bus service did not reach the tip of the peninsula until the 1960s. Until then, the only public transportation available was local ferries that connected the bays of each neighborhood. In 1963, the original Japan National Route 197 was completed. It follows the coastline, and is thus extremely winding and narrow, with very little room for cars to pass. Traversing the peninsula by this route takes hours and can be quite nerve-wracking; this earned it the ire of the locals, who came up with a disparaging nickname that is a pun on the actual name: "the Don't-go-there Terrible Road" (イクナ酷道, i-ku-na kokudō; where i-ku-na is an alternate pronunciation of "197", literally meaning "don't go").

==== Modern day ====
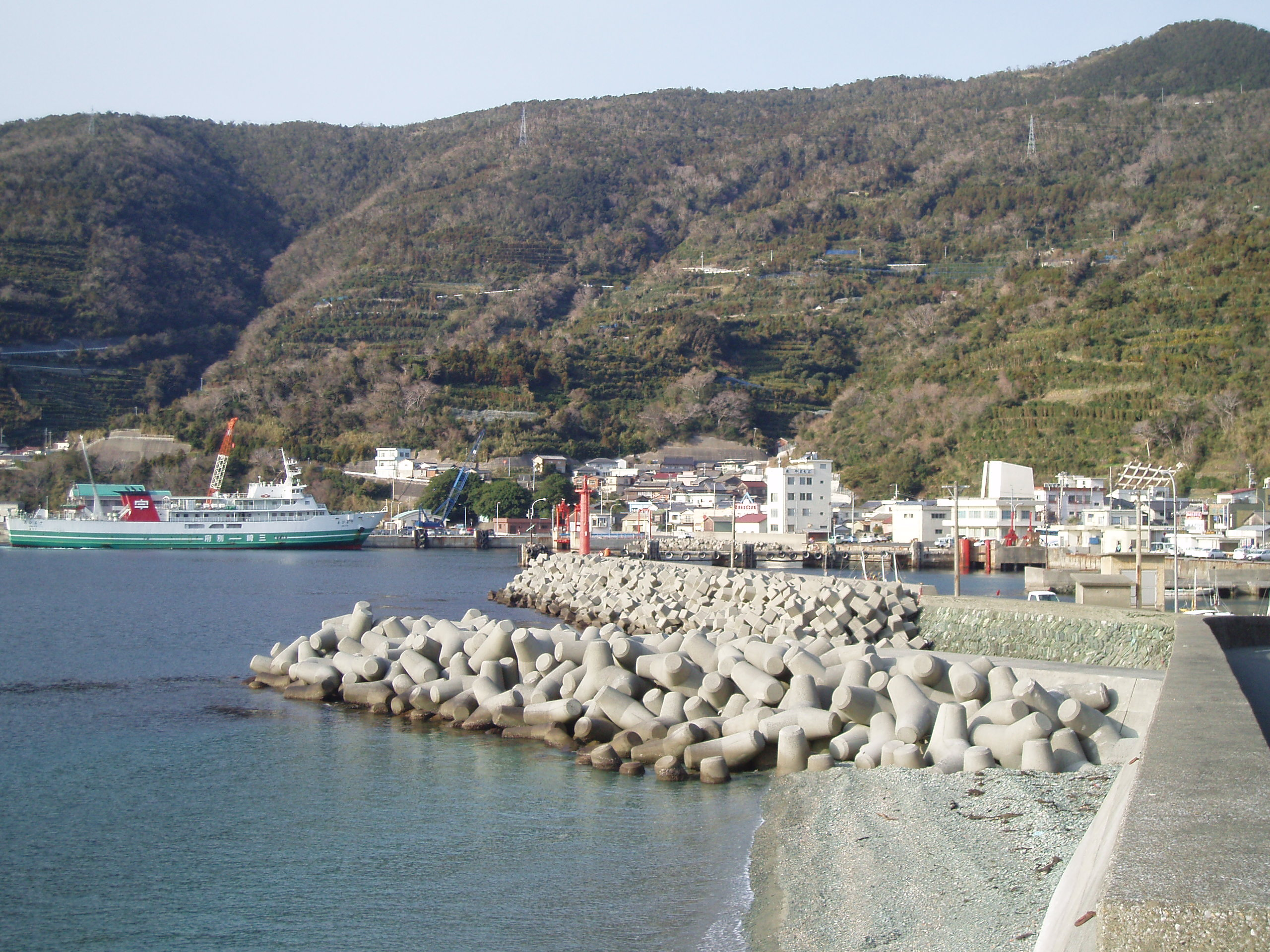
A ferry from Saganoseki pulls into Misaki Port

The Ikata leg of the new National Route 197 was completed in 1987 and is the heart of transportation in modern Ikata, affectionately nicknamed "Melody Line". This nickname later spawned a musical road portion of the road built to celebrate its anniversary that was completed and added in 2011, so the road could literally have a "melody". The road "plays" parts of two Japanese songs when certain sections of the road are driven over. Unlike the old roads, Melody Line boasts two full lanes and runs relatively straight down the peninsula. Seated high in the mountains, drivers can enjoy views of both the Pacific Ocean and Inland Sea. The route terminates at Misaki and continues over to Kyūshū by ferries that connect Misaki Port with Saganoseki (Ōita, Ōita) and Beppu, Ōita.

Melody Line is such an improvement over the old roads that it has become a significant Ehime sightseeing attraction in itself, with many tourists coming to see cherry blossoms in the spring. Together with the city of Iyo's seaside Route 378, Melody Line makes one of the prefecture's recommended sightseeing routes, and one of JTB's "100 Hidden Treasures of Japan" (日本の秘境100選, nihon no hikyō hyaku-sen).

Iyo Railway bus service runs up and down the peninsula, to and from Yawatahama, and offers express buses from Misaki to Matsuyama. However, commuter buses run infrequently and, due to the length of the peninsula and the scattered nature of the town's neighborhoods, bus travel remains more expensive and less convenient than in denser areas. Some tour buses also come across the strait from Kyūshū by ferry.

== International relations ==
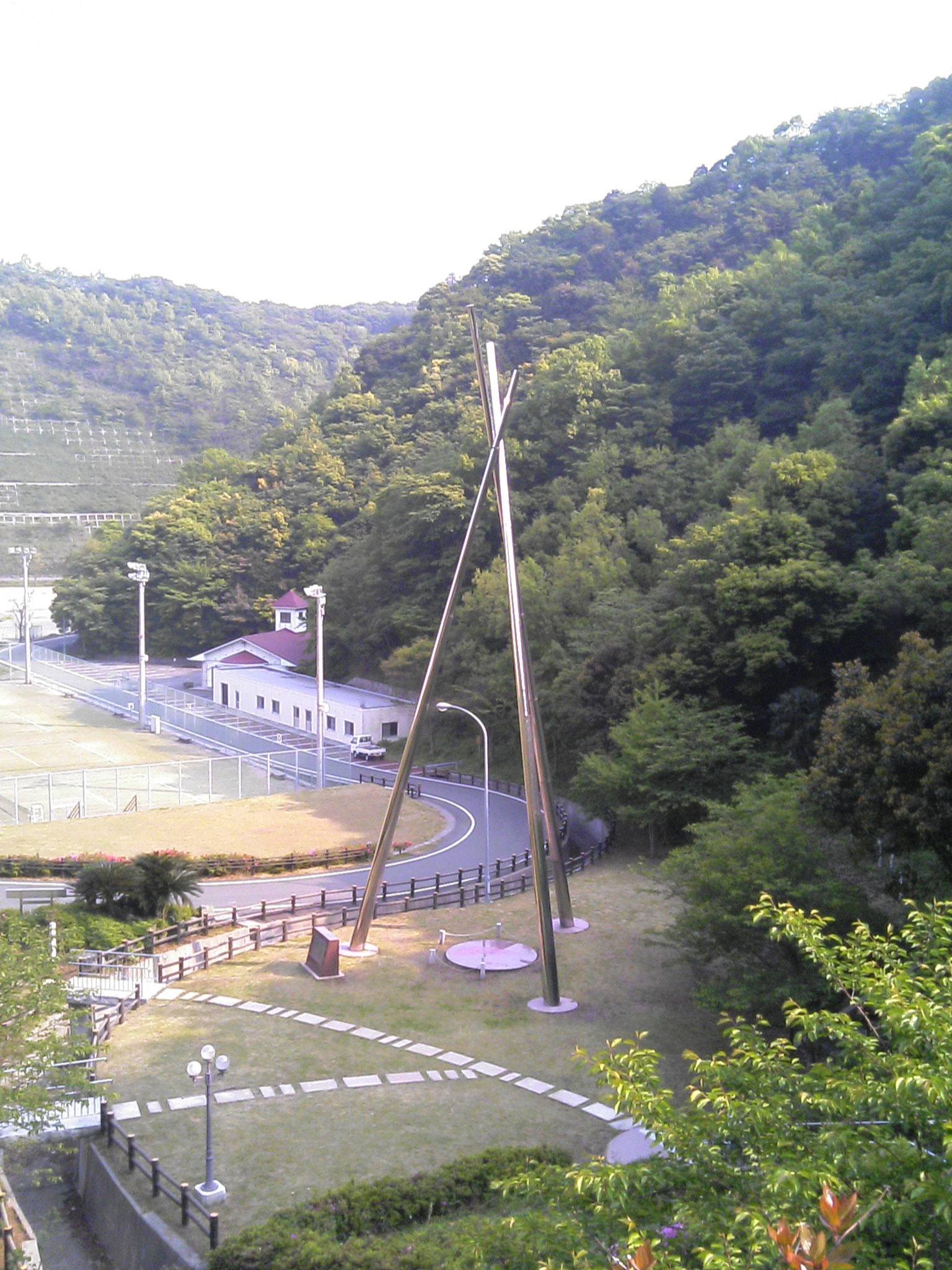
Tepee statue at Red Wing Park, representing the Red Wing Native Americans

Relations with Ikata's only overseas sister city, Red Wing, Minnesota, USA, originally began as an exchange of technical knowledge and skills between engineers at the Ikata Nuclear Power Plant and Red Wing's Prairie Island plant. The two towns became official sister cities in August 1995.

Since then, Ikata has put much effort into expanding the horizons of its residents through English language education via the JET Programme, and an annual international student exchange with Red Wing. Beginning in 1995, Ikata middle school students have traveled almost yearly to Red Wing for home stays of one to two weeks, and students from Red Wing likewise come to Ikata to learn about life in rural Japan.

Ikata's high school, Misaki High School, maintains an exchange program with Australia.

Ikata has two sister cities, both of which also have nuclear power plants:

- Tomari, Hokkaidō, Japan, since February 1998
- Red Wing, Minnesota, United States, since August 1995

== Local attractions ==
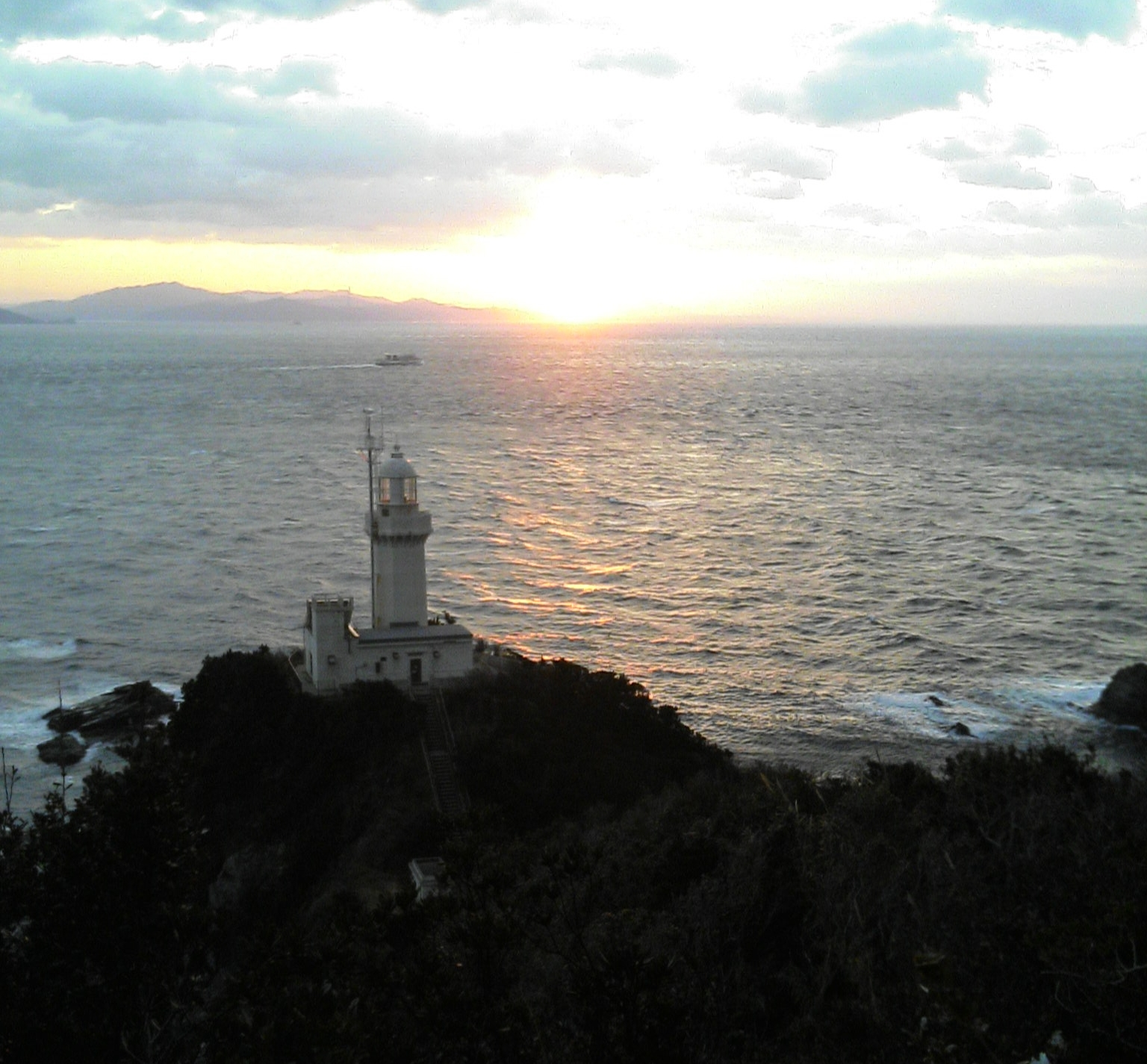
Sadamisaki Lighthouse at sunset

Sadamisaki Lighthouse
This lighthouse stands at the tip of the peninsula, overlooking the Hōyo Strait. On clear days you can see across to Kyūshū. Almost two kilometers of hiking trails and observation decks make up part of the Setonaikai National Park.

Seto Wind Hill Park
Located atop a mountain in the Gongen Mountain Park, Seto Wind Hill Park is located in the center of the peninsula and is free and open to the public. From it you can see dozens of Ikata's 29.5-meter, 4.3-ton windmills, and get up close to 11 of them. An actual wing of one of the windmills is on display in the park so visitors can get a better idea of the actual size. Benches and observation decks dot the park and Haikus about the windmills, submitted for Ikata's Windmill Festival, are on display year-round.

Public restrooms are available and powered by solar energy.

Ikata Visitors House
This hands-on science museum teaches all about nuclear power with beautiful interactive displays and fun activities for all ages. The building is connected to the Kirara-kan,

Kirara-kan
Opened in 1994, Kirara-kan houses an aquarium and sells souvenirs and local agricultural products. There are also several exhibits on display such as an Ikata Toji (Brew Master) exhibit and an International Relations exhibit with items on display from Ikata's sister city of Red Wing. Necklaces and pendants using pearls harvested from Uwa Sea to the south are also on sale. The second floor is a folk museum with scale-model fishing boat, and other tools and items of cultural significance to Ikata on display year-round. The third floor is a rest area offering a panorama view of the peninsula. Kirara-kan is connected to the Ikata Visitors House.

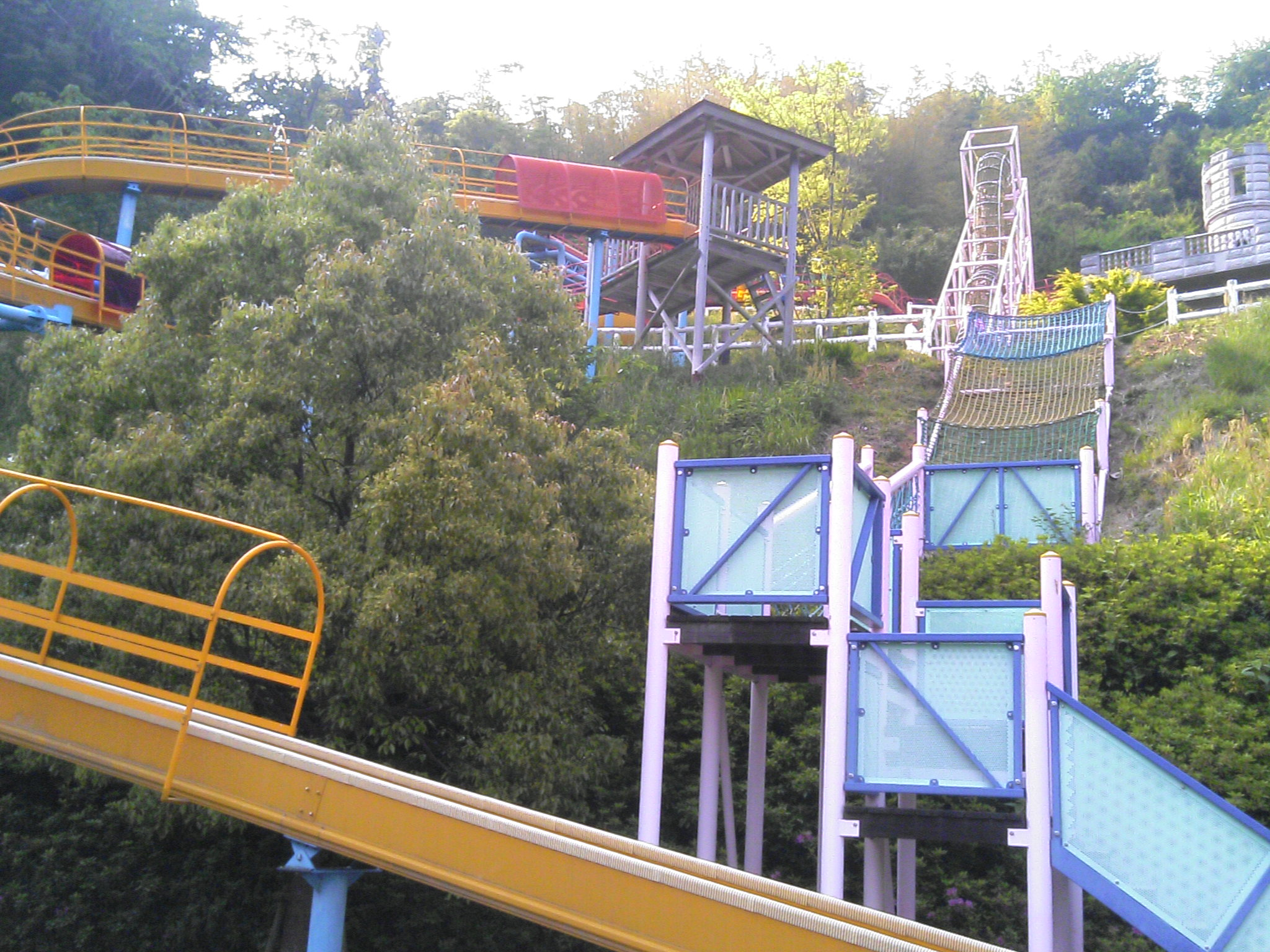
Adventure Hill in Red Wing Park

Red Wing Park
This park was constructed to commemorate the official joining of Ikata to her Sister City of Red Wing, Minnesota, after which it is named. Of note is the 21-meter stainless-steel monument located at the entrance of the park, a twin sister of the one in Bay Point Park, Red Wing. Beneath the monument lies a commemorative stone plaque bearing the signatures of each of the mayors at the time. It is home to Adventure Hill—a playground full of climbing nets, roller slides, and other children's play equipment. The park is free and open to the public. Tennis courts and a gravel field are available in the Community Grounds adjacent to the park. Reservations for use are made at the town office.

Kamegaike Onsen
A hot spring bathing facility and park opened to the public in August 2007. Hot spring water is sourced from a well at a depth of 1,500 meters. The bath is divided into two large bathing areas "Misaki" and "Toji" that are male or female only. Which area is designated as male and which is designated as female switches weekly. The Onsen is wheelchair-friendly and offers bathing options to fit every need. A local-goods shop and a restaurant are located in the onsen. Overnight stays are not available. Public transportation is available daily. A bus stop is located directly in front of the entrance. Parking is free. According to legend, a giant crab lives in the adjacent Kamegaike Pond.

=== Roadside stations ===
Ikata has two roadside stations along National Route 197. These are highway rest stops that offer refreshments, travel information, recreation facilities, and local goods for sale.

Ikata Kirara-kan
Features an aquarium, an exhibit chronicling Ikata's relations with its American sister city, Red Wing, Minnesota, and a small museum of Old Ikata historical artifacts. Attached to the Ikata Visitors House.

Seto Agriculture Park
Gelateria DanDan offers travelers unique ice cream and sorbet flavors like sake, kintarō potato, black sesame, and more. A Christmas tree decorated with mikan orange peels, a monument to Ikata explorer Hyōichi Kōno, and the Windmill Restaurant can also be found here.

== Culture ==
=== Etymology of name ===
The origin of the name Ikata is unclear and there are several competing theories.

- It may have come from iekata (家方) or iokata (庵方), meaning "a place with small houses or shacks".
- Ika can be found in the names of places surrounded by mountains or located in foothills; ta can mean "land". Ikata could therefore be "a place by the mountains".
- In the Ainu language, ika means "to pass through the mountains and cross the land". However, the Ainu are thought to have had little influence as far south as Shikoku.

=== Food ===
Ikata is known for its mikans and mikan juice. More than 20 different varieties of mikan are grown in Ikata. Old Ikata also has a very old sake brewing tradition that dates back to the Edo period, with several tōji brewmasters in the local area. There is even a museum dedicated to the Ikata Tōji.

The Seto area produces vegetables such as the bright-purple kintarō potato, and also catches baby sardines called chirimen (ちりめん). Misaki has a strong fishing tradition, producing many horse mackerel (鯵, aji) and mackerel (鯖, saba). Four Misaki Fishing Co-op products are part of the Ehime "With Love" (『愛』ある, "Ai" aru) brand: Horse mackerel, mackerel, largehead hairtail (太刀魚, tachiuo), and abalone (鮑, awabi).

One Ikata specialty cuisine is jakoten (じゃこ天), a tempura-fried patty of pressed white fish meat and vegetables. Other variations include jakokatsu (じゃこカツ), which is the same but fried and breaded like tonkatsu, and jako-croquette (じゃこコロッケ, jako-korokke) which is prepared like a croquette.

=== Language ===
Residents of Ikata speak the Iyo dialect of Japanese, which is similar in many respects to the Hiroshima dialect. One feature particular to the Nanyo (southern Ehime) region is the use of the sentence-final particle ga (が) as a replacement for no (の) in some contexts. For example, Nani shiteru no? (何してるの？ "What are you doing?" in standard Japanese) becomes Nani shiyoru ga? (何しよるが？) in Iyo dialect.

Ikata's largest town celebration in late summer, the Kinahaiya Ikata Festival, is another example of the Iyo dialect—kinahai ya (来なはいや) literally means "come on over" (kinasai yo 来なさいよ in standard Japanese).

=== Festivals and events ===
Ikata has a wide variety of festivals and attractions the year around.

February

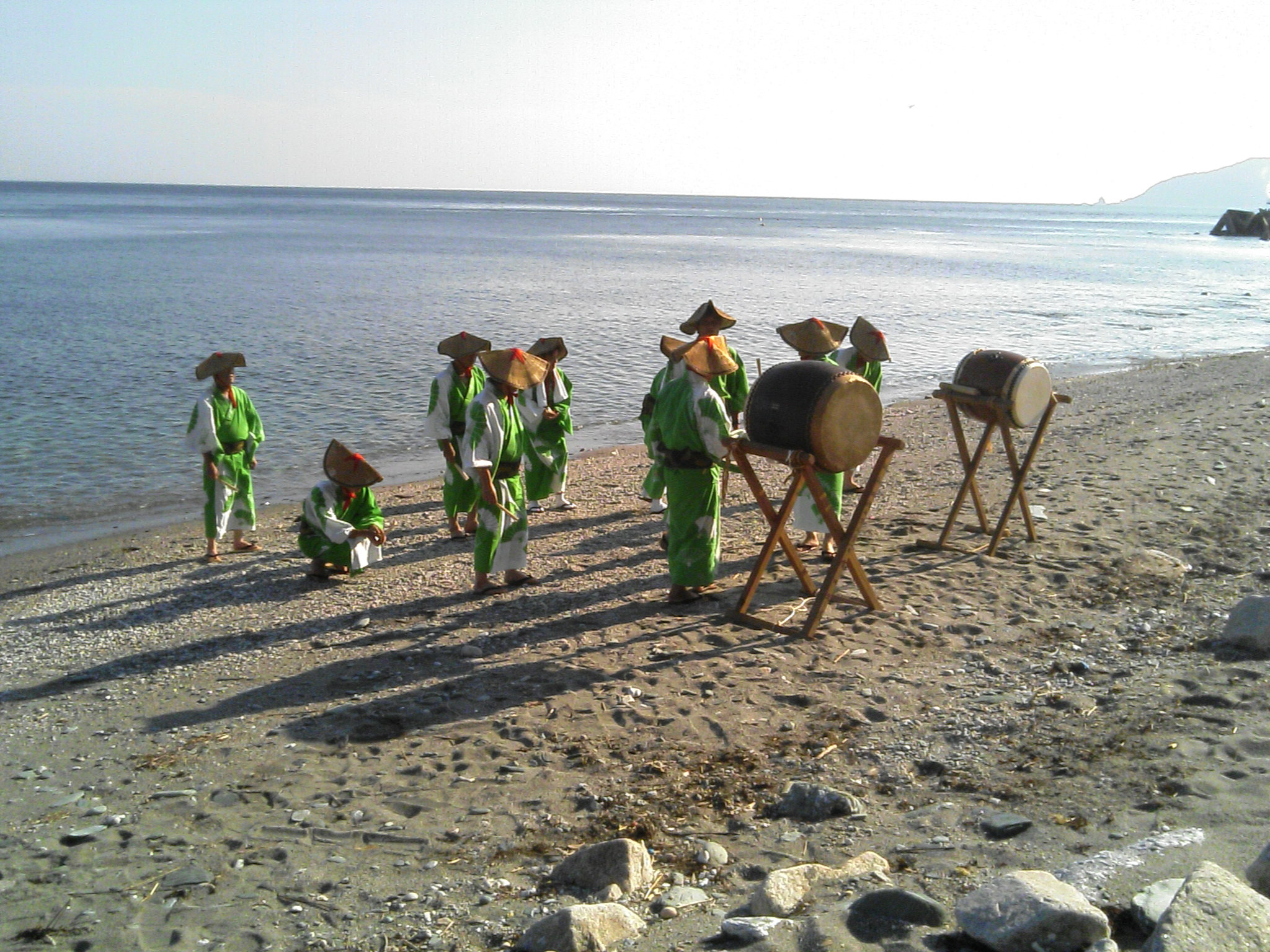
The Shan Shan Dance in Seto's Ōku neighborhood

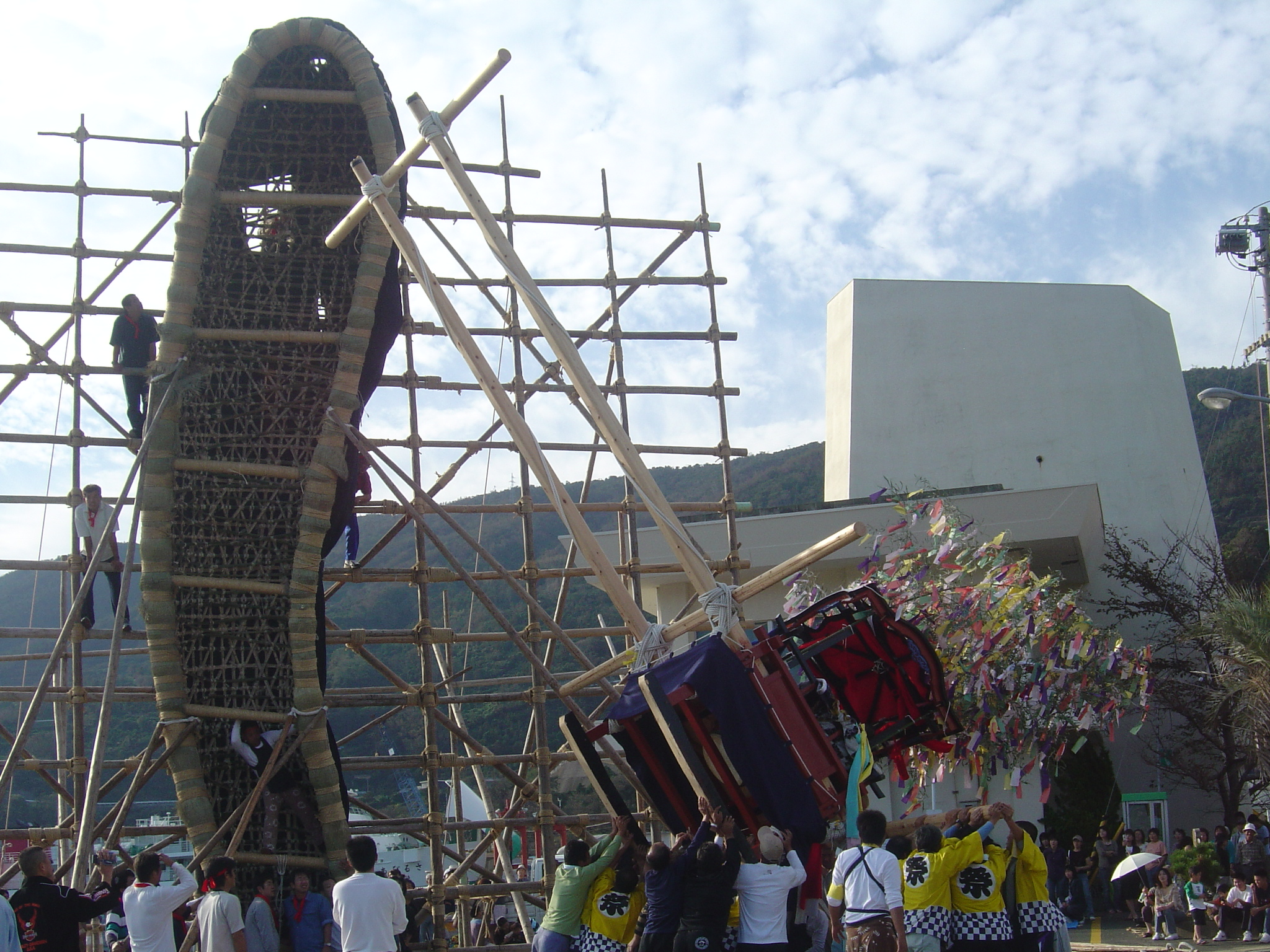
Ox Demon vs. Four Drums at the Misaki Autumn Festival

- Misaki Oise Dance (お伊勢踊り, Oise-odori)

Men and women of unlucky ages (厄年, yakudoshi; 25, 42, and 61 for men; 19, 33, and 37 for women) receive the blessings of local Buddhist priests in the form of a set of ceremonial dances. Afterwards, lucky decorative ornaments and free sake are offered to the crowd.

April

- Moo Moo Festival (もぉ〜モォ〜フェスティバル)

Held on Seto's Kōmo Highland atop Mt. Miharashi, the main event of this festival is an outdoor barbecue featuring locally-raised beef.

May

- Seto Gathering of the Sea (海のつどい, Umi no tsudoi)
- Misaki Fishing Festival (豊漁祭, Hōryōsai)

June

- Kirara Festival (きららまつり, Kirara-matsuri)

July

- Chirimen Festival (ちりめん祭り, Chirimen-matsuri)

August

- Kinahaiya Ikata Festival (きなはいや伊方まつり, Kinahaiya Ikata-matsuri)

This is Ikata's largest summer festival. Attractions include film and dance competitions, a taiko performance, children's sumo, and bare-handed fish catching, all concluded with a fireworks display in the evening.

- Seto Bridal Festival (花嫁まつり, Hanayome-matsuri)

Local single women put on a wedding dress fashion show, followed by fireworks in the evening. An outdoor barbecue and bare-handed fish wrangling are held in the nearby Suka Park.

September

- Ōku Shan Shan Dance (しゃんしゃん踊り, Shanshan-odori)

Every September a handful of local men and women gather along the Ōku beach to sing and perform this dance, with the purpose of placating the dead spirit of a woman who is said to have been washed ashore in Ōku long, long ago.

October

- Autumn Festival (秋祭り, aki-matsuri)

Each main region of Ikata holds its own separate Autumn Festival. Misaki's is perhaps the most spectacular of the three. The main attraction is the battle between the Ox Demon (牛鬼, ushioni) and the 4-meter tall Four Drums (四ツ太鼓, yotsudaiko), which are two ceremonial mikoshi floats carried by the young local men and women. Participants compete in repeatedly pulling the floats up along a giant 10-meter scaffold, then trying to drop theirs on top of the other.

3 important deities and demons make their appearance at most of Ikata's autumn festivals.

1. Ox Demon (牛鬼, Ushi Oni)

The tradition of the Ox Demon and festivals in Ikata dates back to the middle of Edo Japan (1800s). It is said that that Ox Demon and the voices of the men yelling おしょにん、エン、エン、エーン (Oshonin, en, en, e~n)keeps away the evil spirits from the Portable Shrines (神輿｜Mikoshi) as they make their way through the center of town.

2.Guardian Lion (唐獅子, Karashishi)

The Karashishi is most notably found in Japan at the entrance of Shinto Shrines and are used to either ward-off bad spirits or welcome good spirits. The Karashishi dance in Ikata involves two persons dancing under a single guardian lion costume to the beat of the drum of a young boy. Ikata's performers are especially well-known throughout most of the prefecture for their dedication to the dance.

3.Five Deer (五ツ鹿, Itsu Shika)

Although the origins of the five-deer dance are unknown, it is said that its traditions were brought over from Uwajima during the [Kanei] (寛永) period. (1624-1644) Especially popular at the time, many believe that it first made its appearance in Ikata at then Kawanagata-ura (川永田浦).

=== Folklore ===
==== The rats of Kuroshima ====
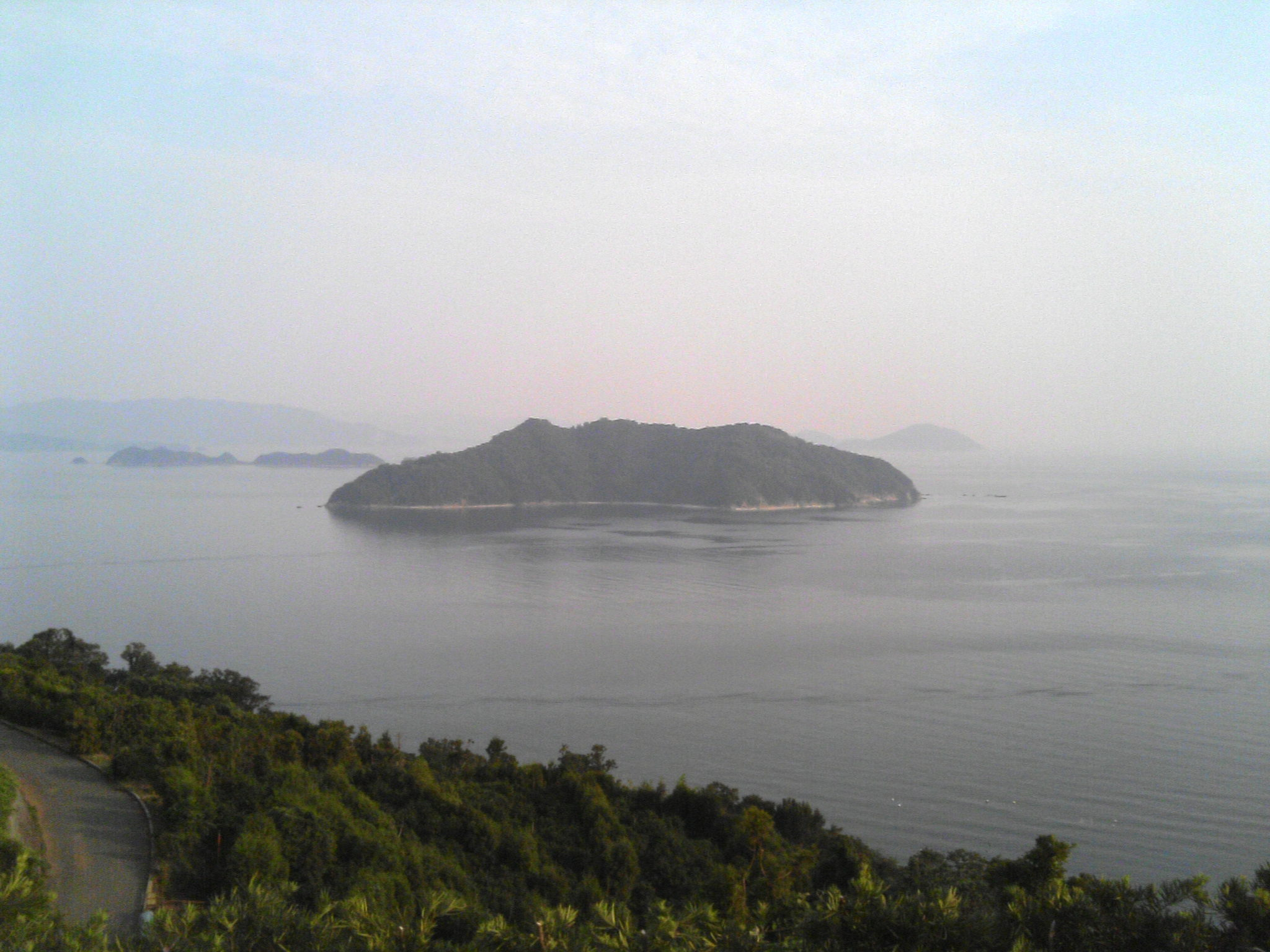
A view of Kuroshima from the Sadamisaki Peninsula

There are two small, uninhabited islands in the Uwa Sea near Yawatahama that belong to Ikata: Kuroshima and Karasushima. A legend written in the 13th century text A Collection of Things Heard, Ancient and Modern (古今著聞集, Kokon chomon shū) tells the following story:

In the Antei era (1227–1229), in the Yano area of the Iyo Province there was an island called Kuroshima. It was about one ri (4 km) from the nearest settlement. On the island lived a fisherman known as the Daiku of Katsurahazama (thought to be modern-day Honai). One night he was walking around looking for a good place to set his nets when he saw that the spots with fish appeared to glow in the night darkness. By every shore of the island the light glowed so brightly that he gleefully put out his nets, only to find that there were no fish at all. Instead what he pulled up was countless rats. After he pulled them ashore the rats fled, disappearing into the darkness. The fisherman was stunned. How strange this was! The island thus became full of rats, which ate all of the crops, and made the land infertile to this day. Though rats can of course be found on land, what a strange thing it is that they would be at the bottom of the sea!

==== The giant crab of Kamegaike ====
Local legend tells of a giant crab, eight tatami mats in size, that lives in the Kamegaike Pond in Old Ikata's Futami neighborhood.

Long ago a large crab lived in the Kuchō Pond. The crab grew bigger and bigger every day, until it reached eight tatami mats in size and was unable to swim comfortably in its pond. Looking for a new home, it went to the Kamegaike Pond in the next neighborhood over. In Kamegaike Pond there lived a kappa, which thought its home was too big, so it happily traded with the crab.

The crab thus found a new, larger home, and swam around happily. Unfortunately, its swimming caused the pond to overflow nearly every day, and the waves often capsized the nearby farmers' boats. The distraught farmers thus prayed to the gods to have the crab sealed at the bottom of the pond.

To this day, every year in the fall the local people hold a festival in which a ceremonial ox demon (牛鬼, ushioni) float is carried across the pond so as to keep the crab sealed in its depths.

=== In popular culture ===
The Ikata Power Plant was referenced in the 1995 movie Godzilla vs. Destoroyah. Godzilla attempts to attack the power plant, but meets resistance from the Self Defense Force's "Super-X III" weapon.

== Notable people from Ikata ==
- Adventurer Hyōichi Kōno successfully reached the North Pole in 1997. He died in 2001 while attempting to walk from the North Pole back to his birthplace, the former town of Seto.
- Shūji Nakamura, 2014 Nobel Prize in Physics winner, inventor of the blue LED, hails from the former town of Seto.

== Gallery ==
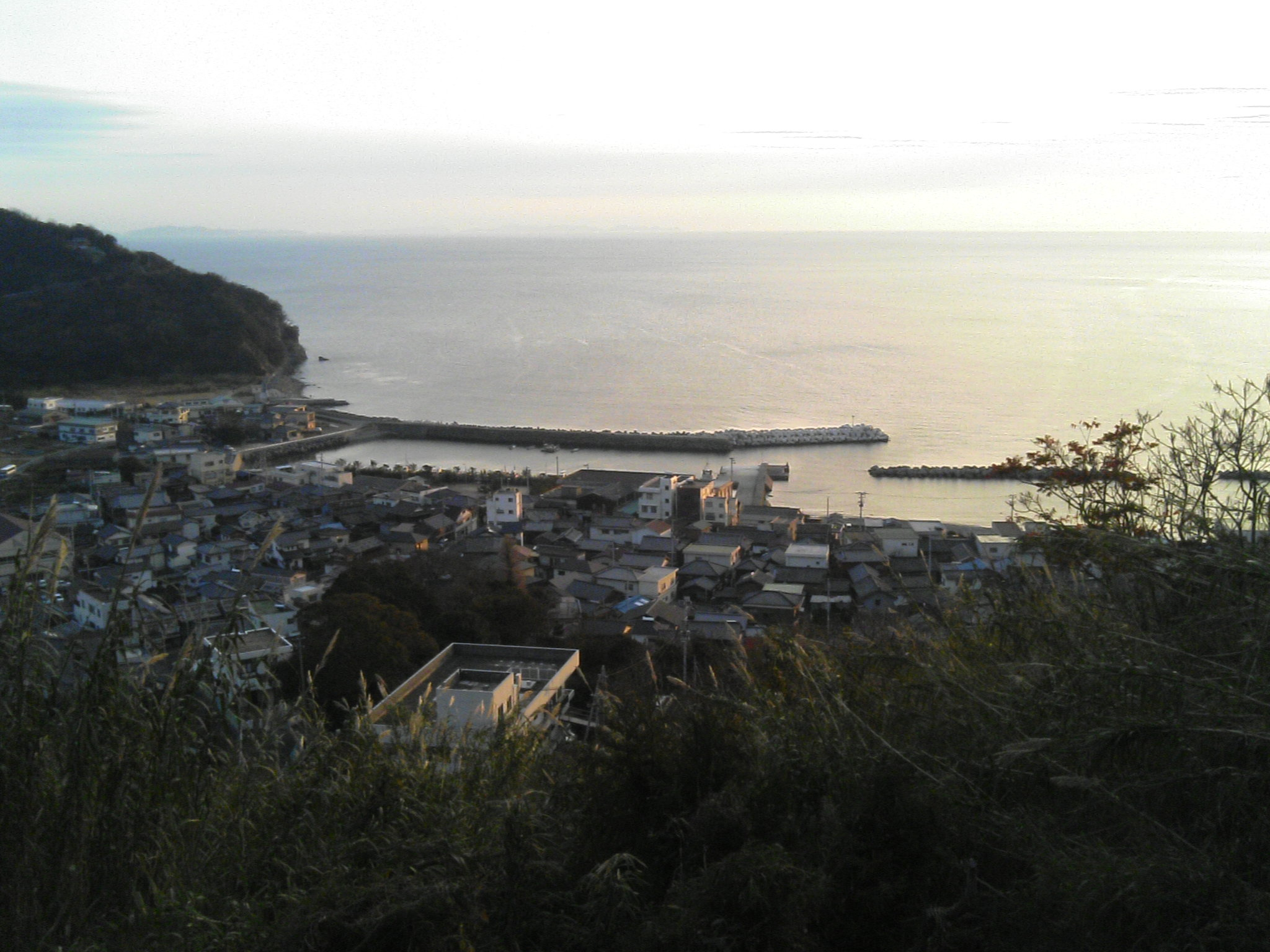
The Kuchō neighborhood at sunset

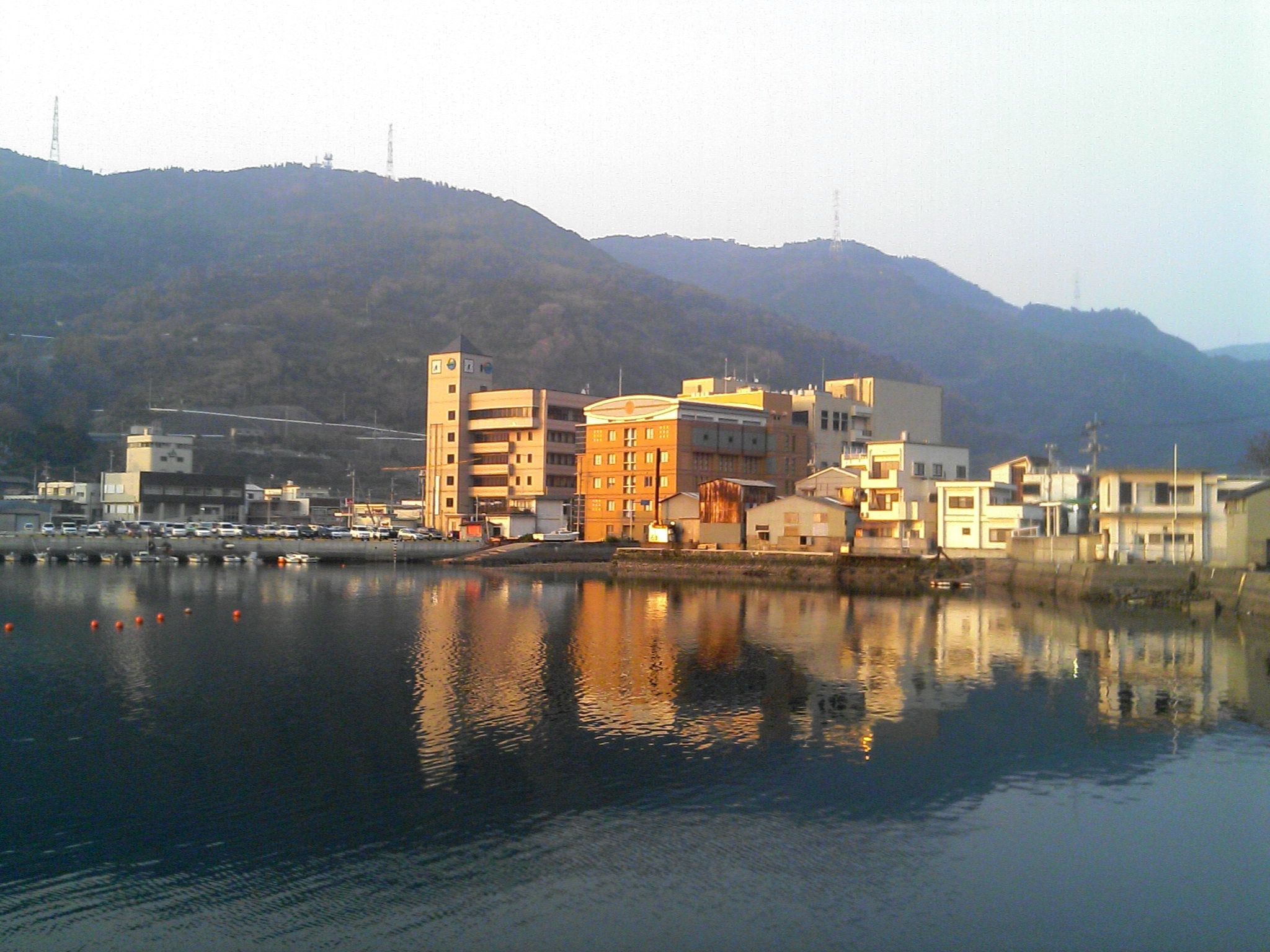
A view of the Minatoura Port

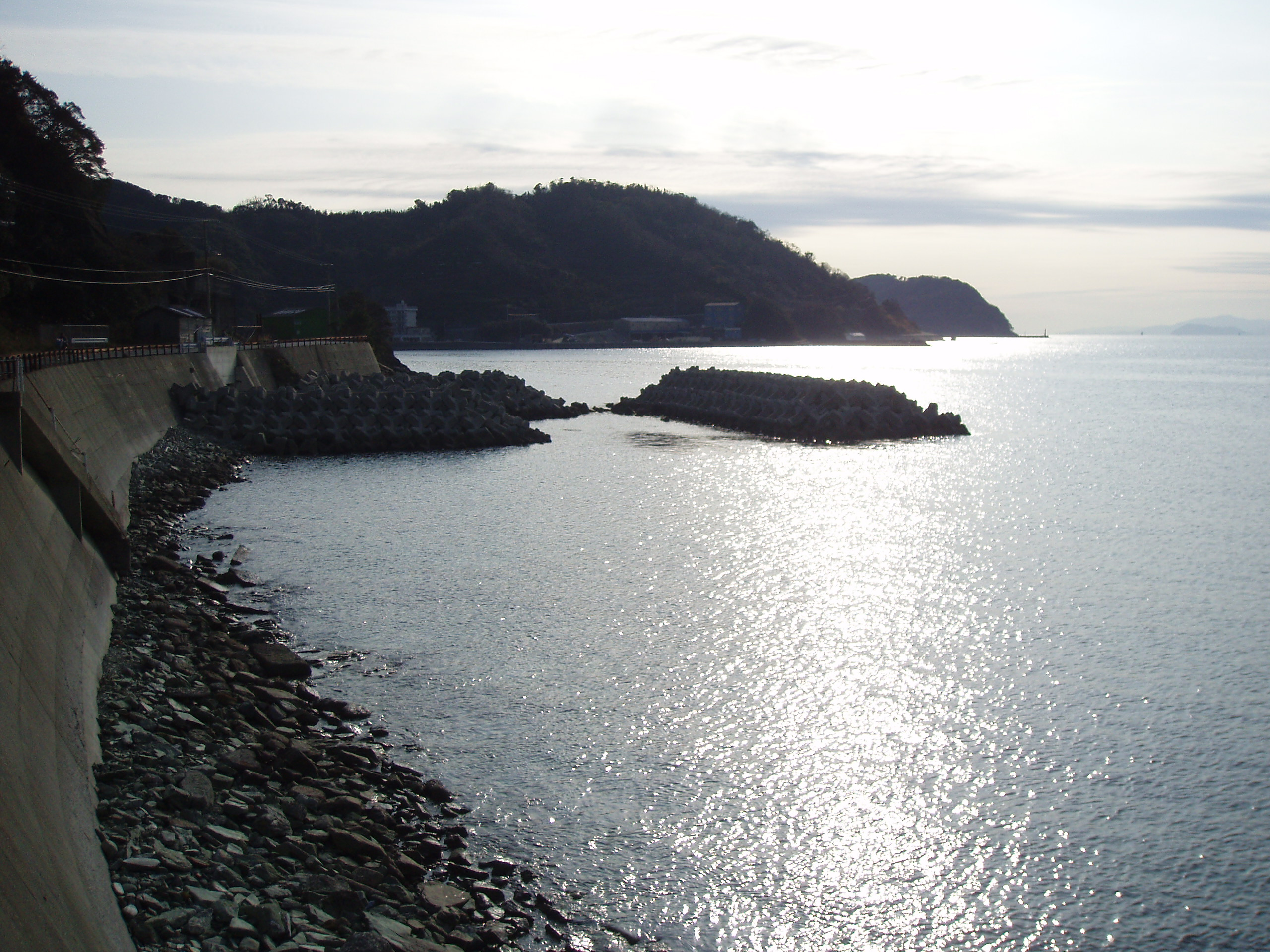
The shores of Misaki

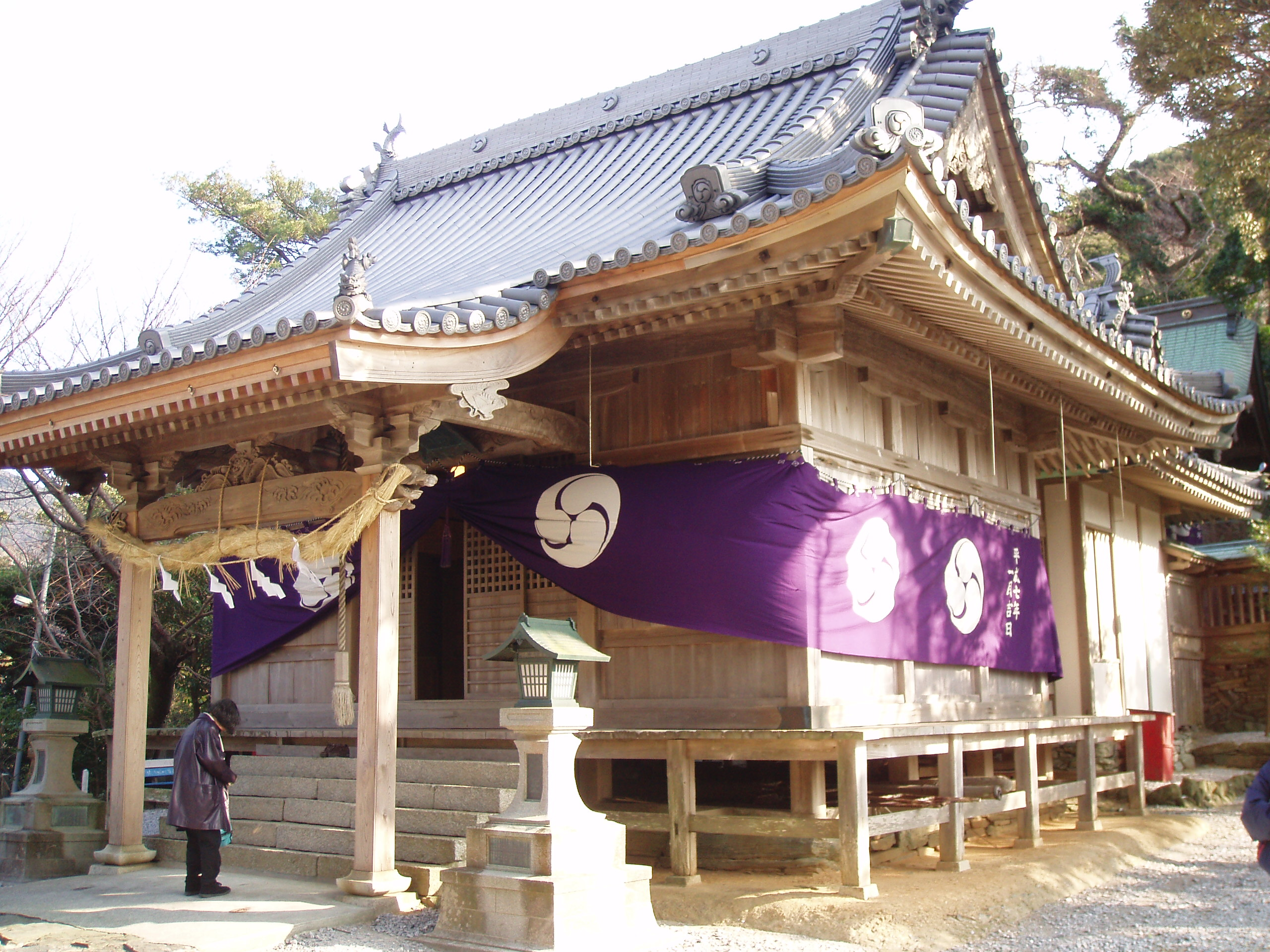
Misaki's Hachiman Shrine (八幡神社, Hachiman-jinja)

== See also ==
- Ikata Nuclear Power Plant
- Kuroshima, Ehime
- Sadamisaki Peninsula
- Seto Wind Farm
