= Seto, Ehime =

Dissolved municipality in Ehime prefecture, Japan

Seto (瀬戸町, Seto-chō) was a town located in Nishiuwa District, Ehime Prefecture, Japan.

As of 2003, the town had an estimated population of 2,696 and a density of 84.01 persons per km^{2}. The total area was 32.09 km^{2}.

On April 1, 2005, Seto, along with the town of Misaki (also from Nishiuwa District), was merged into the expanded town of Ikata.

== Climate ==
Climate data for Seto, Ehime (1997−2020 normals, extremes 1997−present)
Month	Jan	Feb	Mar	Apr	May	Jun	Jul	Aug	Sep	Oct	Nov	Dec	Year
Record high °C (°F)	18.6 (65.5)	21.1 (70.0)	22.0 (71.6)	26.6 (79.9)	31.0 (87.8)	31.9 (89.4)	33.2 (91.8)	34.4 (93.9)	33.9 (93.0)	30.7 (87.3)	26.2 (79.2)	20.8 (69.4)	34.4 (93.9)
Mean daily maximum °C (°F)	8.8 (47.8)	9.7 (49.5)	12.7 (54.9)	17.4 (63.3)	21.5 (70.7)	24.1 (75.4)	27.9 (82.2)	29.6 (85.3)	26.3 (79.3)	21.6 (70.9)	16.7 (62.1)	11.5 (52.7)	19.0 (66.2)
Daily mean °C (°F)	6.7 (44.1)	7.2 (45.0)	9.7 (49.5)	13.9 (57.0)	18.0 (64.4)	21.0 (69.8)	24.8 (76.6)	26.2 (79.2)	23.4 (74.1)	19.2 (66.6)	14.4 (57.9)	9.2 (48.6)	16.1 (61.1)
Mean daily minimum °C (°F)	4.6 (40.3)	4.9 (40.8)	7.0 (44.6)	11.0 (51.8)	15.1 (59.2)	18.7 (65.7)	22.7 (72.9)	24.0 (75.2)	21.4 (70.5)	17.2 (63.0)	12.3 (54.1)	7.1 (44.8)	13.8 (56.9)
Record low °C (°F)	−4.8 (23.4)	−3.7 (25.3)	−1.8 (28.8)	4.7 (40.5)	8.9 (48.0)	14.0 (57.2)	17.5 (63.5)	18.6 (65.5)	14.3 (57.7)	8.7 (47.7)	2.8 (37.0)	−3.3 (26.1)	−4.8 (23.4)
Average precipitation mm (inches)	65.1 (2.56)	75.1 (2.96)	110.5 (4.35)	118.2 (4.65)	155.8 (6.13)	285.7 (11.25)	218.7 (8.61)	104.9 (4.13)	193.9 (7.63)	138.6 (5.46)	85.8 (3.38)	74.4 (2.93)	1,627.7 (64.08)
Average precipitation days (≥ 1.0 mm)	8.3	8.6	9.8	9.7	8.9	12.5	10.0	6.7	9.9	7.4	7.3	8.1	107.2
Mean monthly sunshine hours	122.7	138.2	186.8	202.0	213.6	150.5	195.2	238.4	178.0	171.0	140.0	117.3	2,041.6
Source: JMA
