= Misaki, Ehime =

Dissolved municipality in Ehime prefecture, Japan

Misaki (三崎町, Misaki-chō) was a town located in Nishiuwa District, Ehime Prefecture, Japan.

As of 2003, the town had an estimated population of 3,863 and a density of 114.90 persons per km^{2}. The total area was 33.62 km^{2}.

On April 1, 2005, Misaki, along with the town of Seto (also from Nishiuwa District), was merged into the expanded town of Ikata.
