= Hyōichi Kōno =

Japanese adventurer (1958–2001)

Hyōichi Kōno (河野 兵市, Kōno Hyōichi; April 12, 1958 – May 17, 2001) was a Japanese adventurer, best known for circling Japan on bicycle and traveling to the North Pole. He was born in the town of Ikata, Ehime, Japan.

Kōno died in 2001 while attempting to walk from the North Pole back to his hometown. Kono went missing in the Canadian Arctic, and was found in the Arctic Ocean.

A memorial display entitled "Reaching Home" was erected at the Seto Agriculture Park in Ikata to honor him. It includes a signpost noting the names, dates, and distances of locations he traveled to. It reads as follows:

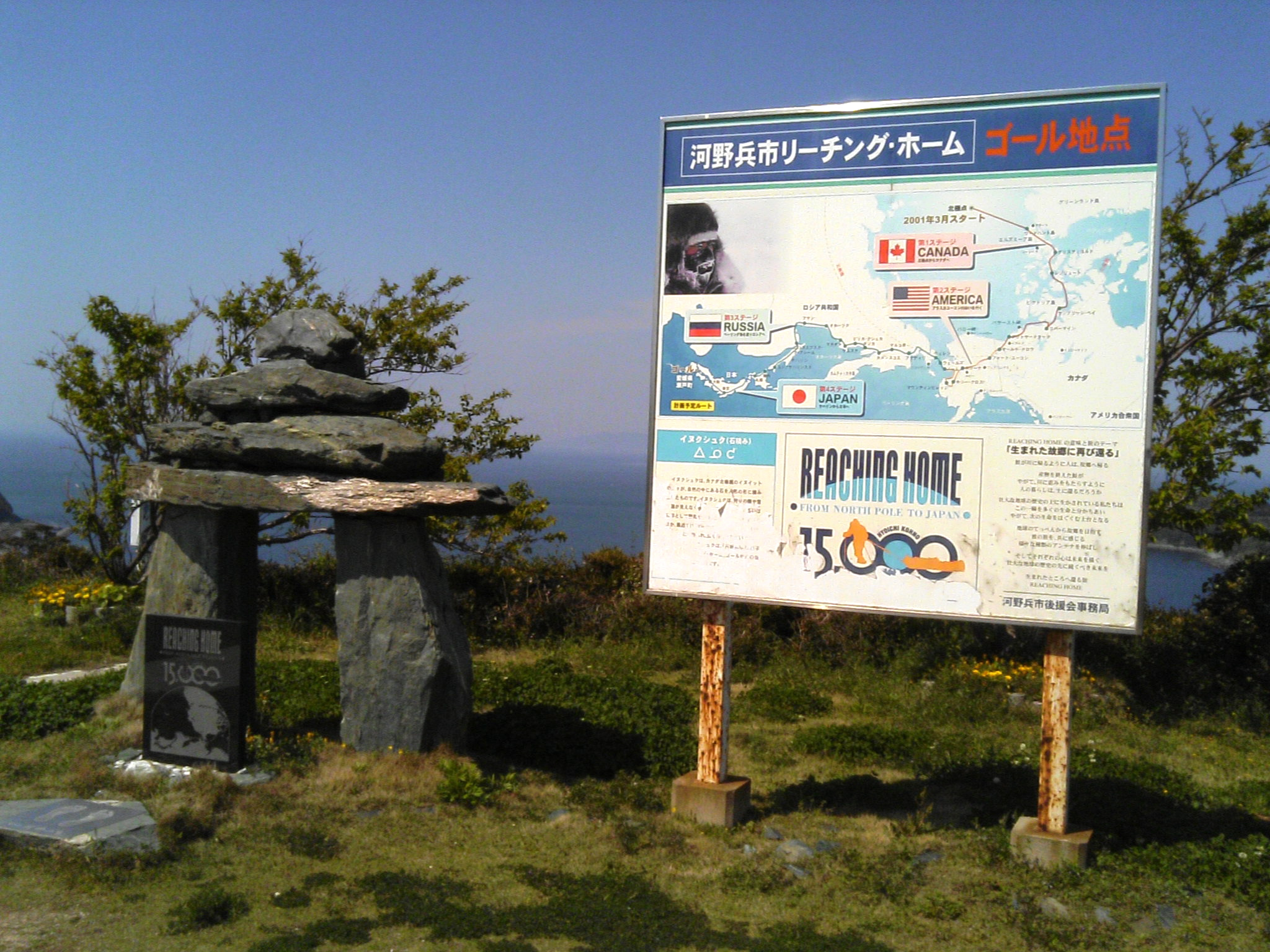
The "Reaching Home" memorial at the Seto Agriculture Park, Ikata, Ehime

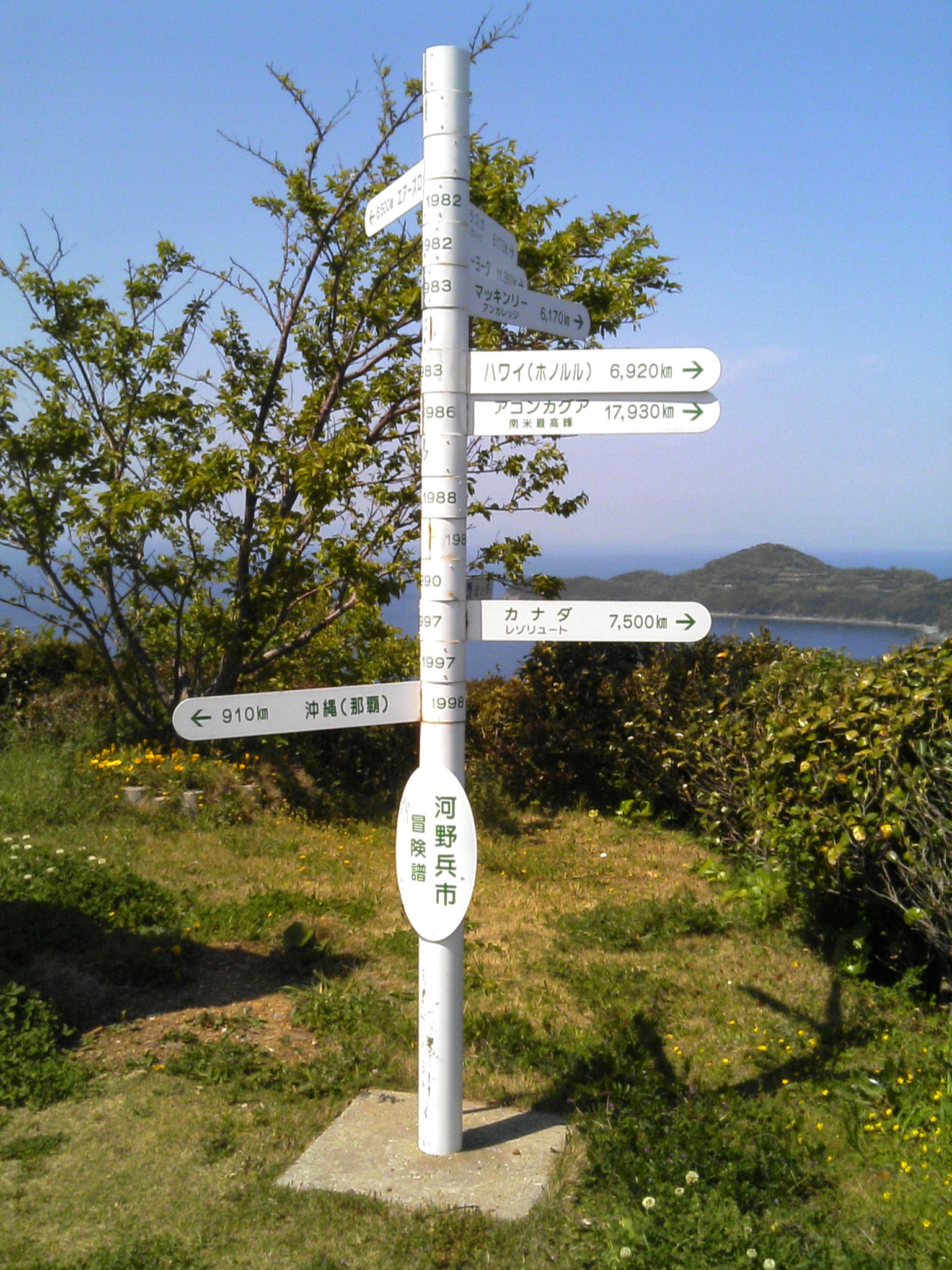
A signpost detailing Hyōichi Kōno's various travels.

Date	Location	Distance (km)
1981	Ayers Rock	6,500
1982	Anchorage, Alaska	6,170
1982	New York City	11,360
1983	Mount McKinley, Alaska	6,170
1983	(arrow missing)	
1983	Honolulu, Hawaii	6,920
1986	Aconcagua, the highest peak in South America	17,930
1987	(arrow missing)	
1988	(arrow missing)	
1989	(arrow missing)	
1990	(arrow missing)	
1997	Resolute, Canada	7,500
1997	North Pole	
1998	Naha, Okinawa	
