= Ikata Nuclear Power Plant =

Nuclear power plant in Japan

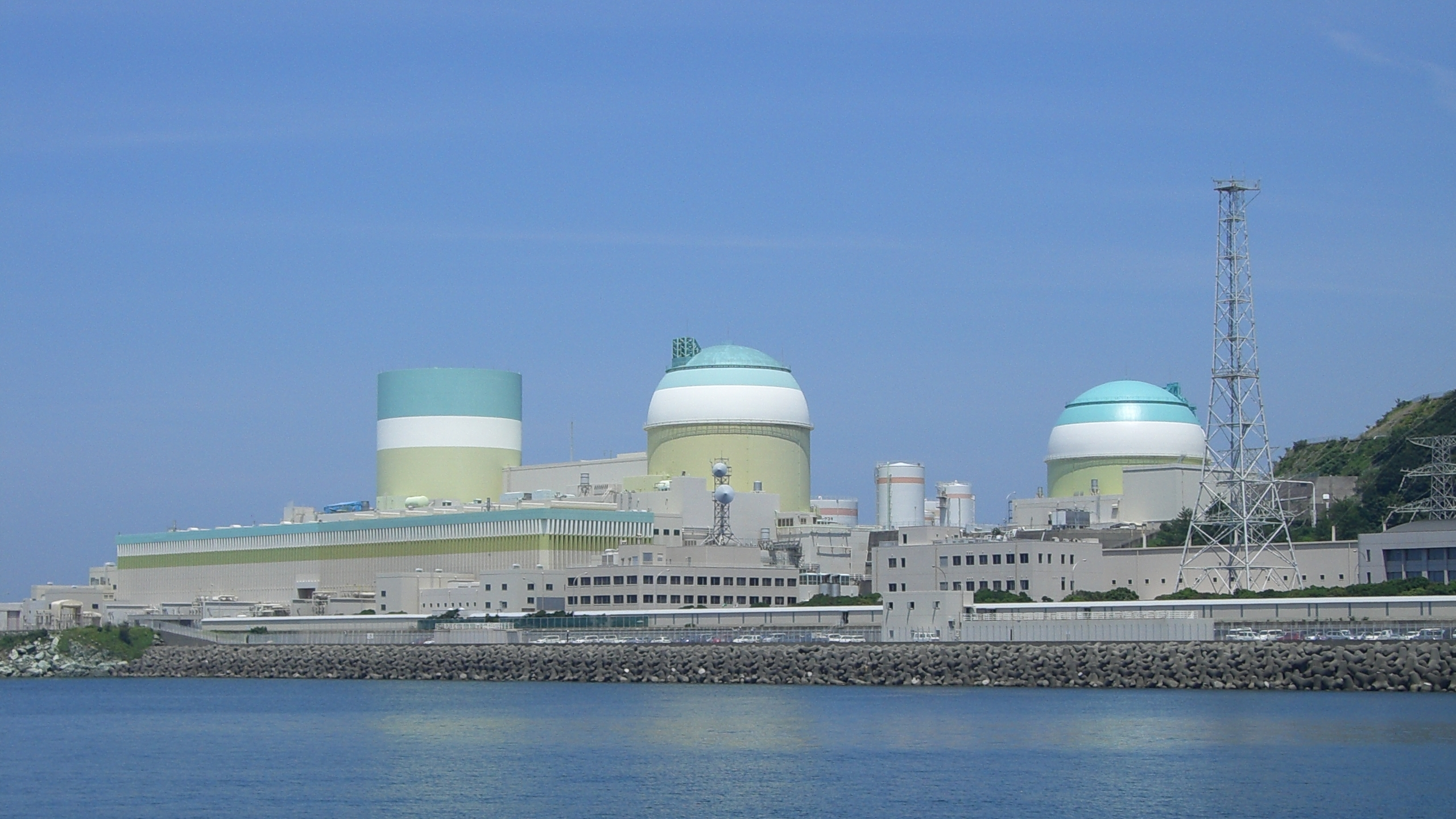
- The Ikata NPP, August 2006
- Country: Japan
- Coordinates: 33°29′27″N 132°18′41″E
- Status: Operational
- Construction began: September 1, 1973
- Commission date: September 30, 1977
- Operator: Shikoku Electric Power Company

Nuclear power station
- Reactor type: PWR
- Cooling source: Iyo-nada Sea

Power generation
- Units operational: 1 x 566 MW; 1 x 890 MW
- Units decommissioned: 1 x 566 MW
- Nameplate capacity: 1,456 MW
- Capacity factor: 4.73%
- Annual net output: 603.4 GW·h

External links
- Website: www.yonden.co.jp/energy/atom/ikata/
- Commons: Related media on Commons

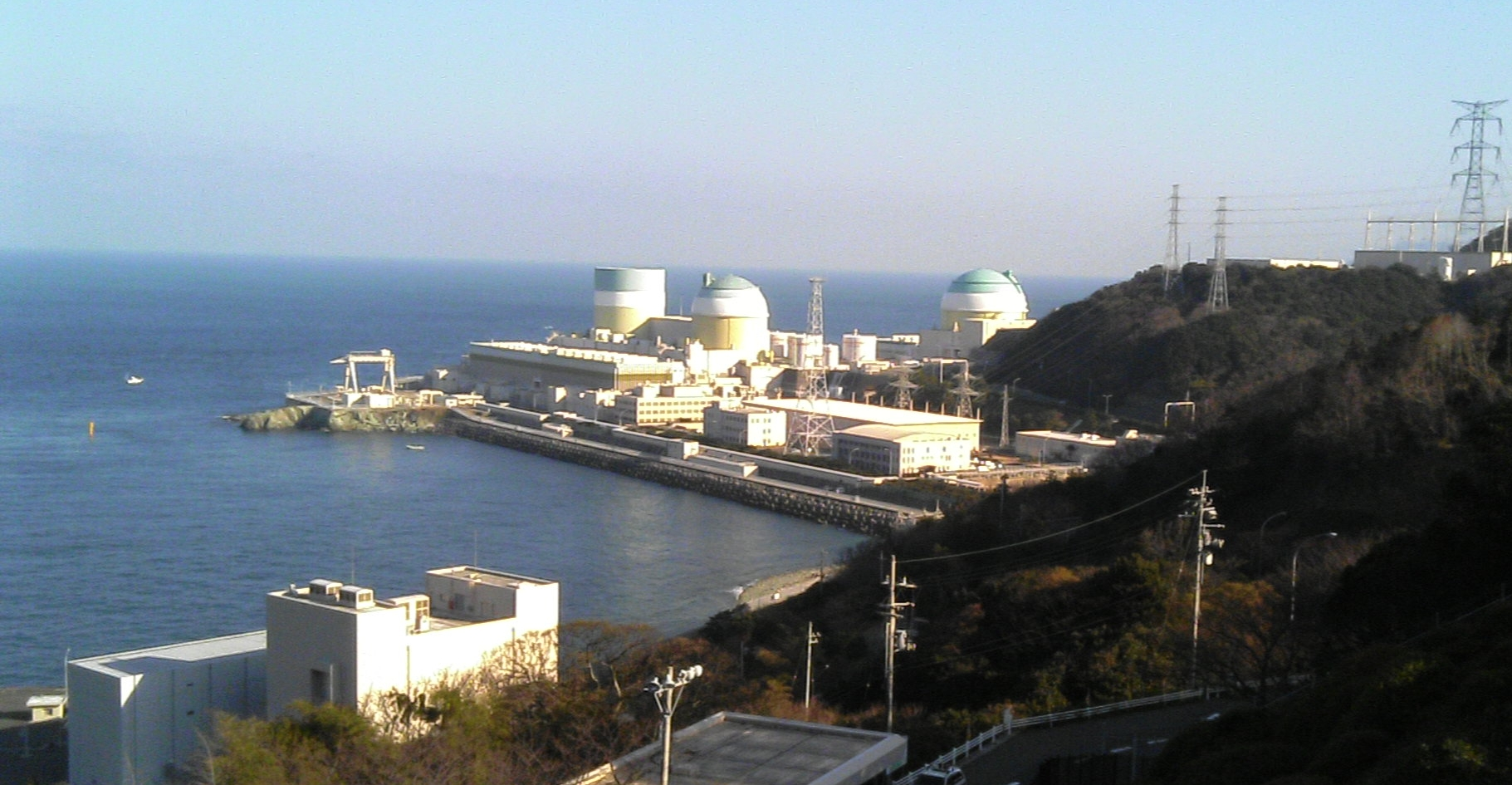
Another view of the plant

The Ikata Nuclear Power Plant (伊方発電所, Ikata hatsudensho; Ikata NPP) is a nuclear power plant in the town of Ikata in the Nishiuwa District of Ehime Prefecture, Japan. It is the only nuclear plant on the island of Shikoku. It is owned and operated by the Shikoku Electric Power Company. The plant was shut down along with all other nuclear plants in Japan following the Fukushima Daiichi nuclear disaster. Unit 3 was reactivated using plutonium-uranium mixed oxide fuel on 12 August 2016 and began providing electricity to the grid three days later.

On 13 December 2017, the Hiroshima High Court issued a temporary injunction to halt the operation of the Ikata 3 nuclear reactor until September 2018. The injunction was revoked in March 2021 and Ikata 3 was restarted in December 2021.

The plant is on a site with an area of 86 hectares (210 acres); 47% of the plant site is green, in comparison the non-nuclear plants Shikoku Electric operates are 13.8, 20.1, 21.2 and 45.5%.

== Reactors on site ==
Unit	Reactor type	Capacity	First criticality	Commissioned	Type	Comments
Ikata - 1	PWR	566 MW	February 17, 1977	September 30, 1977	Mitsubishi 2-loop plant	To be decommissioned
Ikata - 2	PWR	566 MW	August 19, 1981	March 19, 1982	Mitsubishi 2-loop plant	To be decommissioned
Ikata - 3	PWR	890 MW	March 29, 1994	December 15, 1994	Mitsubishi/Westinghouse 3-loop plant	In operation

== Important events ==
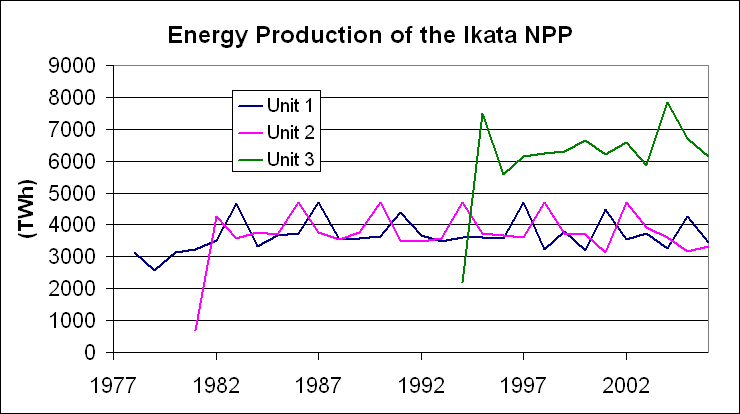
Energy production by unit of the site, showing fairly consistent performance (disregarding graph scale, which should be GWh instead of TWh)

=== Accidents ===
On 3 March 2004, there was a coolant leak in Unit 3.

=== Technical achievements ===
On 13 August 2003, the maximum burnup for spent fuel was changed from 48,000 MWd/ton to 55,000 MWd/ton.

In January 2006 Mitsubishi Heavy Industries announced the completion of the replacement of the internal structure of the No.1 reactor. It was the world's first all-in-one-piece extraction and replacement of the core internals of a PWR reactor. The upper and lower internals of the reactor were replaced in order to accommodate more control rods and allow for higher fuel burnup.

In 2010, a partial MOX fuel core was loaded into the No.3 reactor for the cycle beginning 24 February 2010.

=== Maintenance in 2011 ===
On Sunday 4 September reactor no. 1 was shut down for regular inspections. These check-ups would last at least three months. At that time reactor No.3 was also shut down, although the normal inspections were long time finished before September. To resume operation, a stress test was required for all suspended reactors by the government, after the accidents in Fukushima. The Ehime prefectural government said it would decide whether to approve the resumption of operations after the results of the safety test came out. The Shikoku Electric Power Company said that if the No. 3 reactor did not resume operations, power supplies would be very tight in winter when electricity demand would be high. It was considered to restart a thermal power-plant which had been long out of use.

=== Nuclear evacuation drill held in 2012 ===
In February 2012 an evacuation drill was held in the prefecture Ehime and Shimane. The drill was done to mimic the situation of a reactor cooling failure after a huge earthquake. The evacuation-zones were expanded from 10 to 30 kilometers after the disaster in Fukushima Daiichi nuclear power plant. In this evacuation drill some 10.000 people were taken out of the area round the nuclear power plant, with buses, helicopters and boats of the Maritime Self-Defense Force. The residents in the town of Ikata, commanded by disaster announcements on the radio to gather at a junior high school. From there they were taken by buses to a shelter some 50 kilometers further. This drill was the first executed on this scale, and it was also the first time that so many people were evacuated out from their town.

=== Unit 3 restart in 2016 ===
On 19 April 2016, unit 3 received from NRA the final approval to restarting. On 27 June, Shikoku Electric completed loading 157 fuel assemblies, of which 16 uranium-plutonium mixed oxide (MOX). Unit 3 achieved criticality on 13 August and resumed commercial service on 7 September. However, on 13 December 2017 the Hiroshima High Court revoked the lower court decision, ordering the close of the unit until the end of September 2018. Shikoku Electric plans to appeal. The dispute centres on the evaluation of earthquake risk under the stricter post Fukushima regulations. In January 2020 the High Court passed a further injunction against the operation of unit 3, again in part because an active fault nearby could not be ruled out as a full geological survey of the area had not been conducted.

=== Unit 3 restart in 2021 ===
In March 2021, the Hiroshima High Court revoked the injunction, following an appeal by the plant operator, clearing it to resume operations. The court said residents bear the burden of proof for risks posed by the nuclear plant. The plant operator then planned to restart the reactor in October. Unit 3 was eventually restarted on 2 December 2021.

== In popular culture ==
A screenshot of Godzilla approaching Ikata Nuclear Power Plant in the 1995 film Godzilla vs. Destoroyah.

In the film Godzilla vs. Destoroyah (1995), Godzilla, suffering from nuclear meltdown, approached the nuclear plant for energy, emerging from below the surface of the Bungo Channel. The Japan Self Defense Forces are deployed to stall Godzilla and defend the facility, fearing that a direct attack against him could cause a nuclear explosion and destroy the planet. Thankfully, the Super X-III aircraft comes to the rescue and temporarily freezes Godzilla before he can begin attacking the power plant.

== See also ==
- List of nuclear power plants in Japan
