= Kuro-shima (Ehime) =

Uninhabited island off Shikoku, Japan

Coordinates: 33°27′22″N 132°20′55″E

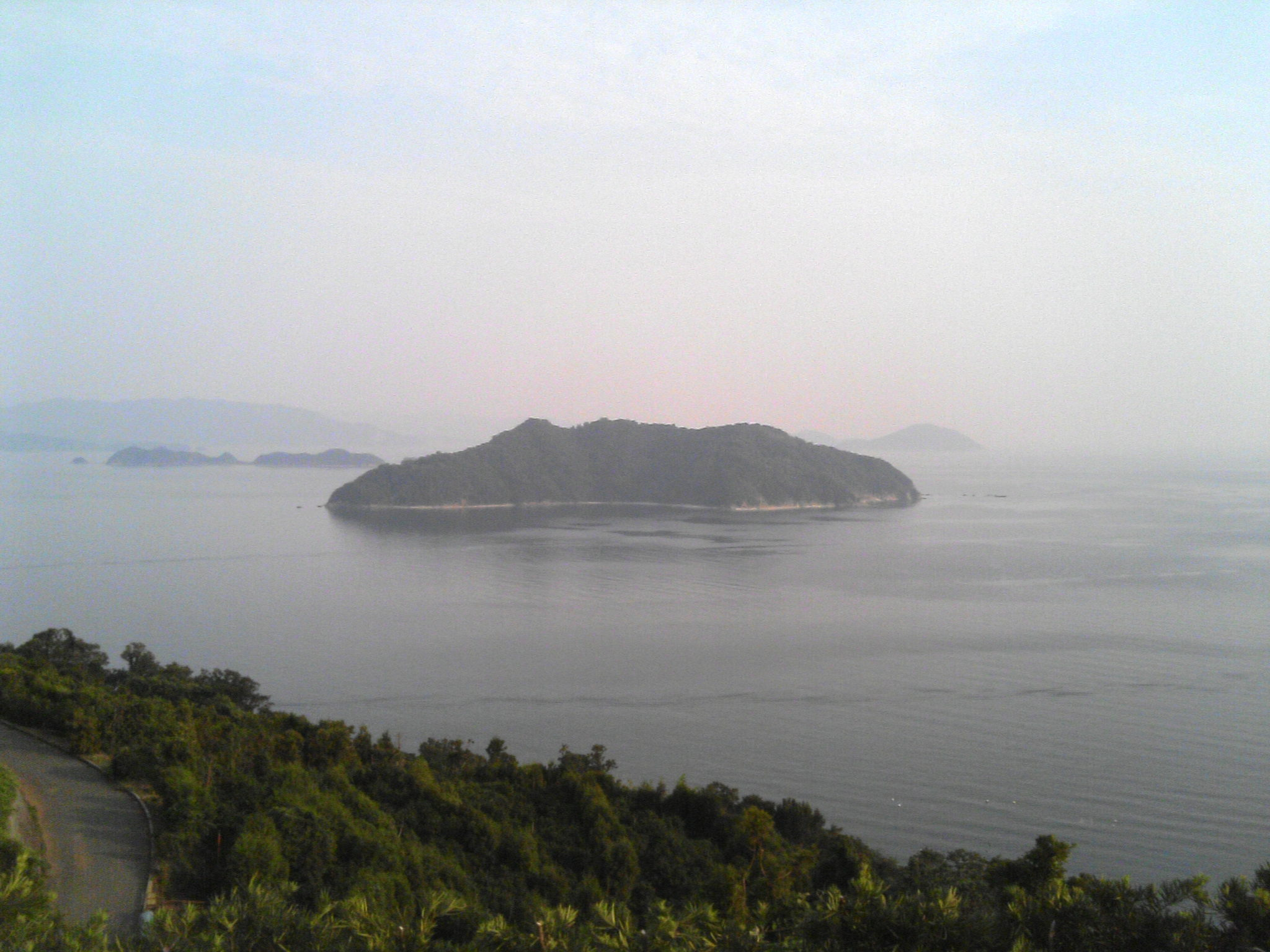
A view of Kuro-shima from the Sadamisaki Peninsula

Kuro-shima (黒島) is a small, uninhabited island in the Uwa Sea (Pacific Ocean) off the coast of Shikoku, Japan. It belongs to the town of Ikata, Ehime Prefecture.

Though the island is uninhabited now, in the 13th-century text A Collection of Things Heard, Ancient and Modern (古今著聞集, Kokon chomon shū) is written the following legend:

In the Antei era (1227–1229), in the Yano area of the Iyo Province there was an island called Kuro-shima. It was about one ri (4 km) from the nearest settlement. On the island lived a fisherman known as the Daiku of Katsurahazama (thought to be modern-day Honai). One night he was walking around looking for a good place to set his nets when he saw that the spots with fish appeared to glow in the night darkness. By every shore of the island the light glowed so brightly that he gleefully put out his nets, only to find that there were no fish at all. Instead what he pulled up was countless rats. After he pulled them ashore the rats fled, disappearing into the darkness. The fisherman was stunned. How strange this was! The island thus became full of rats, which ate all of the crops, and made the land infertile to this day. Though rats can of course be found on land, what a strange thing it is that they would be at the bottom of the sea!
