= Hōyo Strait =

Narrowest part of the Bungo channel

Coordinates: 33.300°N 131.967°E

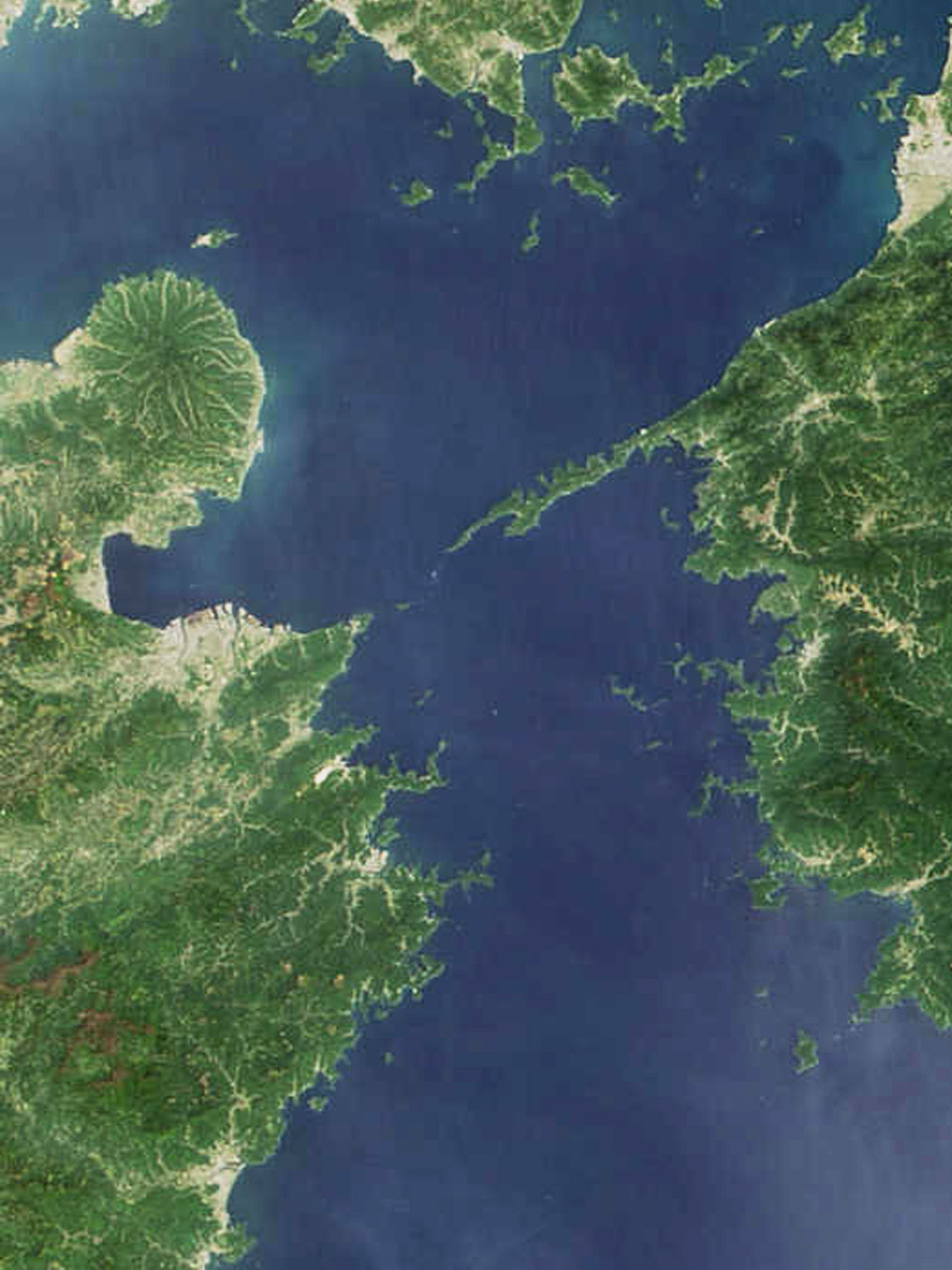
Hōyo Strait between the Sadamisaki Peninsula in Ehime Prefecture (right), the westernmost point of Shikoku, and Cape Sekizaki in Ōita Prefecture (left)

The Hōyo Strait (豊予海峡, Hōyo Kaikyō) is the strait at the narrowest part of the Bungo Channel in Japan.
