= Shikoku Electric Power =

Japanese electric utility company

Shikoku Electric Power Company, Incorporated
- Type: Public TYO: 9507
- Industry: Electricity, Gas
- Founded: 1955-5-1
- Headquarters: 2-5, Marunouchi, Takamatsu, Kagawa, Japan
- Revenue: ¥526 billion yen (2007/3)
- Number of employees: 4,432 (2007/9)
- Website: yonden.co.jp

The Shikoku Electric Power Company (四国電力, Shikoku Denryoku; "Yonden" for short) is the electric provider for the 4 prefectures of the Shikoku island in Japan with some exceptions. Their image character is Akari-chan (あかりちゃん).

On April 12, 1991 the company instituted Akari-chan as their image character and at the same time introduced the Romanized nickname of Yonden (yon is another reading for 4, which occurs in Shikoku).

The company controls numerous 'ko-gaisha' (subsidiaries), such as an electronic parts maker, a cable media company, electric services pro diver and also an internet service provider called "Akari-net". Those who sign a contract with Yonden may be eligible to get free internet access. Yonden institutes automatic filtering of web content.

== Generation ==
El. Production
Type	Megawatt
Hydro	1.143
Thermal	3.696
Nuclear	2.022
Other	1

== See also ==
- Energy in Japan
- Nuclear power in Japan
