= Sadamisaki Peninsula =

Peninsula in Japan

Coordinates: 33°26′N 132°13′E

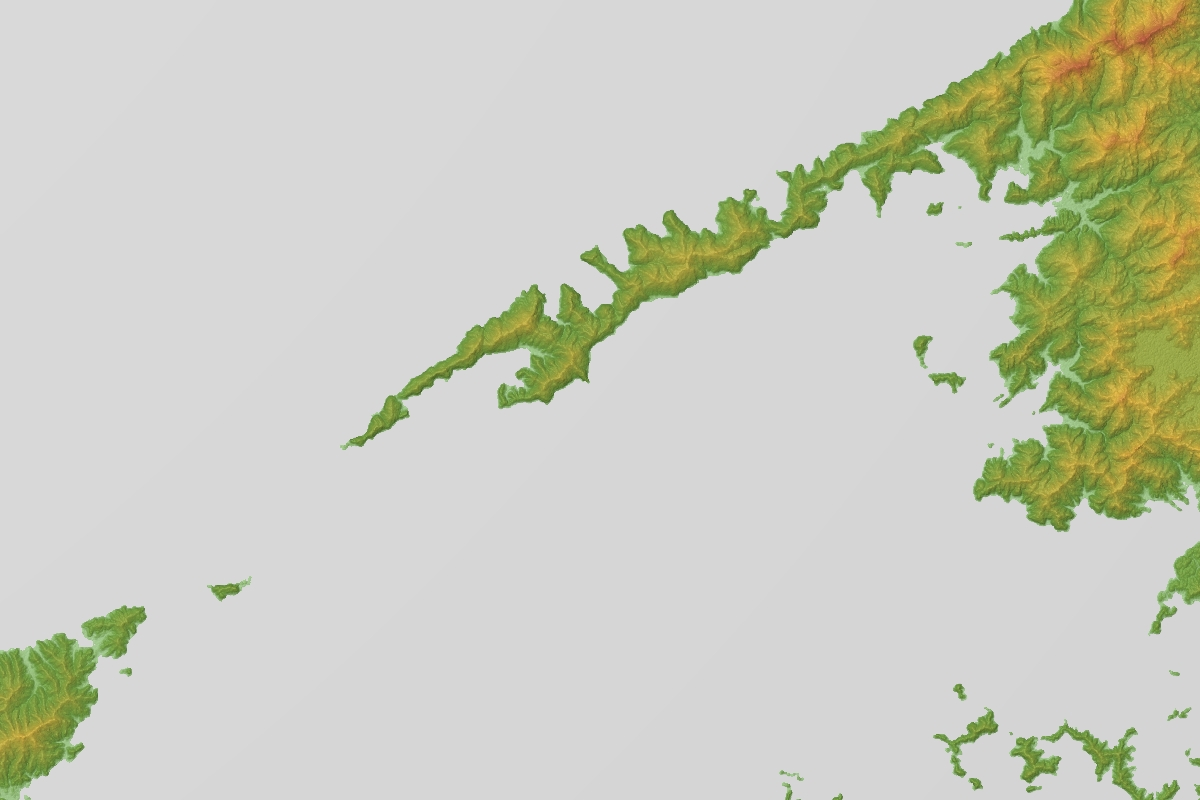
Sadamisaki Peninsula in Shikoku (right)

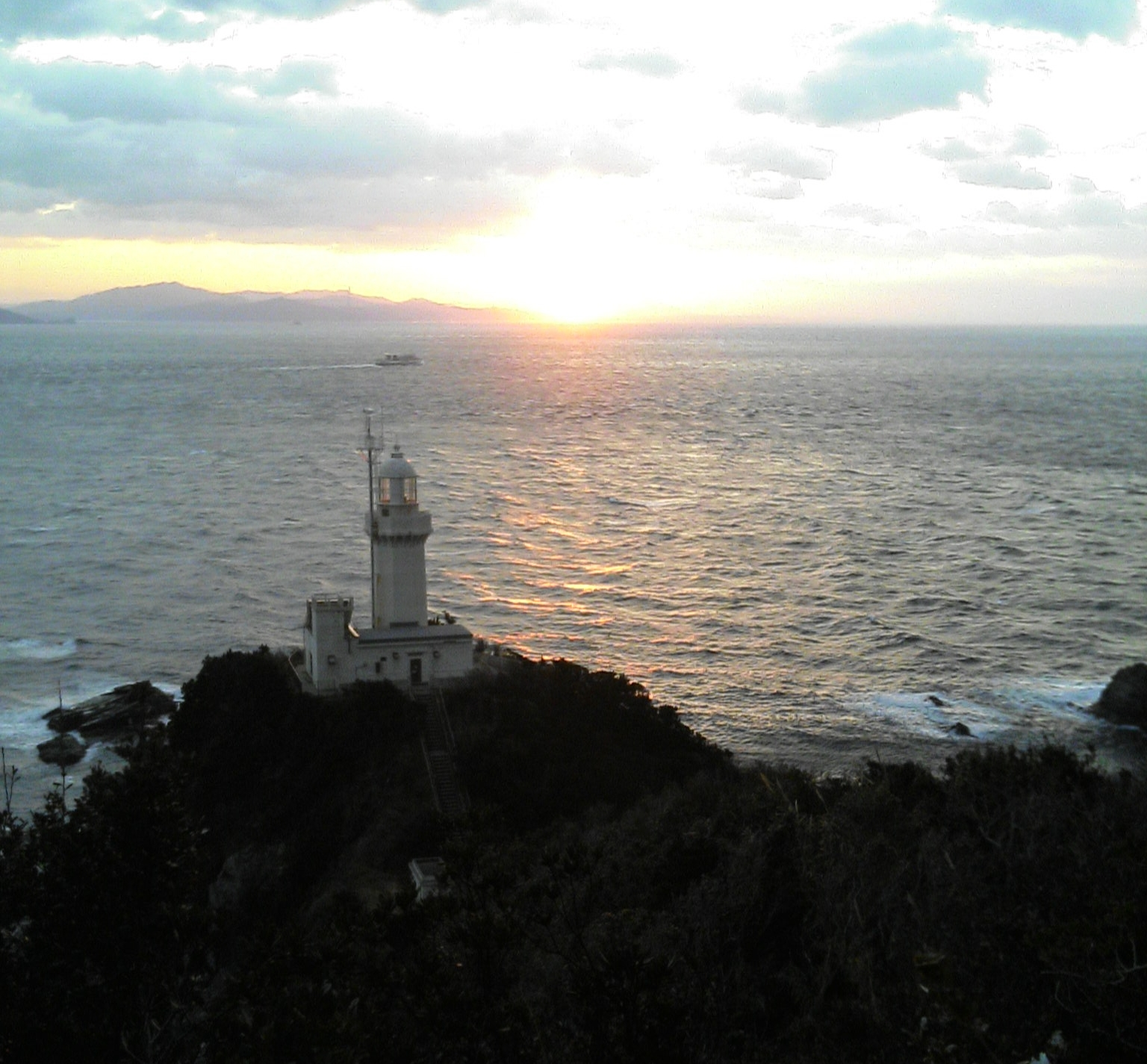
The Sadamisaki Lighthouse stands at the tip of the peninsula

The Sadamisaki Peninsula (佐田岬半島, Sadamisaki-hantō) is the westernmost part of the island of Shikoku, covered by the town of Ikata, Ehime Prefecture and home to the Ikata Nuclear Power Plant. It is sometimes referred to as the "Misaki Peninsula." This landmass juts out in a straight line from close to Yawatahama Port out west-southwest along the Japan Median Tectonic Line. About 45 kilometres (28 mi) in length, it separates the Seto Inland Sea in the north from the Uwa Sea in the south.To the west is the Hōyo Strait, which separates Shikoku from Kyūshū.

The Sadamisaki is the narrowest peninsula in Japan for its length. At the tip of the peninsula is Cape Sada, designated as a national park of the Seto Inland Sea. The lower region is designated as the Uwa Sea National Park land. The Sadamisaki "Melody Line" on Route 197 is famous for the scattered cherry blossoms trees along the mountains.

This combination of mountains and ocean make the area a popular sightseeing destination, especially in the spring when the sakura (cherry blossoms) are in bloom.

== Transportation ==
The Sadamisaki Peninsula is extremely mountainous. Until the completion of national highway Route 197, traversing the peninsula by car was quite inconvenient.

Ferries run from Misaki Port at the tip of the peninsula to Saganoseki Port (Ōita).

== Demographics ==
As of June 30, 2023, Ikata Town reported a population of 8,196 people within 4,396 households.
