= 2021 J2 League =

J2 League
- Season: 2021
- Dates: 27 February – 5 December
- Champions: Júbilo Iwata; 1st J2 title 3rd D2 title
- Promoted: Júbilo Iwata; Kyoto Sanga
- Relegated: SC Sagamihara; Ehime FC; Giravanz Kitakyushu; Matsumoto Yamaga
- Matches: 462
- Goals: 1,102 (2.39 per match)
- Top goalscorer: Lukian (22 goals)
- Highest attendance: 14,759
- Lowest attendance: 559 (excluding matches played behind closed doors)
- Total attendance: 1,806,409
- Average attendance: 3,910

The 2021 J2 League, also known as the 2021 Meiji Yasuda J2 League (2021 明治安田生命J2リーグ, 2021 Meiji Yasuda Seimei J2 Rīgu) for sponsorship reasons, was the 23rd season of J2 League, the top Japanese professional league for association football clubs, since its establishment in 1999. The league started on 27 February 2021 and ended on 5 December.

== Clubs ==
Locations of the 2021 J2 League teams
Greater Tokyo Area J2 League teams

With no relegations from J1 League, the second division hosted the same number of teams, since there were also no relegations to J3 League in 2020, but there were two promotions from the third division. This year, though, saw four relegations to J3 to match the four relegations from J1.

Tokushima Vortis left the second division after six seasons, coming back to J1, this time winning the title and topping the table in 2020. Despite losing in the last match against rivals and runners-up Avispa Fukuoka, both clubs assured themselves of the promotion to J1 with one game still to be played.

Meanwhile, in J3 League, two teams won promotion to J2: Blaublitz Akita stormed their way to J2, winning their second title in J3, but this time also getting promoted to J2 (unlike what happened in 2017, when they won, but did not hold a J2 license; this was their first appearance in the second tier since 1986). In the last match of the season, SC Sagamihara overcame Nagano Parceiro and clinched their first promotion ever, leaving the third division after seven seasons.

Club Name	Home Town	Stadium	Capacity	Last season	License
Albirex Niigata	Niigata & Seiro, Niigata	Denka Big Swan Stadium	42,300	J2 (11th)	J1
Blaublitz Akita	Akita	Soyu Stadium	20,125	Promoted from J3 (champions)	J2
Ehime FC	All cities/towns in Ehime (Note: centering on Matsuyama)	Ningineer Stadium	20,000	J2 (21st)	J1
Fagiano Okayama	All cities/towns in Okayama (Note: centering on Okayama, Kurashiki, Tsuyama)	City Light Stadium	20,000	J2 (17th)	J1
Giravanz Kitakyushu	Kitakyushu, Fukuoka	Mikuni World Stadium Kitakyushu	15,066	J2 (5th)	J1
JEF United Chiba	Chiba & Ichihara, Chiba	Fukuda Denshi Arena	18,500	J2 (14th)	J1
Júbilo Iwata	Iwata, Shizuoka	Yamaha Stadium	15,165	J2 (6th)	J1
Kyoto Sanga	Cities/towns in Kyoto (Note: Kyoto, Uji, Joyo, Kyotanabe, Muko, Nagaokakyo, Kizugawa, Kameoka, Nantan, Kyotanba, Fukuchiyama, Maizuru, Ayabe)	Sanga Stadium by Kyocera	21,600	J2 (8th)	J1
Machida Zelvia	Machida, Tokyo	Machida Athletic Stadium	10,600	J2 (19th)	J1
Matsumoto Yamaga	Cities/towns in Nagano (Note: Matsumoto, Azumino, Yamagata, Shiojiri, Omachi, Ikeda, Ikusaka, Minowa, Asahi)	Sunpro Alwin	20,396	J2 (13th)	J1
Mito HollyHock	Cities/towns in Ibaraki (Note: Mito, Hitachinaka, Kasama, Naka, Omitama, Ibaraki, Shirosato, Oarai, Tokai)	K's denki Stadium Mito	12,000	J2 (9th)	J2
Montedio Yamagata	All cities/towns in Yamagata (Note: centering on Yamagata, Tendo, Tsuruoka)	ND Soft Stadium	20,315	J2 (7th)	J1
Omiya Ardija	Saitama, Saitama	NACK5 Stadium Omiya	15,500	J2 (15th)	J1
Renofa Yamaguchi	All cities/towns in Yamaguchi	Yamaguchi Ishin Park Stadium	20,000	J2 (22nd)	J1
FC Ryukyu	All cities/towns in Okinawa (Note: centering on Okinawa)	Tapic Kenso Hiyagon Stadium	25,000	J2 (16th)	J1
SC Sagamihara	Sagamihara	Gion Stadium	15,300	Promoted from J3 (runners-up)	J2
Tochigi SC	Utsunomiya, Tochigi	Kanseki Stadium Tochigi	25,244	J2 (10th)	J1
Thespakusatsu Gunma	All cities/towns in Gunma (Note: centering on Kusatsu and Maebashi)	Shoda Shoyu Stadium Gunma	15,253	J2 (20th)	J1
V-Varen Nagasaki	All cities/towns in Nagasaki Prefecture (Note: centering on Nagasaki and Isahaya)	Nagasaki Athletic Stadium	20,246	J2 (3rd)	J1
Ventforet Kofu	All cities/towns in Yamanashi Prefecture (Note: centering on Kofu and Nirasaki)	Yamanashi Chuo Bank Stadium	17,000	J2 (4th)	J1
Tokyo Verdy	All cities/towns in Tokyo	Ajinomoto Stadium	49,970	J2 (12th)	J1
Zweigen Kanazawa	All cities/towns in Ishikawa (Note: centering on Kanazawa, Nonoichi, Kahoku, Tsubata, Tsubata)	Ishikawa Kanazawa Stadium	20,000	J2 (18th)	J1

=== Personnel and kits ===
Club	Manager	Captain	Kit manufacturer
Albirex Niigata	(Spain) Albert Puig	(Japan) / (New Zealand) Michael Fitzgerald (Japan) Yuto Horigome (Japan) Yuzuru Shimada	(Germany) Adidas
Blaublitz Akita	(Japan) Ken Yoshida	(Japan) Ryota Nakamura	(Brazil) ATHLETA
Ehime FC	(Japan) Noritada Saneyoshi	(Japan) Takanori Maeno	(Japan) Mizuno
Fagiano Okayama	(Japan) Kenji Arima	TBA	(Brazil) Penalty
Giravanz Kitakyushu	(Japan) Shinji Kobayashi	(Japan) Kota Muramatsu	(Brazil) Penalty
JEF United Chiba	(South Korea) Yoon Jong-hwan	(Japan) Daisuke Suzuki	(Italy) Kappa
Júbilo Iwata	(Japan) Masakazu Suzuki	(Japan) Kentaro Oi	(Germany) Puma
Kyoto Sanga	(South Korea) Cho Kwi-jae	(Japan) Temma Matsuda	(Germany) Puma
Machida Zelvia	(Serbia) Ranko Popović	(Japan) Hiroki Mizumoto	(Japan) SVOLME
Matsumoto Yamaga	(Japan) Kei Shibata	(Japan) Hayuma Tanaka	(Germany) Adidas
Mito HollyHock	(Japan) Tadahiro Akiba	(Japan) Masato Nakayama	(Japan) soccer junky
Montedio Yamagata	(Australia) Peter Cklamovski	(Japan) Takumi Yamada	(Brazil) Penalty
Omiya Ardija	(Japan) Ken Iwase	(Japan) Yuta Mikado	(United States) Under Armour
Renofa Yamaguchi	(Japan) Susumu Watanabe	(Japan) Joji Ikegami	(Brazil) Finta
FC Ryukyu	(Japan) Tetsuhiro Kina	(Japan) Kazumasa Uesato	(Japan) sfida
SC Sagamihara	(Japan) Fumitake Miura	(Japan) Jiro Kamata	(Japan) gol.
Tochigi SC	(Japan) Kazuaki Tasaka	TBA	(Brazil) ATHLETA
Thespakusatsu Gunma	(Japan) Ryosuke Okuno	(Japan) Kodai Watanabe	(Spain) Kelme
V-Varen Nagasaki	(Japan) Takayuki Yoshida	(Japan) Hiroki Akino	(England) Umbro
Ventforet Kofu	(Japan) Akira Ito	(Japan) Ryohei Arai	(Japan) Mizuno
Tokyo Verdy	(Japan) Hideki Nagai	(Japan) Tomohiro Taira	(Brazil) ATHLETA
Zweigen Kanazawa	(Japan) Masaaki Yanagishita	(Japan) Tomonobu Hiroi	(Denmark) hummel

=== Managerial changes ===
Team	Outgoing	Manner	Exit date		Position in table	Incoming	Incoming date		Ref.
Team	Outgoing	Manner	Announced on	Departed on	Position in table	Incoming	Announced on	Arrived on	Ref.
Ehime FC	(Japan) Shigenari Izumi	Resigned	4 April 2021	4 April 2021	22nd	(Japan) Noritada Saneyoshi	7 April 2021	7 April 2021	
V-Varen Nagasaki	(Japan) Takayuki Yoshida	Demoted to Assistant Coach	3 May 2021	3 May 2021	11th	(Japan) Kazuki Sato (Caretaker)	3 May 2021	4 May 2021	
V-Varen Nagasaki	(Japan) Kazuki Sato	End of term	3 May 2021	6 May 2021	15th	(Japan) Hiroshi Matsuda	3 May 2021	6 May 2021	
FC Ryukyu	(Japan) Yasuhiro Higuchi	Sacked	20 October 2021	20 October 2021	8th	(Japan) Tetsuhiro Kina	20 October 2021	20 October 2021	

== Foreign players ==
As of 2021 season, there are no more restrictions on a number of signed foreign players, but clubs can only register up to five foreign players for a single match-day squad. Players from J.League partner nations (Thailand, Vietnam, Myanmar, Malaysia, Cambodia, Singapore, Indonesia and Qatar) are exempt from these restrictions.

- Players name in **bold** indicates the player is registered during the mid-season transfer window.
- Player's name in italics indicates the player has Japanese nationality in addition to their FIFA nationality, or is exempt from being treated as a foreign player due to having been born in Japan and being enrolled in, or having graduated from school in the country.

Club	Player 1	Player 2	Player 3	Player 4	Player 5	Player 6	Former players
Montedio Yamagata	(Brazil) Vinícius Araújo	(South Korea) Min Seong-jun	(Spain) Víctor Ibáñez	(Curaçao) **Quenten Martinus**			
Mito HollyHock	(Philippines) Jefferson Tabinas						
Tochigi SC	(Brazil) Juninho						
Thespakusatsu Gunma							
Omiya Ardija	(Bosnia and Herzegovina) Nermin Haskić	(Serbia) Filip Kljajić	(Norway) Ibba Laajab				
JEF United Chiba	(Brazil) Saldanha	(South Korea) Jang Min-gyu					
Tokyo Verdy	(Brazil) Matheus Vidotto	(Brazil) Jaílton Paraíba					
Machida Zelvia	(North Korea) Jong Tae-se	(Brazil) Dudu					
Ventforet Kofu	(Brazil) Mendes	(Brazil) Willian Lira	(Brazil) Paulo Baya				
Matsumoto Yamaga	(South Korea) Goh Dong-min	(Brazil) Lucão	(Brazil) **Serginho**				
Albirex Niigata	(Uruguay) Gonzalo González	(Peru) Kazuyoshi Shimabuku					
Zweigen Kanazawa	(Brazil) Rodolfo						
Jubilo Iwata	(Colombia) Fabián González	(Brazil) Lukian	(Moldova) Alexei Koșelev				
Kyoto Sanga	(Netherlands) Jordy Buijs	(Nigeria) Peter Utaka	(Nigeria) **Origbaajo Ismaila**				
Fagiano Okayama	(Brazil) Paulinho	(South Korea) Lee Yong-jae	(South Korea) Yu Yong-hyeon	(Brazil) **Brenner**	(Australia) **Mitchell Duke**		
Renofa Yamaguchi	(Brazil) Renan	(Brazil) Henik					
Blaublitz Akita							
Ehime FC							
SC Sagamihara	(Brazil) Yuri Mamute	(Brazil) Eduardo Kunde	(Brazil) Agenor				
Giravanz Kitakyushu							
V-Varen Nagasaki	(Brazil) Caio César	(Brazil) Freire	(Brazil) Luan	(Colombia) Víctor Ibarbo	(Brazil) Edigar Junio	(Brazil) Wellington Rato	
FC Ryukyu	(Brazil) Felipe Tavares	(Costa Rica) Danny Carvajal	(Brazil) Ramon	(North Korea) Ri Yong-jik	(Thailand) Sittichok Paso	(Brazil) **Vinícius Faria**	

== League table ==
Unlike last season, J. League has then decided to have four relegations to balance the number of teams in place for the 2022 season. While in 2020 no relegation was in place, 2021 saw four teams dropped to J3, re-establishing the number of teams in the third division to at least 17.

Pos	Team	Pld	W	D	L	GF	GA	GD	Pts	Promotion
1	Júbilo Iwata (C, P)	42	27	10	5	75	42	+33	91	Promotion to J1 League
2	Kyoto Sanga (P)	42	24	12	6	59	31	+28	84	Promotion to J1 League
3	Ventforet Kofu	42	23	11	8	65	38	+27	80	
4	V-Varen Nagasaki	42	23	9	10	69	44	+25	78	
5	Machida Zelvia	42	20	12	10	64	38	+26	72	
6	Albirex Niigata	42	18	14	10	61	40	+21	68	
7	Montedio Yamagata	42	20	8	14	61	49	+12	68	
8	JEF United Chiba	42	17	15	10	48	36	+12	66	
9	FC Ryukyu	42	18	11	13	57	47	+10	65	
10	Mito HollyHock	42	16	11	15	59	50	+9	59	
11	Fagiano Okayama	42	15	14	13	40	36	+4	59	
12	Tokyo Verdy	42	16	10	16	62	66	−4	58	
13	Blaublitz Akita (Note: The team did not hold a J1 license, and so was ineligible for promotion to the 2022 J1 League.)	42	11	14	17	41	53	−12	47	
14	Tochigi SC	42	10	15	17	37	51	−14	45	
15	Renofa Yamaguchi	42	10	13	19	37	51	−14	43	
16	Omiya Ardija	42	9	15	18	51	56	−5	42	
17	Zweigen Kanazawa	42	10	11	21	39	60	−21	41	
18	Thespakusatsu Gunma	42	9	14	19	35	56	−21	41	
19	SC Sagamihara (R)	42	8	14	20	33	54	−21	38	Relegation to J3 League
20	Ehime FC (R)	42	7	14	21	38	67	−29	35	Relegation to J3 League
21	Giravanz Kitakyushu (R)	42	7	14	21	35	66	−31	35	Relegation to J3 League
22	Matsumoto Yamaga (R)	42	7	13	22	36	71	−35	34	Relegation to J3 League

Source: Meiji Yasuda J2 League, J.League Data Site
Rules for classification: 1) Points; 2) Goal difference; 3) Goals scored; 4) Head-to-head points; 5) Head-to-head goal difference; 6) Head-to-head goal scored; 7) Fair-play points.
(C) Champions; (P) Promoted; (R) Relegated

== Season statistics ==
=== Top scorers ===
As of September 23rd, 2021.

Rank	Player	Club	Goals
1	(Brazil) Lukian	Júbilo Iwata	17
2	(Nigeria) Peter Utaka	Kyoto Sanga	15
3	(Japan) Junki Koike	Tokyo Verdy	14
4	(Brazil) Edigar Junio	V-Varen Nagasaki	13
5	(Japan) Kaito Taniguchi	Albirex Niigata	11
6	(Japan) Jin Izumisawa	Ventforet Kofu	10
6	(Japan) Yoshiaki Takagi	Albirex Niigata	10
8	(Japan) Masato Nakayama	Mito HollyHock	9
8	(Japan) Yoshiki Fujimoto	Ehime FC	9
10	(Japan) Tomoya Miki	JEF United Chiba	8
10	(Japan) Shunsuke Ota	Machida Zelvia	8

=== Hat-tricks ===
Player	For	Against	Result	Date
(Japan) Yoshiaki Takagi	Albirex Niigata	Tokyo Verdy	7–0 (H)	27 March 2021
(Nigeria) Peter Utaka	Kyoto Sanga	Giravanz Kitakyushu	6–1 (H)	17 April 2021
(Japan) Kunitomo Suzuki	Matsumoto Yamaga	Ventforet Kofu	3–3 (H)	17 April 2021
(Japan) Koki Kiyotake	FC Ryukyu	Matsumoto Yamaga	4–0 (H)	26 June 2021
(Japan) Kaina Yoshio	Machida Zelvia	Ehime FC	5–0 (H)	27 June 2021
(Japan) Asahi Uenaka	V-Varen Nagasaki	Montedio Yamagata	5–1 (H)	14 September 2021
(Brazil) Edigar Junio	V-Varen Nagasaki	Machida Zelvia	3–3 (A)	18 September 2021
(Brazil) Vinícius Araújo^{4}	Montedio Yamagata	Giravanz Kitakyushu	4–0 (H)	5 December 2021

- ^{4} Player scored 4 goals

== See also ==
- Japan Football Association (JFA)

League

- Japanese association football league system
- J.League
  - 2021 J1 League (Tier 1)
  - 2021 J2 League (Tier 2)
  - 2021 J3 League (Tier 3)
- 2021 Japan Football League (JFL) (Tier 4)
- 2021 Regional Champions League (Promotion playoffs to JFL)
- 2021 Regional Leagues (Tier 5/6)

Cup(s)

- 2021 Fuji Xerox Super Cup (Super Cup)
- 2021 Emperor's Cup (National Open Cup)
- 2021 J.League YBC Levain Cup (League Cup)
