= Noritada Saneyoshi =

Japanese footballer and manager

Noritada Saneyoshi 實好 礼忠
Personal information
- Full name: Noritada Saneyoshi
- Date of birth: October 19, 1972 (age 54)
- Place of birth: Minamiuwa, Ehime, Japan
- Height: 1.78 m (5 ft 10 in)
- Position: Defender

Youth career
- 1988–1990: Minamiuwa High School
- 1991–1994: Ritsumeikan University

Senior career*
Years	Team	Apps	(Gls)
1995–2007	Gamba Osaka	236	(1)
Total		236	(1)

Managerial career
- 2016: Gamba Osaka U-23
- 2018: Gamba Osaka U-23
- 2020: Kyoto Sanga FC
- 2021: Ehime FC
Medal record
Gamba Osaka
Winner	J1 League	2005
Winner	J.League Cup	2007
Runner-up	J.League Cup	2005
Runner-up	Emperor's Cup	2006
- * Club domestic league appearances and goals

Noritada Saneyoshi (實好 礼忠, Saneyoshi Noritada; born October 19, 1972) is a former Japanese football player and manager. He is currently the Manager of Ehime FC.

== Playing career ==
Saneyoshi was born in Minamiuwa District, Ehime on October 19, 1972. After graduating from Ritsumeikan University, he joined Gamba Osaka in 1995. He became a regular player from first season and played many matches for the club for a long time. In 1990s, he played many matches as mainly left side back. However he got hurt in 2000 and he could hardly play in the match. From 2002, he played many matches as mainly center back and the club won the 3rd place in 2002 and 2004 J1 League. In 2005, the club were crowned the champions of J1 League for the first time in the club history. He could hardly play in the match from 2006 and retired at the end of the 2007 season.

== Coaching career ==
After retirement, Saneyoshi started coaching career at Gamba Osaka in 2008. He served as coach for youth team (2008) and top team (2009–13). In 2014, he moved to Nagoya Grampus and served as coach. In 2016, he returned to Gamba Osaka. He became a manager for new team Gamba Osaka U-23. and managed the team in 1 season. In July 2018, U-23 team manager Tsuneyasu Miyamoto became a top team manager. So, Saneyoshi became a U-23 team manager again as Miyamoto successor. Saneyoshi resigned with Gamba end of 2018 season. On February 1, 2020, Saneyoshi was appointed manager of Kyoto Sanga FC, where he finished in 8th place. On February 1, 2021, Saneyoshi was appointed as assistant manager of Ehime FC. After the resignation of Shigenari Izumi on April 4, 2021, Saneyoshi was promoted to the position of manager on 7 April 2021.

== Career statistics ==
Appearances and goals by club, season and competition
Club	Season	League			Emperor's Cup		J.League Cup		Total	
Club	Season	Division	Apps	Goals	Apps	Goals	Apps	Goals	Apps	Goals
Gamba Osaka	1995	J1 League	31	0	4	0	-		35	0
Gamba Osaka	1996	J1 League	28	0	4	0	10	0	42	0
Gamba Osaka	1997	J1 League	30	0	3	0	5	0	38	0
Gamba Osaka	1998	J1 League	34	0	0	0	4	0	38	0
Gamba Osaka	1999	J1 League	28	0	0	0	4	0	32	0
Gamba Osaka	2000	J1 League	3	0	0	0	0	0	3	0
Gamba Osaka	2001	J1 League	1	0	3	0	0	0	4	0
Gamba Osaka	2002	J1 League	15	0	1	0	4	0	20	0
Gamba Osaka	2003	J1 League	15	0	2	0	5	0	22	0
Gamba Osaka	2004	J1 League	22	0	4	1	7	0	33	1
Gamba Osaka	2005	J1 League	24	1	0	0	7	0	31	1
Gamba Osaka	2006	J1 League	4	0	4	0	0	0	8	0
Gamba Osaka	2007	J1 League	1	0	0	0	1	0	2	0
Career total			236	1	25	1	47	0	307	2

== Managerial statistics ==
As of 7 April 2021. Manager statistics

Team	From	To	Record				
Team	From	To	G	W	D	L	Win %
Gamba Osaka U-23	2016	2016	30	10	8	12	33.33
Gamba Osaka U-23	2018	2018	15	7	3	5	46.67
Kyoto Sanga FC	2020	2020	42	16	11	15	38.10
Ehime FC	2021		—	−	−	−	—
Total			87	33	22	32	37.93
