= Ryōga =

- Gender: Male

Origin
- Origin: Japanese
- Meaning: Different meanings depending on the kanji used

Ryōga, Ryoga or Ryouga (written: 崚雅 or 凌河) is a masculine Japanese given name. Notable people with the name include:

- Ryoga Ishio (石尾 崚雅; born 2000), Japanese footballer
- Ryoga Sekihara (関原 凌河; born 1991), Japanese footballer

== Fictional characters ==
- Ryoga Hibiki (響 良牙), a character in the manga series Ranma ½
- Ryoga Kanzaka (神坂凌牙), the protagonist in the videogame Neo Utopia Project
