= Mishō, Ehime =

Dissolved municipality in Ehime prefecture, Japan

Misho (御荘町, Mishō-chō) was a town located in Minamiuwa District, Ehime Prefecture, Japan.

As of 2003, the town had an estimated population of 9,471 and a density of 188.18 persons per km^{2}. The total area was 50.33 km^{2}.

On October 1, 2004, Mishō, along with the towns of Ipponmatsu, Jōhen and Nishiumi, and the village of Uchiumi (all from Minamiuwa District), was merged to create the town of Ainan.

Kanjizaiji, one of the Shikoku Pilgrimage temples, is located in the town.

== Climate ==
Climate data for Mishō, Ehime (1991−2020 normals, extremes 1978−present)
Month	Jan	Feb	Mar	Apr	May	Jun	Jul	Aug	Sep	Oct	Nov	Dec	Year
Record high °C (°F)	21.5 (70.7)	22.6 (72.7)	25.0 (77.0)	28.7 (83.7)	32.7 (90.9)	33.3 (91.9)	37.3 (99.1)	39.0 (102.2)	35.8 (96.4)	32.9 (91.2)	25.9 (78.6)	23.7 (74.7)	39.0 (102.2)
Mean daily maximum °C (°F)	11.6 (52.9)	12.6 (54.7)	15.8 (60.4)	20.5 (68.9)	24.4 (75.9)	26.6 (79.9)	30.8 (87.4)	32.0 (89.6)	29.1 (84.4)	24.4 (75.9)	19.2 (66.6)	13.9 (57.0)	21.7 (71.1)
Daily mean °C (°F)	7.3 (45.1)	8.0 (46.4)	10.9 (51.6)	15.4 (59.7)	19.5 (67.1)	22.6 (72.7)	26.5 (79.7)	27.5 (81.5)	24.4 (75.9)	19.3 (66.7)	14.3 (57.7)	9.4 (48.9)	17.1 (62.8)
Mean daily minimum °C (°F)	3.1 (37.6)	3.3 (37.9)	5.9 (42.6)	10.2 (50.4)	14.6 (58.3)	19.0 (66.2)	23.1 (73.6)	23.9 (75.0)	20.5 (68.9)	14.8 (58.6)	9.5 (49.1)	4.9 (40.8)	12.7 (54.9)
Record low °C (°F)	−3.4 (25.9)	−4.5 (23.9)	−3.1 (26.4)	−0.2 (31.6)	3.5 (38.3)	10.0 (50.0)	14.8 (58.6)	16.3 (61.3)	10.1 (50.2)	2.6 (36.7)	−1.2 (29.8)	−3.8 (25.2)	−4.5 (23.9)
Average precipitation mm (inches)	69.3 (2.73)	90.8 (3.57)	139.0 (5.47)	151.5 (5.96)	199.1 (7.84)	318.2 (12.53)	247.6 (9.75)	186.9 (7.36)	228.2 (8.98)	148.2 (5.83)	104.4 (4.11)	80.8 (3.18)	1,963.7 (77.31)
Average precipitation days (≥ 1.0 mm)	8.6	8.9	11.2	9.4	9.4	14.0	10.9	9.7	11.1	8.0	7.9	8.3	117.4
Mean monthly sunshine hours	142.9	150.7	181.0	195.5	195.0	126.7	193.9	217.3	173.9	178.9	158.1	143.5	2,067.5
Source: Japan Meteorological Agency
