= Ainan, Ehime =

Ainan 愛南町
- Town
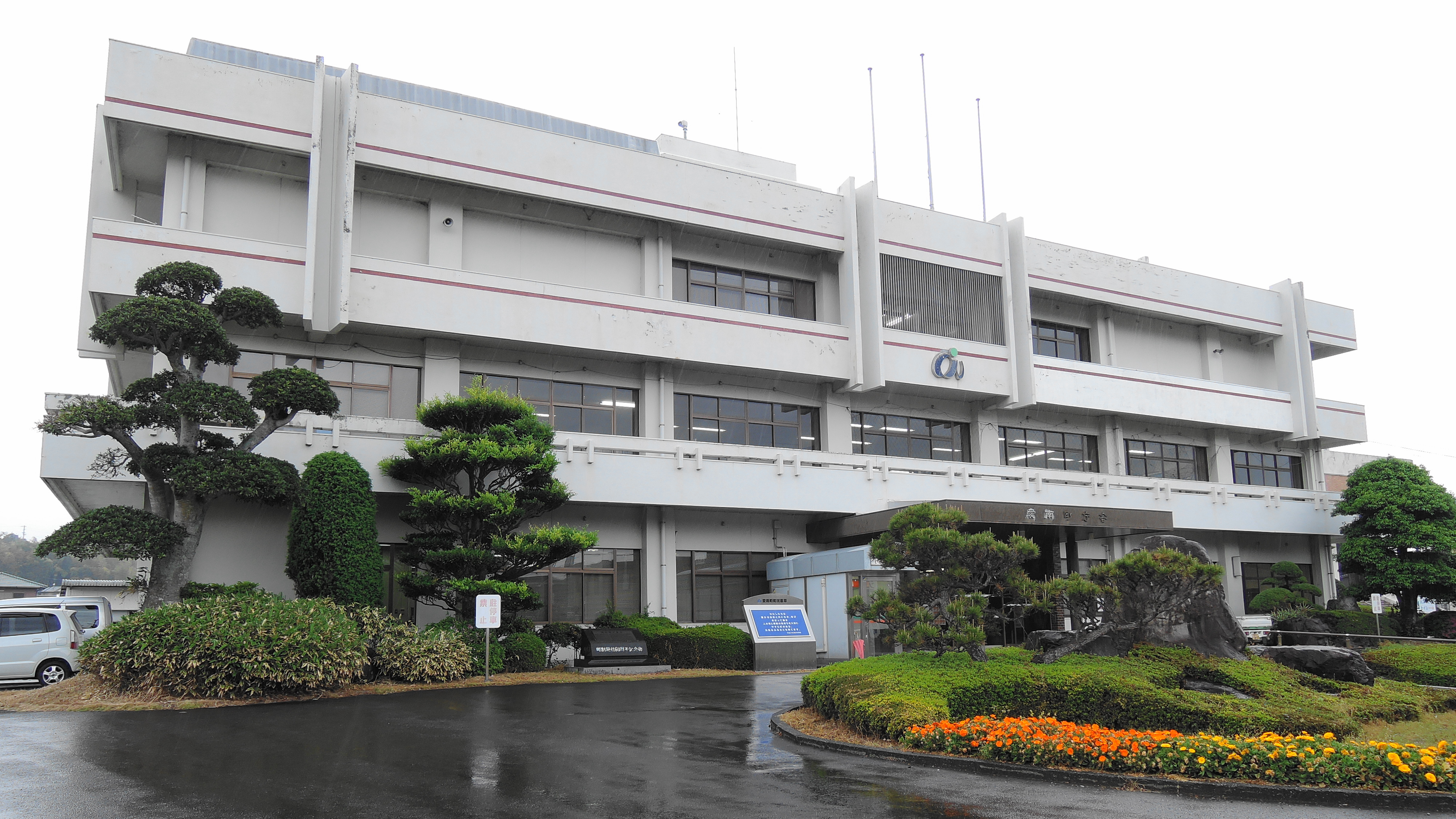
- Ainan Town Hall

- Flag Emblem
- Interactive map of Ainan
- Location in Japan
- Coordinates: 32°58′N 132°35′E
- Country: Japan
- Region: Shikoku
- Prefecture: Ehime
- District: Minamiuwa

Government
  - Mayor: Masanori Nakamura (中村維伯)

Area
  - Total: 238.99 km^{2} (92.27 sq mi)

Population (September 1, 2022)
  - Total: 19,733
  - Density: 82.568/km^{2} (213.85/sq mi)
- Time zone: UTC+09:00 (JST)
- City hall address: 2420 Kō, Jōhen, Ainan-chō, Minamiuwa-gun, Ehime-ken 798-4196
- Website: Official website
- Symbols
- Bird: Japanese white-eye (目白, Mejiro)
- Flower: Akebono azalea (曙躑躅, Akebono tsusuji)
- Tree: Quercus phillyraeoides (姥目樫, Ubamegashi)

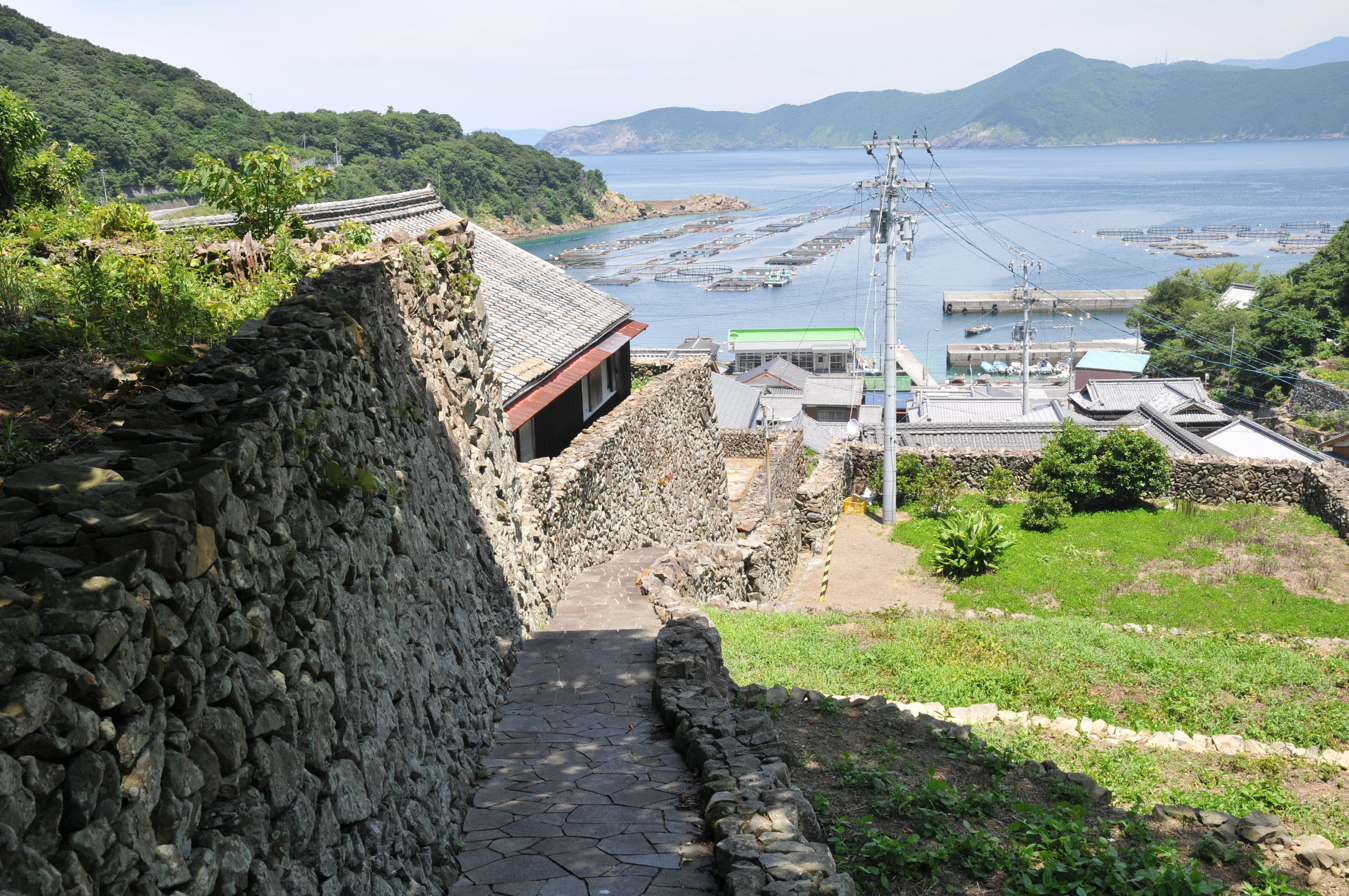
Stone walls of Sotodomari hamlet

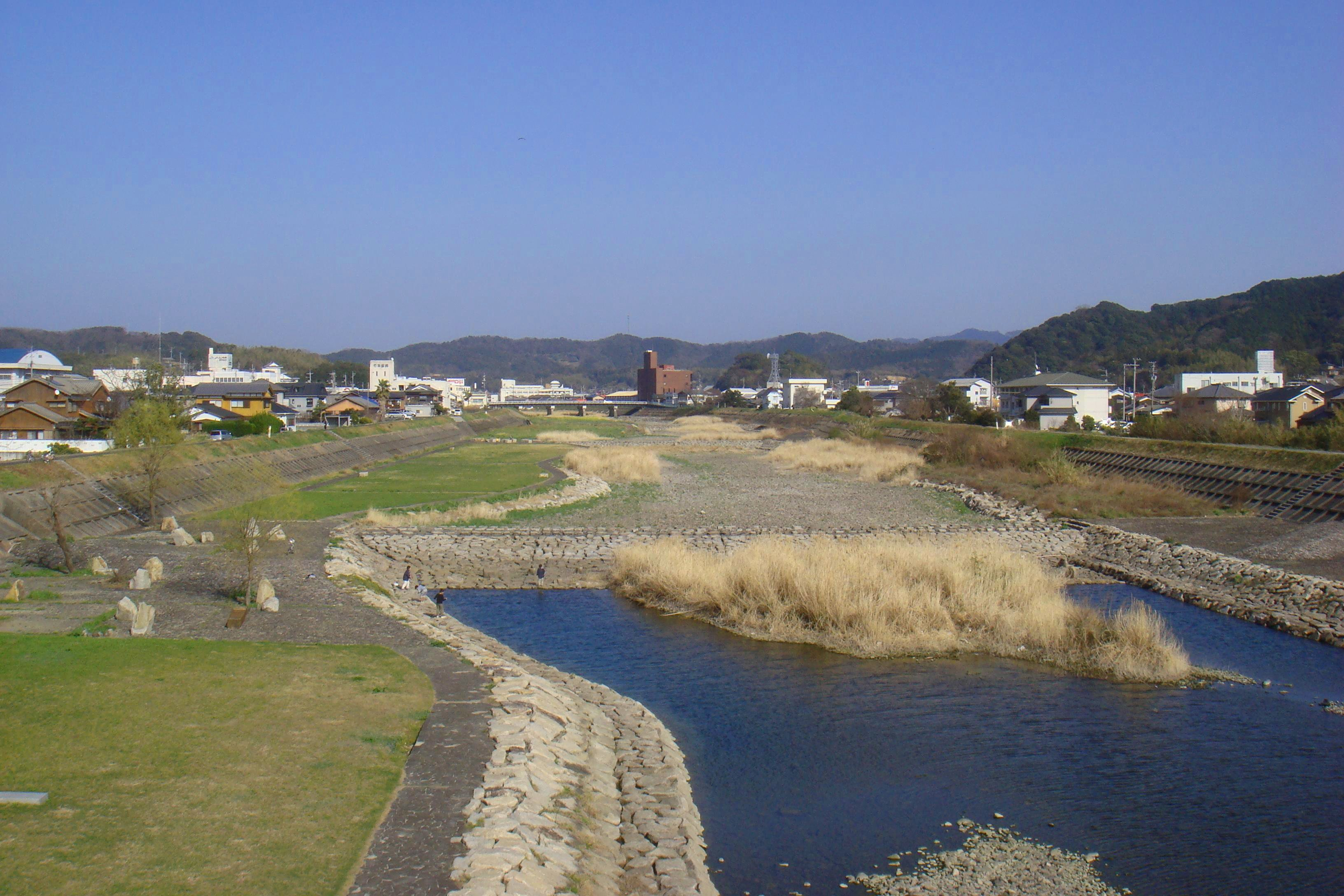
A view of the Sozu River in Ainan

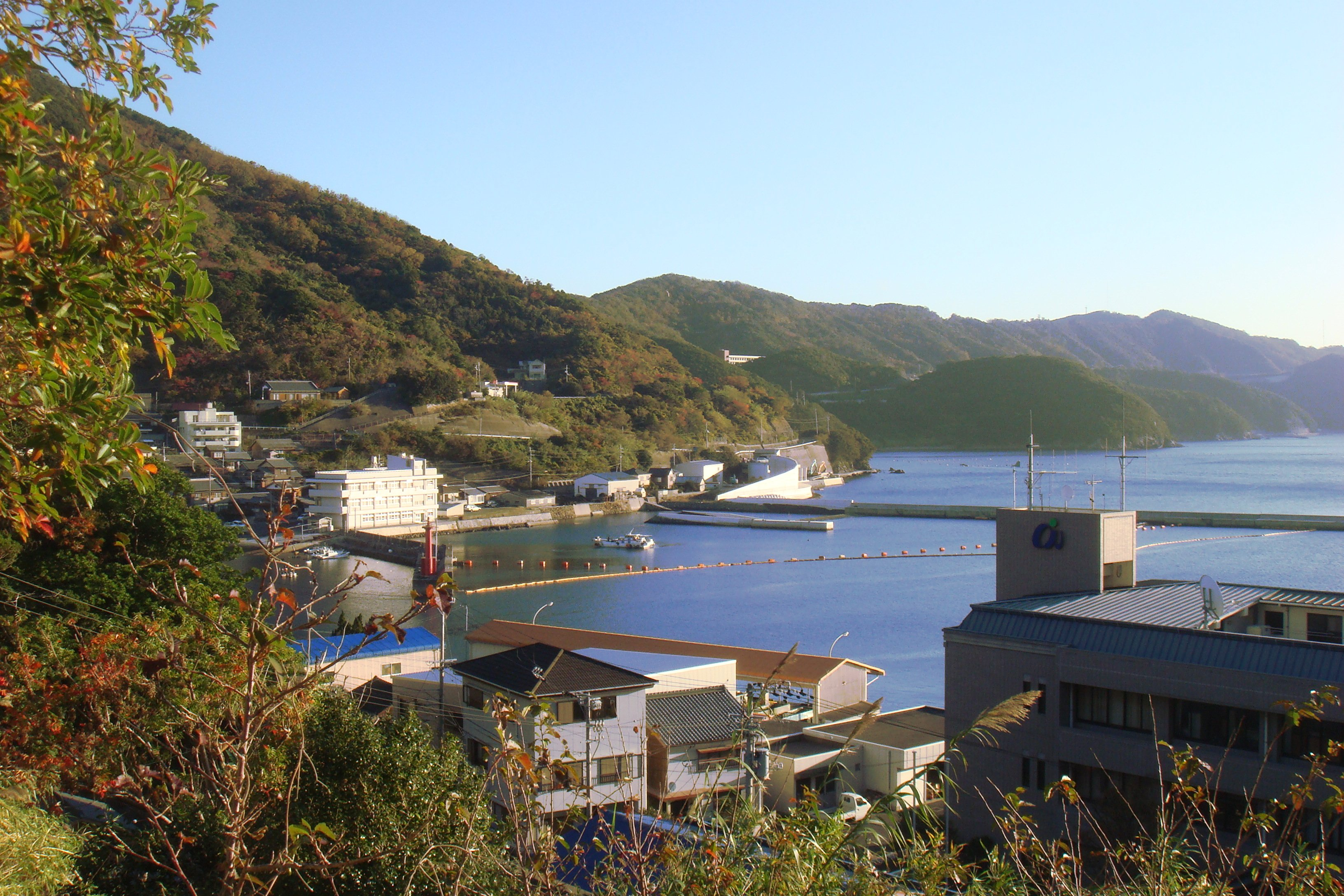
Nishiumi neighborhood in Ainan

Ainan (愛南町, Ainan-chō) is a town in Ehime Prefecture, Japan. As of 1 September 2022, the town had an estimated population of 19,733 in 10054 households, and a population density of 83 persons per km^{2}. The total area of the town is 238.99 square kilometres (92.27 sq mi).

== Geography ==
Ainan is located in far southwestern Ehime Prefecture on the island of Shikoku. It faces Utsumi Bay to the west and Sukumo Bay to the south. The mountainous area that occupies most of the town area plunges directly into the sea, creating a complex ria coastline. At the mouth of the Sozu River, which flows in a large arc in the center, there is a small open flatland, where the government office is located. Parts of the town are within the borders of the Ashizuri-Uwakai National Park. Sasayama Mountain is the highest mountain in Ainan (1,064.4 m) which has a rare variety of azaleas blooming on its peak, best seen in late April, early May.

=== Neighbouring municipalities ===
Ehime Prefecture

- Uwajima

Kōchi Prefecture

- Kōchi
- Sukumo

=== Climate ===
Ainan has a humid subtropical climate (Köppen Cfa) characterized by warm summers and cool winters with light snowfall. The average annual temperature in Ainan is 16.3 °C (61.3 °F). The average annual rainfall is 1,910 mm (75 in) with September as the wettest month. The temperatures are highest on average in January, at around 25.8 °C (78.4 °F), and lowest in January, at around 6.7 °C (44.1 °F). The rainy season runs from June to July. The summer is hot and humid, with infrequent rain showers.

Climate data for Mishō, Ehime (1991−2020 normals, extremes 1978−present)
Month	Jan	Feb	Mar	Apr	May	Jun	Jul	Aug	Sep	Oct	Nov	Dec	Year
Record high °C (°F)	21.5 (70.7)	22.6 (72.7)	25.0 (77.0)	28.7 (83.7)	32.7 (90.9)	33.3 (91.9)	37.9 (100.2)	39.0 (102.2)	35.8 (96.4)	32.9 (91.2)	27.0 (80.6)	23.7 (74.7)	39.0 (102.2)
Mean daily maximum °C (°F)	11.6 (52.9)	12.6 (54.7)	15.8 (60.4)	20.5 (68.9)	24.4 (75.9)	26.6 (79.9)	30.8 (87.4)	32.0 (89.6)	29.1 (84.4)	24.4 (75.9)	19.2 (66.6)	13.9 (57.0)	21.7 (71.1)
Daily mean °C (°F)	7.3 (45.1)	8.0 (46.4)	10.9 (51.6)	15.4 (59.7)	19.5 (67.1)	22.6 (72.7)	26.5 (79.7)	27.5 (81.5)	24.4 (75.9)	19.3 (66.7)	14.3 (57.7)	9.4 (48.9)	17.1 (62.8)
Mean daily minimum °C (°F)	3.1 (37.6)	3.3 (37.9)	5.9 (42.6)	10.2 (50.4)	14.6 (58.3)	19.0 (66.2)	23.1 (73.6)	23.9 (75.0)	20.5 (68.9)	14.8 (58.6)	9.5 (49.1)	4.9 (40.8)	12.7 (54.9)
Record low °C (°F)	−3.4 (25.9)	−4.5 (23.9)	−3.1 (26.4)	−0.2 (31.6)	3.5 (38.3)	10.0 (50.0)	14.8 (58.6)	16.3 (61.3)	10.1 (50.2)	2.6 (36.7)	−1.2 (29.8)	−3.8 (25.2)	−4.5 (23.9)
Average precipitation mm (inches)	69.3 (2.73)	90.8 (3.57)	139.0 (5.47)	151.5 (5.96)	199.1 (7.84)	318.2 (12.53)	247.6 (9.75)	186.9 (7.36)	228.2 (8.98)	148.2 (5.83)	104.4 (4.11)	80.8 (3.18)	1,963.7 (77.31)
Average precipitation days (≥ 1.0 mm)	8.6	8.9	11.2	9.4	9.4	14.0	10.9	9.7	11.1	8.0	7.9	8.3	117.4
Mean monthly sunshine hours	142.9	150.7	181.0	195.5	195.0	126.7	193.9	217.3	173.9	178.9	158.1	143.5	2,067.5
Source: Japan Meteorological Agency

== Demographics ==
Per Japanese census data, the population of Ainan has decreased steadily since the 1950s.

Historical population
Year	Pop.	±%
1920	32,670	—
1930	34,921	+6.9%
1940	36,472	+4.4%
1950	49,359	+35.3%
1960	44,496	−9.9%
1970	34,672	−22.1%
1980	33,800	−2.5%
1990	32,297	−4.4%
2000	29,311	−9.2%
2010	24,061	−17.9%
2020	19,601	−18.5%

== History ==
The area of Ainan was part of ancient Iyo Province. During the Edo period, the area was part of the holdings of Uwajima Domain ruled by the Date clan from their seat at Uwajima Castle. Seven villages within Minamiuwa were established with the creation of the modern municipalities system on October 1, 1889. These were gradually consolidated into the four towns of Jōhen, Mishō, Nishiumi, and Ipponmatsu, and the village of Uchiumi, which merged on October 1, 2004, to form the town of Ainan.

== Government ==
Ainan has a mayor-council form of government with a directly elected mayor and a unicameral town council of 14 members. Ainan contributes one member to the Ehime Prefectural Assembly.

In terms of national politics, Ainan is part of Ehime 3rd district of the lower house of the Diet of Japan. Prior to 2022, the town was part of Ehime 4th district.

== Economy ==
Ainan's economy is centered on commercial fishing, with agriculture and horticulture player smaller roles. The area was traditionally known for cultured pearls, and oyster farming and fish farming remain important. Ainan is known to produce a variety of products, including bonito, red snapper, yellowtail, oysters, noble scallops, and citrus fruits mikan. The main citrus fruit is Ainan Gold Grapefruit. Industry is less developed due to lack of suitable land and poor transportation infrastructure.

== Education ==
Ainan has 11 public elementary schools and four public middle schools operated by the town government and one combined elementary/middle school operated jointly with the city of Sukumo. The town has one public high school operated by the Ehime Prefectural Board of Education.

== Transportation ==
=== Railway ===
Ainan does not have any passenger railway service. The nearest station in the prefecture is the JR Shikoku Uwajima Station. Another near station is the Sukumo Station of the Tosa Kuroshio Railway in Kōchi Prefecture.

=== Highways ===
- National Route 56

== Sister cities ==
- Molinaseca, Spain

== Local attractions ==
- Kanjizai-ji - the 40th temple on the Shikoku Pilgrimage.
- Southern Recreation Facilities Shirobe Park, including Shogenyama Park, Misho Park (Sunpearl, Hotel), Maze Park (Shiden Kai Exhibition Hall, Uwakai Observation Tower)

== Festivals ==
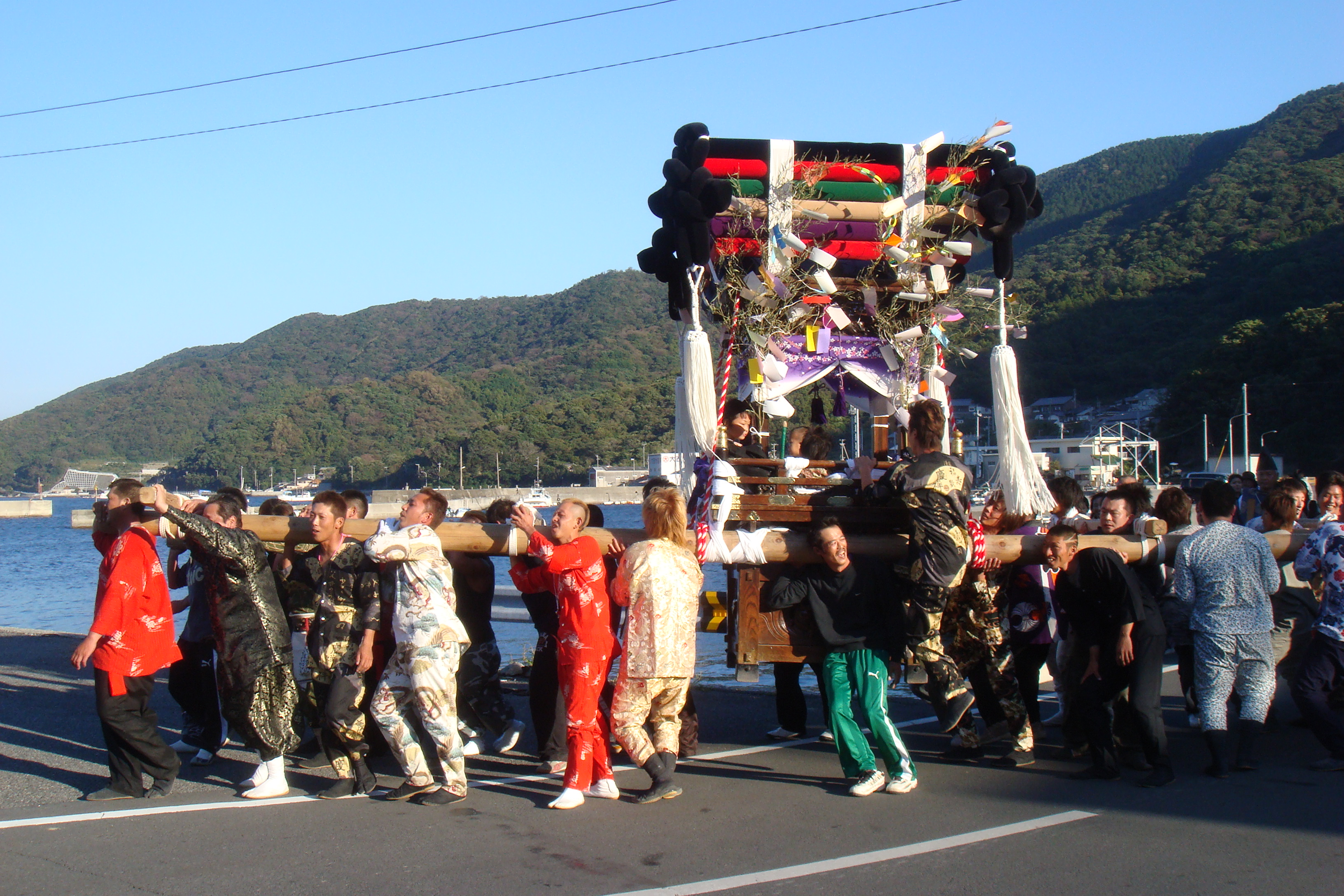
Men carry a mikoshi during the fall festival

A variety of festivals are celebrated in Ainan, including Ainan Tairyo Matsuri in May, Natsu Matsuri (Summer festival), Obon, and Aki Matsuri.

During the Obon festival, Japan's equivalent of All Souls' Day, family members from all over Japan return to their family homes in Ainan to remember the souls of the dead. The festival is celebrated all over town, from the larger parts of Misho to the smallest hamlets in Nishiumi. In the evening, torches and lanterns can be seen along the seashore where the towns are gathering.

Aki Matsuri (fall festival) is a major event for the local people. People gather in many places to watch children perform the Five Deer Dance, or the Karashishi dance. Adults also carry mikoshi and Ushi Oni (a large cow demon float) around town.
