= Ehime FC =

Japanese football club

Ehime 愛媛
- Full name: Ehime Football Club
- Short name: Ehime
- Founded: 1970; 56 years ago
- Stadium: Ningineer Stadium; Matsuyama, Ehime
- Capacity: 20,919
- Chairman: Tadashi Murakami
- Manager: Takeshi Oki
- League: J3 League
- 2025: J2 League, 20th of 20 (relegated)
- Website: ehimefc.com
Home colours	Away colours

Ehime Football Club (愛媛フットボールクラブ, Ehime Futtobōrukurabu) commonly known as Ehime (愛媛FC, Ehime Efu Shī) is a professional football club based in Matsuyama, the capital city of Ehime Prefecture of Japan. The club will play in the J3 League, the third tier of Japanese professional football, starting from the 2026–27 season after finishing 20th in the 2025 J2 League.

The club has won 1 J3 League title in the 2023 season which is their only highest honours in the club history.

== History ==
The club was founded in 1970 as Matsuyama Soccer Club and renamed itself as Ehime Football Club in 1995. For many years it competed in the regional and prefectural league, as Matsuyama was represented in the Japan Soccer League by the local club belonging to the Teijin company.

Ehime was promoted to the Japan Football League in 2003. After winning the JFL in 2005 season, Ehime spent 16 seasons in the J2 League before being relegated to the J3 League at the end of the 2021 season.

On 28 November 2007, Ehime pulled off a major shock by consigning the Urawa Red Diamonds, the AFC Champions League 2007 winners, to a fourth-round exit from the Emperor's Cup courtesy of a 2–0 win on Urawa's home soil, Urawa Komaba Stadium.

On 11 November 2023, after two years absence from Japanese second division, Ehime officially returned to J2 League for 2024 season. They were promoted as J3 League champions of 2023 season with a narrow 1–0 win against their local rivals, FC Imabari on matchweek 35 with Riki Matsuda scored the only goal of the match.

== Stadium ==
The club plays its home games at Ningineer Stadium in Matsuyama, Ehime Prefecture. The stadium, which is owned by Ehime Prefecture, has a capacity of 20,919 spectators. The sports facility is operated and managed by the Ehime Prefectural Sports Promotion Corporation as the designated manager.

== Kit suppliers and shirt sponsors ==
=== Kit evolution ===
Home kit – 1st
2006	2007	2008	2009	2010
2011	2012	2013	2014	2015
2016	2017	2018	2019	2020
2021	2022	2023	2024	2025
2026 -

Away kit – 2nd
2006	2007	2008	2009	2010
2011	2012	2013	2014	2015
2016	2017	2018	2019	2020
2021	2022	2023	2024	2025 -
2026 -

== Players ==
=== First-team squad ===
As of 1 August 2026.

Note: Flags indicate national team as defined under FIFA eligibility rules; some limited exceptions apply. Players may hold more than one non-FIFA nationality.

No.	Pos.	Nation	Player
1	GK	JPN	Kenta Tokushige
4	DF	JPN	Kazuya Kanazawa
5	DF	JPN	Takaya Kuroishi
6	MF	JPN	Masashi Tanioka
7	MF	JPN	Yutaka Soneda
8	MF	JPN	Shuhei Kamimura
9	FW	JPN	Yoshiki Fujimoto
10	FW	JPN	Keisuke Muroi
11	FW	JPN	Yuta Fujihara
13	MF	JPN	Yudai Yamashita
14	MF	JPN	Ryo Saito
16	MF	JPN	Kohei Hosoya (on loan from Sanfrecce Hiroshima)
17	FW	JPN	Shota Tamura
18	DF	JPN	Toru Shibata
22	MF	JPN	Yuhi Takemoto

No.	Pos.	Nation	Player
24	MF	JPN	Kota Miyamoto
27	FW	JPN	Kyota Funahashi
28	MF	JPN	Arata Kozakai
31	GK	JPN	Fuma Shirasaka
36	GK	JPN	Shugo Tsuji
37	DF	JPN	Ryoga Ishio
38	MF	JPN	Shota Hino
39	MF	JPN	Hiroshi Muto
41	DF	JPN	Kenya Otsubo
45	GK	JPN	Kazuma Makiguchi
48	MF	JPN	Toki Yukutomo
49	DF	JPN	Ryota Abe
50	DF	JPN	Koji Sugiyama
51	MF	NGR	Adeola David
99	FW	JPN	Ryonosuke Kabayama

=== Out on loan ===
Note: Flags indicate national team as defined under FIFA eligibility rules; some limited exceptions apply. Players may hold more than one non-FIFA nationality.

No.	Pos.	Nation	Player
3	DF	JPN	Kotaro Yamahara (at Thespa Gunma)
—	FW	JPN	Ryo Sato (at Matsumoto Yamaga FC)
—	DF	KOR	Yu Ye-chan (at Ikoma FC Nara)

No.	Pos.	Nation	Player
—	DF	KOR	Kang Sung-chan (at Edo All United)
—	GK	JPN	Raihei Kurokawa (at Nara Club)

== Management and staff ==
Club officials for 2025

Position	Name
Manager	(Japan) Shinya Aono (Interim)
Coaches	(Japan) Kazuhiro Murakami (Japan) Naoyuki Iwata (South Korea) On Byung-hoon
Goalkeeper coach	(Japan) Keisuke Hada
Physical coach	(Japan) Takehisa Tsugawa
Analysis coach	(Japan) Toya Takemoto
Interpreter	(Japan) Yohei Murayama (Japan) Koji Kurosu
Chief trainer	(Japan) Haruhiko Tsukada
Physiotherapist	(Japan) Yukinari Miyamoto
Conditioning coach	(Japan) Yo Maezuru
Chief doctor	(Japan) Kazuki Morizane
Doctors	(Japan) Takashi Inoue (Japan) Yoshito Homma (Japan) Shinji Iwata (Japan) Tomofumi Kinoshita (Japan) Koji Yamashita
Competent	(Japan) Hideki Ikenaga
Deputy Officers	(Japan) Manato Fujitsu (Japan) Taichi Zen
Mental advisor	(Japan) Konomi Kimura

== Honours ==
Type	Honours	Titles	Season
League	J3 League	1	2023
League	Shikoku Football League	3	1998, 1999, 2000
League	Japan Football League	1	2005

Bold is for those competition that are currently active.

== Managerial history ==
Manager	Tenure		Honours
Manager	Start	Finish	Honours
(Japan) Takashi Onishi	1 February 2001	31 January 2005	
(Japan) Kazuhito Mochizuki	1 February 2005	14 September 2009	− 2005 Japan Football League
(Bosnia and Herzegovina) Ivica Barbarić	15 September 2009	15 November 2012	
(Japan) Kiyotaka Ishimaru	1 February 2013	31 January 2015	
(Japan) Takashi Kiyama	1 February 2015	31 January 2017	
(Japan) Shuichi Mase	1 February 2017	15 May 2018	
(Japan) Kenta Kawai	15 May 2018	31 January 2021	
(Japan) Shigenari Izumi	1 February 2021	4 April 2021	
(Japan) Noritada Saneyoshi	7 April 2021	16 December 2021	
(Japan) Kiyotaka Ishimaru	17 December 2021	21 May 2025	− 2023 J3 League
(Japan) Shinya Aono (Interim)	21 May 2025	Current	

== Season by season record ==
Champions	Runners-up	Third place	Promoted	Relegated

League													J. League Cup	Emperor's Cup
Season	Div.	Teams	Pos.	P	W	D	L	G	A	GD	Pts	Attendance/G	J. League Cup	Emperor's Cup
2006	J2	13	9th	48	14	11	23	51	63	−13	53	4,139	Not eligible	4th round
2007	J2	13	10th	48	12	9	27	39	66	−27	45	3,317	Not eligible	Quarter-final
2008	J2	15	14th	42	9	10	23	39	66	−27	37	3,704	Not eligible	4th round
2009	J2	18	15th	51	12	11	28	54	80	−26	47	3,694	Not eligible	2nd round
2010	J2	19	11th	36	12	12	12	34	34	0	48	4,386	Not eligible	2nd round
2011	J2	20	15th	38	10	14	14	44	54	−10	44	3,475	Not eligible	4th round
2012	J2	22	16th	42	12	14	16	47	46	1	50	3,629	Not eligible	2nd round
2013	J2	22	17th	42	12	11	19	43	52	−9	47	3,950	Not eligible	2nd round
2014	J2	22	19th	42	12	12	18	54	58	−4	48	3,820	Not eligible	4th round
2015	J2	22	5th	42	19	8	15	47	39	8	65	3,771	Not eligible	3rd round
2016	J2	22	10th	42	12	20	10	41	40	1	56	4,089	Not eligible	3rd round
2017	J2	22	15th	42	14	9	19	54	68	−14	51	3,866	Not eligible	3rd round
2018	J2	22	18th	42	12	12	18	34	52	−18	48	3,161	Not eligible	2nd round
2019	J2	22	19th	42	12	6	24	46	62	−16	42	3,780	Not eligible	2nd round
2020 †	J2	22	21st	42	8	10	24	38	68	−30	34	1,512	Not eligible	Did not qualify
2021 †	J2	22	20th	42	7	14	21	38	67	−29	35	1,854	Not eligible	1st round
2022	J3	18	7th	34	14	10	10	51	41	10	52	2,938	Not eligible	Did not qualify
2023	J3	20	1st	38	21	10	7	59	48	11	73	3,674	Not eligible	Did not qualify
2024	J2	20	17th	38	10	10	18	41	69	−28	40	4,721	1st round	Round of 16
2025	J2	20	20th	38	3	13	22	35	71	-36	22	4,714	1st round	2nd round
2026	J3	40	20th	18	8	3	7	25	18	7	28	3,686	N/A	N/A
2026–27	J3	20	TBD	38									TBD	2nd round

Key

- Pos. = Position in league; P = Games played; W = Games won; D = Games drawn; L = Games lost; F = Goals scored; A = Goals conceded; GD = Goals difference; Pts = Points gained
- Attendance/G = Average league home attendance
- † 2020 & 2021 seasons attendance reduced by COVID-19 worldwide pandemic
- Source: J. League Data Site
