= Uchiumi, Ehime =

Dissolved municipality in Ehime prefecture, Japan

Uchiumi (内海村, Uchiumi-mura) was a village located in Minamiuwa District, Ehime Prefecture, Japan. Pearl culturing flourish here, as Uchiumi produces the highest pearl output in Japan.

As of 2003, the village had an estimated population of 2,351 and a density of 119.10 per km^{2}. The total area was 19.74 km^{2}.

On October 1, 2004, Uchiumi, along with the towns of Ipponmatsu, Jōhen, Mishō and Nishiumi (all from Minamiuwa District), was merged to create the town of Ainan.
