= Nishiumi, Ehime =

Dissolved municipality in Ehime prefecture, Japan

Nishiumi (西海町, Nishiumi-chō) was a town located in Minamiuwa District, Ehime Prefecture, Japan.

As of 2005, the town had an estimated population of 2787 and a density of 127.79 persons per km^{2}. The total area was 21.81 km^{2}.

On October 1, 2004, Nishiumi, along with the towns of Ipponmatsu, Jōhen and Mishō, and the village of Uchiumi (all from Minamiuwa District), was merged to create the town of Ainan.

Though now part of Ainan, Nishiumi itself consisted of many individual villages (localities/hamlets) including Fukuura, Funakoshi, Nishiura, and Sotodomari, among others.

The industry in Nishiumi consists primarily of fishing and agriculture, producing things such as bonito and mikan oranges.

== Geography and climate ==
Nishiumi's name literally translates to West sea, which is fitting because the area is a peninsula that juts off the south-western edge of Ehime and into the Pacific Ocean. The geography of Nishiumi is dominated by mountains and inlets, most of which are covered by forest and jungle. Nishiumi lies in Japan's humid subtropical region and has a particularly mild winter, rarely seeing any snow. However, it is known for having very strong winter winds which blow off the ocean.

== Tourism ==
Notable destinations in Nishiumi district include Kashima island which is part of Ashizuri-Uwakai national park, Cape Komo, a scenic overlook, and the town of Sotodomari, which is known for its terraced stone walls.

== Gallery ==
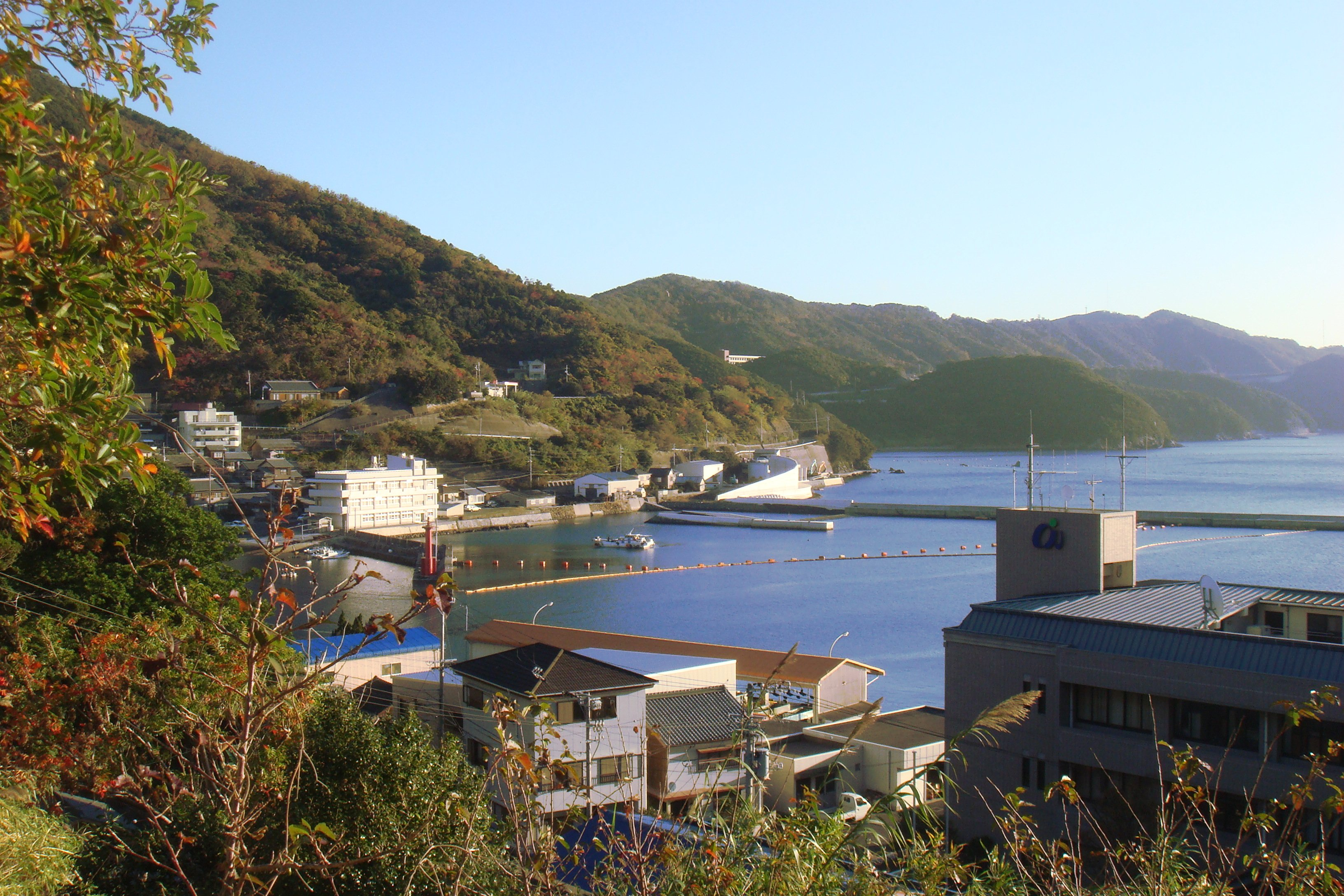
Funakoshi, one of the towns in Nishiumi.

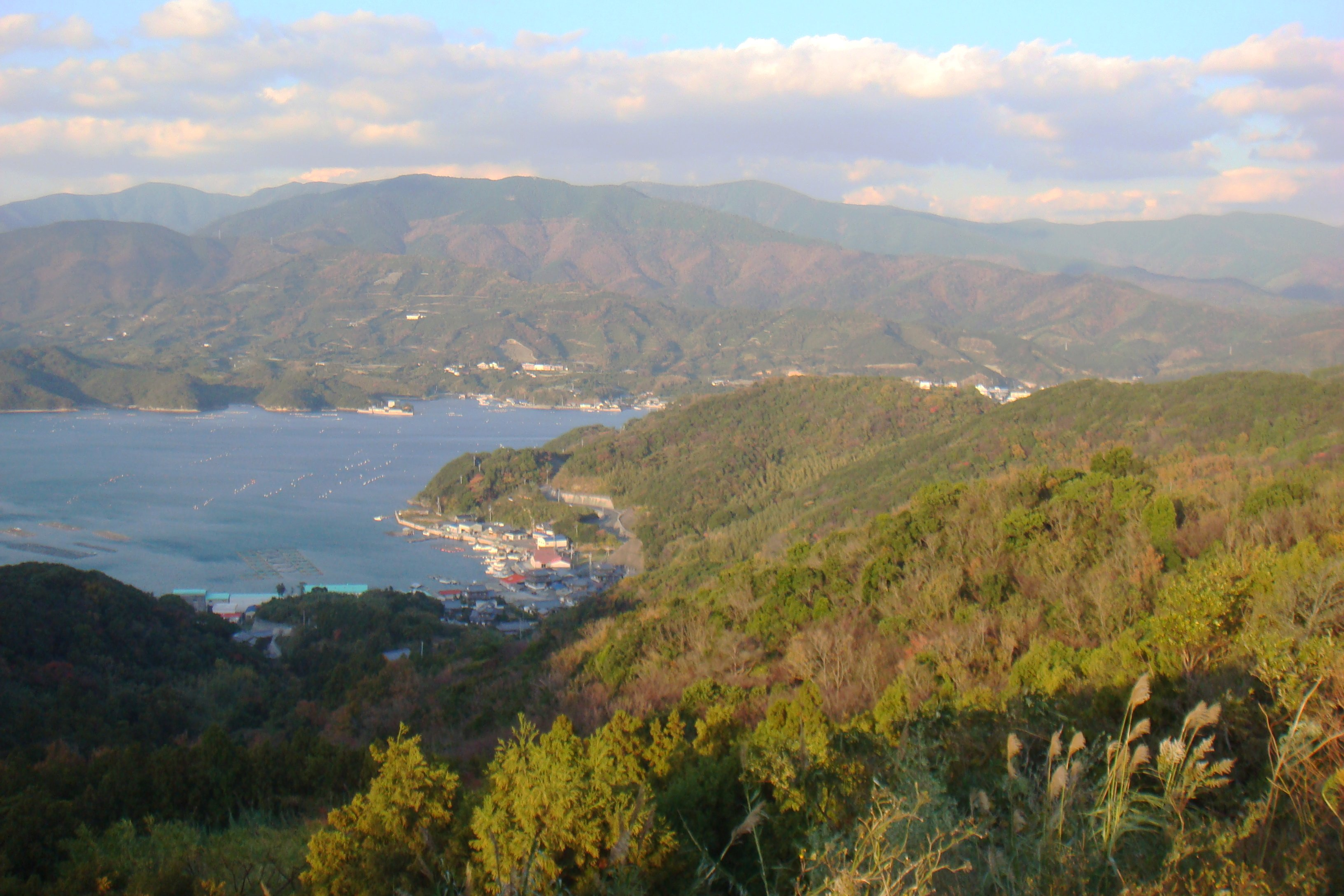
Mountains and sea in Nishiumi.

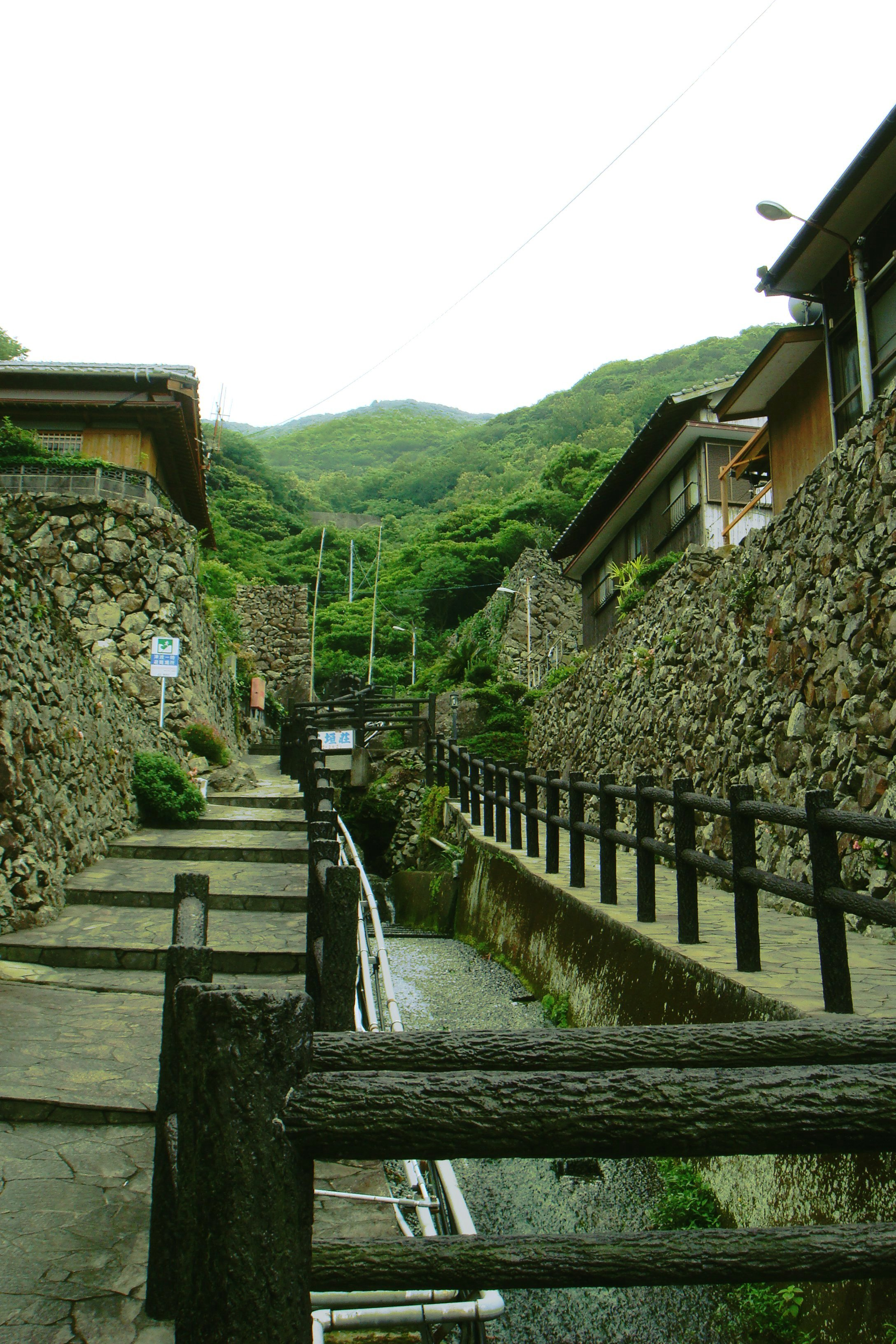
The walls of Sotodomari.
