= Ipponmatsu, Ehime =

Dissolved municipality in Ehime prefecture, Japan

Ipponmatsu (一本松町, Ipponmatsu-chō) was a town located in Minamiuwa District, Ehime Prefecture, Japan.

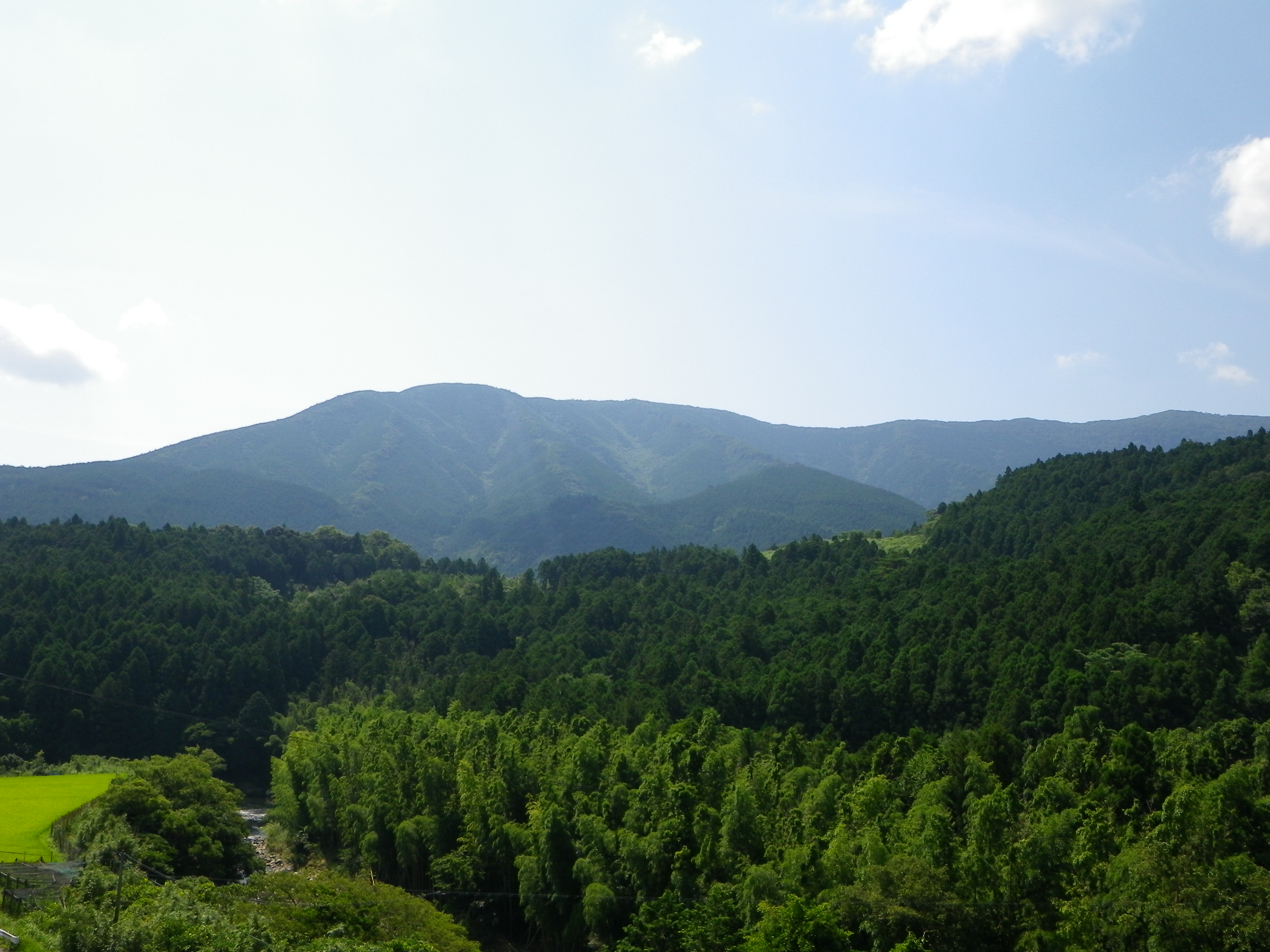
Sasayama (Mount Sasa) as seen from the NNW

As of 2003, the town had an estimated population of 4,204 and a density of 58.15 persons per km^{2}. The total area was 72.29 km^{2}.

On October 1, 2004, Ipponmatsu, along with the towns of Jōhen, Mishō and Nishiumi, and the village of Uchiumi (all from Minamiuwa District), was merged to create the town of Ainan.
