= Jōhen, Ehime =

Dissolved municipality in Ehime prefecture, Japan

Jōhen (城辺町, Jōhen-chō) was a town located in Minamiuwa District, Ehime Prefecture, Japan.

As of 2004, the town of Jōhen had an estimated population of 9,751 and a density of 129.37 persons per km^{2}. The total area was 75.37 km^{2}.

On October 1, 2004, Jōhen, along with the towns of Ipponmatsu, Mishō and Nishiumi, and the village of Uchiumi (all from Minamiuwa District), was merged to create the town of Ainan.
