= Ryoga Ishio =

Japanese footballer

Ryoga Ishio 石尾 崚雅
Personal information
- Full name: Ryoga Ishio
- Date of birth: May 18, 2000 (age 26)
- Place of birth: Osaka, Japan
- Height: 1.83 m (6 ft 0 in)
- Position: Defender

Team information
- Current team: Ehime FC
- Number: 37

Youth career
- 2016–2018: Cerezo Osaka

Senior career*
Years	Team	Apps	(Gls)
2018	Cerezo Osaka U-23	22	(1)
2019–2022	Zweigen Kanazawa	74	(1)
2022–2024	Tokushima Vortis	55	(2)
2025–	Ehime FC	22	(2)
- * Club domestic league appearances and goals as of 17 August 2026

Ryoga Ishio (石尾 崚雅, Ishio Ryōga; born May 18, 2000) is a Japanese football player for Ehime FC.

== Playing career ==
Ishio was born in Osaka Prefecture on May 18, 2000. He joined the J1 League club Cerezo Osaka as part of the youth team in 2018.
