= Vinícius Faria =

Brazilian footballer (born 1999)

Personal information
- Full name: Vinícius Faria dos Santos
- Date of birth: 15 November 1999 (age 26)
- Place of birth: Ferraz de Vasconcelos, Brazil
- Height: 1.84 m (6 ft 0 in)
- Position: Forward

Team information
- Current team: Ferroviária
- Number: 25

Youth career
- –2019: Flamengo

Senior career*
Years	Team	Apps	(Gls)
2019–2022	Nacional-SP	38	(3)
2021	→ Maringá (loan)	10	(0)
2021–2022	→ FC Ryukyu (loan)	5	(0)
2022	Suzuka Point Getters	7	(0)
2023–2025	Cianorte	32	(6)
2023	→ Ituano (loan)	0	(0)
2023	→ Camboriú (loan)	7	(0)
2024	→ Sport Recife (loan)	8	(0)
2025	→ Brusque (loan)	4	(0)
2025	→ Paysandu (loan)	18	(0)
2023–	Ferroviária	6	(1)
- * Club domestic league appearances and goals as of 9 November 2026

Vinícius Faria dos Santos (born 15 November 1999), known as Vinícius Faria, is a Brazilian footballer who plays as a midfielder for Ferroviária.

== Career statistics ==
=== Club ===
As of 8 February 2022.

Club	Season	League			State League		Cup		Other		Total	
Club	Season	Division	Apps	Goals	Apps	Goals	Apps	Goals	Apps	Goals	Apps	Goals
Nacional-SP	2019	–			0	0	0	0	13 (Note: Appearances in the Copa Paulista)	2	13	2
Nacional-SP	2020	–			17 (Note: Appearances in the Campeonato Paulista A3)	1	0	0	5	0	22	1
Nacional-SP	2021	–			3	0	0	0	0	0	3	0
Nacional-SP	2022	–			0	0	0	0	0	0	0	0
Nacional-SP	Total		0	0	20	1	0	0	18	2	38	3
Maringá (loan)	2021	–			10 (Note: Appearances in the Campeonato Paranaense)	0	0	0	0	0	10	0
FC Ryukyu (loan)	2022	J2 League	0	0	–		0	0	0	0	0	0
Career total			0	0	30	1	0	0	18	2	48	3
