= Kanjizai-ji =

Buddhist temple in Ehime Prefecture, Japan

Coordinates: 32°57′52.8″N 132°33′50.6″E

Kanjizaiji (観自在寺) is a Shingon Buddhist temple in Ainan-cho (愛南町), Minamiuwa District, Ehime, Japan. It is number 40 of the 88 temples in the Shikoku Pilgrimage.

Ji (寺) means temple in Japanese. Kanjizai (観自在) is the name of Avalokitesvara (観音, Kannon) which is used in the Heart Sutra (般若心経, Hannya-Shingyo).

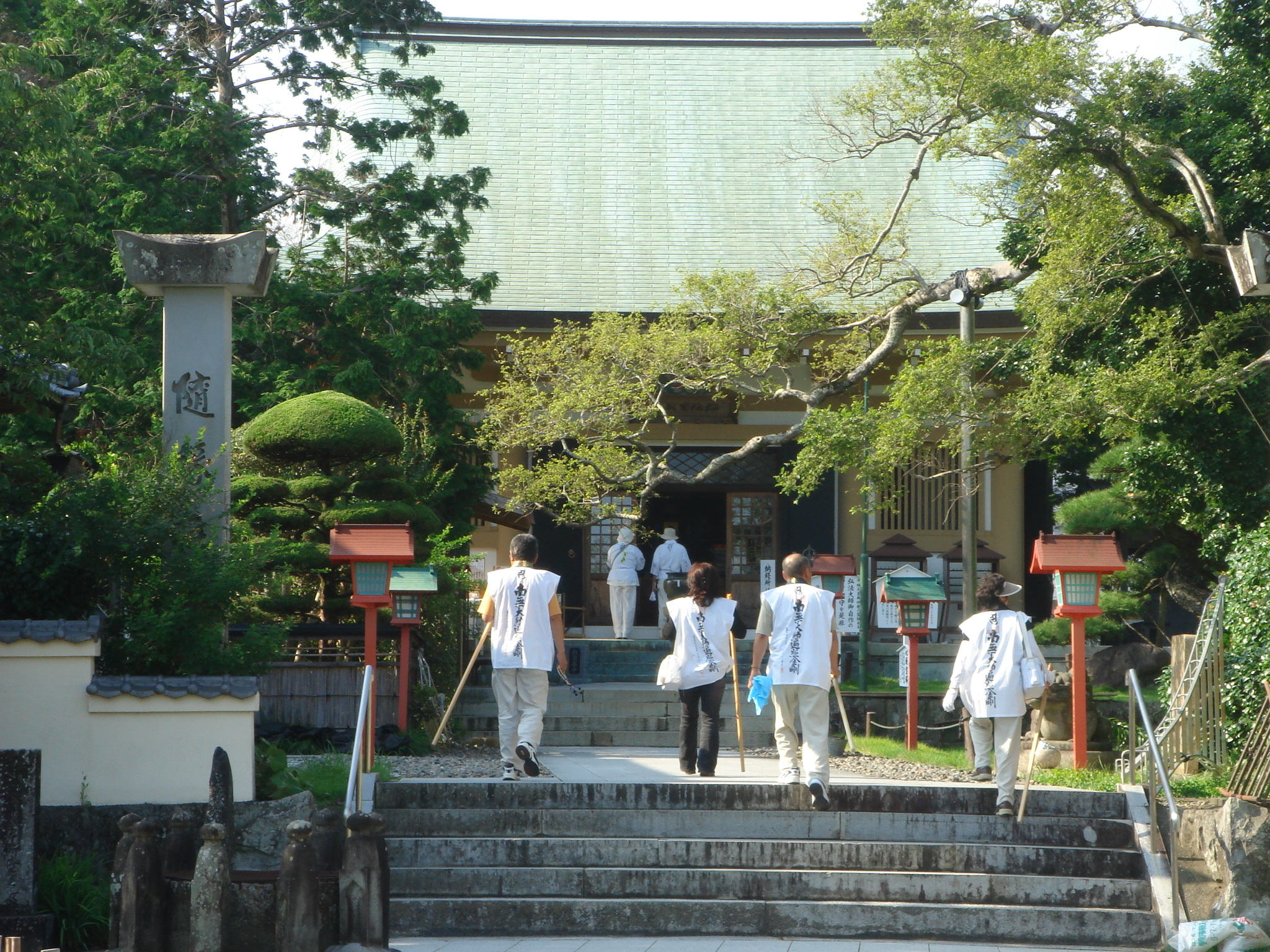
Hondo, the main temple

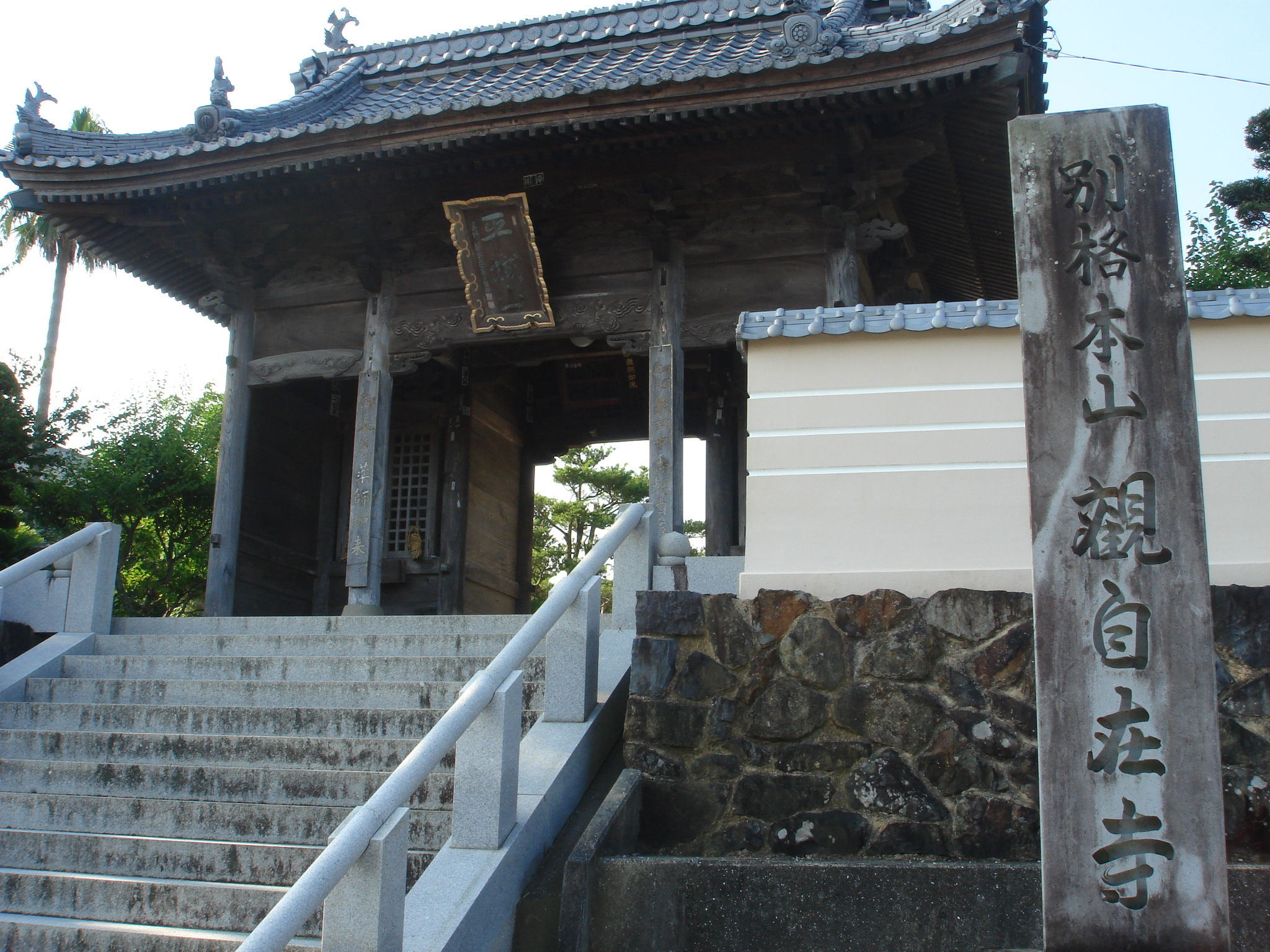
Sanmon, the main gate

The history of the temple is said to date to the year 807 when Kūkai visited the town and made three venerable statues (尊像, sonzou) in honor of Emperor Heizei. At that time he made the honzon of Yakushi Nyorai (本尊薬師如来), Wakihutsu Amida-Nyorai (脇仏阿弥陀如来) and Jūichimen Kanzenon (十一面観世音). These statues were quite precious for all the people from the commonalty to the Emperors. Emperor Heizei and Emperor Saga visited this temple every year. That is why the area around this temple became called Hirajo (平城) whose character means Heizei (平城).

There are some events in each month and sometimes there are so many booths on the street. The small festival is called O-daishi-sama (御大師様) and it is held once around two months to celebrate the tie with Kūkai.

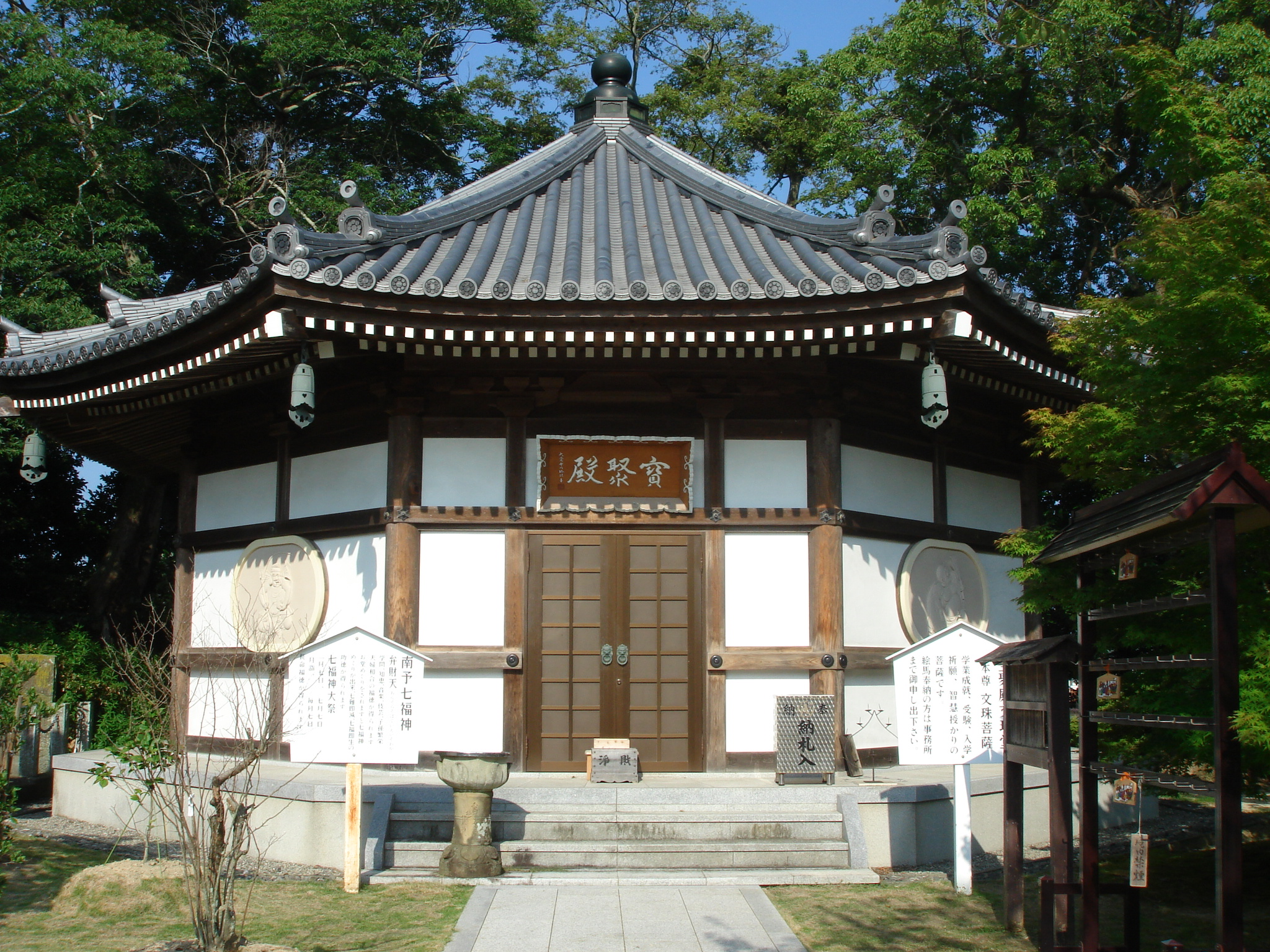
Houshūden-Hakkakudou

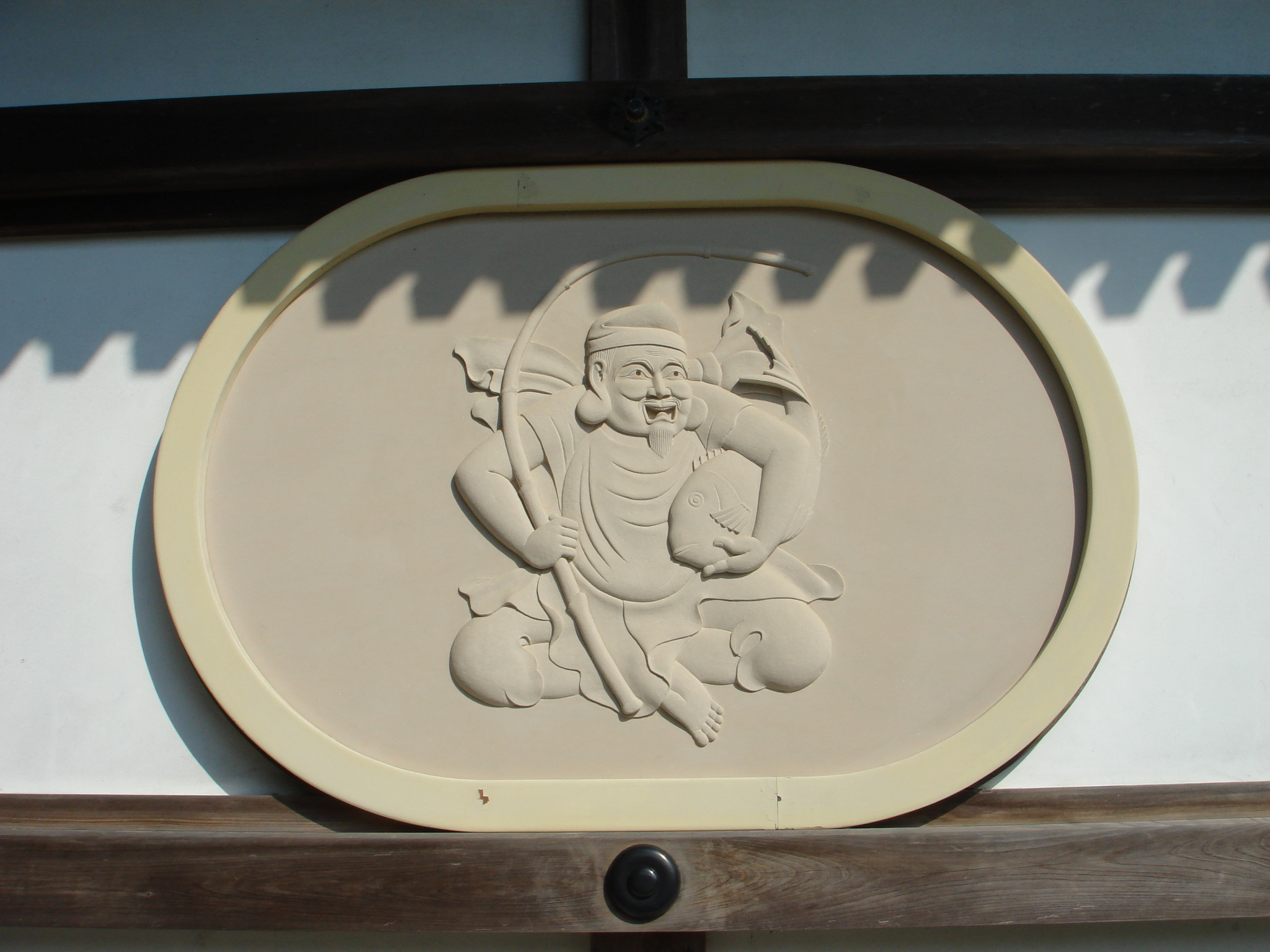
Ebisu

Kanjizaiji has some special features. This temple has one of the Nanyo Seven Gods of Fortune (南予七福神, Nanyo-ShichiFukujin) in Houshūden-Hakkakudou (宝聚殿八角堂). Nanyo (南予) means the southern part of Ehime. The deity of this temple is called Benzaiten (弁財天). She is a deity of treasure and arts. She prevents the natural disasters for people, and brings the rich harvest in the town. And also she brings people good fortune of studying.

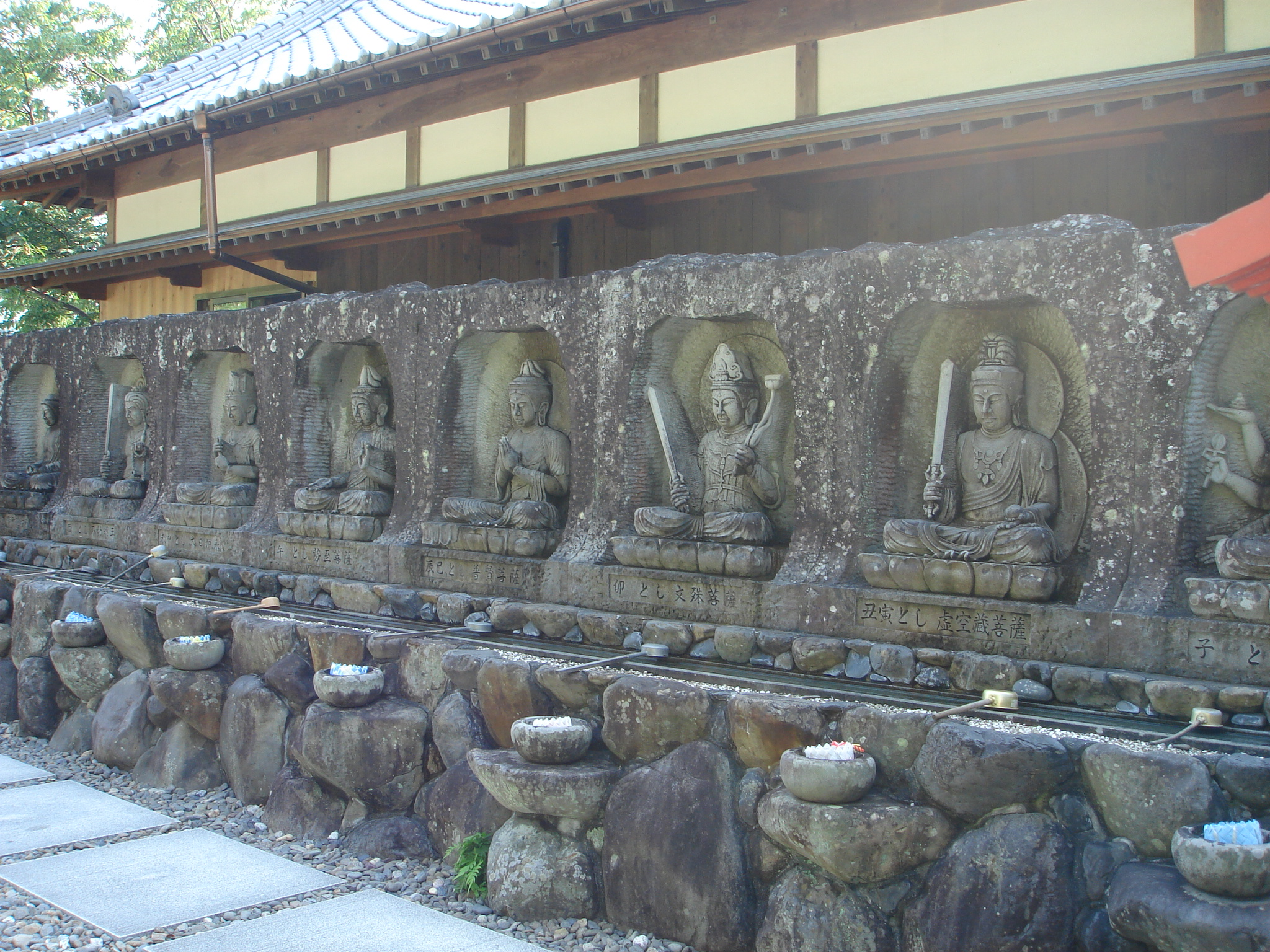
Hattaihutsu-Jūnishi-Honzon

Kanjizaiji has also statues of the twelve Zodiac signs (干支, Eto), and they are called Hattaihutsu-Jūnishi-Honzon (八体仏十二支本尊). The visitors water their own signs' statues and pray to it.
