= Shigenari Izumi =

Japanese footballer and manager

Personal information
- Date of birth: 30 June 1969 (age 57)
- Place of birth: Ainan, Ehime, Japan
- Position: Defender

Youth career
- Minamiuwa HS

Senior career*
Years	Team	Apps	(Gls)
1988–1993	Mazda SC		
1994–1996	Ehime FC		

Managerial career
- 1994–2004: Ehime FC Youth
- 2008–2008: Ehime FC Youth
- 2021: Ehime FC
- * Club domestic league appearances and goals

Shigenari Izumi (和泉 茂徳, Izumi Shigenari; born 30 June 1969) is a Japanese former footballer and former manager of Ehime FC.

== Managerial statistics ==
As of 4 April 2021.

Managerial record by team and tenure
Team	From	To	Record				
Team	From	To	P	W	D	L	Win %
Ehime FC	1 February 2021	4 April 2021	6	0	2	4	0.0
Total			6	0	2	4	0.0
