= Minamiuwa District, Ehime =

District in Ehime Prefecture, Japan

Coordinates: 32.994°N 132.584°E

Minamiuwa (南宇和郡, Minamiuwa-gun) is a district located in Ehime Prefecture, Japan.

As of 2004, the estimated population is 28,100 and the total area is 239.54 km^{2}.

The district includes one town.

- Ainan

== History ==
- 1878 — The Minamiuwa District broke off from the Uwa District through Meiji era land reforms. (7 villages)
- February 11, 1923 — The village of Mishō gained town status. (1 town, 6 villages)
- February 11, 1923 — The village of Jōhen gained town status. (2 towns, 5 villages)
- November 3, 1948 — The village of Uchiumi broke up into Uchiumi and Minamiuchiumi, with some parts merging into Jōhen. (2 towns, 6 villages)
- April 1, 1952 — The village of Higashisotoumi gained town status. (3 towns, 5 villages)
- September 1, 1952 — The village of Midorisōzu merged into the town of Jōhen. (3 towns, 4 villages)
- October 1, 1952 — The village of Nishisotoumi was renamed and gained town status to become the town of Nishiumi. (4 towns, 3 villages)
- September 21, 1956 — The town of Higashisotoumi merged into the town of Jōhen. (3 towns, 3 villages)
- September 30, 1956 — The village of Minamiuchiumi merged into the town of Mishō. (3 towns, 2 villages)
- January 1, 1962 — The village of Ipponmatsu gained town status. (4 towns, 1 village)
- October 1, 2004 — The towns of Ipponmatsu, Mishō, Jōhen and Nishiumi, and the village of Uchiumi merged to form the new town of Ainan. (1 town)
