= Ehime Prefectural Matsuyama Central Senior High School =

Ehime Prefectural Matsuyama Central Senior High School (Ehime Prefectural Matsuyama Chuo High School)
- 愛媛県立松山中央高等学校
- Ehime Kenritsu Matsuyama Chūō Kōtōgakkō
- Location in Ehime Prefecture

Location
- 1220 Ido-machi, Matsuyama-shi, Ehime-ken; 791–1114; Japan; 33°48′00″N 132°46′12″E

Information
- Other names: Ehime Prefectural Matsuyama Central High School; Ehime Prefectural Matsuyama Chuo High School (Ehime Prefectural Matsuyama Chūō High School); Ehime Prefectural Matsuyama Chuo Senior High School (Ehime Prefectural Matsuyama Chūō Senior High School)
- Type: Public high school ( Ehime Prefectural high school )
- Motto: CHALLENGE, Energetic, Noble, Thoughtful, Righteous, Ambitious, Liberal (挑戦しよう，活気に満ち，気高く，思慮深い生活に，そして正義を愛し，大志を抱き，教養を身につけよう)
- Established: 26 December 1986; 39 years ago
- School district: Chūyo, Ehime
- Authorizer: Ehime Prefecture
- Superintendent: Ehime Prefectural Board of Education (愛媛県教育委員会, Ehime Ken Kyōiku Iinkai)
- School code: 38155B (High School Code for the National Center for University Entrance Examinations)
- Principal: UEDA, Toshihiro (上田 敏博 / Since April 2018)
- Grades: 10–12 (Senior High years 1st–3rd)
- Gender: Coeducational
- Age: 15 years old to 18 years old
- Enrollment: 360 per grade (Admission quota)
- Classes: 27 Classes (9 classes per grade)
- Average class size: 40 people
- Education system: Full-time high school
- Language: Japanese; Contemporary Japanese Language; Classics (Classical Japanese language and Kanbun); English
- Hours in school day: 7 hours or 6 hours
- Campus: Suburban
- Campus size: 44,743m^{2} (0.044743km^{2})
- Student Union/Association: Student council; Future Homemakers club
- Slogan: "JIRITSU – Forging our own Future – " (30th Anniversary Theme)
- Song: Song of Ehime Prefectural Matsuyama Central Senior High School (Words by Song Committee of Matsuyama Central Senior High School / Music by TAKAHASHI, Sadamichi); Founding memorial Hymn "NOZOMI" (Created by the first student)
- Fight song: Chuo Mambo (中央マンボ, Chūō Mambo)
- Mascot: Challenge Bird "KAWAMIN" (チャレンジバード 「カワみん」, Charenji Bādo "Kawamin") (Alcedo atthis)
- Nickname: MCHS; MCH; Matsuyama Chuo (松山中央, Matsuyama Chūō)
- Newspaper: Official Newspaper; Matsuyama Central Senior High School Press (松山中央高校通信, Matsuyama Chūō Kōkō Tsūshin); Matsuyama Central Senior High School newspaper (松山中央高校新聞, Matsuyama Chūō Kōkō Shinbun)
- Yearbook: Student Journal "Chuo" (生徒会誌「中央」, Seitokaishi "Chūō")
- Annual tuition: ¥118,800 (Students can receive scholarships if they meet the Requirements)
- Graduates (March 2018): 11,403
- Nobel laureates: None (As of 2018)
- Website: Ehime Prefectural Matsuyama Central Senior High School Official website (Japanese); Ehime Prefectural Matsuyama Central Senior High School Official Emergency Alert Information Announcement site (Japanese)

Ehime Prefectural Matsuyama Central Senior High School (愛媛県立松山中央高等学校, Ehime Kenritsu Matsuyama Chūō Kōtōgakkō), abbreviated as Matsuyama Chuo (松山中央, Matsuyama Chūō) or MCHS or MCH, is a public high school located in Ido-machi, Matsuyama, Ehime, Shikoku, Japan established in 1986 and opened in 1987 as the newest prefectural academic high school in Ehime Prefecture.

Ehime Prefectural Matsuyama Central Senior High School has produced a large number of alumni, and up to March 2018 (1st to 29th generation students) graduates are 11,403. The school has a capacity of 360 students per grade, but in April 2018, the shortage of students occurred and 350 new students.

== Overview ==
Ehime Prefectural Matsuyama Central Senior High School was established in 1986 and opened in 1987 as a liberal academic school by the Ehime Prefecture government, is located in south Matsuyama facing the north side of the Shigenobu River (重信川, Shigenobu Gawa). Moreover, it enters the area of Tobe-chō, Masaki-chō, and Iyo-shi when crossing the Shigenobu River which is adjacent to the school.

Ehime Prefectural Matsuyama Central Senior High School is the newest high school in Ehime and is built by local government according to expectations of the inhabitants. On establishing this school, the Ehime Prefectural Board of Education, agreed to make a school producing competent persons who could make sound contributions to 21st century world. This school has set up the educational principles to promote education which develops each student's personality through contact with teachers and other students.

== Academics ==
Ehime Prefectural Matsuyama Central Senior High School provides lessons in collaboration with research and development institutes such as Ehime University (愛媛大学, Ehime Daigaku; or Aidai 愛大 Aidai) from the 1st year students immediately after enrollment.

=== Courses ===
Ehime Prefectural Matsuyama Central Senior High School offers courses in "Science and Mathematics", "Health care and Nursing", "Humanities", "English", and a range of electives.

== History ==
- On 26 December 1986, the Ehime Prefectural Matsuyama Central Senior High School was established. (Ehime Prefectural School Establishment Ordinance promulgated)
- On 1 April 1987, opened and the first entrance ceremony was held.
- In fiscal 2006, the Ehime Prefectural Matsuyama Central Senior High School was designated as Super English Language High School (SELHi) of the Ministry of Education, Culture, Sports, Science and Technology (MEXT). (Only for 3 years)
- In 2016, 30th anniversary of the founding.
- In fiscal 2017, the Ehime Prefectural Matsuyama Central Senior High School received a commendation for the safety of schools from Ministry of Education, Culture, Sports, Science and Technology (MEXT).

== Facilities ==
=== Campus buildings ===
- Main building (Northeast)
- Ordinary school building (Halfway between Main building and Special building)
- Special building (Southwest)

=== Other facilities ===
- Bicycle parking space
- Garbage collection place
- Machine chamber
- Garden
- Gymnasium
- Martial art gym
- Swimming pool (Clubroom)
- Clubhouse
- Lavatory
- Athletic ground
- Tennis court
- Handball court

== Nearby facilities ==
- Matsuyama Interchange (Matsuyama Expressway)
- National Route 33
- Matsuyama Soto Kanjo Road
- Shikoku Railway Company (JR Shikoku) Ichitsubo Station
- Matsuyama Central Park
  - Ehime Prefectural Budokan
  - Matsuyama Keirin Track (Setokaze Bank)
  - Matsuyama Central Park Pool (Aqua Pallet Matsuyama)
  - Sports field
  - Sports arena
  - Tennis court
  - Matsuyama Central Park Baseball Stadium (Botchan Stadium)
  - Sub-stadium (Madonna Stadium)
- Ehime Prefectural Police Matsuyama South police station
- Iyozu Hikonomito Shrine (Tsubaki Shrine)

== School events ==
- First term
  - Kite festival (May)
  - English Day (June)
- Third term
  - CENTRAL MARATHON (February)

=== Central Marathon ===
Since the school was established, the first and second graders who have been using the embankment of the Shigenobu River are all participating in the marathon race. The boys run the 21.0975 km half marathon and the girls are 10 km away. In the "CENTRAL MARATHON 2018", which was held in February 2018, the student's completion rate was 100% in the first year and 99.4% for the second year students.

== School safety ==
In fiscal 2017, the high school received a commendation for the safety of schools from Ministry of Education, Culture, Sports, Science and Technology (MEXT).

== Emergency response ==
In July 2018, Japan was severely damaged by "Heavy rain in July Heisei 30". Therefore, when the Japan Meteorological Agency (JMA) issued the flood warning to Matsuyama-shi or the Student's living area, the Ehime Prefectural Matsuyama Central Senior High School restricts to attending the high school.

== Notable teachers and alumni ==
- Aono Daisuke (AONO, Daisuke), Ehime FC head coach / Former Japanese football player
- Masutani Kosuke (MASUTANI, Kōsuke), Japanese football player who played in Japan Professional Football League (J.League) for the FC Ryukyu
- Yamamura Michinao (YAMAMURA, Michinao), Japanese former professional baseball Pitcher who played in Nippon Professional Baseball for the Fukuoka SoftBank Hawks / Physical therapist

== Access to Ehime Prefectural Matsuyama Central Senior High School ==
=== Railways ===
- Shikoku Railway Company (JR Shikoku) operate limited express train services between Honshu and Shikoku. Yosan Line train (Shiokaze, Ishizuchi, Morning Express Matsuyama, Midnight Express Matsuyama, Uwakai) connects Okayama or Takamatsu to Utazu, Tadotsu, Niihama, Iyo-saijō, Imabari, Matsuyama and Uwajima (All trains stop at Matsuyama station). By the way, Okayama Station is the stop station of the Sanyo Shinkansen of West Japan Railway Company (JR-West).
  - Ehime Prefectural Matsuyama Central Senior High School is about a 35-minute walk from the JR Shikoku Ichitsubo Station. However, Ichitsubo Station does not correspond to the boarding of the limited express train. Therefore, it is recommended to change from Matsuyama station to a regular train.
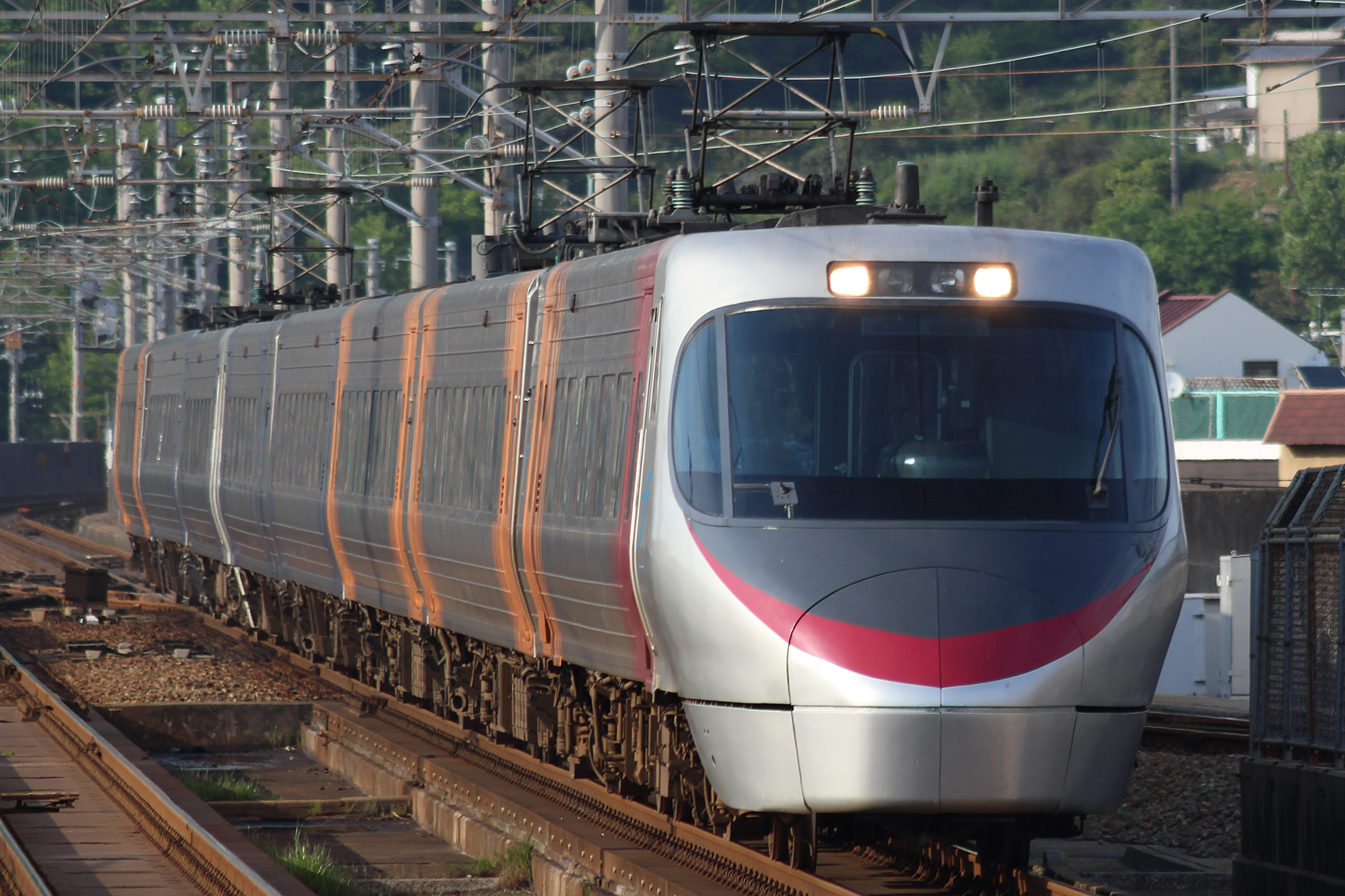
JR Shikoku 8000 series (Shiokaze, Ishizuchi, Morning Express Matsuyama, Midnight Express Matsuyama)

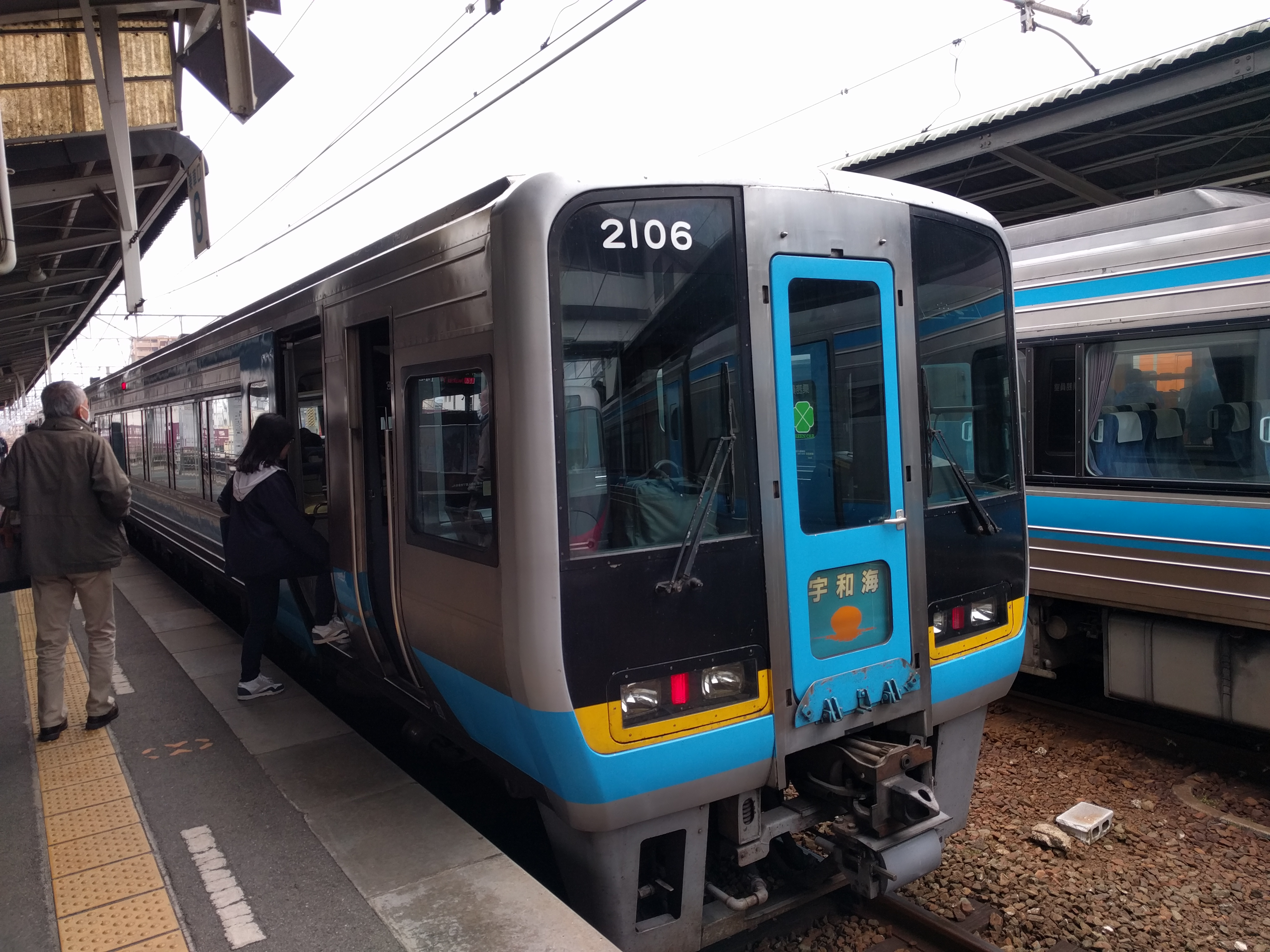
JR Shikoku 2000 series (Uwakai)

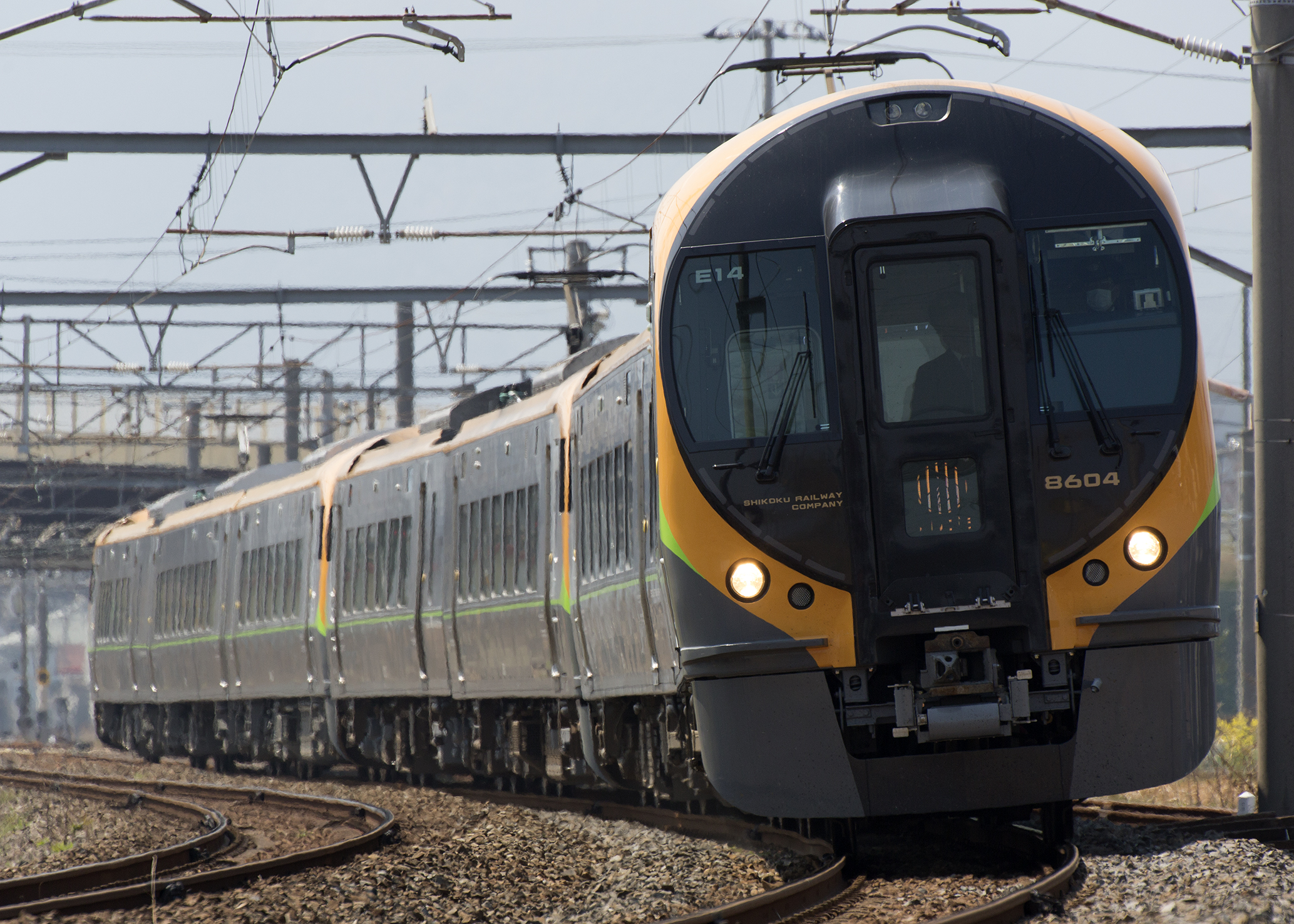
JR Shikoku 8600 series (Shiokaze, Ishizuchi)

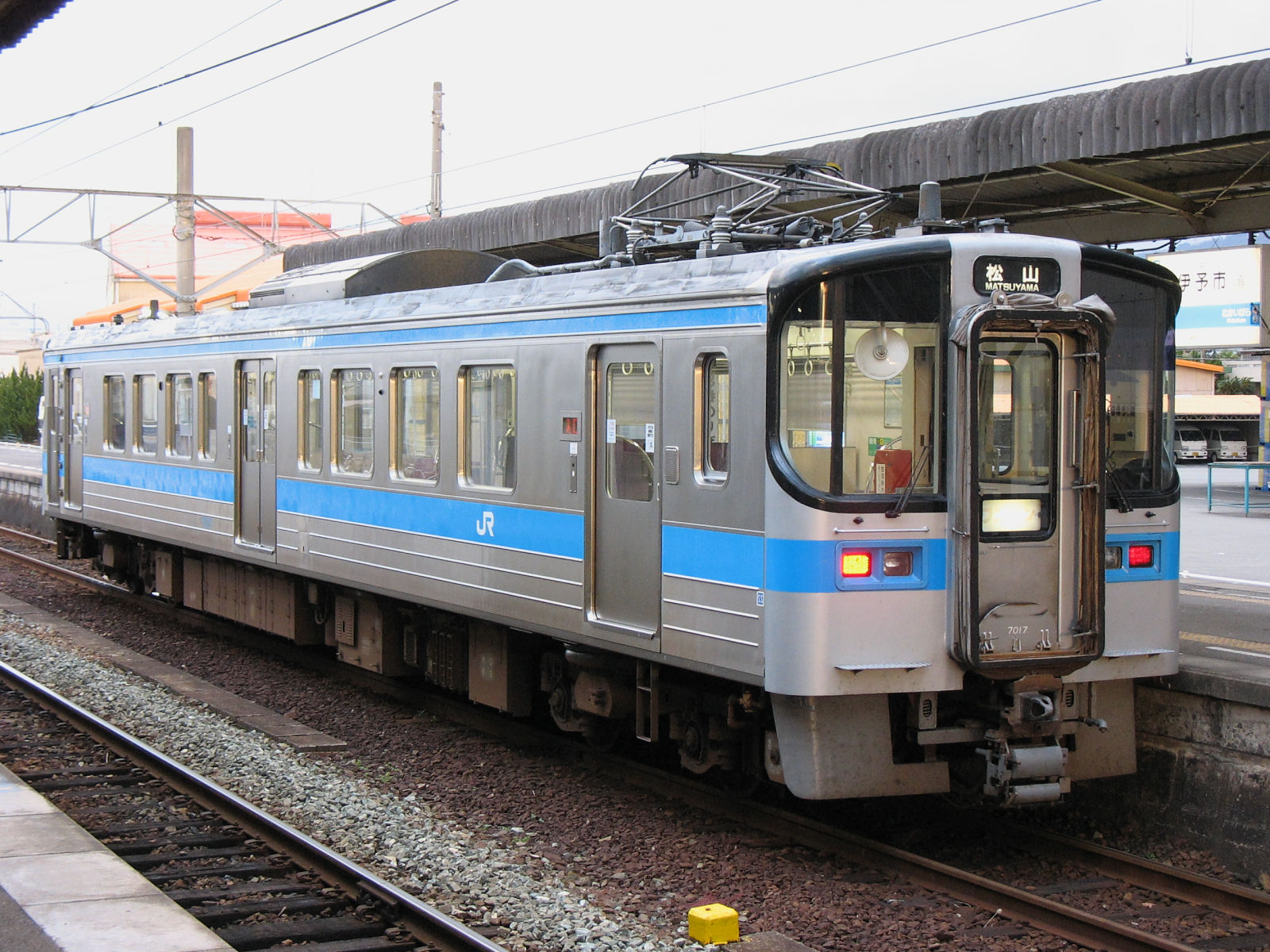
JR Shikoku 7000 series (Regular train)

=== Bus transportation ===
- Iyo Railway Co., Ltd. (Iyotetsu) services are available between Matsuyama Airport and Matsuyama City Station, Matsuyama City Station and other places around Ehime.
  - Ehime Prefectural Matsuyama Central Senior High School is about a 30-minute walk from the Iyo Railway Co., Ltd. Tobe Line Minamiido Station.
  - Ehime Prefectural Matsuyama Central Senior High School is about a 20-minute walk from the Iyo Railway Co., Ltd. Kitaiyo Line Minamifurukawa Station.
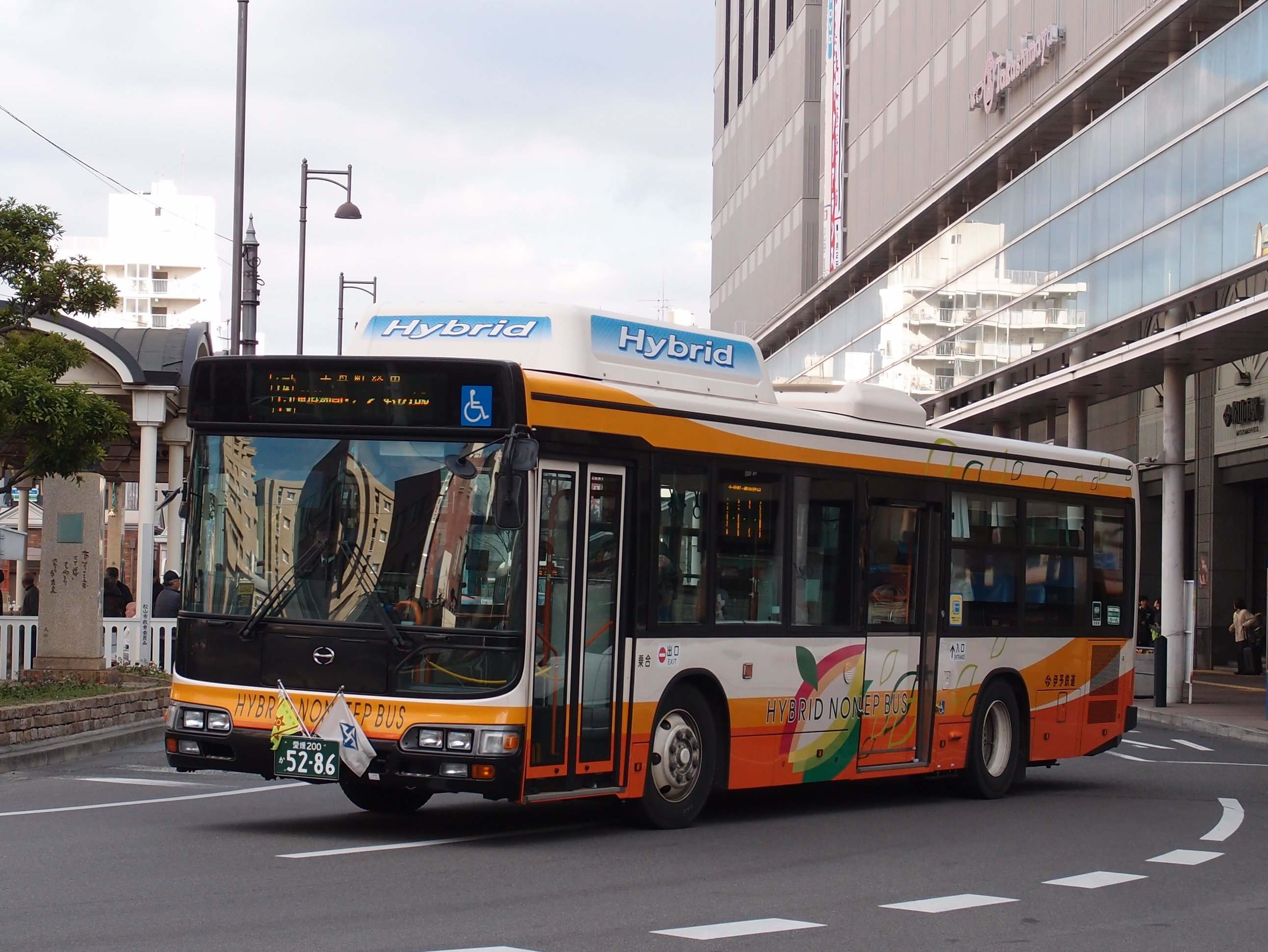
Iyotetsu Bus (Hino Blue Ribbon Hybrid)

=== Expressway ===
- Matsuyama Expressway connects Shikokuchūō with Matsuyama and Uwajima.
  - Ehime Prefectural Matsuyama Central Senior High School is near Matsuyama Interchange of Matsuyama Expressway.
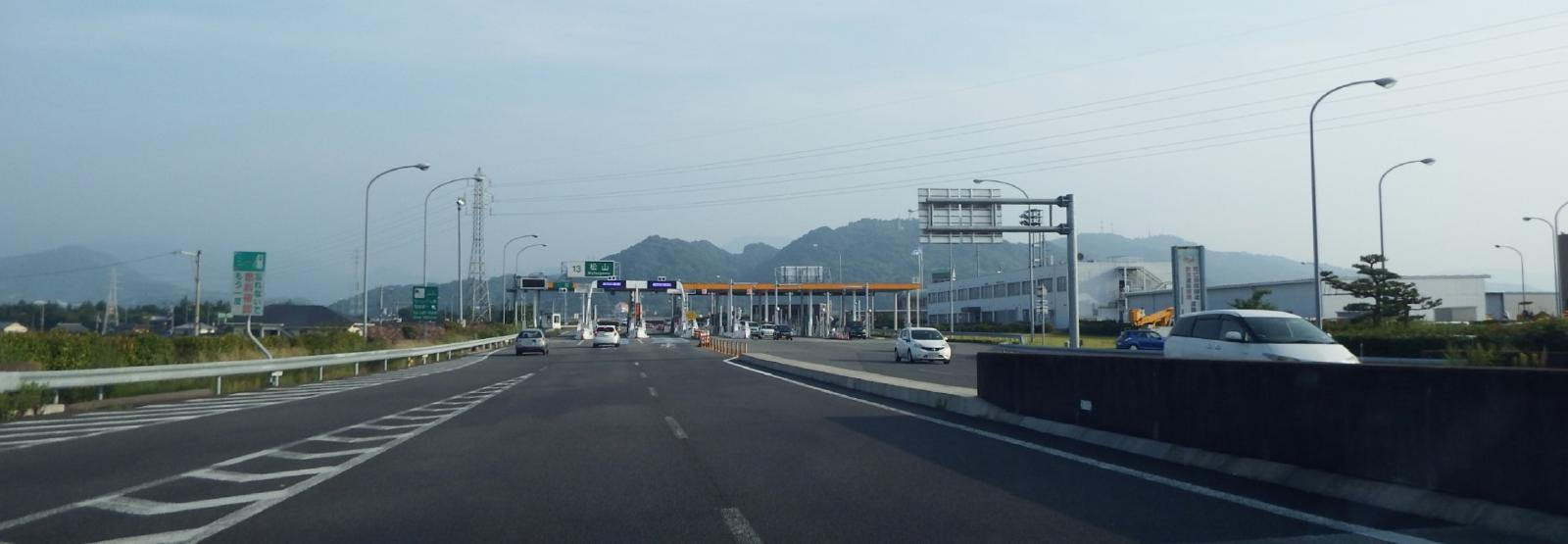
Matsuyama Interchange

== Extracurriculars ==
=== Students' union ===
- Student council
- Future Homemakers club (Future Homemakers of Japan)

=== Extracurricular activity ===
==== Culture club ====
- School band
- Choir
- Art
- Literature
- Broadcasting
- Photography
- Birdwatching
- Information
- Interact
- Japanese tea ceremony
- Ikebana
- Calligraphy
- Volunteering
- Local history
- Biology
- Chemistry
- Competitive karuta
- Go･Shogi
- Cooking
- Horticulture
- Handicraft
- Newspaper (Suspended)
- Physics (Suspended)
- Mathematics (Suspended)

==== Sports club ====
- Sport of athletics
- Swimming
- Basketball
- Volleyball
- Badminton
- Table tennis
- Tennis
- Handball
- Association football
- Softball
- Judo
- Kendo
- Mountaineering
- Dance
- Hockey
- Karate
- Baseball
