= Takihama Station =

Railway station in Niihama, Ehime Prefecture, Japan

Y28 Takihama Station 多喜浜駅
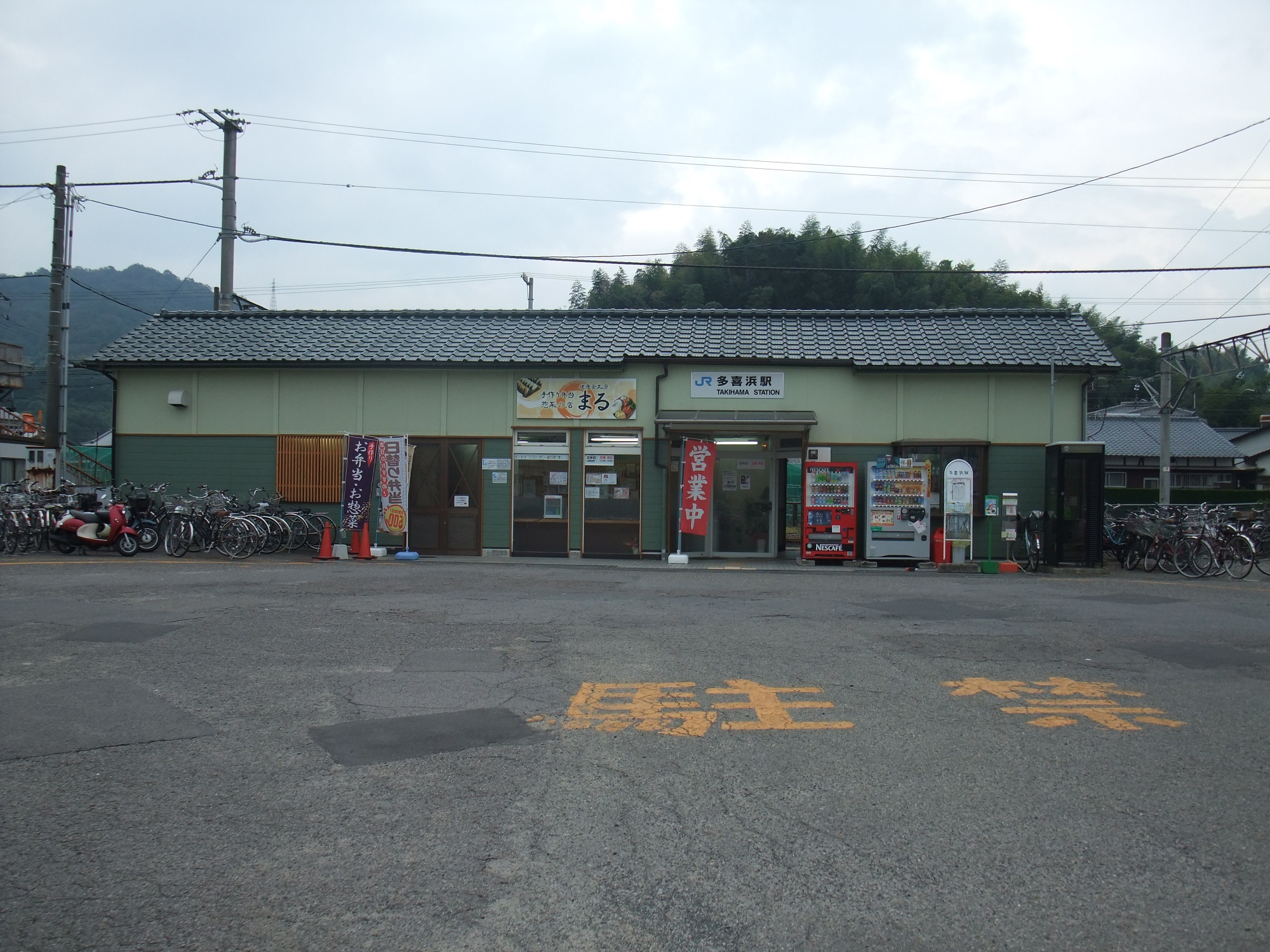
- Takihama Station in 2014

General information
- Location: 2-2 Matano, Niihama-shi, Ehime-ken 792-0882; Japan
- Coordinates: 33°58′14″N 133°19′27″E
- Operator: JR Shikoku
- Line: ■ Yosan Line
- Distance: 99.4 km from Takamatsu
- Platforms: 1 island platform
- Tracks: 2 + several sidings

Construction
- Structure type: At grade
- Accessible: No - island platform accessed by footbridge

Other information
- Status: Unstaffed
- Station code: Y28

History
- Opened: 21 June 1921

Passengers
- FY2019: 156
Location
- Location within Ehime Prefecture Location within Japan

Takihama Station (多喜浜駅, Takihama-eki) is a passenger railway station located in the city of Niihama, Ehime Prefecture, Japan. It is operated by JR Shikoku and has the station number "Y28".

== Lines ==
Takihama Station is served by the JR Shikoku Yosan Line and is located 99.4 km from the beginning of the line at Takamatsu. Yosan line local, Rapid Sunport, and Nanpū Relay services stop at the station.

== Layout ==
The station, which is unstaffed, consists of an island platform serving two tracks. The station building houses a waiting room and a shop. A footbridge leads to the island platform where there is an enclosed shelter for waiting passengers. There is a passing siding to the north of the island platform (between the station building and the island platform) and two dead-end sidings which branch off the main tracks.

== Adjacent stations ==
«	Service	»
Yosan Line
Sekigawa	Rapid Sunport	Niihama
Sekigawa	Nanpū Relay	Niihama
Sekigawa	Local	Niihama

== History ==
Takihama Station opened on 21 June 1921 as an intermediate stop on the then Sanuki Line which had been extended westwards from Iyo-Doi to Iyo-Saijo. At that time the station was operated by Japanese Government Railways, later becoming Japanese National Railways (JNR). With the privatization of JNR on 1 April 1987, control of the station passed to JR Shikoku.

== Surrounding area ==
- Niihama City Hall Kawahigashi Branch
- Niihama Municipal Kamisato Elementary School
- Niihama Municipal Kawahigashi Junior High School

== See also ==
- List of railway stations in Japan
