= Kawanoe Station =

Railway station in Shikokuchūō, Ehime Prefecture, Japan

Y22 Kawanoe Station 川之江駅
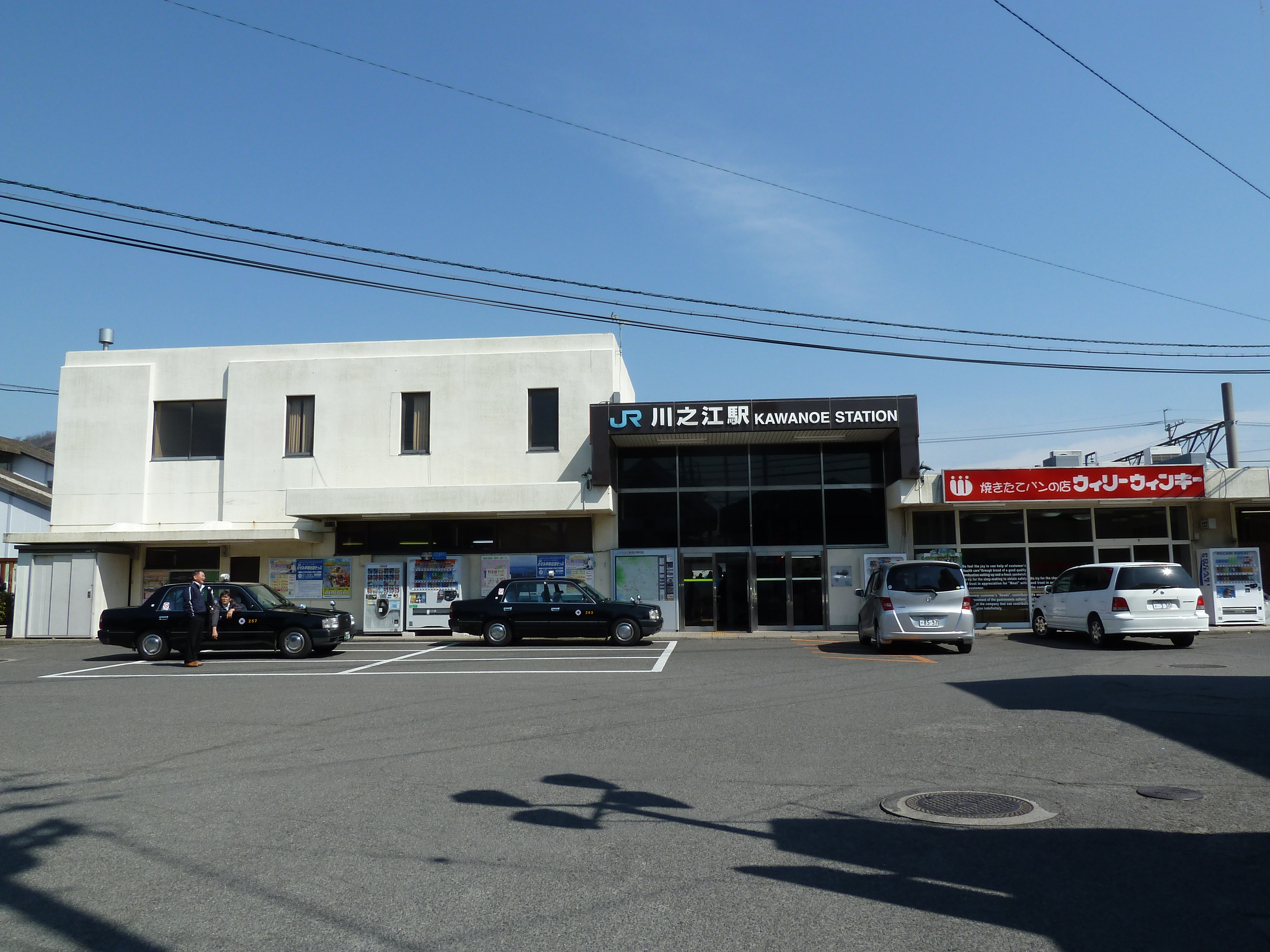
- Kawanoe Station in 2011

General information
- Location: Japan
- Coordinates: 34°00′55″N 133°34′35″E
- Operator: JR Shikoku
- Line: ■ Yosan Line
- Distance: 72.2 km from Takamatsu
- Platforms: 1 island platform
- Tracks: 2 + several sidings and passing loops

Construction
- Structure type: At grade
- Parking: Available
- Accessible: No - footbridge needed to access island platform

Other information
- Status: Staffed - JR ticket window (Midori no Madoguchi)
- Station code: Y22
- Website: Official website

History
- Opened: 1 April 1916

Passengers
- FY2019: 1250
Location
- Location within Ehime Prefecture Location within Japan

Kawanoe Station (川之江駅, Kawanoe-eki) is a passenger railway station located in the city of Shikokuchūō, Ehime Prefecture, Japan. It is operated by JR Shikoku and has the station number "Y22".

== Lines ==
Kawanoe Station is served by the JR Shikoku Yosan Line and is located 72.2 km from the beginning of the line at Takamatsu. Yosan line local, Rapid Sunport, and Nanpū Relay services stop at the station.

The following JR Shikoku limited express services also stop at the station:

- Shiokaze - from Okayama to Matsuyama and Uwajima
- Ishizuchi - from Matsuyama to Takamatsu and Uwajima
- Midnight Express Takamatsu - from Takamatsu to Iyo-Saijo
- Morning Express Takamatsu - from Iyo-Saijo to Takamatsu

== Layout ==
The station consists of an island platform serving two tracks. A station building houses a waiting room, shops and a JR ticket window (with a Midori no Madoguchi facility). Access to the island platform is by means of a footbridge. Various sidings and passing loops branch off the main tracks on both sides of the island platform.

== Adjacent stations ==
«	Service	»
JR Limited Express Services
Kan'onji	Shiokaze	Iyo-Mishima
Kan'onji	Ishizuchi	Iyo-Mishima
Kan'onji	Midnight Express Takamatsu	Iyo-Mishima
Kan'onji	Morning Express Takamatsu	Iyo-Mishima
Yosan Line
Minoura	Rapid Sunport	Iyo-Mishima
Minoura	Nanpū Relay	Iyo-Mishima
Minoura	Local	Iyo-Mishima

== History ==
Kawanoe Station opened on 1 April 1916 as the terminus of the then Sanuki Line which had been extended westwards from Kan'onji. It became a through-station on 16 September 1917 when the line was further extended to Iyo-Mishima. At that time the station was operated by Japanese Government Railways, later becoming Japanese National Railways (JNR). With the privatization of JNR on 1 April 1987, control of the station passed to JR Shikoku.

== Surrounding area ==
- Kawanoe Port
- Kawanoe Castle
- Ehime Prefectural Kawanoe High School

== See also ==
- List of railway stations in Japan
