= Mishima High School =

Mishima High School may refer to:

- Mishima High School, Ehime, Japan
- Mishima High School (Osaka Prefecture), Japan, operated by the Osaka Prefectural Board of Education
- Mishima High School (Nippon University), a high school belonging to Nippon University, located in Shizuoka, Japan
- Mishima Polytechnical School, a fictional high school that appears in the Tekken series of video games
