= Iyo-Mishima Station =

Railway station in Shikokuchūō, Ehime Prefecture, Japan

Y23 Iyo-Mishima Station 伊予三島駅
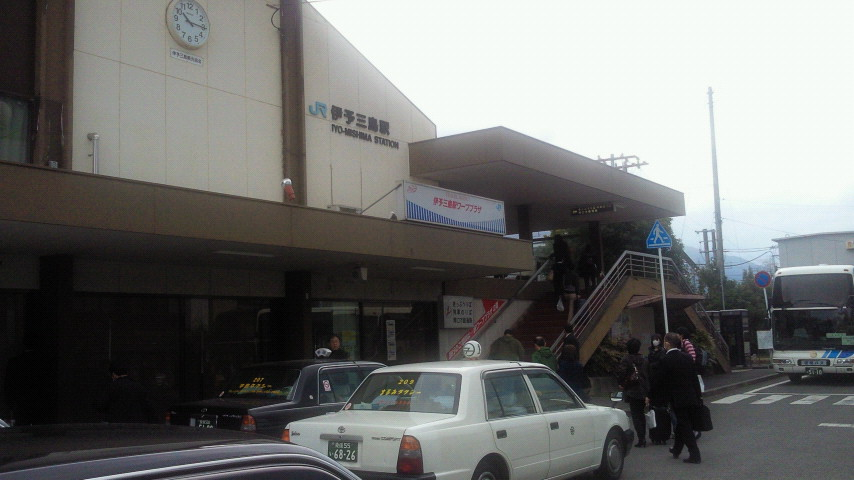
- The entrance of Iyo-Mishima Station in 2013. The station facilities are up the steps.

General information
- Location: 3-1 Mishimachūō, Shikokuchūō-shi, Ehime-ken 799-0405; Japan
- Coordinates: 33°58′46″N 133°32′32″E
- Operator: JR Shikoku
- Line: ■ Yosan Line
- Distance: 77.6 km from Takamatsu
- Platforms: 1 side + 1 island platforms
- Tracks: 3 + 1 passing loop

Construction
- Structure type: At grade (platforms), elevated (station building)
- Parking: Available
- Accessible: No - station facilities on a bridge

Other information
- Status: Staffed -(Midori no Madoguchi)
- Station code: Y23
- Website: Official website

History
- Opened: 16 September 1917

Passengers
- FY2019: 1970
Location
- Location within Ehime Prefecture Location within Japan

Iyo-Mishima Station (伊予三島駅, Iyo-Mishima-eki) is a passenger railway station located in the city of Shikokuchūō, Ehime Prefecture, Japan. It is operated by JR Shikoku and has the station number "Y23".

== Lines ==
Iyo-Mishima Station is served by the JR Shikoku Yosan Line and is located 77.6 km from the beginning of the line at Takamatsu. Yosan line local, Rapid Sunport, and Nanpū Relay services stop at the station.

The following JR Shikoku limited express services also stop at the station:

- Shiokaze - from Okayama to Matsuyama and Uwajima
- Ishizuchi - from Matsuyama to Takamatsu and Uwajima
- Midnight Express Takamatsu - from Takamatsu to Iyo-Saijo
- Morning Express Takamatsu - from Iyo-Saijo to Takamatsu

== Layout ==
The station consists of an island platform and a side platform serving three tracks. The present station building, completed in 1975 is a hashigami (橋上) structure where passenger facilities are located on a bridge which spans the tracks. Besides providing access to all the platforms, the enclosed bridge structure houses the ticket gates, a waiting room, shops, a JR Midori no Madoguchi ticket window and a JR Travel Centre (Warp Plaza). A passing loop runs on the side of platform/track 1. In addition, a large freight yard is located just to the east of the station which is leased by a paper manufacturer.

== Adjacent stations ==
«	Service	»
JR Limited Express Services
Kawanoe	Shiokaze	Niihama
Kawanoe	Ishizuchi	Niihama
Kawanoe	Midnight Express Takamatsu	Niihama
Kawanoe	Morning Express Takamatsu	Niihama
Yosan Line
Kawanoe	Rapid Sunport	Iyo-Sangawa
Kawanoe	Nanpū Relay	Iyo-Sangawa
Kawanoe	Local	Iyo-Sangawa

== History ==
Iyo-Mishima Station opened on 16 September 1917 as the terminus of the then Sanuki Line which had been extended westwards from Kawanoe. It became a through-station on 1 September 1919 when the line was further extended to Iyo-Doi. At that time the station was operated by Japanese Government Railways, later becoming Japanese National Railways (JNR). With the privatization of JNR on 1 April 1987, control of the station passed to JR Shikoku and JR Freight.

== Surrounding area ==
- Shikokuchuo City Hall (about 1km)
- Shikokuchuo Municipal Mishima Elementary School
- Ehime Prefectural Mishima High School

== See also ==
- List of railway stations in Japan
