= Sekigawa Station =

Railway station in Shikokuchūō, Ehime Prefecture, Japan

Y27 Sekigawa Station 関川駅
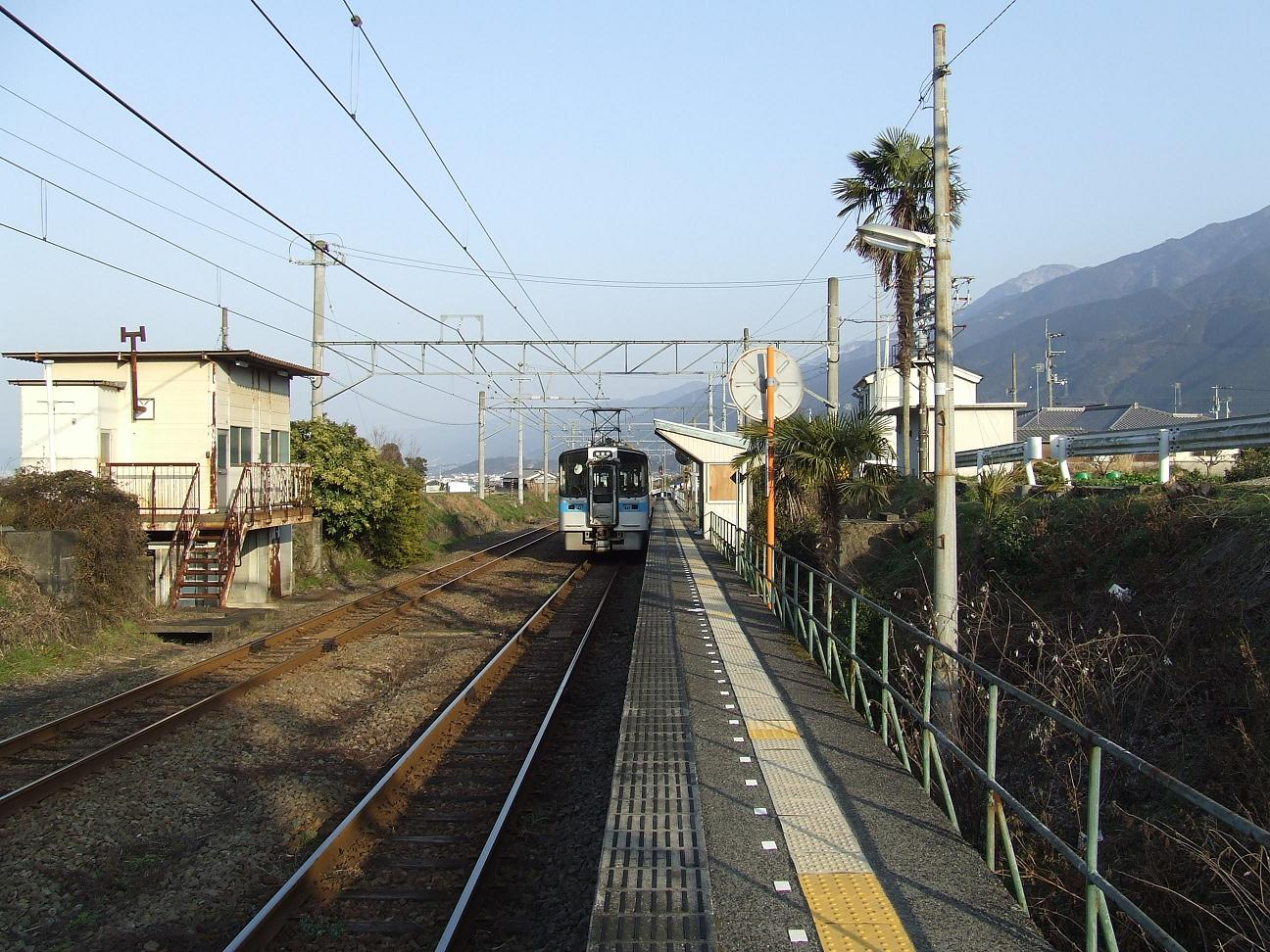
- Sekigawa Station in 2008

General information
- Location: Doicho Kitano, Shikokuchūō-shi, Ehime-ken 799-0722; Japan
- Coordinates: 33°57′22″N 133°23′33″E
- Operator: JR Shikoku
- Line: ■ Yosan Line
- Distance: 92.2 km from Takamatsu
- Platforms: 1 side platform
- Tracks: 1 + 1 passing line

Construction
- Structure type: At grade
- Cycle facilities: Bike shed
- Accessible: Yes - ramp to platform from access road

Other information
- Status: Unstaffed
- Station code: Y27

History
- Opened: 15 April 1961

Passengers
- FY2019: 106
Location
- Location within Ehime Prefecture Location within Japan

Sekigawa Station (関川駅, Sekigawa-eki) is a passenger railway station located in the city of Shikokuchūō, Ehime Prefecture, Japan. It is operated by JR Shikoku and has the station number "Y27".

== Lines ==
Sekigawa Station is served by the JR Shikoku Yosan Line and is located 92.2 km from the beginning of the line at Takamatsu. Yosan line local, Rapid Sunport, and Nanpū Relay services stop at the station.

== Layout ==
The station, which is unstaffed, consists of a side platform serving a single track. There is no station building, only a shelter for waiting passengers. A ramp leads down to the platform from the access road which is at a higher level. A bike shed is located nearby. The station is located on a siding. A passing line runs parallel and is used by trains which do not stop at the station.

== Adjacent stations ==
«	Service	»
Yosan Line
Iyo-Doi	Rapid Sunport	Takihama
Iyo-Doi	Nanpū Relay	Takihama
Iyo-Doi	Local	Takihama

== History ==
Japanese National Railways (JNR) opened Sekigawa on 15 April 1961 as a new station on the existing Yosan Line. With the privatization of JNR on 1 April 1987, control of the station passed to JR Shikoku.

== Surrounding area ==
The Seki River, which is the origin of the station name, flows slightly south from the station, and crossing the river leads to Japan National Route 11.

== See also ==
- List of railway stations in Japan
