= Akaboshi Station =

Railway station in Shikokuchūō, Ehime Prefecture, Japan

Y25 Akaboshi Station 赤星駅
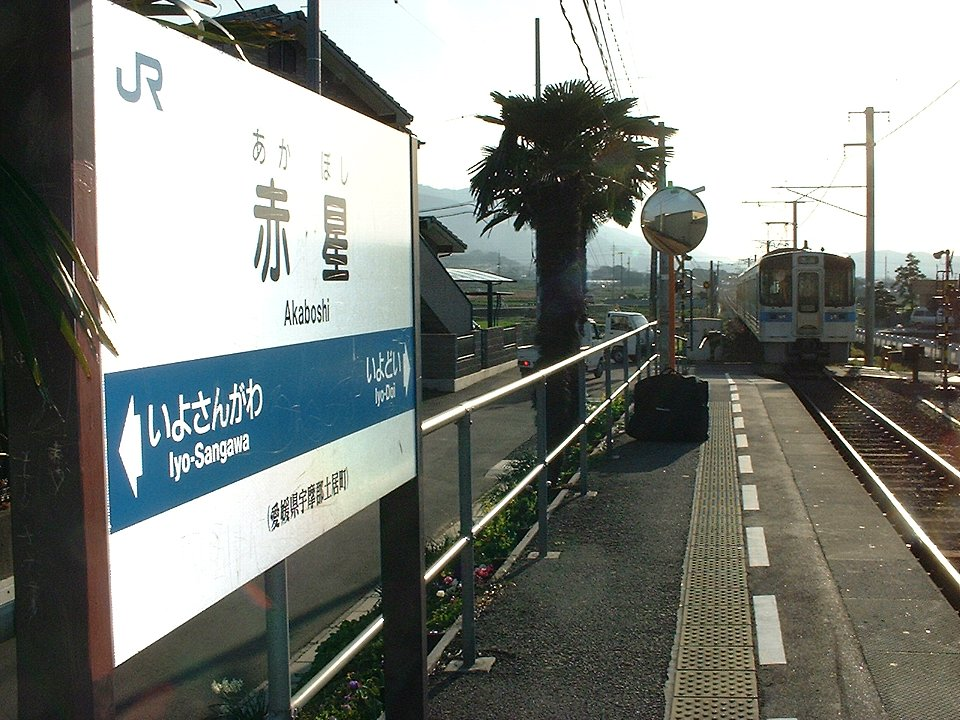
- Akaboshi Station platform, March 2003

General information
- Location: Doicho Tsune, Shikokuchūō-shi, Ehime-ken 799-0704; Japan
- Coordinates: 33°58′0.23″N 133°27′22.86″E
- Operator: JR Shikoku
- Line: ■ Yosan Line
- Distance: 85.9 km from Takamatsu
- Platforms: 1 side platform
- Tracks: 1

Construction
- Structure type: At grade
- Cycle facilities: Bike shed
- Accessible: Yes - ramp leads up to platform

Other information
- Status: Unstaffed
- Station code: Y25

History
- Opened: 1 March 1960

Passengers
- FY2019: 234
Location
- Location within Ehime Prefecture Location within Japan

Akaboshi Station (赤星駅, Akaboshi-eki) is a passenger railway station located in the city of Shikokuchūō, Ehime Prefecture, Japan. It is operated by JR Shikoku and has the station number "Y25".

== Lines ==
Akaboshi Station is served by the JR Shikoku Yosan Line and is located 85.9 km from the beginning of the line at Takamatsu Station. Yosan line local, Rapid Sunport, and Nanpū Relay services stop at the station.

== Layout ==
The station consists of a side platform serving a single track. There is no station building, only a shelter on the platform for waiting passengers. The local municipality has built a waiting room and toilet by the side of the track where a bike shed has also been set up. A ramp leads up to the platform.

== Adjacent stations ==
«	Service	»
Yosan Line
Iyo-Sangawa	Rapid Sunport	Iyo-Doi
Iyo-Sangawa	Nanpū Relay	Iyo-Doi
Iyo-Sangawa	Local	Iyo-Doi

== History ==
Japanese National Railways (JNR) opened Akaboshi on 1 March 1960 as a new station on the existing Yosan Line. With the privatization of JNR on 1 April 1987, control of the station passed to JR Shikoku.

== Surrounding area ==
- Japan National Route 11
- Sanpuku-ji
- Shikokuchuo Municipal Nagatsu Elementary School

== See also ==
- List of railway stations in Japan
