= Niihama Station =

Railway station in Niihama, Ehime Prefecture, Japan

Y29 Niihama Station 新居浜駅
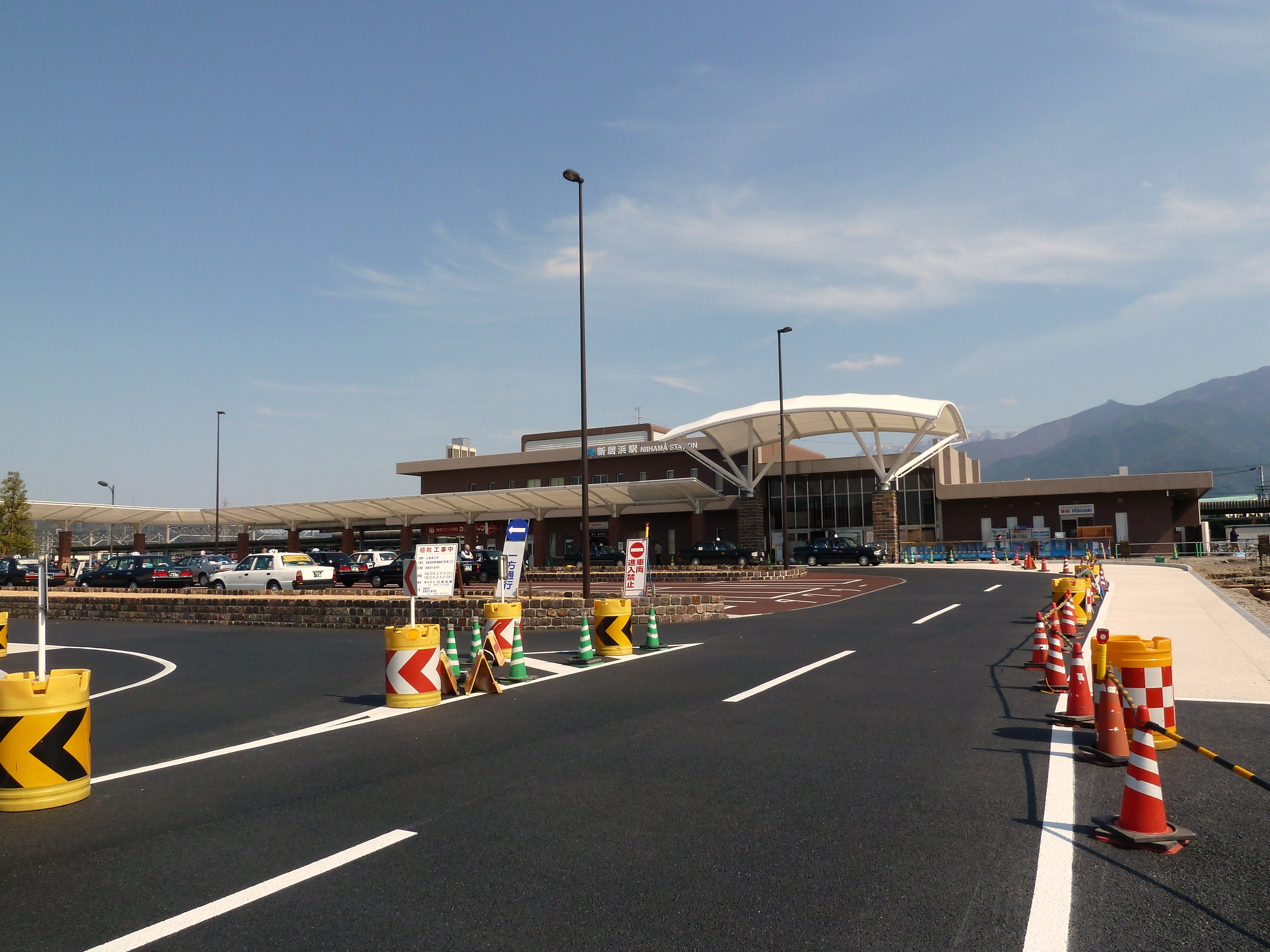
- Niihama Station in 2011

General information
- Location: 2-3 Sakaichō, Niihama-shi, Ehime-ken 792-0812; Japan
- Coordinates: 33°56′54″N 133°17′39″E
- Operator: JR Shikoku JR Freight
- Line: ■ Yosan Line
- Distance: 103.1 km from Takamatsu
- Platforms: 1 side + 1 island platforms
- Tracks: 3 + numerous sidings and passing loops

Construction
- Structure type: At grade
- Parking: Available
- Accessible: Yes - link bridge to platforms equipped with elevators

Other information
- Status: Staffed (Midori no Madoguchi)
- Station code: Y29
- Website: Official website

History
- Opened: 21 June 1921

Passengers
- FY2023: 1953
Location
- Location within Ehime Prefecture Location within Japan

Niihama Station (新居浜駅, Niihama-eki) is a railway station located in the city of Niihama, Ehime Prefecture, Japan. It is operated by JR Shikoku and has the station number "Y29".It is also a freight depot for the Japan Freight Railway Company (JR Freight).

== Lines ==
Niihama Station is served by the JR Shikoku Yosan Line and is located 103.1 km from the beginning of the line at Takamatsu. Yosan line local trains which serve this station ply the Kan'onji - Iyo-Saijō sector. Passengers on local services continuing eastwards or westwards have to change trains. The Rapid Sunport, and Nanpū Relay local trains serve this station and provide a through service to Takamatsu.

In addition, the following JR Shikoku limited express services also serve the station:

- Shiokaze - from Okayama to Matsuyama and Uwajima
- Ishizuchi - from Matsuyama to Takamatsu and Uwajima
- Midnight Express Takamatsu - in one direction only, from Takamatsu to Iyo-Saijō
- Morning Express Takamatsu - in one direction only, from Iyo-Saijō to Takamatsu
- Midnight Express Matsuyama - in one direction only, from Matsuyama and ends here
- Morning Express Matsuyama - in one direction only, starts here for Matsuyama

== Layout ==
The station consists of an island platform and a side platform serving three tracks. The station building houses a waiting room, shops, a JR Midori no Madoguchi ticket window and a JR Travel Centre (Warp Plaza). Car parking and rental are available. The island platform is reached by means of a bridge equipped with elevators for barrier-free access.

Numerous sidings and passing loops branch off on the south side of the station serving a freight container platform and freight yard.

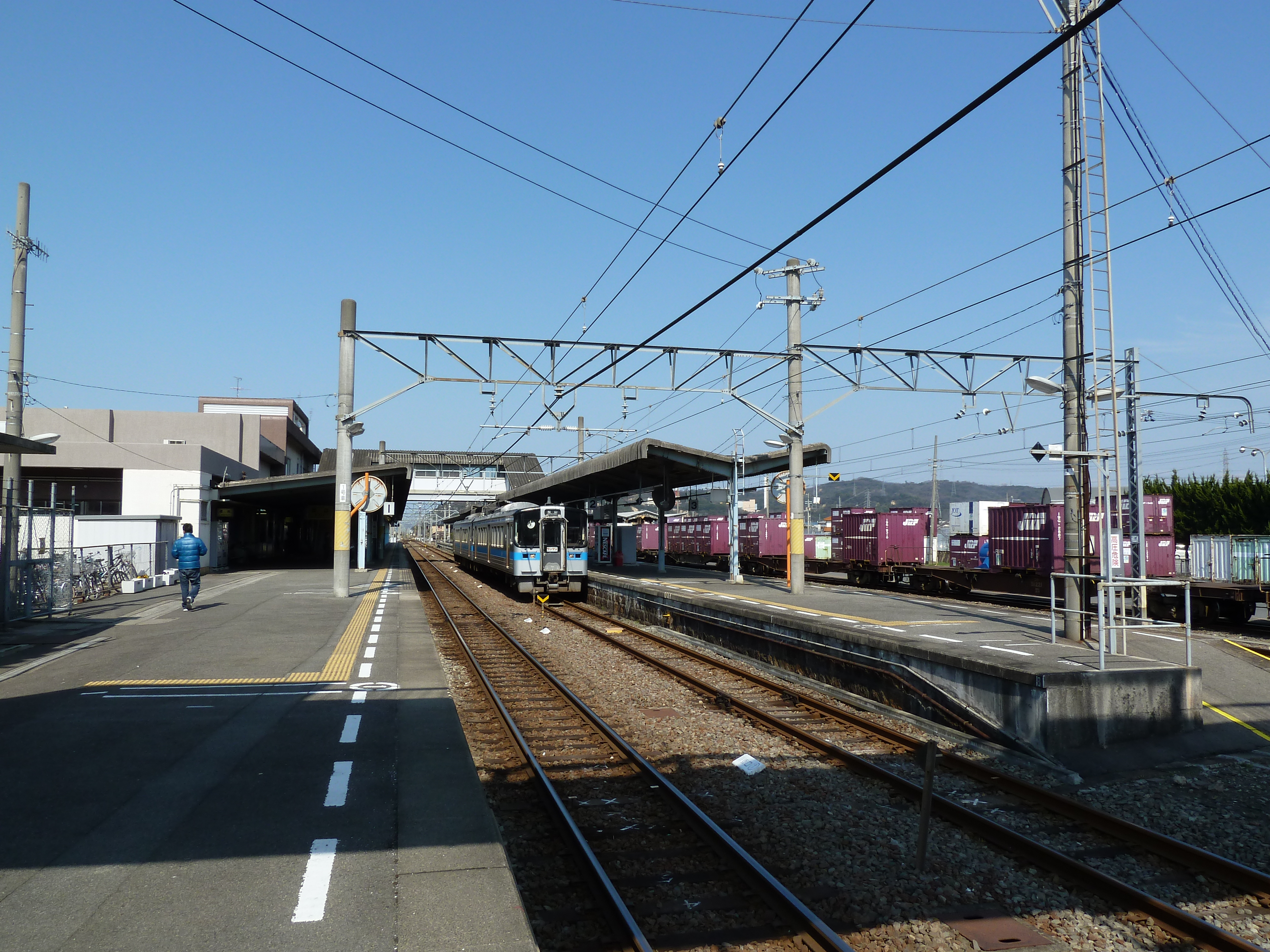
A view of the side and island platform in 2011. To the right is a freight train on a passing siding.

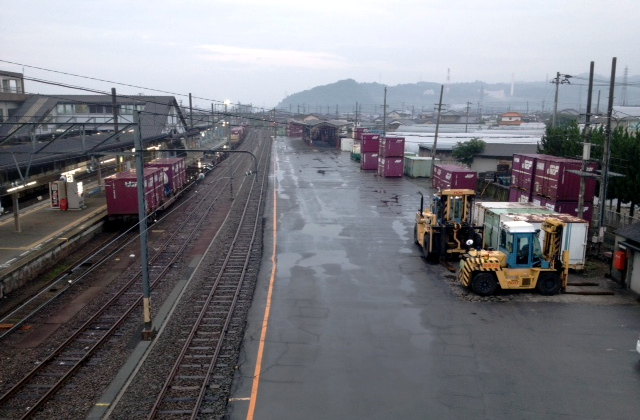
To the left is the island platform with a freight train. Next to it can be seen two passing sidings, the rightmost one served by the container platform. This photo was taken in 2012.

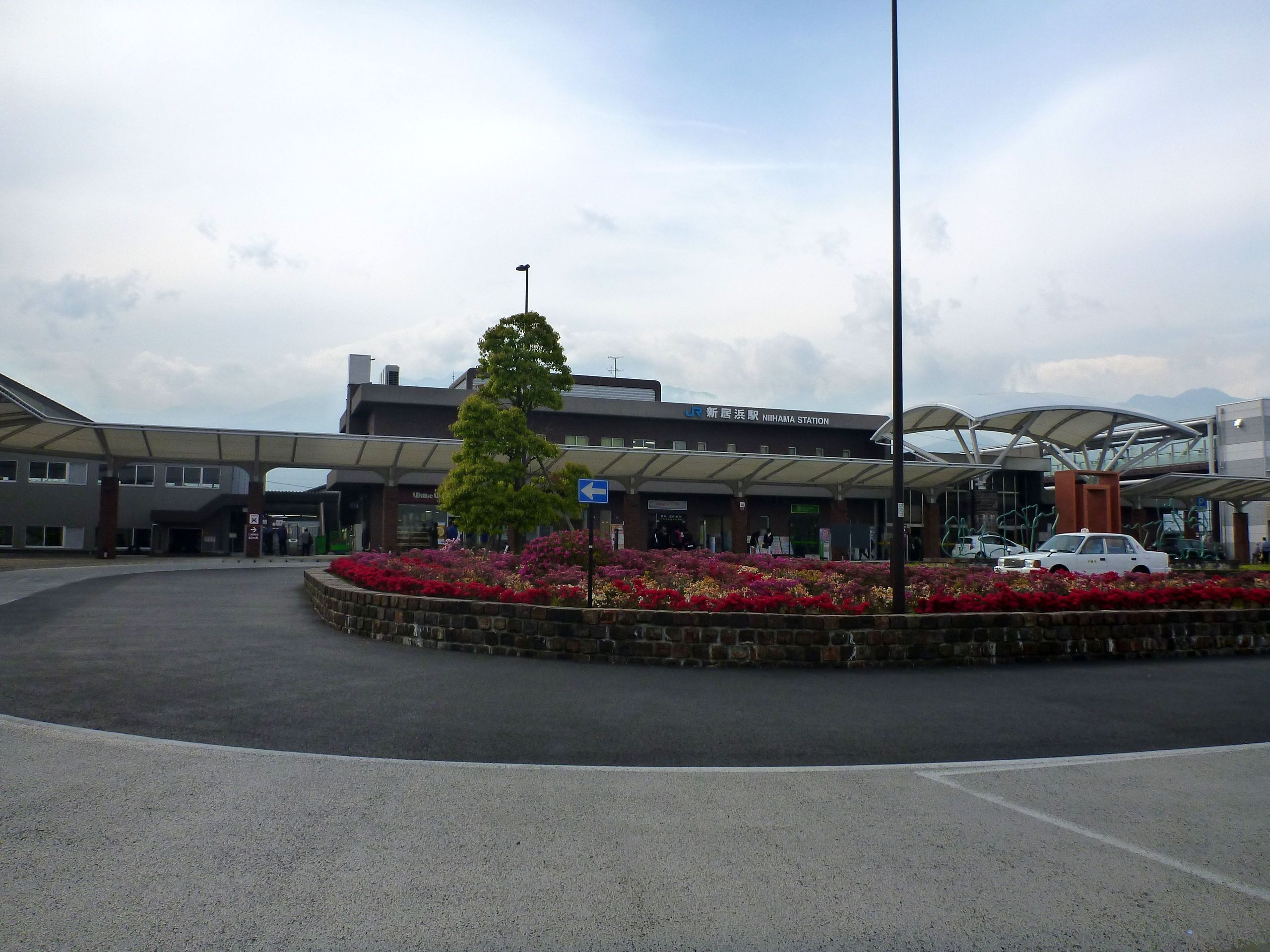
Niihama Station in 2015. To the right can be seen the North-South free passage, an elevator equipped bridge which allows pedestrians to cross the tracks.

== Adjacent stations ==
«	Service	»
JR Limited Express Services
Iyo-Mishima	Shiokaze	Iyo-Saijō
Iyo-Mishima	Ishizuchi	Iyo-Saijō
Iyo-Mishima	Midnight Express Takamatsu	Iyo-Saijō
Iyo-Saijō	Morning Express Takamatsu	Iyo-Mishima
Iyo-Saijō	Midnight Express Matsuyama	Terminus
Terminus	Morning Express Matsuyama	Iyo-Saijō
Yosan Line
Takihama	Rapid Sunport	Nakahagi
Takihama	Nanpū Relay	Nakahagi
Takihama	Local	Nakahagi

== History ==
Niihama Station opened on 21 June 1921 as an intermediate stop when the then Sanuki Line was extended westwards from Iyo-Doi to Iyo-Saijō. At that time the station was operated by Japanese Government Railways, later becoming Japanese National Railways (JNR). With the privatization of JNR on 1 April 1987, control of the station passed to JR Shikoku and JR Freight.

On 25 September 2017, JR Shikoku completed a barrier-free upgrade project for the station. The existing footbridge linking the platforms was replaced by a new bridge equipped with elevators.

== Surrounding area ==
- Niihama Station North-South Free Passage (新居浜駅南北自由通路) - a bridge equipped with elevators which crosses the tracks, allowing access to parts of the town north and south of the station. The bridge opened on 1 February 2014 and was part of a municipal project to upgrade the area surrounding the station with plazas and parking lots.

== See also ==
- List of railway stations in Japan
