= Ehime Prefectural Uwajima Fisheries High School =

- 愛媛県立宇和島水産高等学校
- Ehime Kenritsu Uwajima Suisan Kōtōgakkō
- Location of Ehime Prefectural Uwajima Fisheries High School in Ehime Prefecture

Location
- 1 Chōme-2-20 Meirinchō, Uwajima-shi, Ehime-ken; 798-0068; Japan; 33°13′08″N 132°33′20″E

Information
- Other name: Ehime Prefectural Uwajima Fishery High School
- Former names: Ehime Prefectural Fisheries School (1945–1948); Ehime Prefectural Fisheries High School (1948–1949); Ehime Prefectural Uwajima Minami High School Fisheries course (1949–1956)
- Type: Public high school ( Ehime Prefectural )
- Established: April 12, 1945
- Status: Open
- Authorizer: Ehime Prefecture
- Superintendent: Ehime Prefectural Board of Education
- School code: 38146C (High School Code for the National Center for University Entrance Examinations)
- Principal: TAKECHI, Seiji (Since April 2018)
- Grades: 10–12 (Main courses / Senior High years 1st–3rd)
- Gender: Coeducational
- Age: 15 years old to 18 years old (Main courses)
- Enrollment: 125 per grade
- Classes: 15 Classes (5 classes per grade)
- Education system: Full-time high school
- Language: Japanese and English
- Campus type: Coastal
- Annual tuition: ¥118,800 (Students can receive scholarships if they meet the Requirements)
- Nobel laureates: None (As of 2018)
- Website: Ehime Prefectural Uwajima Fisheries High School

Ehime Prefectural Uwajima Fisheries High School (愛媛県立宇和島水産高等学校, Ehime Kenritsu Uwajima Suisan Kōtōgakkō) is a public high school located in Meirinchō, Uwajima, Ehime, Shikoku, Japan established in 1945 as the Ehime Prefectural Fisheries School (愛媛県立水産学校, Ehime Kenritsu Suisan Gakkō).

== Overview ==
Established in 1945, Ehime Prefectural Uwajima Fisheries High School has produced a large number of alumni. The school was established on April 12, 1945 as an Ehime Prefectural Fisheries School with a capacity of 50 people. The school is the only fishery high school in Ehime Prefecture in Uwajima-shi, an area known for its production of Pagrus aquaculture and pearl aquaculture.

== Ehime Maru and USS Greeneville collision ==
The school operated the vessel Ehime Maru (4th generation), which the USS Greenville, a U.S. Navy submarine, struck and sank on February 9, 2001 during the Ehime Maru and USS Greeneville collision.

The school acquired a new Ehime Maru (5th generation) ship with settlement money from the U.S. Navy. The new ship sailed to Hawaii in 2003. In Hawaii, the principal at the time of the disaster, Kazumitsu Joko (上甲 一光 Jōkō Kazumitsu), read a message from Moriyuki Kato (加戸 守行 Kato Moriyuki), the governor of Ehime Prefecture, addressed to the Hawaiian people.
