= Nakahagi Station =

Railway station in Niihama, Ehime Prefecture, Japan

Y30 Nakahagi Station 中萩駅
- Nakahagi Station in 2011

General information
- Location: Ojoin, Niihama-shi, Ehime-ken 792-0060; Japan
- Coordinates: 33°55′34″N 133°15′11″E
- Operator: JR Shikoku
- Line: ■ Yosan Line
- Distance: 107.9 km from Takamatsu
- Platforms: 2 side platforms
- Tracks: 2 + 1 siding

Construction
- Structure type: At grade
- Accessible: No - platforms linked by footbridge

Other information
- Status: Unstaffed
- Station code: Y30

History
- Opened: 21 September 1921

Passengers
- FY2019: 222
Location
- Location within Ehime Prefecture Location within Japan

Nakahagi Station (中萩駅, Nakahagi-eki) is a passenger railway station located in the city of Niihama, Ehime Prefecture, Japan. It is operated by JR Shikoku and has the station number "Y30".

== Lines ==
Nakahagi Station is served by the JR Shikoku Yosan Line and is located 107.9 km from the beginning of the line at Takamatsu. Yosan line local, Rapid Sunport, and Nanpū Relay services stop at the station.

== Layout ==
The station, which is unstaffed, consists of two opposed side platforms serving two tracks. The station building is unstaffed and serves only as a waiting room. Access to the opposite side platform is by means of a footbridge. A siding branches off line 1 and leads to a disused freight platform.

== Adjacent stations ==
«	Service	»
Yosan Line
Niihama	Rapid Sunport	Iyo-Saijō
Niihama	Nanpū Relay	Iyo-Saijō
Niihama	Local	Iyo-Saijō

== History ==
Nakahagi Station opened on 21 September 1921 on the then Sanuki Line. At that time the station was operated by Japanese Government Railways, later becoming Japanese National Railways (JNR). With the privatization of JNR on 1 April 1987, control of the station passed to JR Shikoku.

== Surrounding area ==
There is a small station square in front of the station, and a road leading to Japan National Route 11 extends south from there. The area around the station is a residential area, but there are no shops in front of the station.

== See also ==
- List of railway stations in Japan
