= Ehime Prefectural Board of Education =

Board of education in Ehime, Japan

- 愛媛県教育委員会; Ehime-ken Kyōiku Iinkai

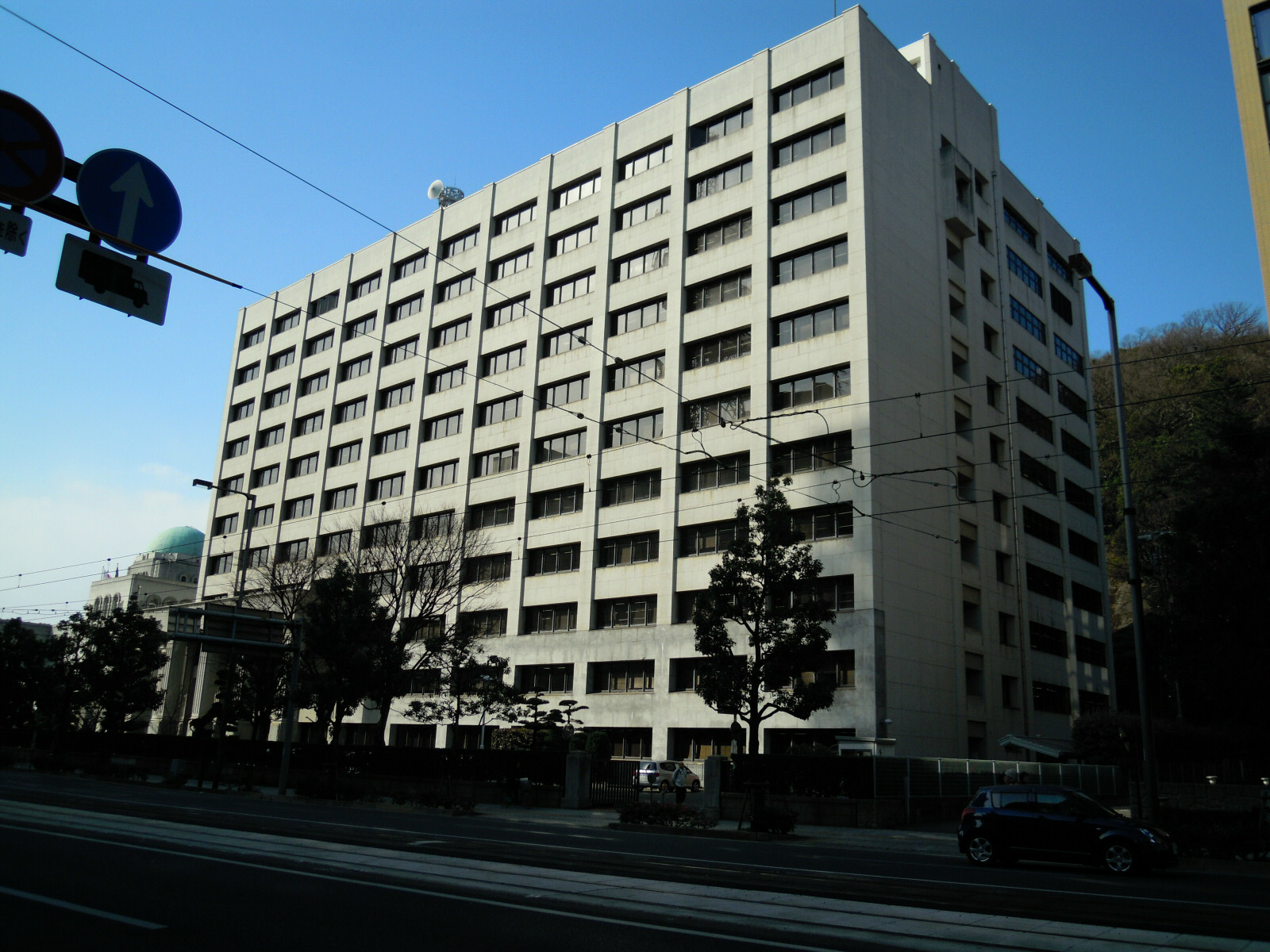
- The first annex, Ehime Prefecture

Ehime Prefectural overview
- Jurisdiction: Ehime Prefecture
- Headquarters: 4 Chome-4-2 Ichibanchō, Matsuyama-shi, Ehime-ken, Japan; 33°50′30″N 132°45′58″E
- Ehime Prefectural executives: MIYOSHI, Isao, (Superintendent of education); SEKI, Keizō SHIMIZU, Keiko TOMINAGA, Seiji TAKATA, Chise TAKEMOTO, Kozō
- Parent Ehime Prefectural: (Ehime Prefecture) Ehime Prefectural Government
- Website: Ehime Prefectural Board of Education (Japanese)

Map
- Location of Ehime Prefecture

The Ehime Prefectural Board of Education (愛媛県教育委員会, Ehime-Ken Kyōiku Iinkai) is the board of education in Ehime, Japan.

== Schools operated by the Ehime Prefectural Board of Education ==
=== High schools operated by the prefecture ===
==== Matsuyama-shi (Capital city of Ehime) ====
- Ehime Prefectural Matsuyama Central Senior High School
- Ehime Prefectural Matsuyama Higashi High School

==== Shikokuchūō-shi ====
- Ehime Prefectural Mishima High School

==== Uwajima-shi ====
- Ehime Prefectural Uwajima Fisheries High School
