= Iyo-Sangawa Station =

Railway station in Shikokuchūō, Ehime Prefecture, Japan

Y24 Iyo-Sangawa Station 伊予寒川駅
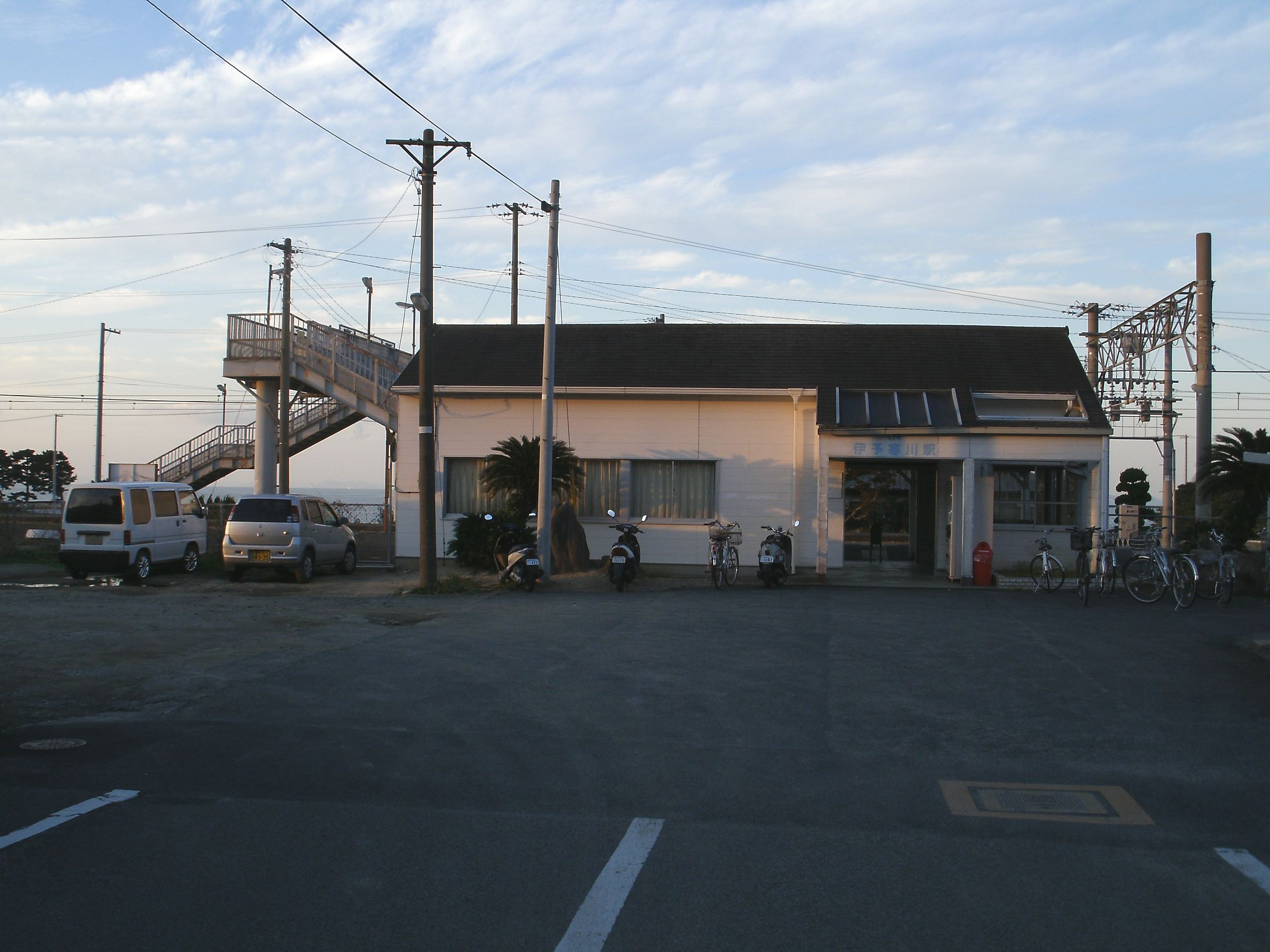
- Iyo-Sangawa Station in 2009

General information
- Location: Sangawacho, Shikokuchūō-shi, Ehime-ken 799-0431; Japan
- Coordinates: 33°58′04″N 133°30′00″E
- Operator: JR Shikoku
- Line: ■ Yosan Line
- Distance: 81.7 km from Takamatsu
- Platforms: 2 side platforms
- Tracks: 2 + 2 sidings

Construction
- Structure type: At grade
- Parking: Available
- Accessible: No - access to platform 2 is by footbridge

Other information
- Status: Unstaffed
- Station code: Y24

History
- Opened: 1 April 1933

Passengers
- FY2019: 220
Location
- Location within Ehime Prefecture Location within Japan

Iyo-Sangawa Station (伊予寒川駅, Iyo-Sangawa-eki) is a passenger railway station located in the city of Shikokuchūō, Ehime Prefecture, Japan. It is operated by JR Shikoku and has the station number "Y24".

== Lines ==
Iyo-Sangawa Station is served by the JR Shikoku Yosan Line and is located 81.7 km from the beginning of the line at Takamatsu. Yosan line local, Rapid Sunport, and Nanpū Relay services stop at the station.

== Layout ==
The station consists of two side platforms serving two tracks. The station building is unstaffed and serves as a waiting room. Access to platform 2 is by means of a footbridge.

Sidings branch off the tracks on both sides of the station.

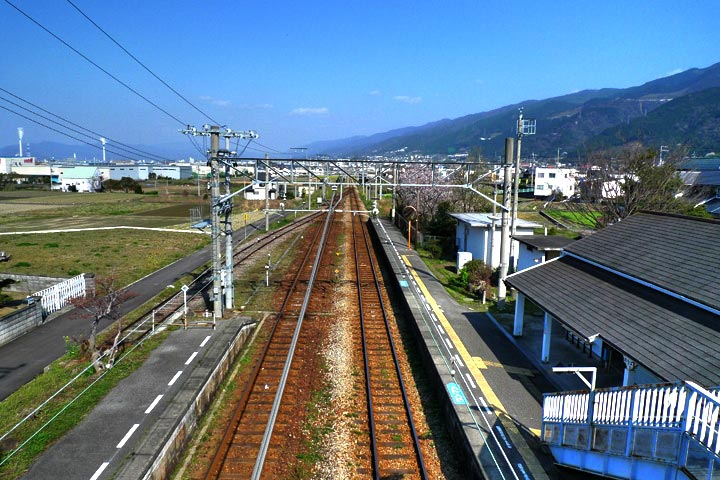
A view of the platforms of Iyo-Sangawa Station in 2010. A siding can be seen branching off track 2 on the right.

== Adjacent stations ==
«	Service	»
Yosan Line
Iyo-Mishima	Rapid Sunport	Akaboshi
Iyo-Mishima	Nanpū Relay	Akaboshi
Iyo-Mishima	Local	Akaboshi

== History ==
The station opened on 1 April 1933 as a new station on the existing Yosan Line. At that time the station was operated by Japanese Government Railways, later becoming Japanese National Railways (JNR). With the privatization of JNR on 1 April 1987, control of the station passed to JR Shikoku.

Scenes from the 2010 movie Shodo Girls were filmed at this station.

== Surrounding area ==
- Japan National Route 11
- Samukawa Toyooka Seaside Park
- Shikokuchuo Municipal Mishima Minami Junior High School

== See also ==
- List of railway stations in Japan
