= Ishizuchi =

Japanese limited express train service

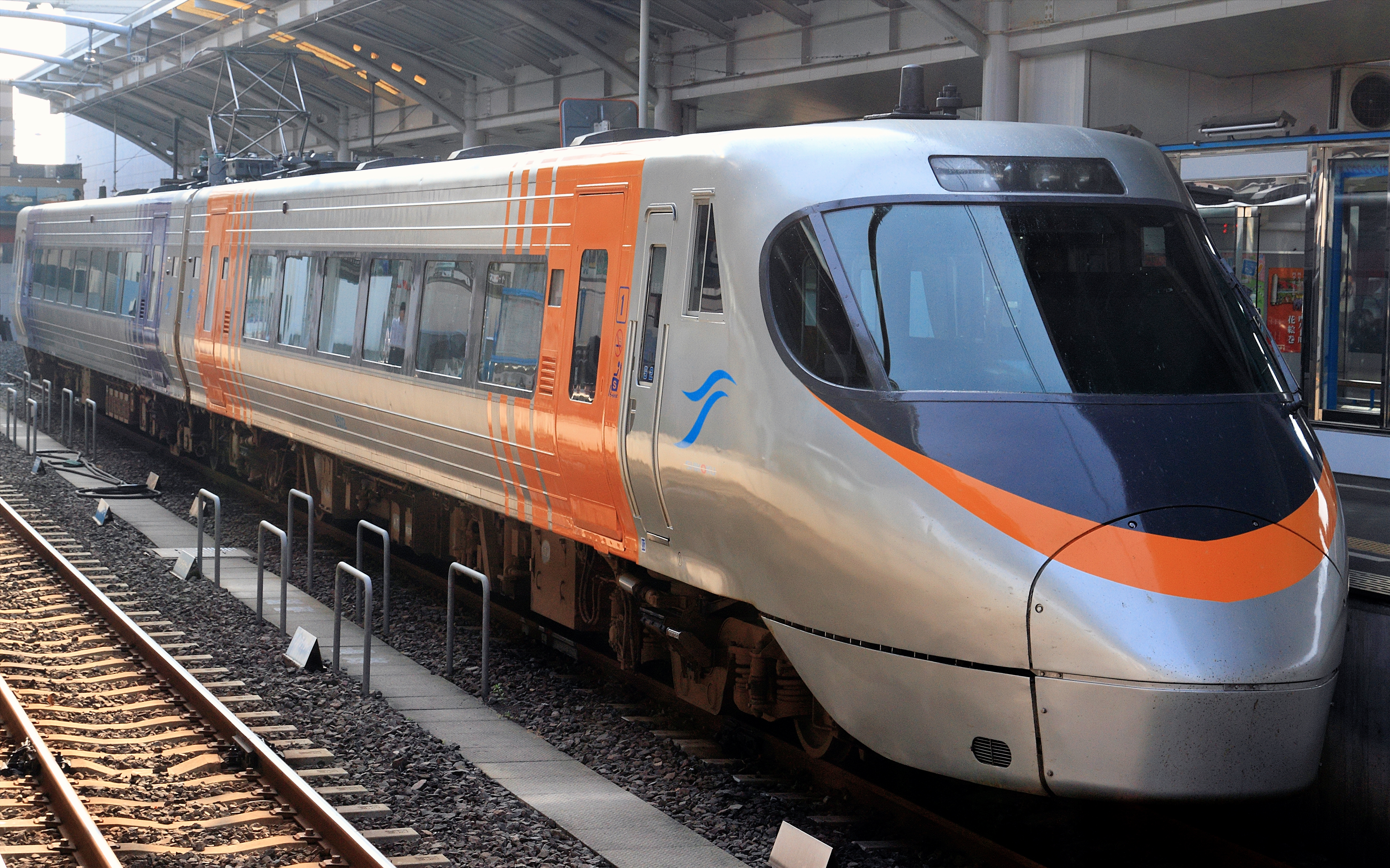
- An 8000 series EMU on an Ishizuchi service in May 2011

Overview
- Service type: Limited express
- First service: 1988
- Current operator: JR Shikoku

Route
- Line used: Yosan Line

Technical
- Rolling stock: 8000 series EMUs, 8600 series EMUs
- Track gauge: 1,067 mm (3 ft 6 in)
- Electrification: 1,500 V DC
- Operating speed: 130 km/h (81 mph)

The Ishizuchi (いしづち) is a limited express train service in Japan operated by JR Shikoku, which runs from Takamatsu to Iyo-Saijō, Matsuyama and Uwajima.

The Ishizuchi service was introduced on 10 April 1988.

== Route ==
The main stations served by this service are as follows. Stations in parentheses indicate that not all Ishizuchi serves the station. The limited express Shiokaze connects with Ishizuchi from Utazu station.

Takamatsu - Sakaide - Utazu - Marugame - Tadotsu - (Takuma) - (Takase) - Kan'onji - Kawanoe - Iyo-Mishima - Niihama - Iyo-Saijō - Nyūgawa - Imabari - (Iyo-Hojo) - Matsuyama

== Rolling stock ==
- 8000 series 2- or 3-car tilting EMUs (Takamatsu - Matsuyama services, coupled with Shiokaze services)
- 8600 series 2- or 4-car tilting EMU formations since 23 June 2014
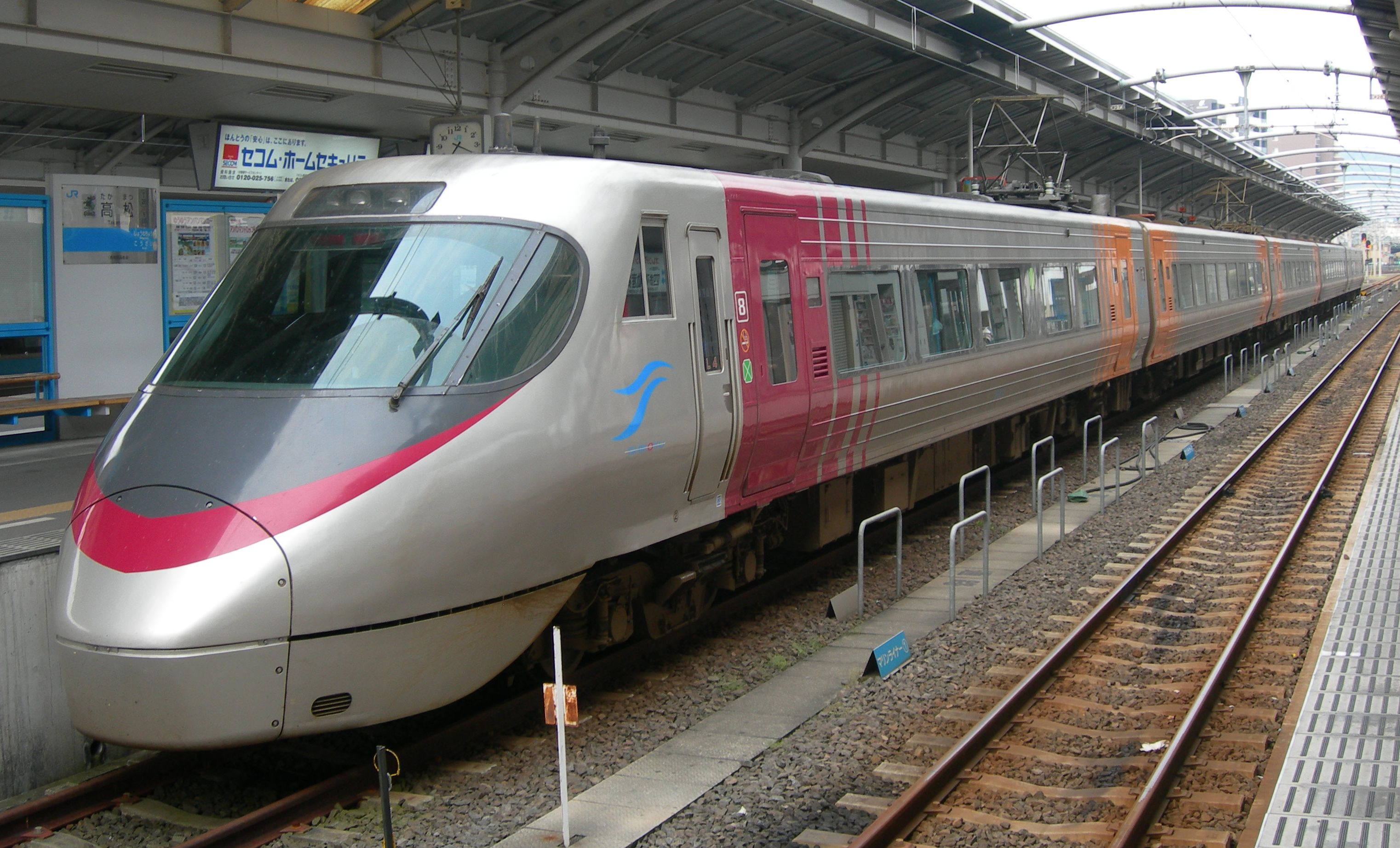
8000 series EMU

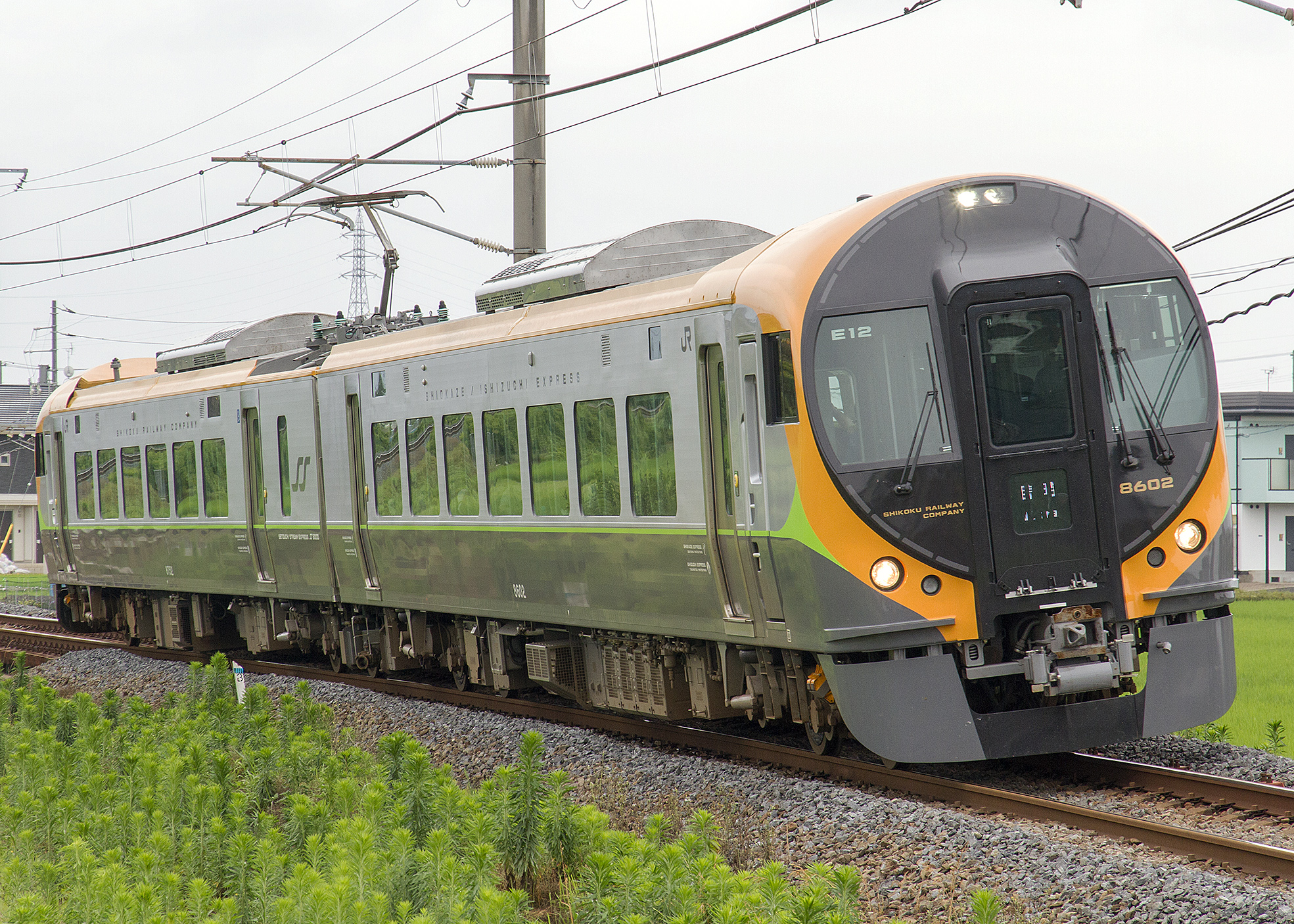
8600 series EMU

=== Past rolling stock ===
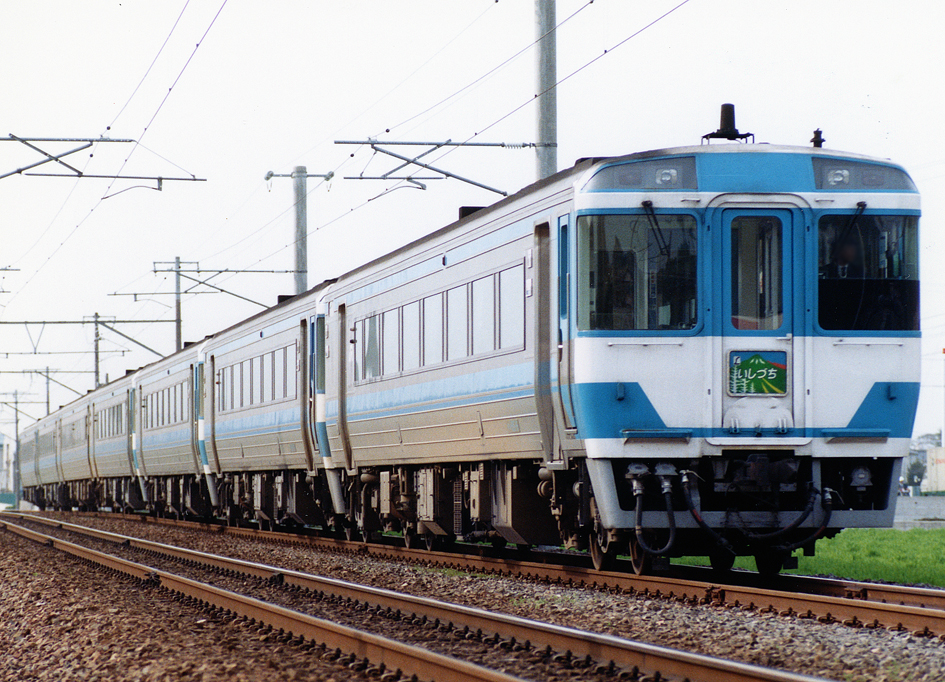
KiHa 185 series DMU on an Ishizuchi service in 1989

- N2000 series 5-car tilting DMUs (1994–2020)
- 2000 series 2- or 3-car tilting DMUs (1994–2020)
- KiHa 181 series DMUs (1988–1993)
- KiHa 185 series DMUs (1988–1993)
