= Ehime Prefectural Mishima High School =

- 愛媛県立三島高等学校
- Ehime Kenritsu Mishima Kōtōgakkō
- Location of Ehime Prefectural Mishima High School in Ehime Prefecture

Location
- 5 Chōme-11-30 Mishimachūō, Shikokuchūō-shi, Ehime-ken; 799-0405; Japan
- Coordinates: 33°58′45″N 133°32′44″E

Information
- Former names: Ehime Prefectural Mishima Middle School (1923–1933); Ehime Prefectural Mishima Girls' Realschule School (1933–1936); Ehime Prefectural Mishima Girls' Realschule High School (1936–1943); Ehime Prefectural Mishima Girls' High School (1943–1948); Ehime Prefectural Mishima First Higher School (1948–1949)
- Type: Public high school ( (Ehime Prefecture) Ehime Prefectural )
- Opened: 1923
- Status: Open
- Sister school: Killara High School (Sydney, Australia)
- School district: Tōyo, Ehime
- Authorizer: Ehime Prefecture
- Superintendent: (Ehime Prefecture) Ehime Prefectural Board of Education
- School code: 38102A (High School Code for the National Center for University Entrance Examinations)
- Grades: 10-12 (Senior High years 1st-3rd)
- Gender: Coeducational
- Age: 15 years old to 18 years old
- Enrollment: 280 per grade (Academic:240, Commerce:40)
- Classes: 21 Classes (7classes per grade / Academic:6, Commerce:1)
- Average class size: 40 people
- Education system: Full-time high school
- Language: Japanese and English
- Annual tuition: ¥118,800 (Students can receive scholarships if they meet the Requirements)
- Nobel laureates: Syukuro Manabe
- Website: Ehime Prefectural Mishima High School

Ehime Prefectural Mishima High School (愛媛県立三島高等学校, Ehime Kenritsu Mishima Kōtōgakkō) is a public high school located in Mishimachūō, Shikokuchūō, Ehime, Shikoku, Japan opened in 1923 as the Ehime Prefectural Mishima Middle School (愛媛県立三島中学校, Ehime Kenritsu Mishima Chūgakkō).

== Overview ==
Opened in 1923, Ehime Prefectural Mishima High School has produced a large number of alumni. The School was the inspiration for the 2010 Japanese movie Shodo Girls.

== Notable alumni ==
- Syukuro Manabe, Nobel Laureate (physics)
- Shinya Ishikawa, professional wrestler.

== Sister school ==
- Killara High School (Sydney, Australia)
