= Shiokaze (train) =

Train service operated by JR Shikoku

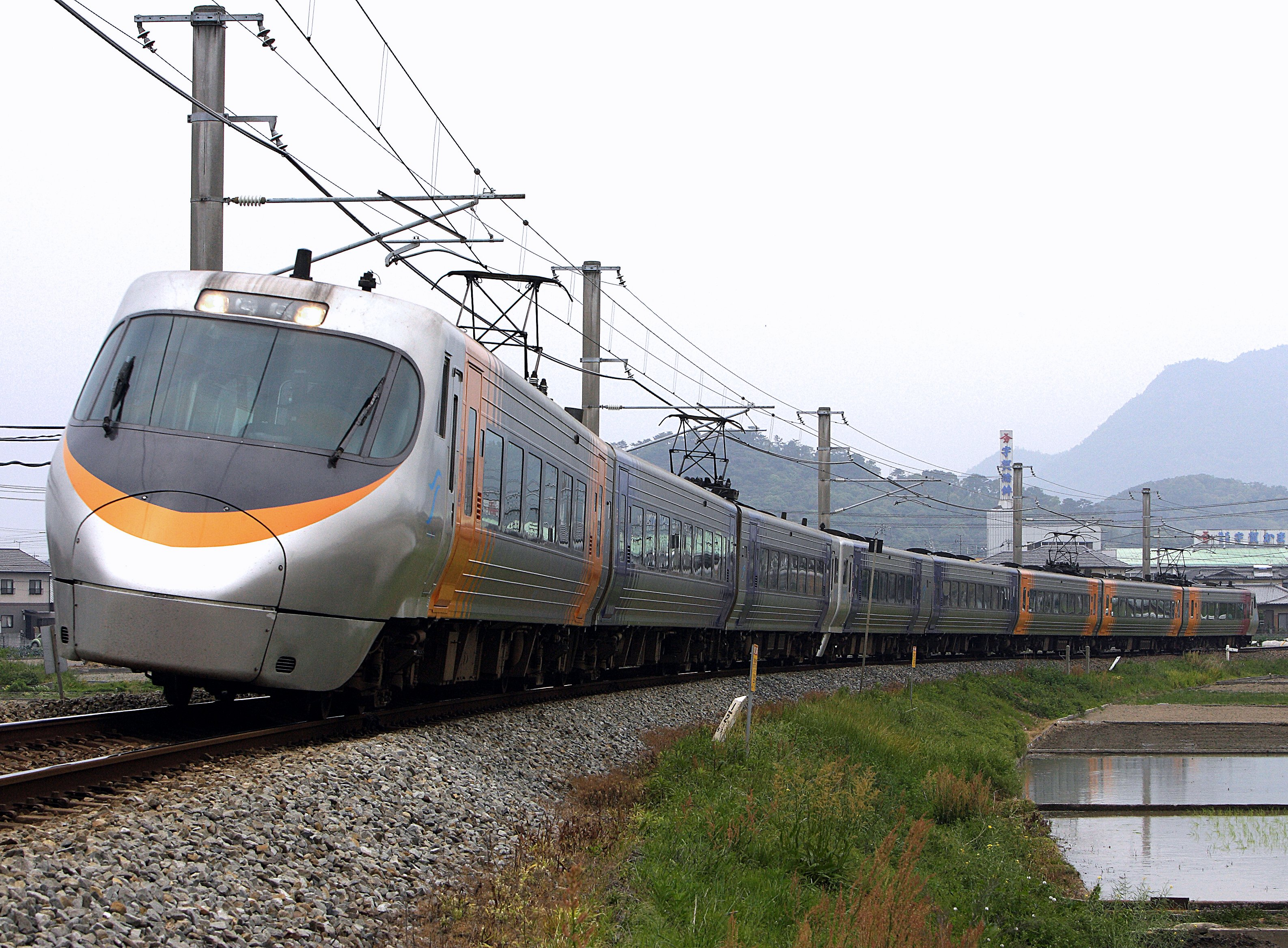
- 8000 series train on a Shiokaze service in May 2007

Overview
- Service type: Limited express
- First service: 1972
- Current operator(s): JR Shikoku

Route
- Line(s) used: Seto-Ōhashi Line, Yosan Line

Technical
- Rolling stock: 8000 series EMU, 8600 series EMU
- Operating speed: 130 km/h (81 mph) (max)

The Shiokaze (しおかぜ, English: "sea breeze") is a limited express train service in Japan operated by JR Shikoku which runs from Okayama to Matsuyama.

== Route ==
The main stations served by this service are as follows. Stations in parentheses indicate that not all Shiokaze serves the station. The limited express Ishizuchi connects with Shiokaze from Utazu station.

Okayama - Kojima - Utazu - Marugame - Tadotsu - (Takuma) - (Takase) - Kan'onji - Kawanoe - Iyo-Mishima - Niihama - Iyo-Saijo - Nyugawa - Imabari - (Iyo-Hojo) - Matsuyama

== Rolling stock ==
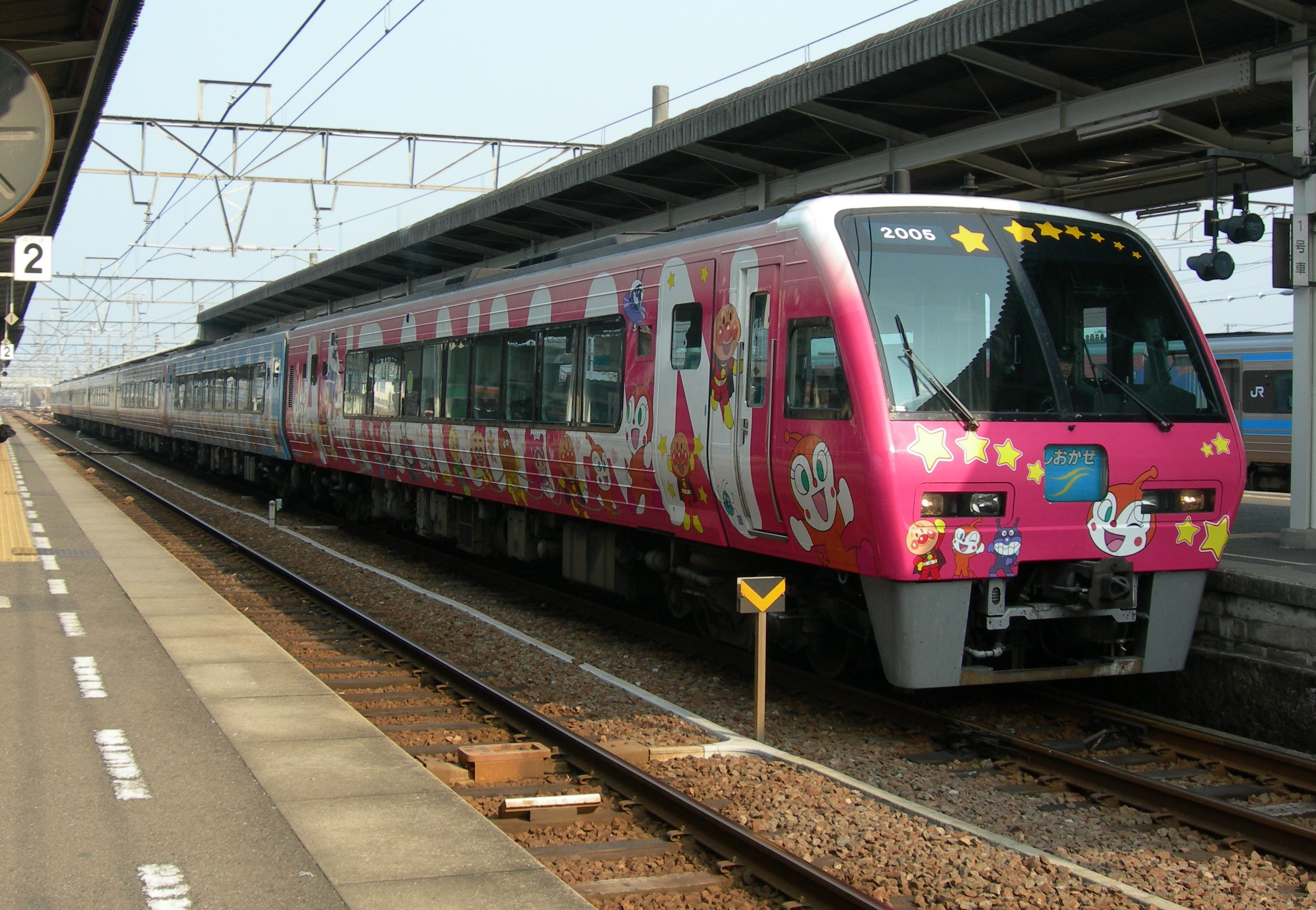
2000 series DMU on a Shiokaze service at Tadotsu Station in January 2008

- 8000 series 5-, or 8-car tilting EMUs (Okayama - Matsuyama services, coupled with Ishizuchi services)
- 8600 series 5-, 7-, or 8-car tilting EMUs

=== Past rolling stock ===
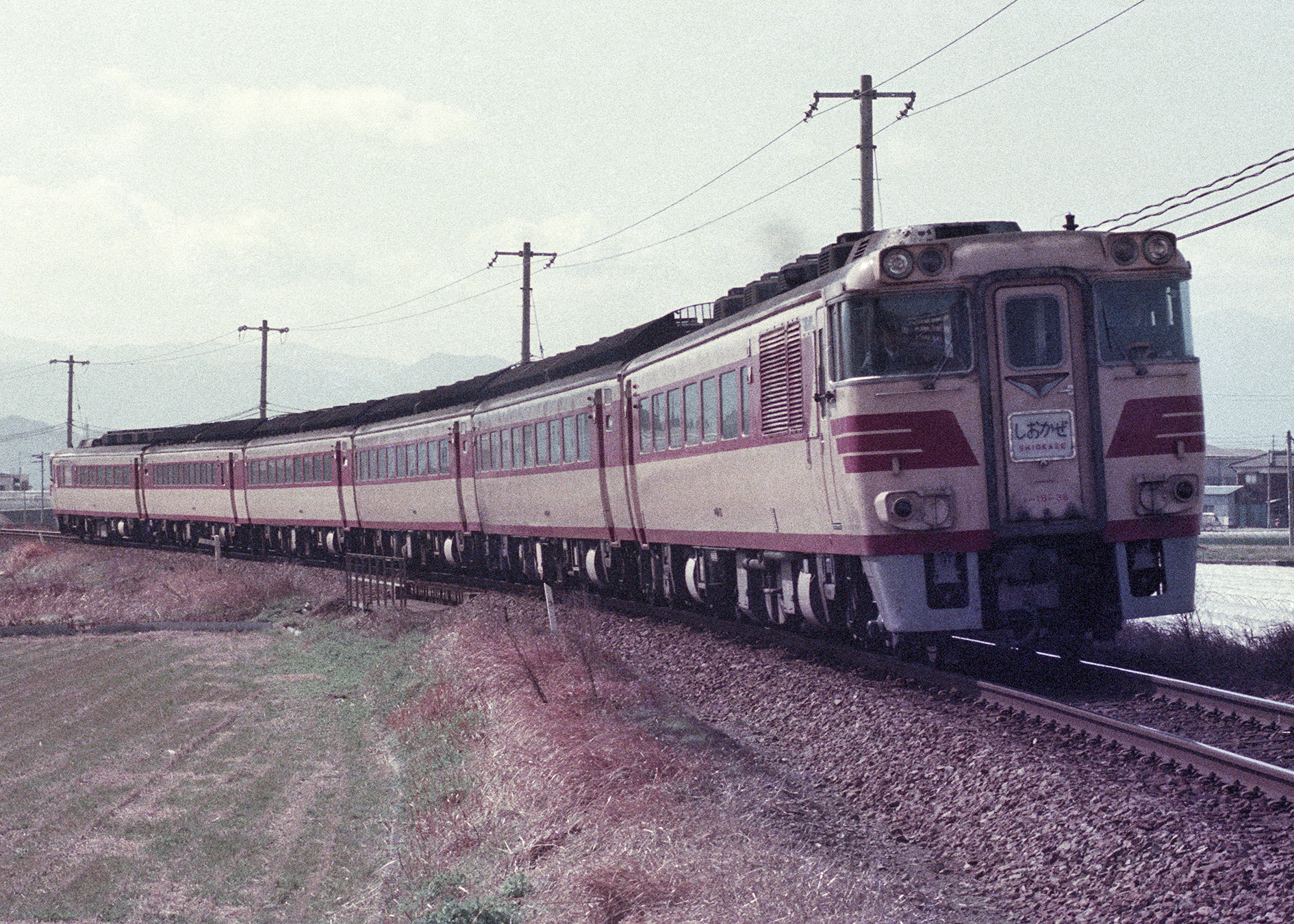
KiHa 181 series DMU on a Shiokaze service in 1985

- KiHa 181 series DMUs (1972–1993)
- KiHa 185 series DMUs (1986–1990)
- 2000 series tilting DMUs (1990–2016)

== History ==
- 1972: Shiokaze services start between Takamatsu and Uwajima and between Takamatsu and Matsuyama.
- 1986: KiHa 185 series DMUs introduced, and Shiokaze becomes L Tokkyū service.
- November 1990: 2000 series tilting DMUs introduced.
- July 1992: 8000 series tilting EMUs introduced.
- 15 March 2008: All cars made no-smoking.
- 26 March 2016: 8600 series tilting EMUs to be introduced on four daily round-trip services. 2000 series trains will be withdrawn.
