= Iyo-Doi Station =

Railway station in Shikokuchūō, Ehime Prefecture, Japan

Y26 Iyo-Doi Station 伊予土居駅
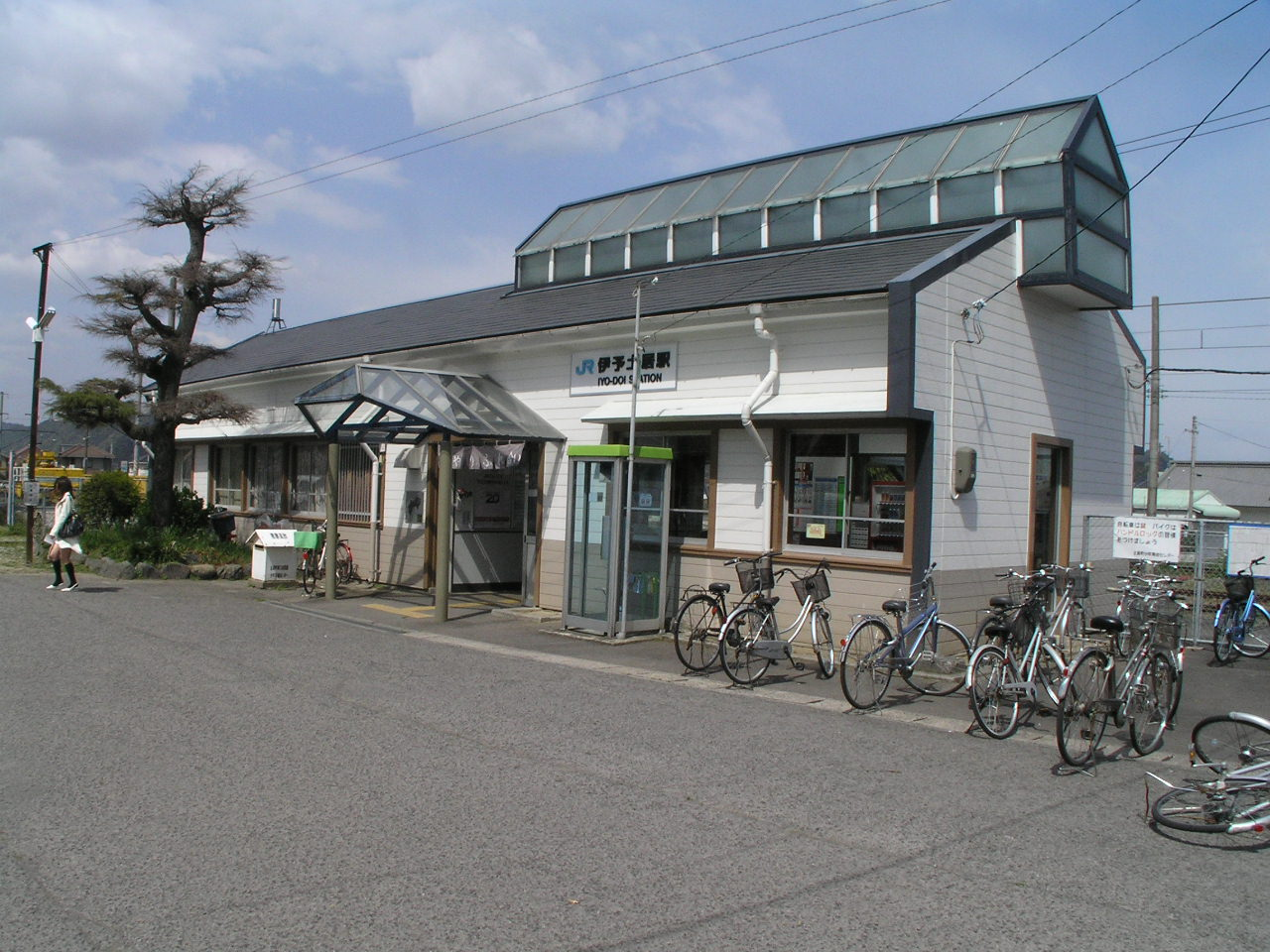
- Iyo-Doi Station in 2007

General information
- Location: Doicho Doi, Shikokuchūō-shi, Ehime-ken 799-0711; Japan
- Coordinates: 33°57′32″N 133°25′42″E
- Operator: JR Shikoku
- Line: ■ Yosan Line
- Distance: 88.6 km from Takamatsu
- Platforms: 1 island platform
- Tracks: 2 + several sidings

Construction
- Structure type: At grade
- Accessible: Yes - island platform accessed by level crossing

Other information
- Status: Unstaffed
- Station code: Y26

History
- Opened: 1 September 1919

Passengers
- FY2019: 644
Location
- Location within Ehime Prefecture Location within Japan

Iyo-Doi Station (伊予土居駅, Iyo-Doi-eki) is a passenger railway station located in the city of Shikokuchūō, Ehime Prefecture, Japan. It is operated by JR Shikoku and has the station number "Y26".

== Lines ==
Iyo-Doi Station is served by the JR Shikoku Yosan Line and is located 88.6 km from the beginning of the line at Takamatsu. Yosan line local, Rapid Sunport, and Nanpū Relay services stop at the station.

== Layout ==
The station consists of an island platform serving two tracks. A station building beside the tracks is unstaffed and serves only as a waiting room. Access to the island platform is by means of a level crossing. A passing siding runs to the side of platform/line 1 and it is necessary to cross it on the way to the island platform. Several other dead-end sidings branch of the tracks.

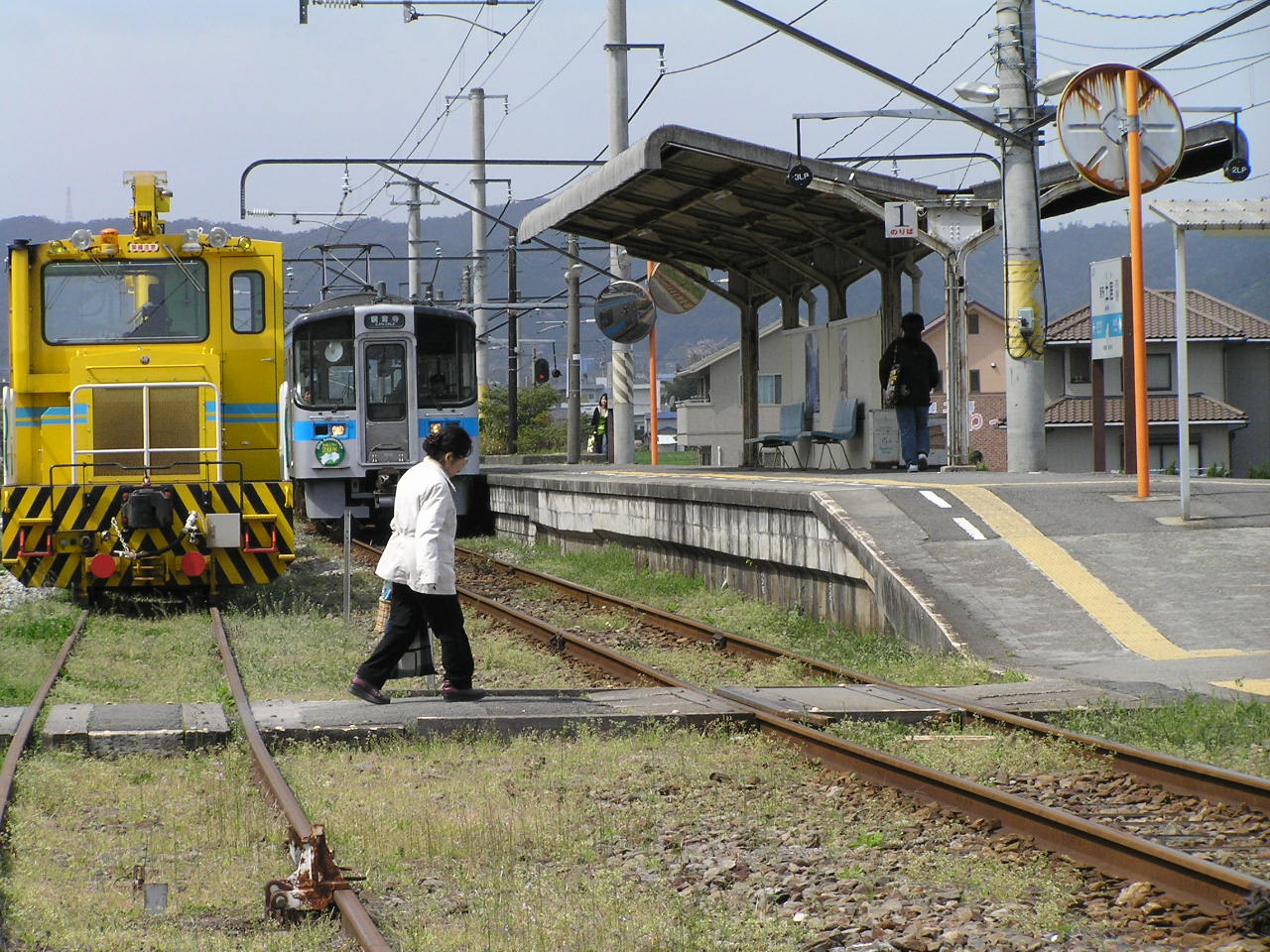
A passenger uses the level crossing to reach the island platform. On the left, the passing siding is being used by a track maintenance vehicle.

== Adjacent stations ==
«	Service	»
Yosan Line
Akaboshi	Rapid Sunport	Sekigawa
Akaboshi	Nanpū Relay	Sekigawa
Akaboshi	Local	Sekigawa

== History ==
Iyo-Doi Station opened on 1 September 1919 as the terminus of the then Sanuki Line which had been extended westwards from Iyo-Mishima. It became a through station on 21 June 1921 when the line was further extended to Iyo-Saijo. At that time the station was operated by Japanese Government Railways, later becoming Japanese National Railways (JNR). With the privatization of JNR on 1 April 1987, control of the station passed to JR Shikoku.

== Surrounding area ==
- Japan National Route 11
- Enmei-ji Temple
- Ehime Prefectural Doi High School
- Shikokuchuo Municipal Doi Junior High School
- Shikokuchuo Municipal Doi Elementary School

== See also ==
- List of railway stations in Japan
