= Iyo-Saijō Station =

Railway station in Saijō, Ehime Prefecture, Japan

Y31 Iyo-Saijō Station 伊予西条駅
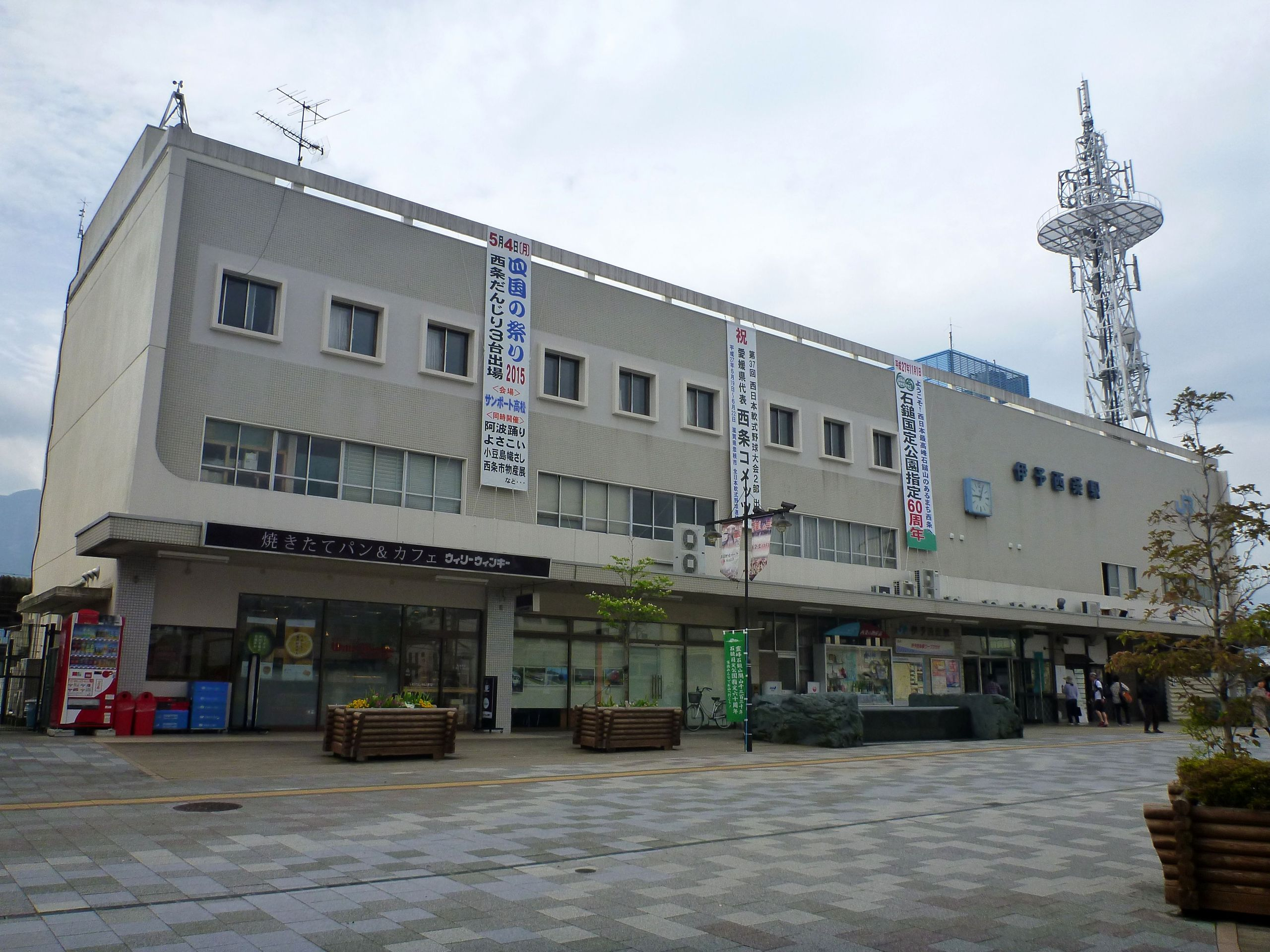
- Iyo-Saijō Station in 2015

General information
- Location: Omachi, Saijo-shi, Ehime-ken 793-0030; Japan
- Coordinates: 33°54′46″N 133°11′14″E
- Operator: JR Shikoku
- Line: ■ Yosan Line
- Distance: 114.3 km from Takamatsu
- Platforms: 1 side + 1 island platforms
- Tracks: 3 + numerous sidings

Construction
- Structure type: At grade
- Parking: Available
- Accessible: Yes - link bridge to platforms equipped with elevators

Other information
- Status: Staffed (Midori no Madoguchi)
- Station code: Y31
- Website: Official website

History
- Opened: 21 June 1921; 105 years ago

Passengers
- FY2023: 1449
Location
- Location within Ehime Prefecture Location within Japan

Iyo-Saijō Station (伊予西条駅, Iyo-Saijō-eki) is a passenger railway station located in the city of Saijō, Ehime Prefecture, Japan. It is operated by JR Shikoku and has the station number "Y31". It is the main station of the city of Saijō and a major terminal on the Yosan Line with many train services beginning or ending here.

== Lines ==
Iyo-Saijō Station is served by the JR Shikoku Yosan Line and is located 114.3 km from the beginning of the line at Takamatsu. It is the western terminal for Yosan line local trains which ply the Kan'onji - Iyo-Saijō sector. Passengers on local services continuing eastwards or westwards have to change trains. The Rapid Sunport, and Nanpū Relay which provide a through service to Takamatsu start and end here.

In addition, the following JR Shikoku limited express services also serve the station:

- Shiokaze - from Okayama to Matsuyama and Uwajima
- Ishizuchi - from Matsuyama to Takamatsu and Uwajima
- Midnight Express Takamatsu - in one direction only, starts from Takamatsu and ends here
- Morning Express Takamatsu - in one direction only, starts here for Takamatsu
- Midnight Express Matsuyama - in one direction only, from Matsuyama to Niihama
- Morning Express Matsuyama - in one direction only, from Niihama to Matsuyama

== Layout ==
The station consists of an island platform and a side platform serving three tracks. The station building houses a waiting room, shops, a JR Midori no Madoguchi ticket window and a JR Travel Centre (Warp Plaza). Car parking and rental are available. The island platform is reached by means of a bridge equipped with elevators for barrier-free access.

Numerous sidings and passing loops branch off on both sides of the station with some of them serving the Shikoku Railway Cultural Center, which has facilities both north and south of the station.

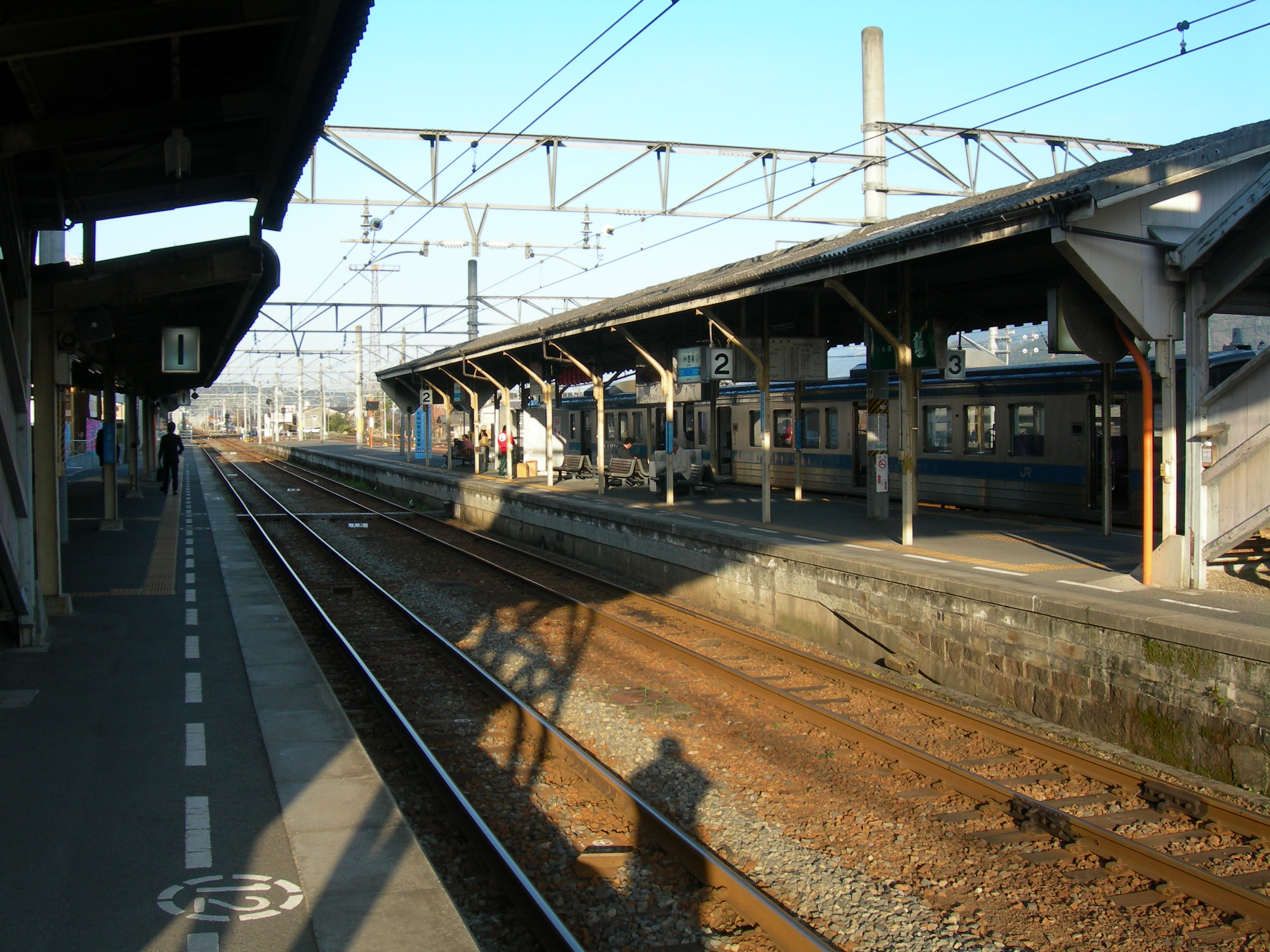
A view of the station platforms in 2008. Note the footbridge at the extreme right. It has since been replaced by a barrier-free bridge.

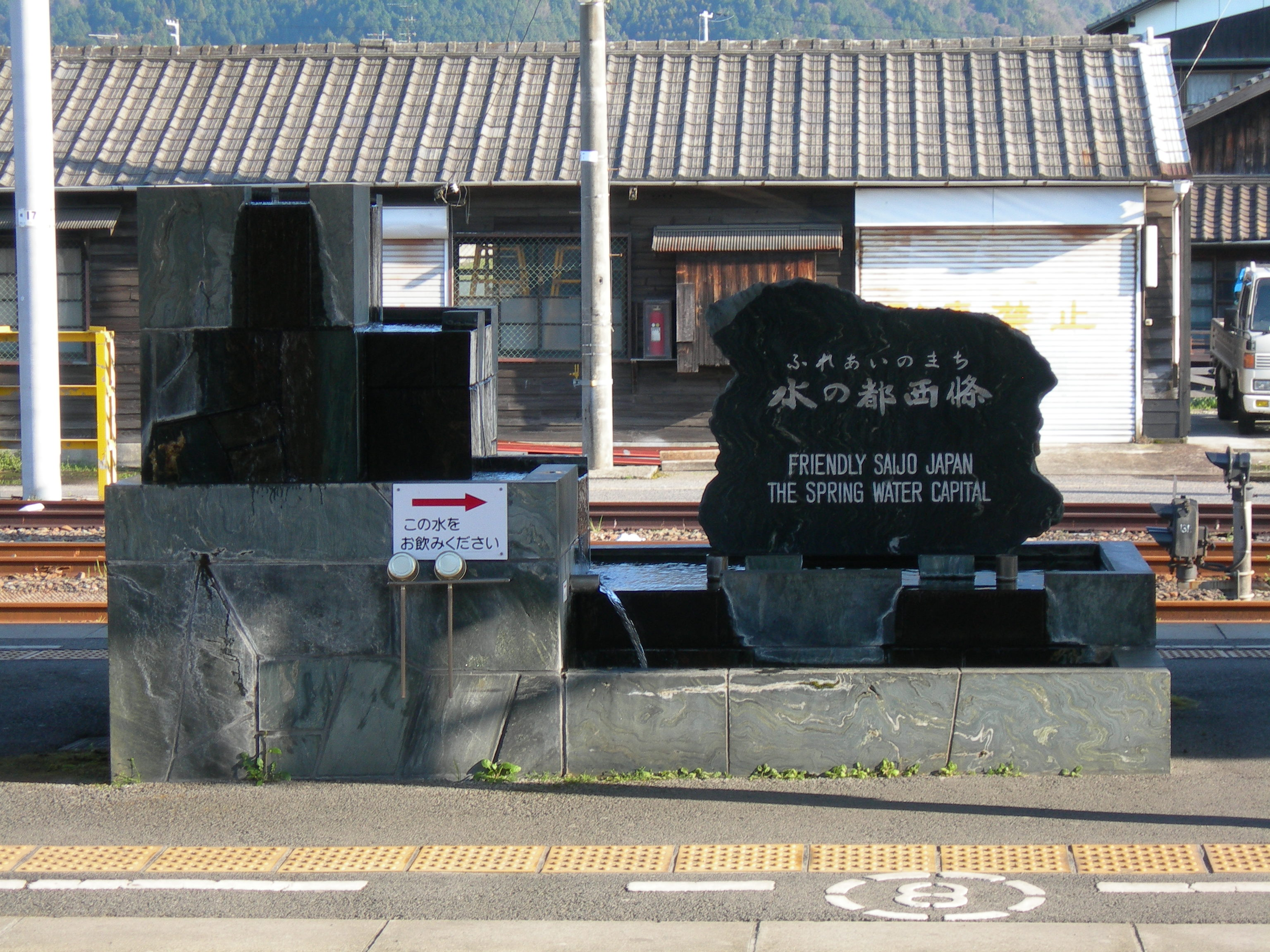
A fountain serving water from a natural spring on the island platform. The white sign says: "Please drink".

== Adjacent stations ==
«	Service	»
JR Limited Express Services
Niihama	Shiokaze	Nyūgawa
Niihama	Ishizuchi	Nyūgawa
Niihama	Midnight Express Takamatsu	Terminus
Terminus	Morning Express Takamatsu	Niihama
Nyūgawa	Midnight Express Matsuyama	Niihama
Niihama	Morning Express Matsuyama	Nyūgawa
Yosan Line
Nakahagi	Rapid Sunport	Terminus
Nakahagi	Nanpū Relay	Terminus
Nakahagi	Local	Ishizuchiyama

== History ==
The station opened on 21 June 1921 as the terminus of the then Sanuki Line which had been extended westwards from Iyo-Doi. It became a through-station on 1 May 1923 when the line was further extended to Nyūgawa. At that time the station was operated by Japanese Government Railways, later becoming Japanese National Railways (JNR). With the privatization of JNR on 1 April 1987, control of the station passed to JR Shikoku.

On 25 September 2017, JR Shikoku completed a barrier-free upgrade project for the station. The existing footbridge linking the platforms was replaced by a new bridge equipped with elevators.

== Surrounding area ==
- The Railway History Park in Saijō, a complex of three attractions next to the station:
  - Shikoku Railway Cultural Center - a railway museum with wings to the north and south of the station and features among other exhibits, a 0 Series Shinkansen and a JNR Class DF50 in working condition and kept on a siding for demonstration runs.
  - Shinji Sogō Memorial Museum - dedicated to the fourth president of JNR and credited with the creation of the Tōkaidō Shinkansen. He was also a mayor of Saijō City.
  - Saijō Tourist Information Center

== See also ==
- List of railway stations in Japan
