= JR Shikoku 2600 series =

Diesel multiple unit train operated in Japan

2600 series
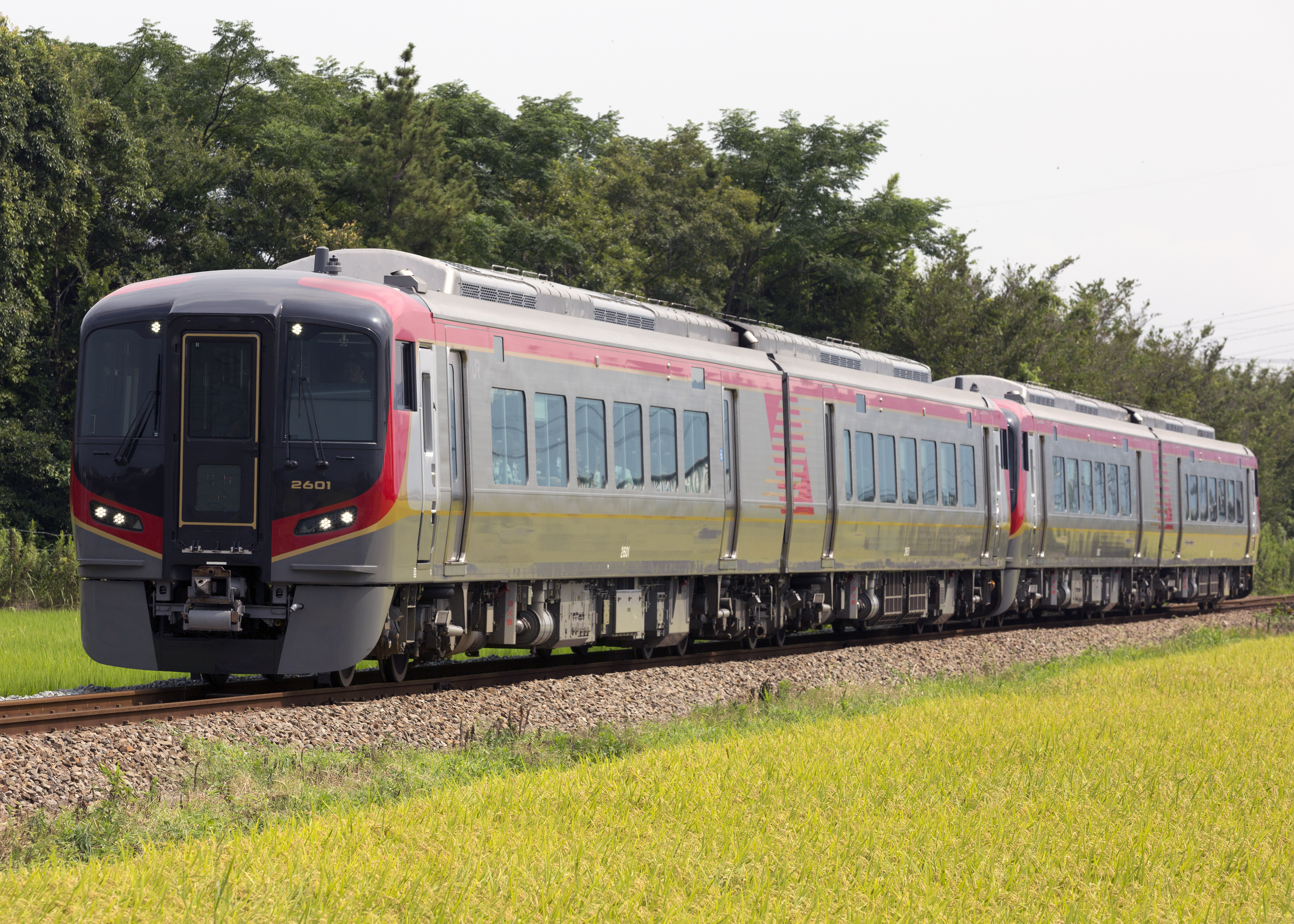
- Sets 2601 and 2602 on a special charter service in August 2017
- In service: August 2017 – present
- Manufacturer: Kawasaki Heavy Industries
- Replaced: 2000 series
- Constructed: 2016–2017
- Number built: 4 cars (2 sets)
- Number in service: 4 cars (2 sets)
- Formation: 2 cars
- Fleet numbers: 2601–2602
- Operator: JR Shikoku
- Depot: Takamatsu
- Lines served: Yosan Line, Dosan Line, Kōtoku Line

Specifications
- Car body construction: Stainless steel
- Car length: 20,800 mm (68 ft 3 in)
- Width: 2,834 mm (9 ft 3.6 in)
- Height: 3,560 mm (11 ft 8 in)
- Floor height: 1,105 mm (3 ft 7.5 in)
- Doors: 2 sliding doors per side
- Maximum speed: 120 km/h (75 mph)
- Prime mover: SA6D140HE-2 x 2 per car
- Power output: 331 kW (444 hp) per engine
- Bogies: S-DT68
- Track gauge: 1,067 mm (3 ft 6 in)

The 2600 series (2600系, 2600-kei) is a two-car tilting diesel multiple unit (DMU) train type operated by Shikoku Railway Company (JR Shikoku) in Japan since August 2017 on limited express services in Shikoku.

== Design ==
The trains are built by Kawasaki Heavy Industries to a "Neo Japonisme" concept, combining traditional Japanese craftsmanship with modern styling. The trains operate at a maximum speed of 120 km/h (75 mph) in service.

The trains use the same pneumatic tilt system as the 8600 series EMU trains (instead of the pendulum system used in the older 2000 series trains) to allow faster speeds on curves. The train features a database of curves along the line, allowing the train to begin tilting before reaching the curve.

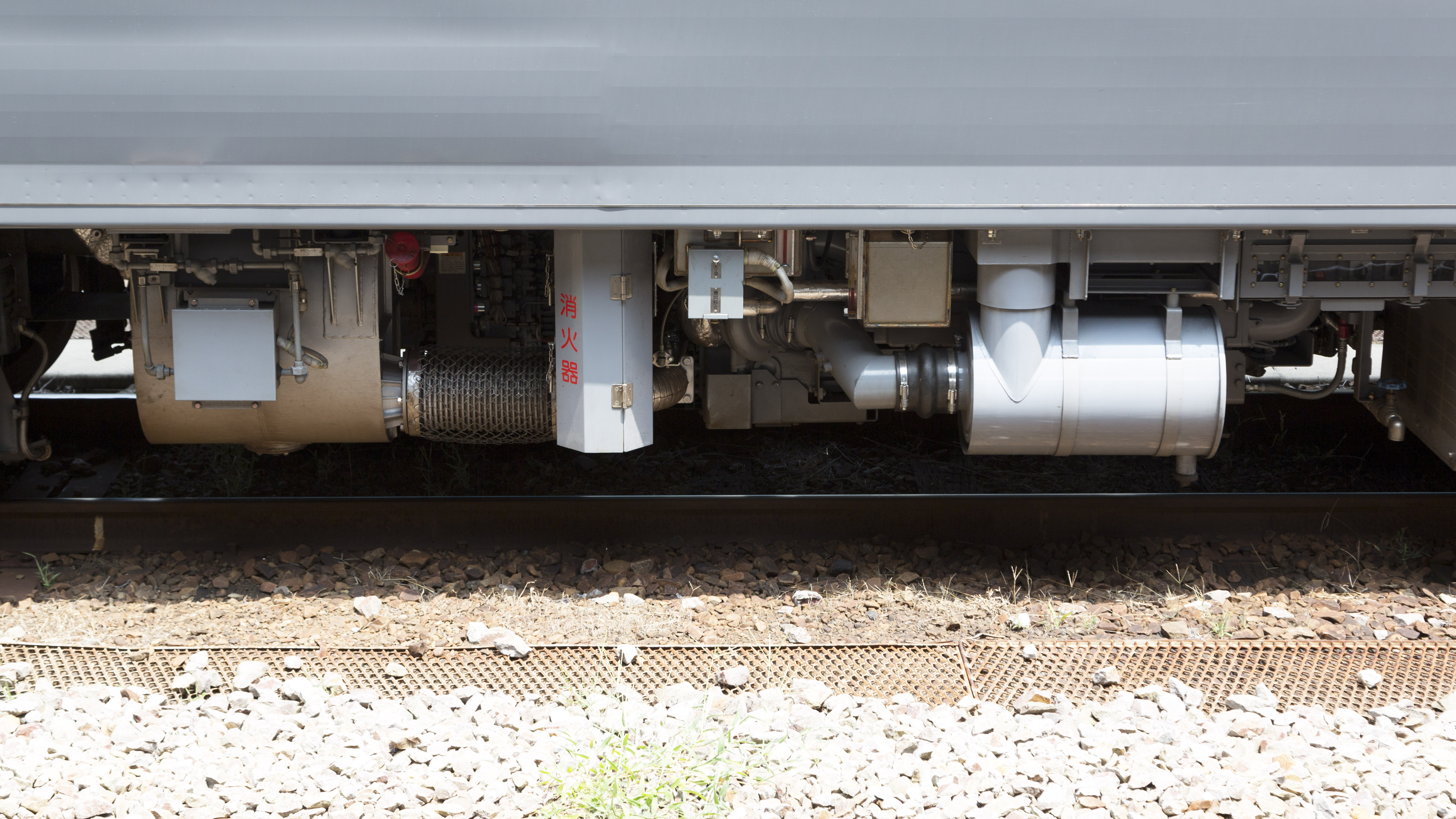
One of the underfloor SA6D140HE-2 diesel engines

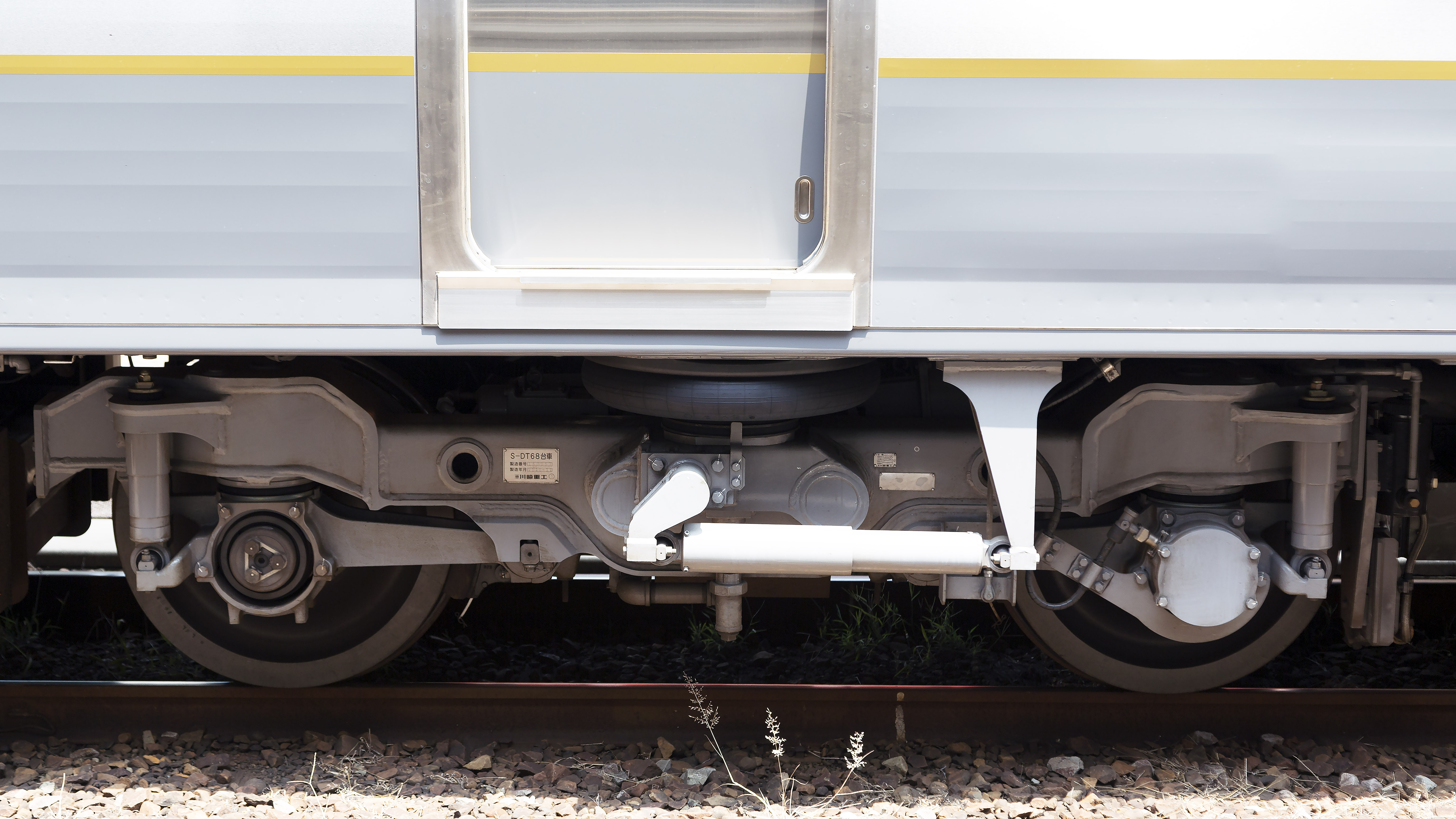
An S-DT68 bogie

== Operations ==
The 2600 series trains are used on the Yosan Line, Dosan Line, and Kōtoku Line from December 2017, replacing the ageing 2000 series DMU trains.

== Formation ==
The trains are formed as two-car sets, with both cars powered (one axle per bogie).

Designation	Mc	Mc'
Numbering	260x	265x
Capacity	46	52
Weight (t)	49.1	49.1

== Interior ==
Passenger accommodation consists of ordinary-class 2+2 abreast reclining seats, with the same seat design as used on the 8600 series EMU trains. Each seat is provided with an AC power outlet. The Mc car has maroon colour seat covers, while the Mc' car has dark blue seat covers. The Mc' car has a toilet, while the Mc car includes a wheelchair space and universal access toilet. LED lighting is used throughout.

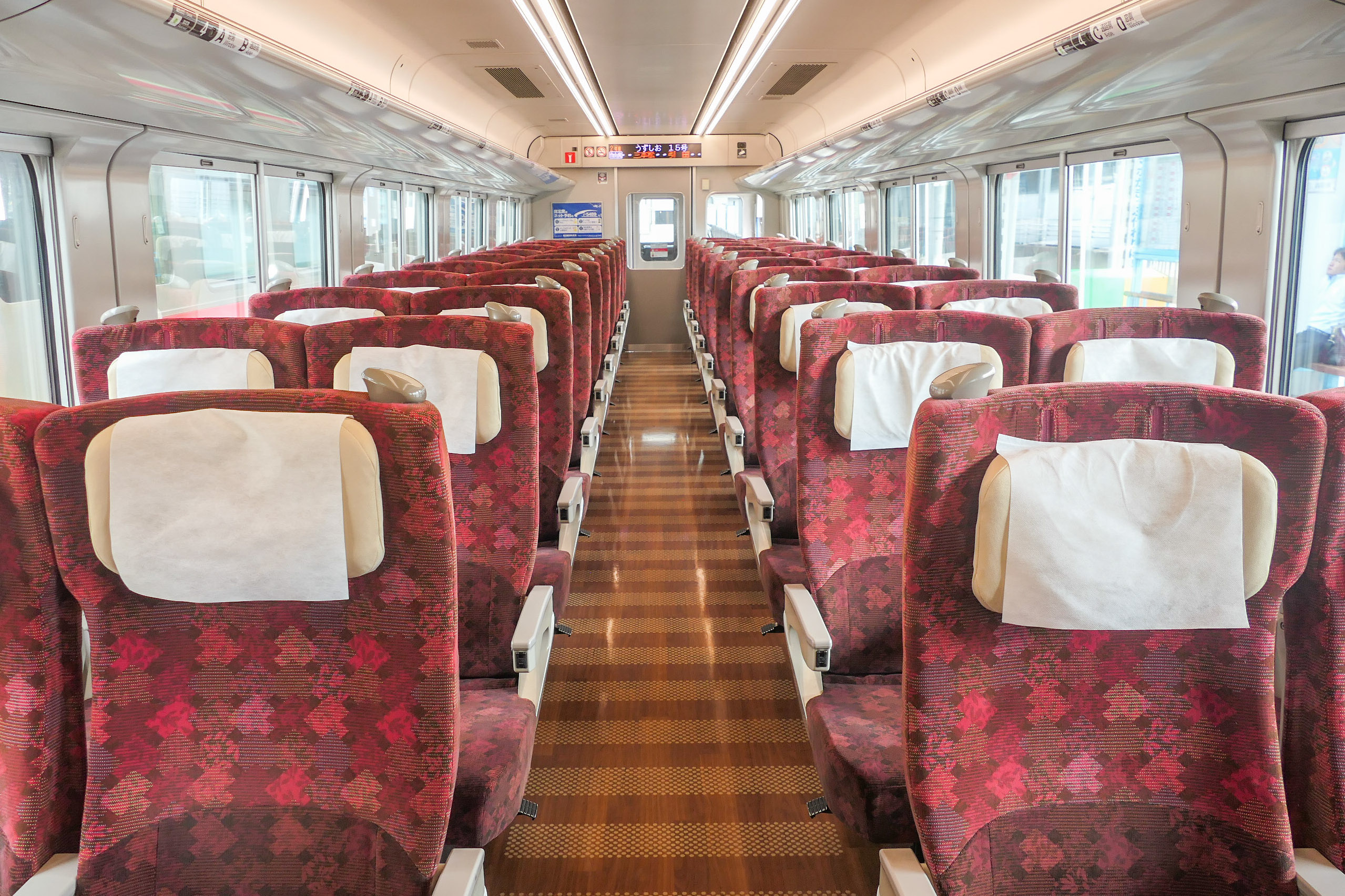
Interior (Mc)

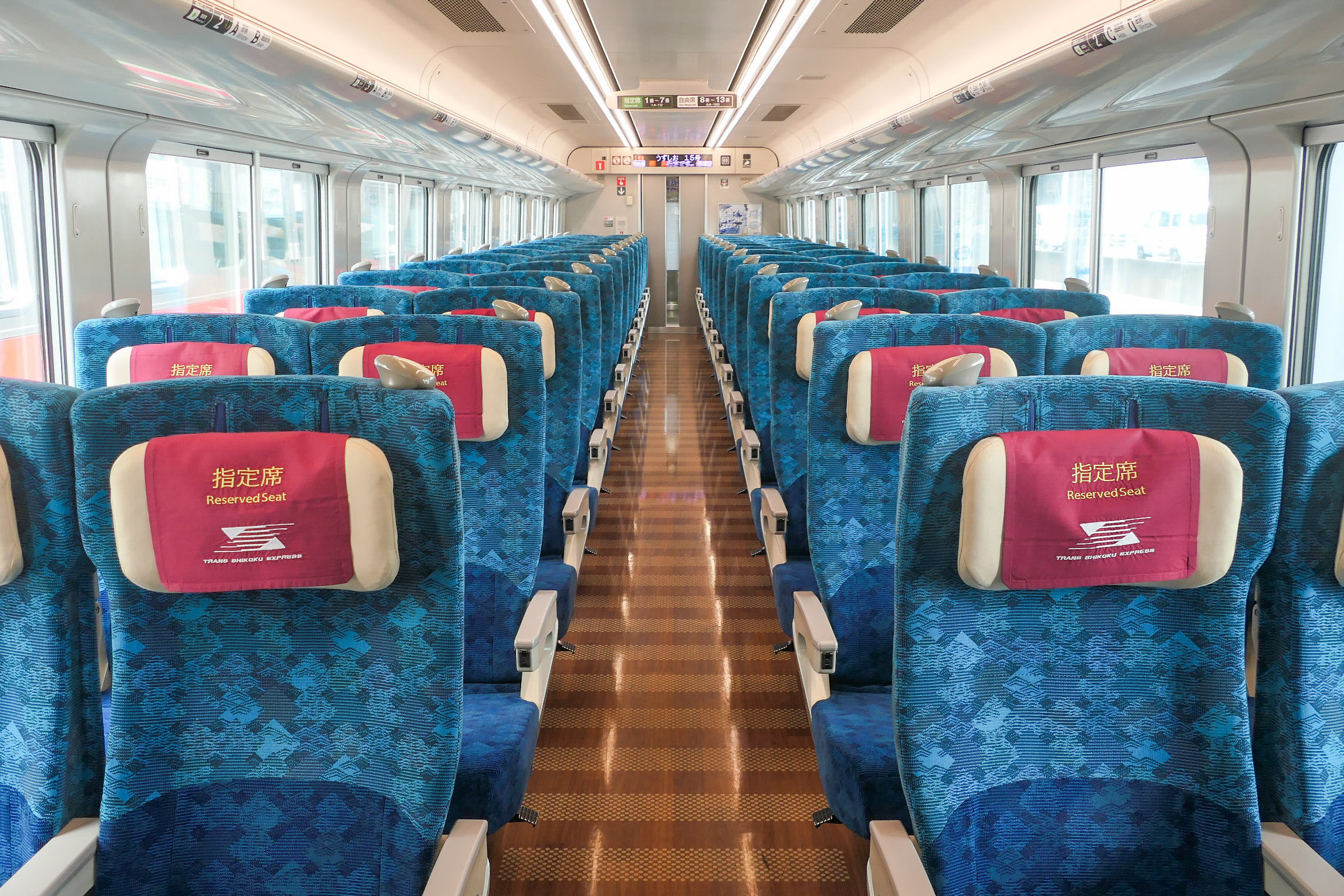
Interior (Mc')

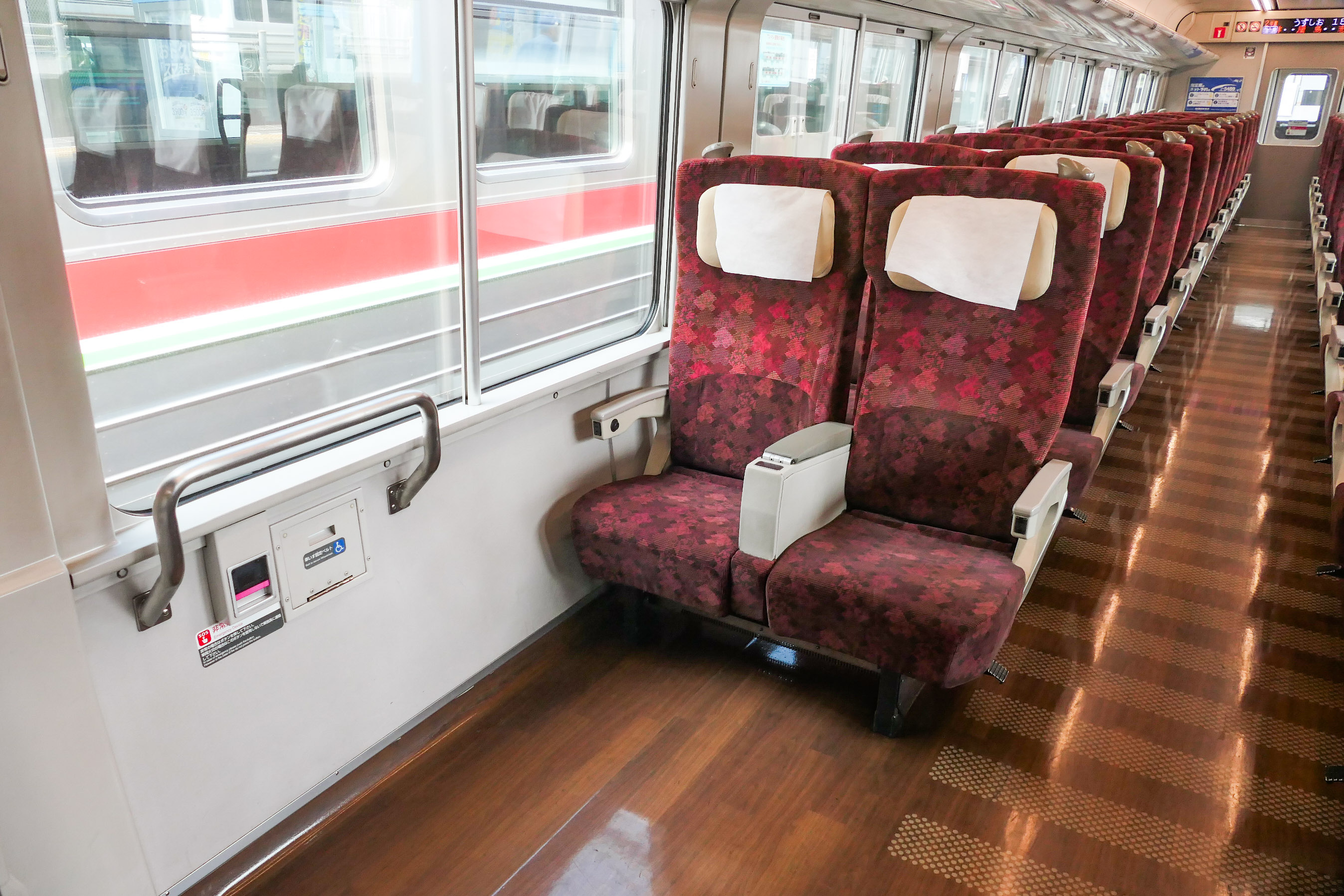
Wheelchair space

== History ==
Details of the new trains were officially announced on 30 January 2017. The first two trainsets were delivered from the Kawasaki Heavy Industries factory in Kobe to Takamatsu Depot in February 2017.

Regular revenue service commenced on 2 December 2017, but prior to this, the sets were first used in revenue service on 11 August 2017 on a special charter service between Takamatsu and Tokushima. From 12 to 15 August 2017, the two sets were also used on additional seasonal Awadori limited express services operating between Takamatsu and Tokushima.

== Future developments ==
In September 2017, JR Shikoku announced that the pneumatic tilting system used on the trains did not operate effectively, and future trains built based on the 2600 series design would use a pendular tilting system instead. This led to the development of the 2700 series, which was first announced in 2018, and entered revenue service on 6 August 2019.
