= 8600 =

8600 may refer to:

- The year 8600, in the 9th millennium.
- NVIDIA GeForce 8600, a computer graphics card series
- 8600 series, a Japanese train type
- Nokia 8600 Luna, a mobile phone released in 2007
