= Shikoku Railway Company =

Japanese railway company

- Native name: 四国旅客鉄道株式会社
- Romanized name: Shikoku Ryokaku Tetsudō kabushiki gaisha
- Type: State-owned
- Industry: Private railway
- Predecessor: Japanese National Railways (JNR)
- Founded: 1 April 1987 (privatization of JNR)
- Headquarters: Takamatsu, Japan
- Area served: Shikoku
- Key people: Masafumi Izumi (CEO)
- Revenue: ¥31.4 billion (2007)
- Total assets: ¥357.1 billion (2007)
- Total equity: ¥3.5 billion
- Owner: Japan Railway Construction, Transport and Technology Agency
- Number of employees: 2,942 (2007)
- Subsidiaries: JR Shikoku Bus
- Website: jr-shikoku.co.jp

The Shikoku Railway Company, (Note: Japanese: 四国旅客鉄道株式会社, Hepburn: Shikoku Ryokaku Tetsudō Kabushiki-gaisha; lit. 'Shikoku Passenger Railway Company') commonly known as JR Shikoku, (Note: JR四国, Jei-āru Shikoku) is the smallest of the seven companies of the Japan Railways Group (JR Group). It operates 855.2 kilometres (531.4 mi) of intercity and local rail services in the four prefectures on the island of Shikoku in Japan. The company has its headquarters in Takamatsu.

== Lines ==
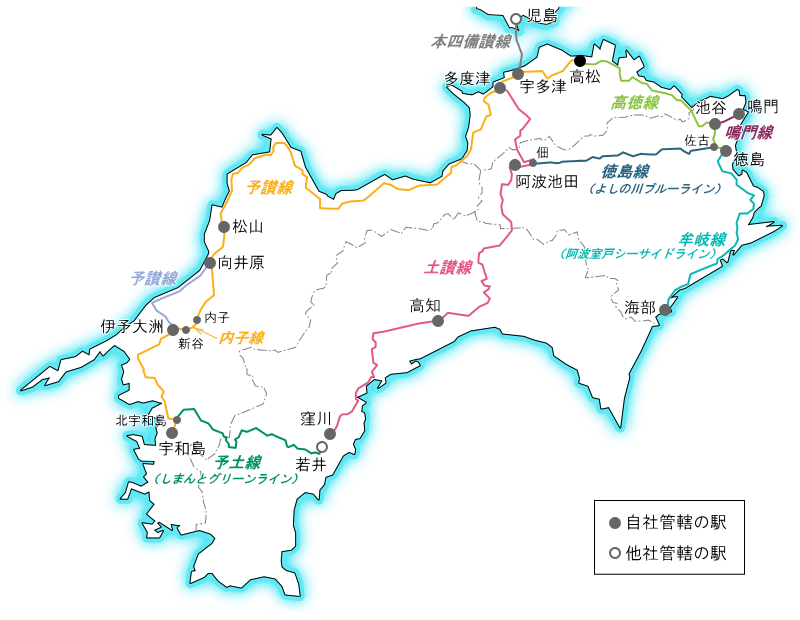
JR Shikoku railway network

In 1988 JR Shikoku, unlike other JR companies, discontinued the classification of its rail lines as either main, secondary, or branch lines. Prior to the change, the Dosan, Kōtoku, Tokushima, and Yosan Lines had all been main lines.

Each line is color-coded and labeled with a letter, in conjunction with which a number is assigned to each station on the line. For example, Naruto Station on the Naruto Line (labeled N) is numbered N10. Although this method is now widely used by rail companies, especially metro systems in Japan, JR Shikoku was the first JR company to adopt it.

Color	Abbr.	Line		Termini
Main Lines
None		Honshi Bisan Line (Note: Part of the Seto-Ōhashi Line connecting Okayama to Shikoku via the Great Seto Bridge.)		Kojima – Utazu
	Y	Yosan Line	Main Line	Takamatsu – Matsuyama
	U	Yosan Line	Main Line	Matsuyama – Mukaibara
	U	Yosan Line	Branch Line (New Line)	Mukaibara – Uchiko
	U	Uchiko Line		Uchiko – Niiya
	U	Yosan Line	Branch Line (New Line)	Niiya – Iyo-Ōzu
	U	Yosan Line	Main Line	Iyo-Ōzu – Uwajima
	S	Yosan Line	Main Line (Old Line)	Mukaibara – Iyo-Ōzu
	T	Kōtoku Line		Takamatsu – Tokushima
	D	Dosan Line		Tadotsu – Kōchi
	K	Dosan Line		Kōchi – Kubokawa
	B	Tokushima Line		Tsukuda – Sako
Other Lines
	M	Mugi Line		Tokushima – Kaifu
	N	Naruto Line		Ikenotani – Naruto
	G	Yodo Line		Wakai – Kita-Uwajima

== Train services ==
JR Shikoku provides intercity transportation with its limited express services, connecting major cities on the island of Shikoku with Okayama on Honshū. The company also operates local trains.

Major named trains of JR Shikoku
Type	Name	Endpoints and major intermediate stations (Stations not owned by JR Shikoku in parentheses)	Train type
Limited; Express	Ashizuri	Kōchi – (Nakamura) – (Sukumo)	2000 series DMU, 2700 series DMU
Limited; Express	Ishizuchi	Takamatsu – Matsuyama	8000 series EMU, 8600 series EMU
Limited; Express	Muroto	Tokushima – Anan – Kaifu	KiHa 185 series DMU
Limited; Express	Nanpū	(Okayama) – Awa-Ikeda – Kōchi	2700 series DMU
Limited; Express	Uwakai	Matsuyama – Uwajima	2000 series DMU
Limited; Express	Uzushio	(Okayama) – Takamatsu – Tokushima	KiHa 185 series DMU, 2600 series DMU, 2700 series DMU
Limited; Express	Shimanto	Takamatsu – Awa-Ikeda – Kōchi	2700 series DMU
Limited; Express	Shiokaze	(Okayama) – Matsuyama	8000 series EMU, 8600 series EMU
Limited; Express	Tsurugisan	Tokushima – Anabuki – Awa-Ikeda	KiHa 185 series DMU
Limited; Express	Sunrise Seto	(Tokyo) – (Okayama) – Takamatsu	285 series EMU sleeper (operated by JR West and JR Central)
Rapid	Marine Liner	(Okayama) – Takamatsu	5000 series EMU (operated by JR Shikoku); 223-5000 series EMU (operated by JR West)

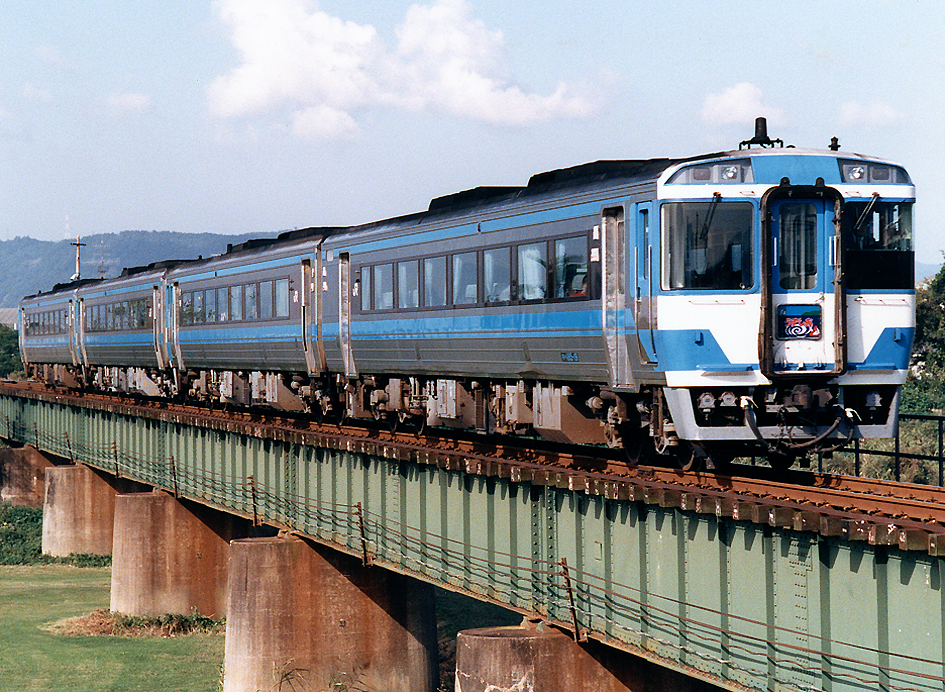
185 series DMU used for limited express services

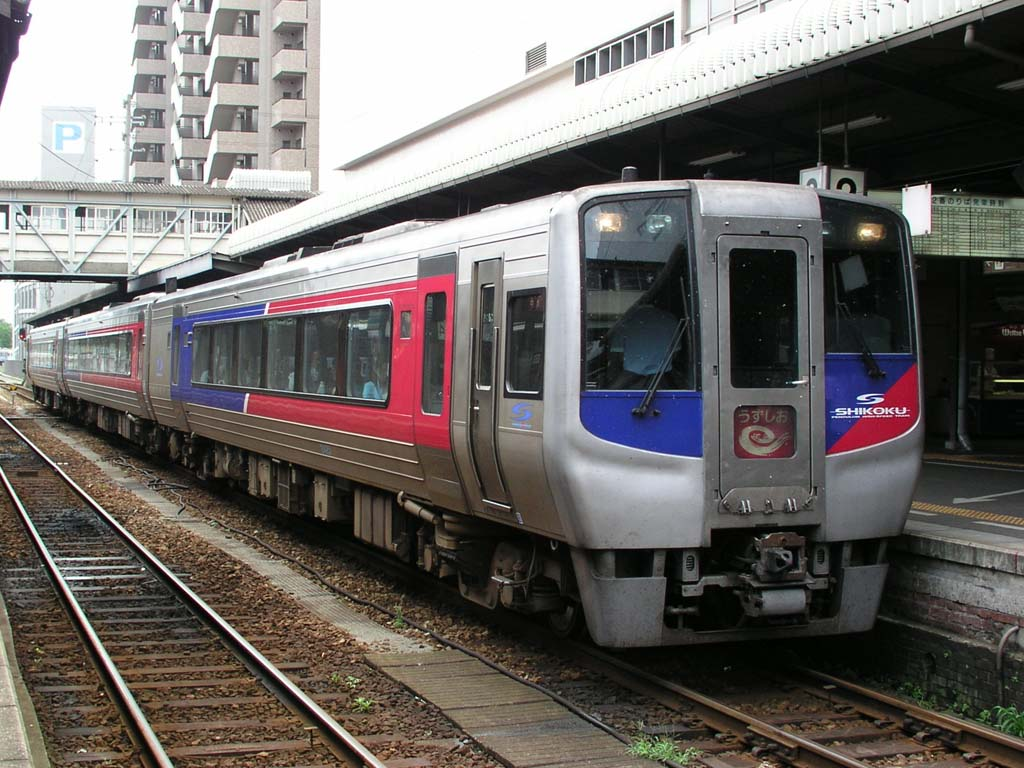
2000 series DMU used for limited express services

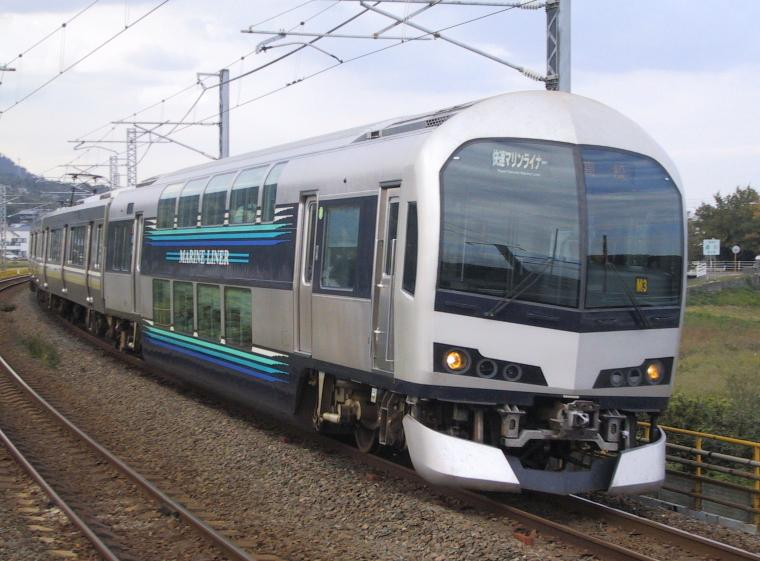
5000 series EMU used for Marine Liner rapid services

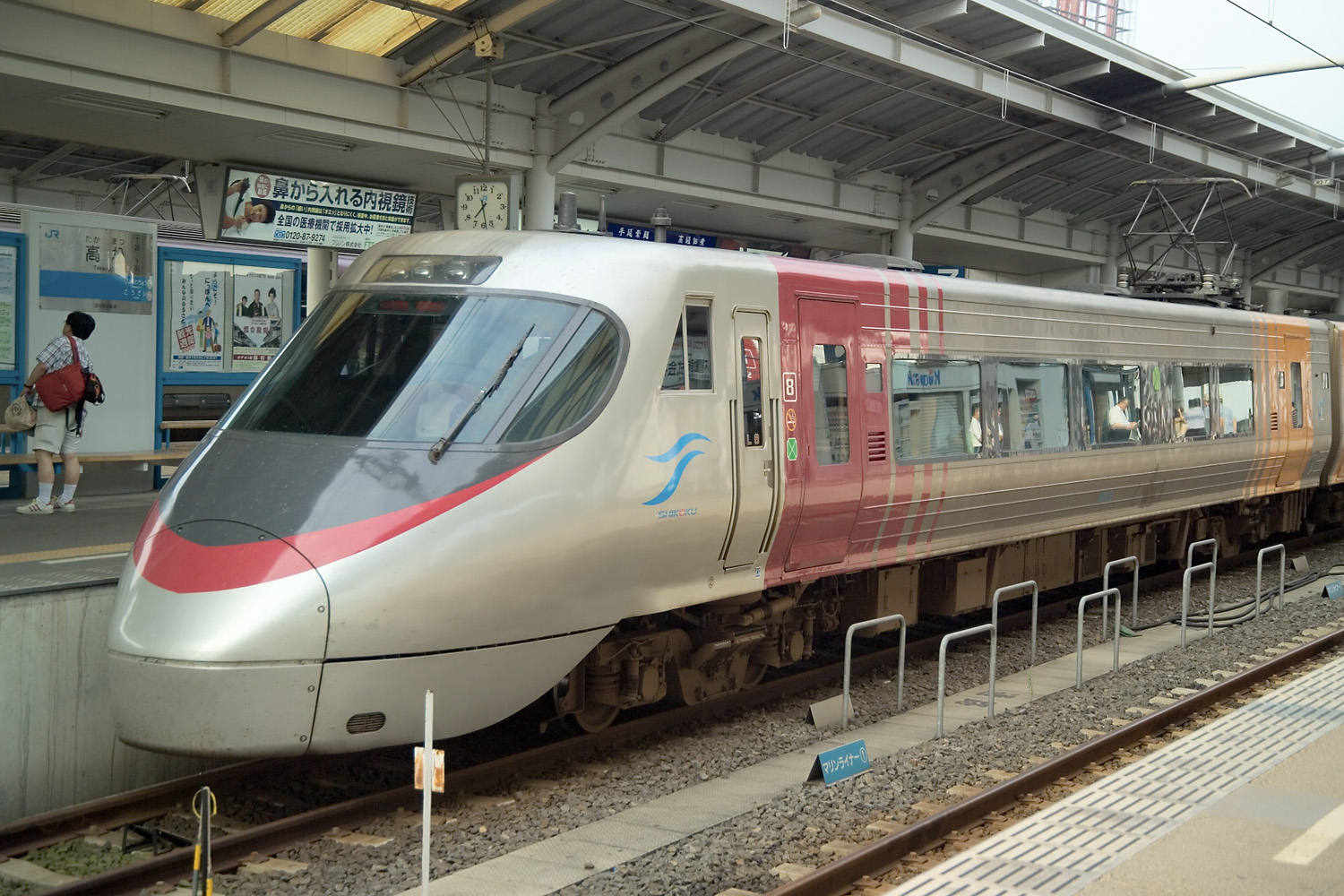
8000 series EMU used for limited express services
