= JR Shikoku 8000 series =

Japanese train type

8000 series
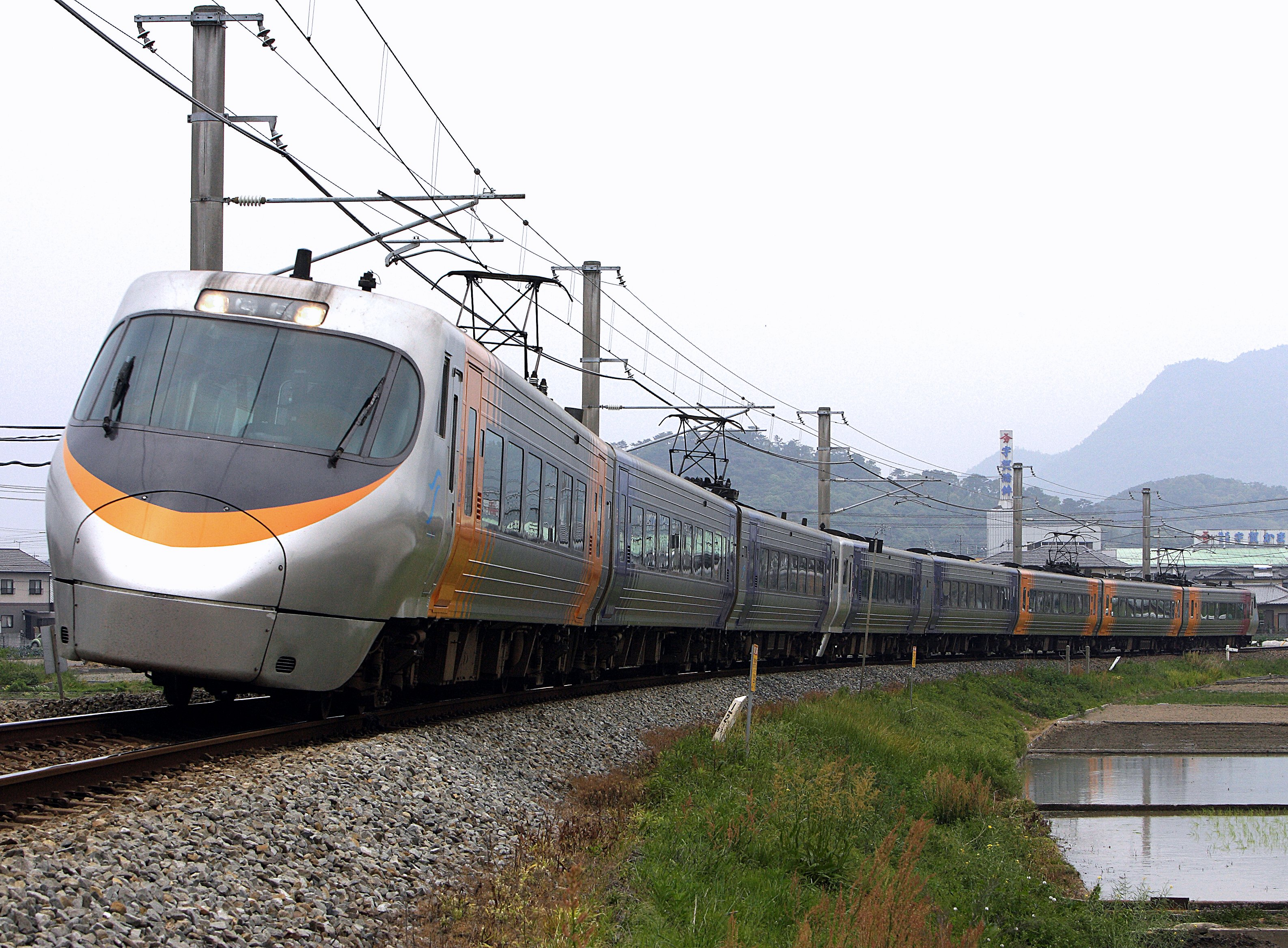
- 8000 series on a Shiokaze service in May 2007
- Manufacturers: Hitachi, Nippon Sharyo
- Constructed: 1992–1997
- Entered service: 1992
- Refurbished: 2004–2006 (first); 2023– (second)
- Number built: 48 vehicles (12 sets)
- Number in service: 45 vehicles (11 sets)
- Formation: 3/5 cars per trainset
- Fleet numbers: L1–6, S1–6
- Capacity: 281 (5-car sets L1–L5); 277 (5-car set L6); 168 (3-car sets)
- Operator: JR Shikoku
- Depot: Matsuyama

Specifications
- Car length: 22,600 mm (74 ft 2 in)
- Width: 2,820 mm (9 ft 3 in)
- Height: 3,360 mm (11 ft 0 in)
- Floor height: 1,105 mm (3 ft 7.5 in)
- Doors: Plug doors (2 per side)
- Maximum speed: 130 km/h (80 mph)
- Traction system: Variable frequency; GTO (as built); SiC-IGBT hybrid module (second refurbishment)
- Current collection: Overhead catenary
- Safety system: ATS-SS
- Track gauge: 1,067 mm (3 ft 6 in)

The 8000 series (8000系) is a tilting limited express electric multiple unit (EMU) train operated by Shikoku Railway Company (JR Shikoku) in Shikoku, Japan, since 1992.

== Operations ==
- Ishizuchi
- Shiokaze

== Formations ==
As of 1 October 2013, 48 vehicles were in service, formed as 3- and 5-car sets, as shown below.

=== 3-car sets ===
==== Prototype set S1 ====
Car No.	6	7	8
Designation	Mc	M	Tc1
Numbering	8201	8101	8501

Cars 6 and 8 are each fitted with one S-PS59 lozenge-type pantograph. The pantograph on car 8 was removed in 2010. This set were retired from service by March 2018.

==== Sets S2–S6 ====
Car No.	6	7	8
Designation	Mc	T	Tc1
Numbering	8200	8300	8500

Cars 6 and 8 are each fitted with one S-PS59 lozenge-type pantograph. The pantograph on car 8 was removed between 2010 and 2011. Car 7 is removed from formations during off-peak seasons between 2011 and 2018.

=== 5-car sets L1–L6 ===
Car No.	1	2	3	4	5
Designation	Thsc	M1	M2	T	Tc2
Numbering	8000	8100	8150	8300	8400

- Half of car 1 includes Green car (first class) seating. Cars 1 and 3 are each fitted with one S-PS59 lozenge-type pantograph.
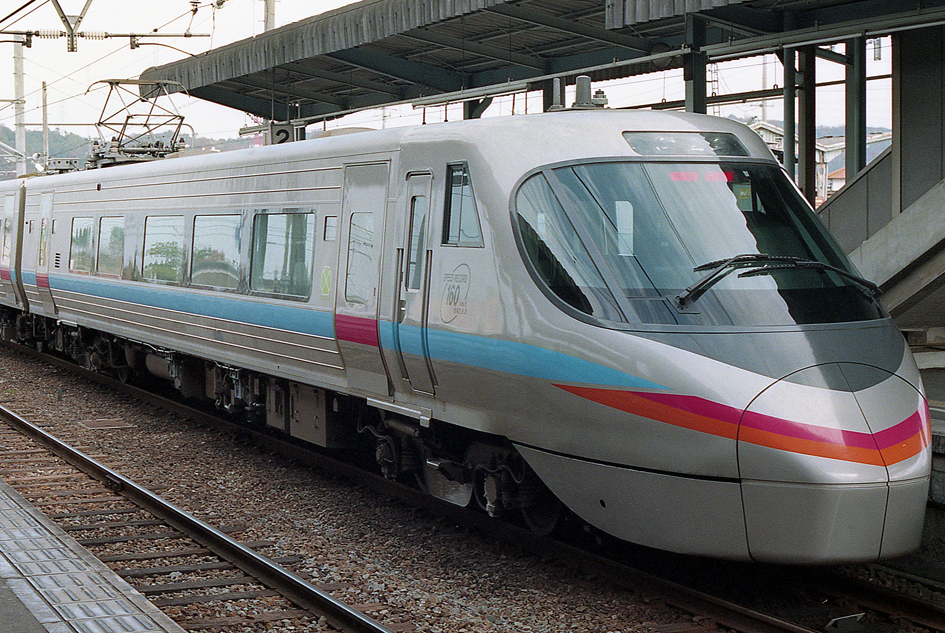
Streamlined end of set 8001 in original livery, 1992

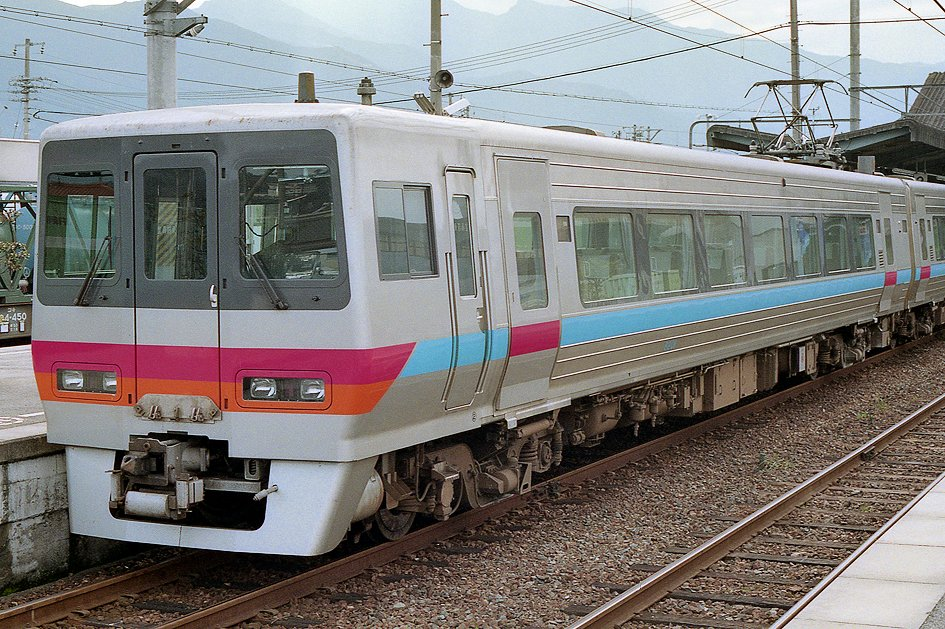
Gangwayed end of set 8201 in original livery, 1992

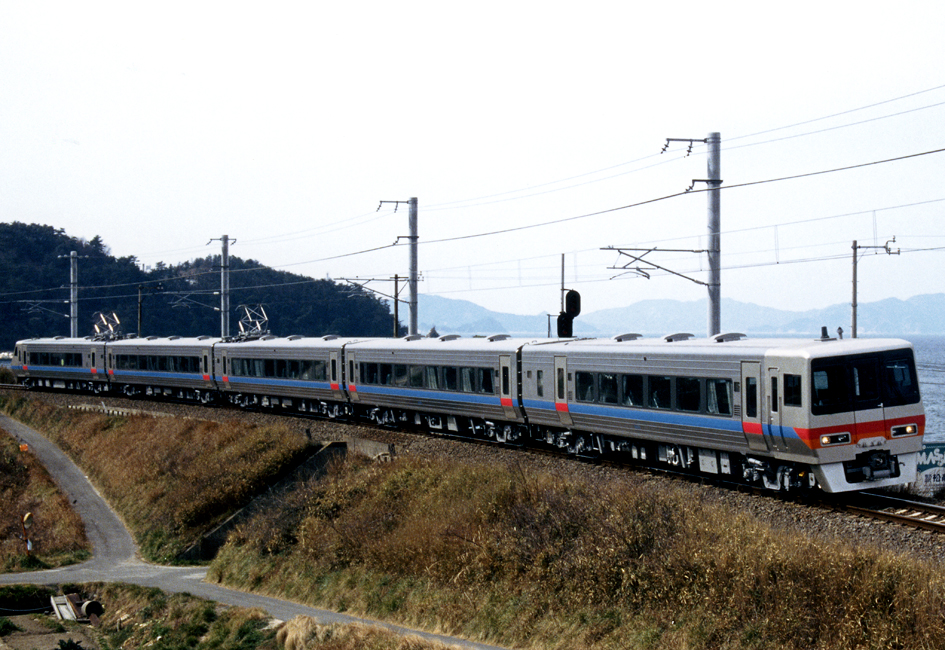
A 5-car set in original livery, 1992

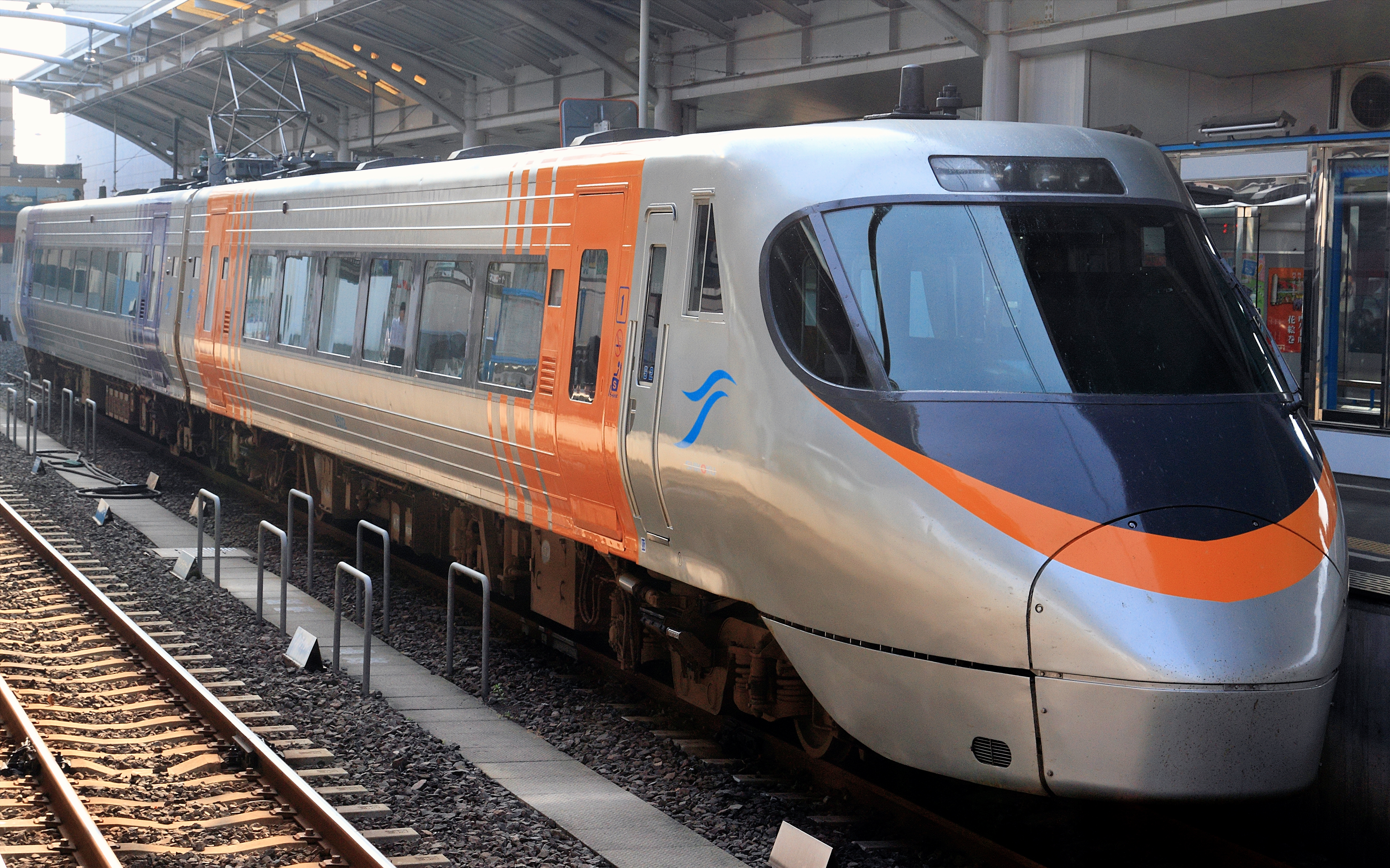
Set S2 in revised livery, 2011

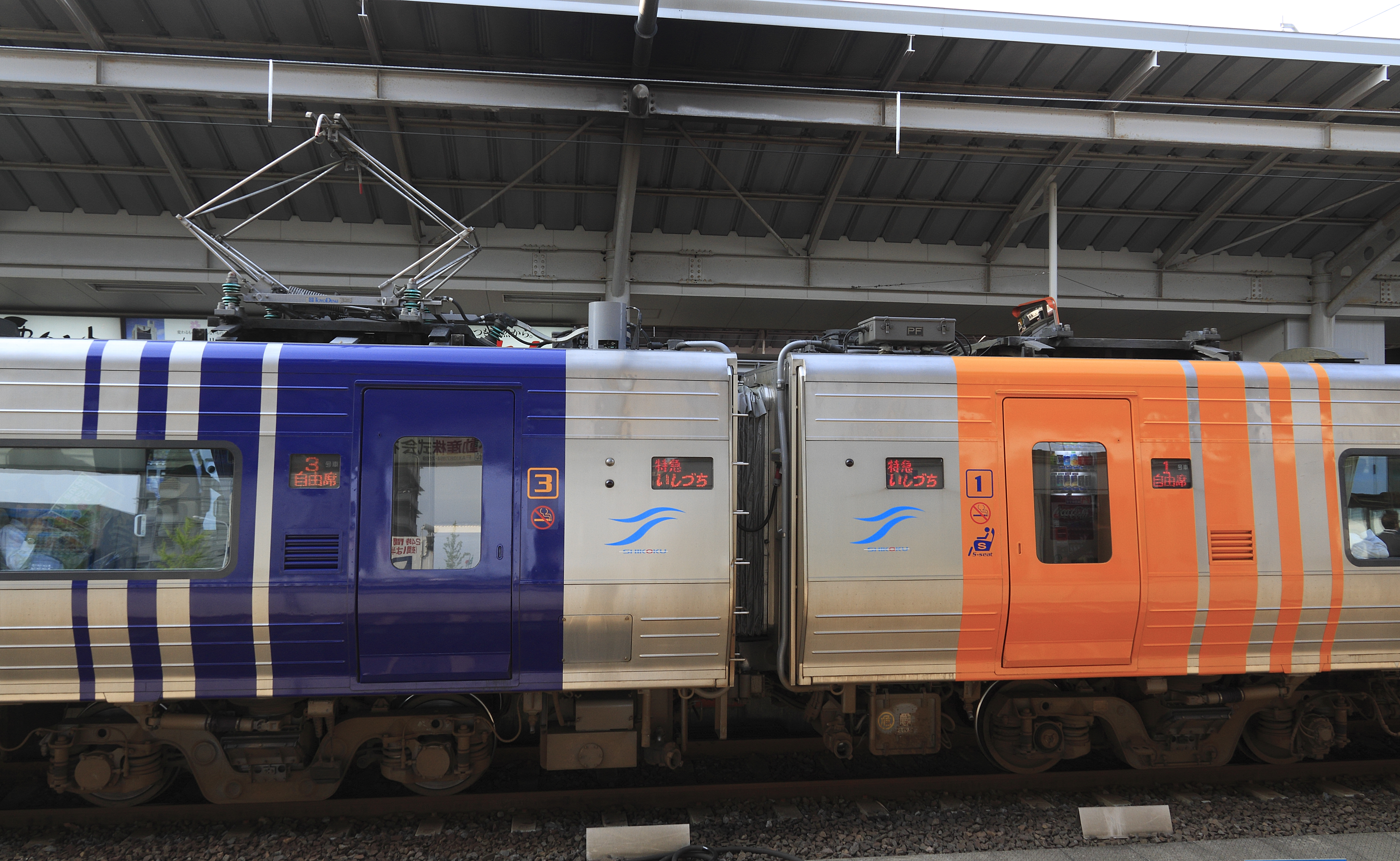
Car 1 with pantograph removed, 2011

== History ==
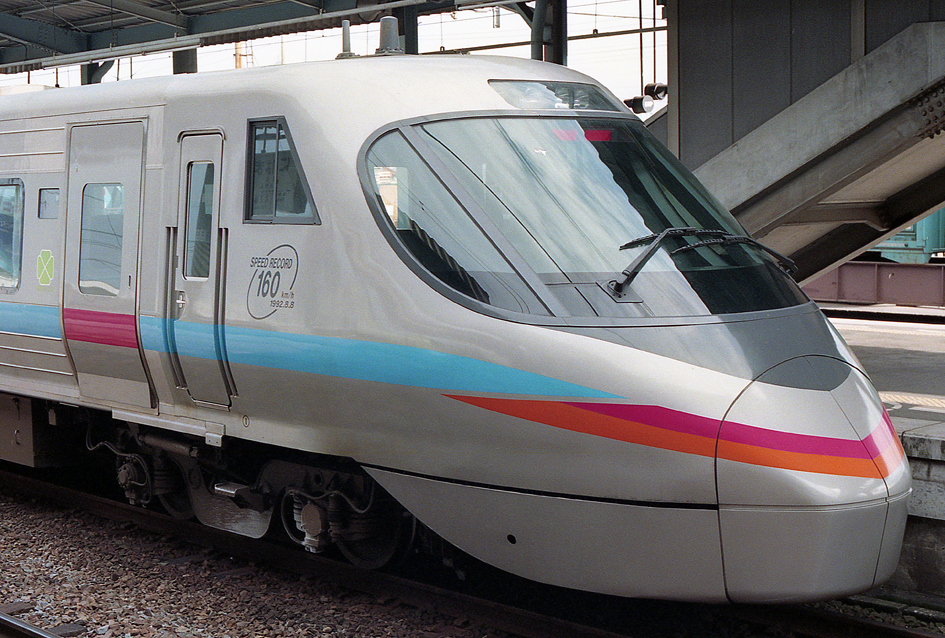
Set 8001 with a sticker commemorating its test run, 1992

The prototype set, S1, was delivered in May 1992, and entered revenue service on 19 September 1992.

On 8 August 1992, set 8001 achieved a speed of 160 km/h (99 mph) in a special test run.

The subsequent fleet of full-production sets entered service from 18 March 1993.

The entire fleet underwent life-extension refurbishment between 2004 and 2006.

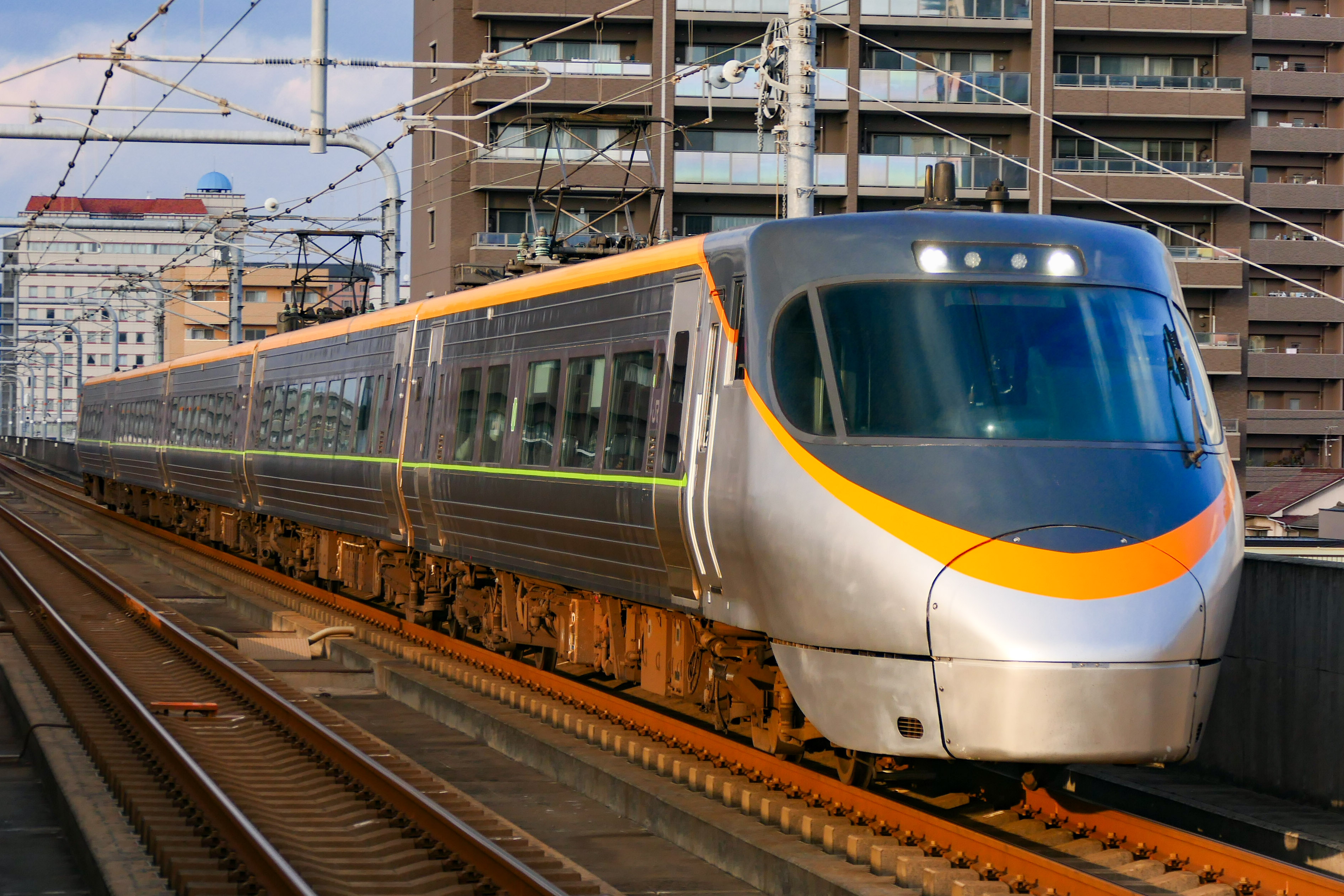
Twice-refurbished 8000 series set in December 2024

Beginning in 2023, the fleet underwent another programme of refurbishment. Refurbished sets received a new livery based on that of the newer 8600 series, as well as wheelchair spaces, power outlets, reupholstered seats, updated traction equipment, and Western-style toilets. In addition, smoking compartments were removed. Treated "S" sets entered revenue service from 23 December 2023, and treated "L" sets entered service from 2 August 2024. The entire fleet is planned to be refurbished by 2027 at a pace of two to three sets per year.

== Livery variations ==
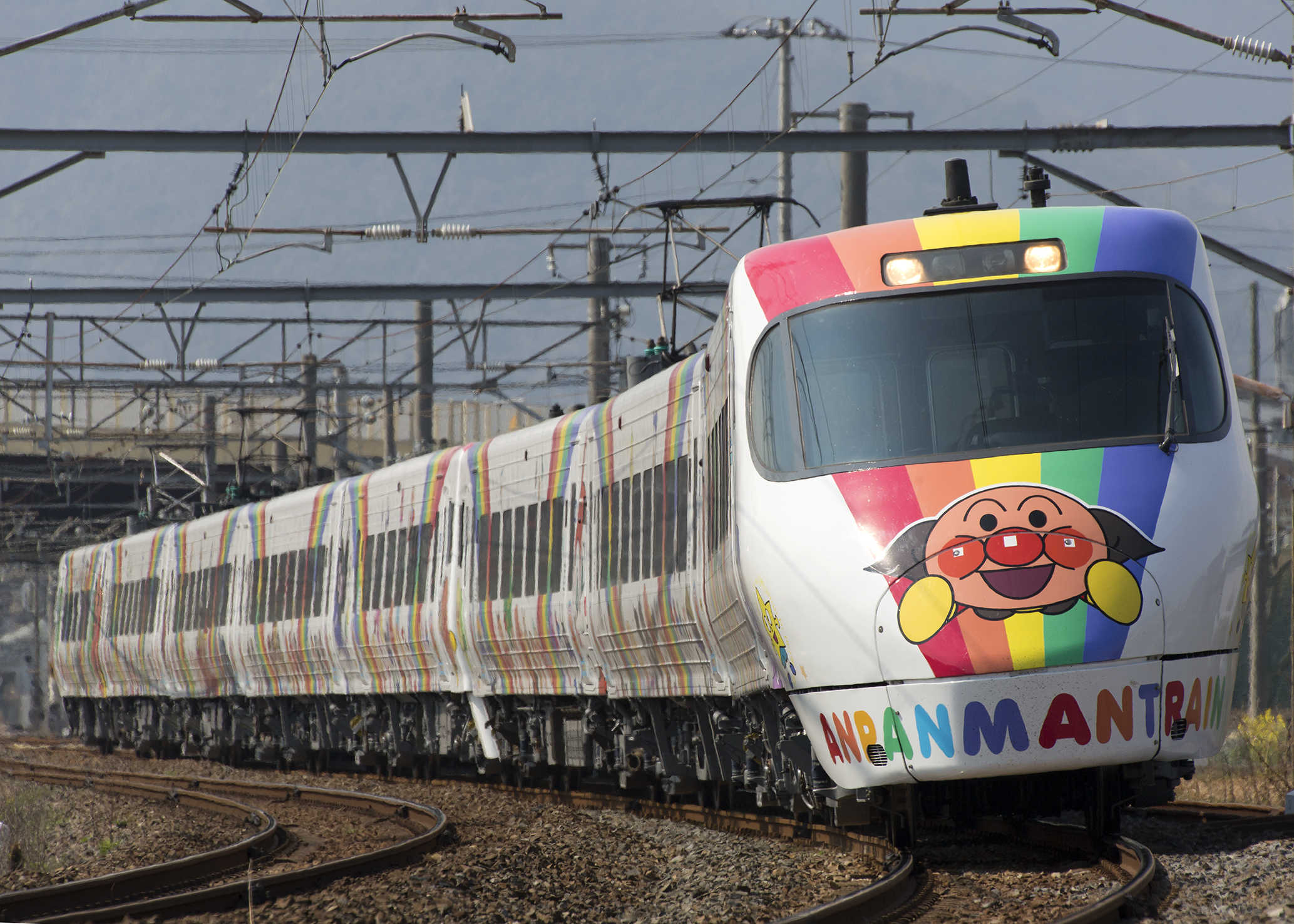
An 8000 series EMU in Anpanman livery in March 2016

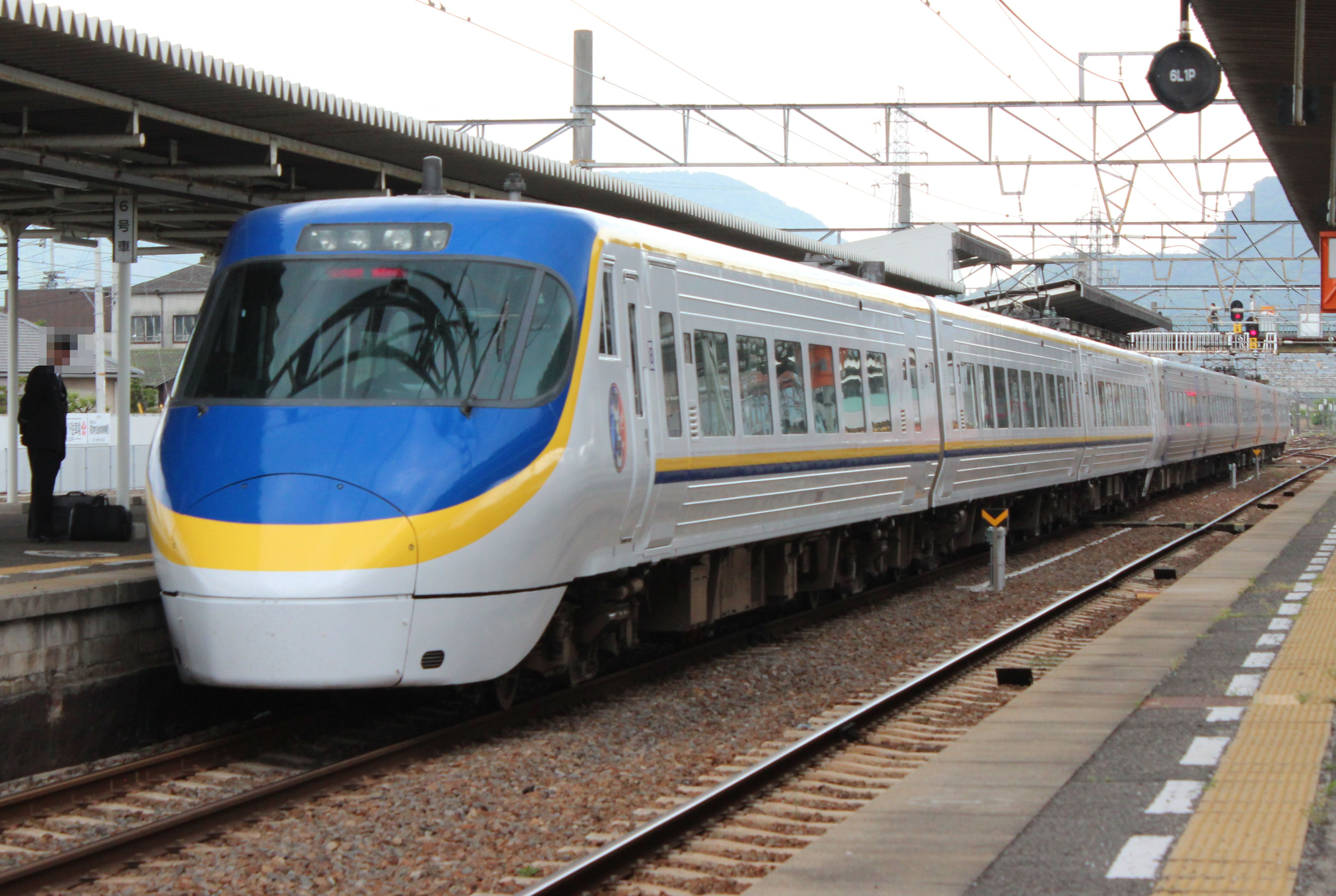
An 8000 series set in May 2017 repainted in Taiwan Railways Administration EMU800-style livery
