= 8600 series =

Japanese train type

- Set E14 leading three coupled trainsets on a combined Ishizuchi and Shiokaze service in November 2026
- In service: 23 June 2014 – present
- Manufacturer: Kawasaki Heavy Industries
- Built at: Kobe
- Replaced: 2000 series, 8000 series
- Constructed: 2014–2018
- Number built: 17 vehicles (7 sets)
- Formation: 2/3 cars per set
- Fleet numbers: E1–E3, E11–E14
- Capacity: 153 (3 car sets); 101 (2 car sets)
- Operator: JR Shikoku
- Depot: Matsuyama Depot
- Line served: Yosan Line

Specifications
- Car body construction: Stainless steel
- Car length: 20,800 mm (68 ft 3 in)
- Width: 2,834 mm (9 ft 3.6 in)
- Height: 3,560 mm (11 ft 8 in)
- Floor height: 1,105 mm (3 ft 7.5 in)
- Doors: 2 per side
- Maximum speed: 130 km/h (81 mph) (service); 140 km/h (87 mph) (design)
- Power output: 220 kW x 4 per set
- Electric system: 1,500 V DC
- Current collection: Overhead catenary
- Bogies: S-DT66 (motored); S-TR66 (trailer)
- Track gauge: 1,067 mm (3 ft 6 in)

The 8600 series (8600系) is a tilting limited express electric multiple unit (EMU) train type operated by Shikoku Railway Company (JR Shikoku) in Shikoku, Japan, on Ishizuchi limited express services between Takamatsu and Matsuyama since June 2014, replacing ageing 2000 series diesel multiple unit trains. A total of 17 vehicles were delivered by February 2018, replacing all diesel units on the route.

== Design ==
The trains are built by Kawasaki Heavy Industries to a "retro-future" concept, with black front ends intended to evoke images of a steam locomotive. The exterior livery includes orange and green highlights evoking the satsuma oranges and olives for which the region is famous. Each vehicle is built at a cost of approximately 250 million yen, financed partially by national infrastructure investment subsidies. The trains operate at a maximum speed of 130 kilometres per hour (81 mph) in service, although they have a maximum design capability of 140 km/h (87 mph). Tilting capability enables the trains to negotiate curves with a radius of 600 metres (2,000 ft) or more at a speed 30 km/h (19 mph) higher than the limit for conventional non-tilting trains.

== Formations ==
=== Three-car sets E1–E3 ===
The three-car sets, numbered E1 to E3, include "Green" car (first class) accommodation in half of one car, and are formed as follows, with one motored car and two non-powered trailer cars.

Designation	Mc	T	Tsc
Numbering	8600	8800	8700
Weight (t)	41.9	32.1	39.0
Capacity	56	68	12 green + 17 ordinary
Facilities	Vending machine, toilets		Green car seating, wheelchair space, toilets

The "Tsc" car is fitted with a single-arm pantograph.

=== Two-car sets E11–E14 ===
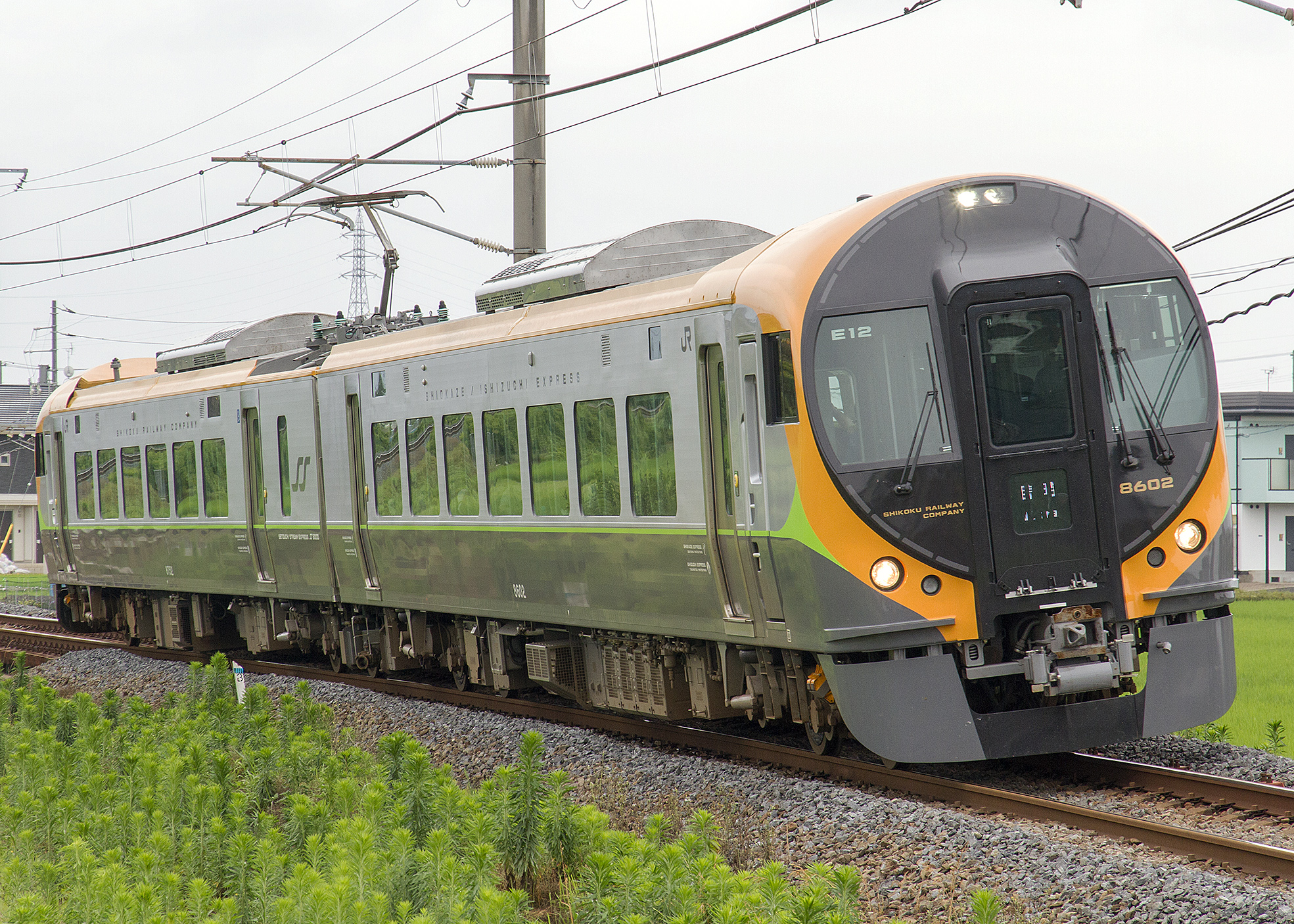
Two-car set E12 in June 2014

The two-car sets, numbered E11 to E14, are formed with one motored "M" car and one trailer "T" car, as shown below.

Designation	Mc	Tc
Numbering	8600	8750
Weight (t)	41.9 (Note: 41.6 t for pre-series sets E11 and E12)	38.6 (Note: 38.3 t for pre-series sets E11 and E12)
Capacity	56	45
Facilities	Vending machine, toilets	Wheelchair space, toilets

==== Notes ====
The "Tc" car is fitted with a single-arm pantograph.

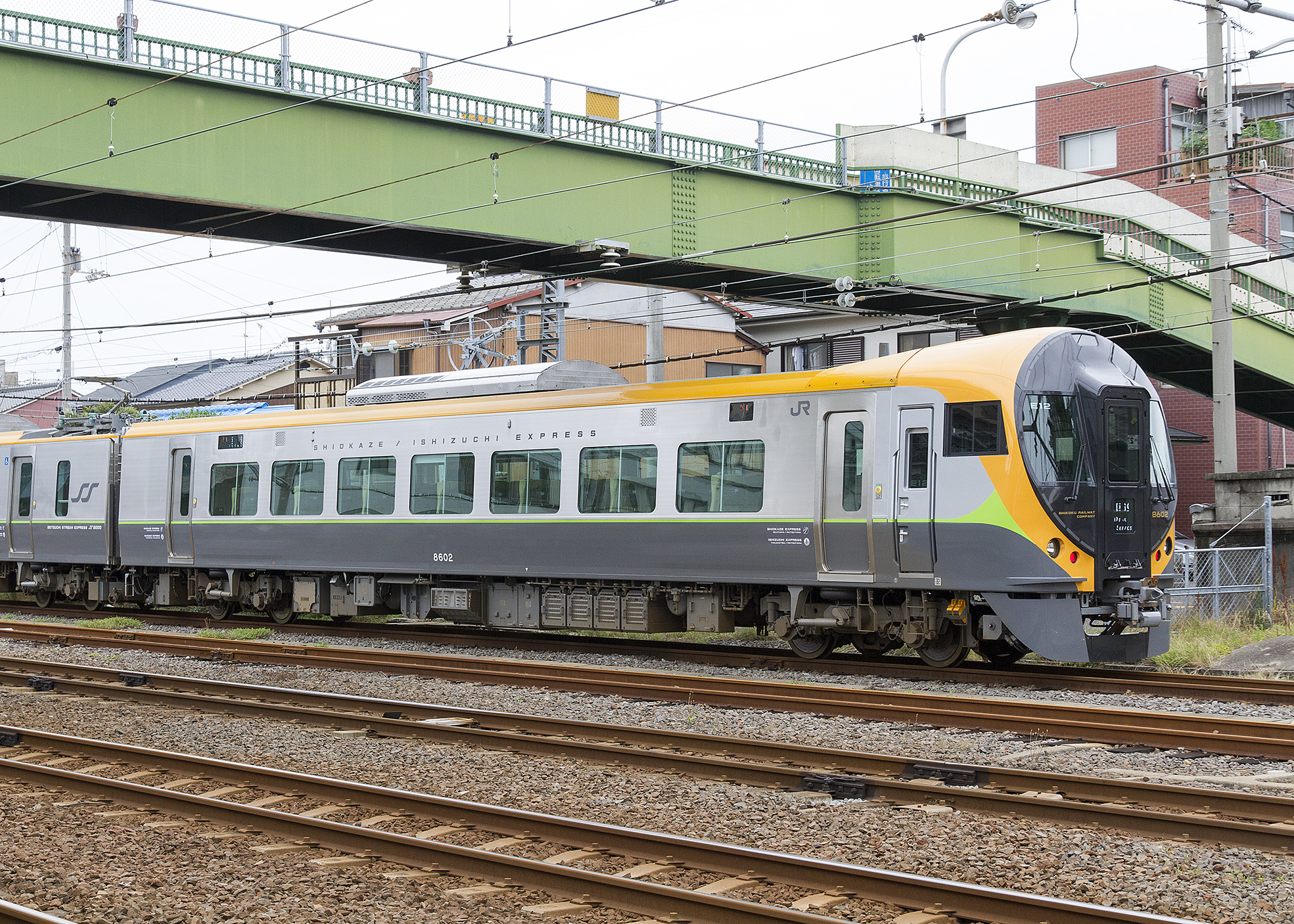
Car 8602 of set E12

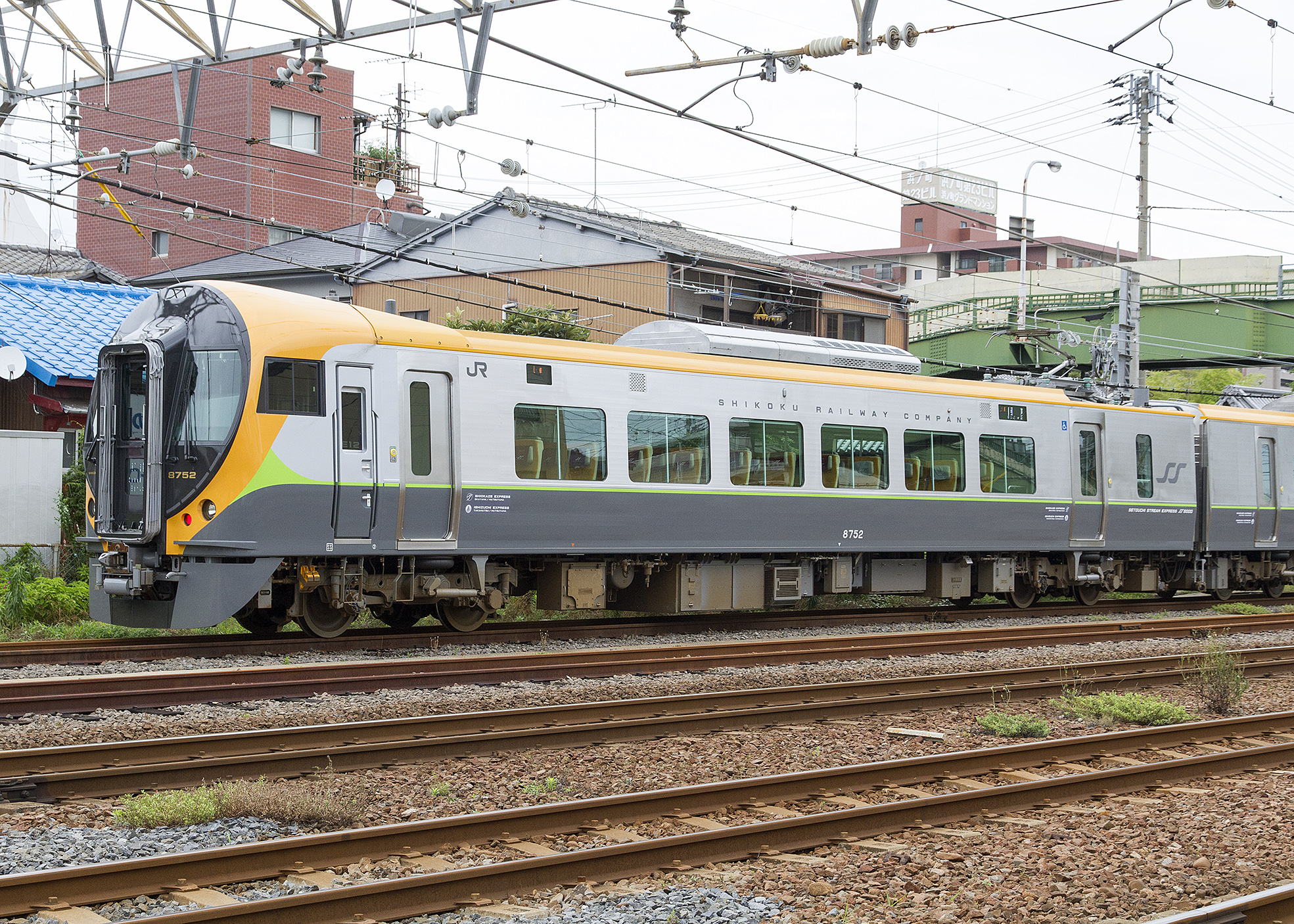
Car 8752 of set E12

== Interior ==
Passenger accommodation consists of ordinary-class 2+2 abreast reclining seats with a seat pitch of 980 mm (39 in) and "Green car" (first class) 2+1 abreast reclining seats with a seat pitch of 1,170 mm (46 in). Each seat is provided with an AC power outlet. The "Mc" car has a "Fresh Green" theme with light-green and dark-green seat covers; the "Tc" car has a "Shine Orange" theme, with orange and brown seat covers. The "Tc" car has a wider (900 mm (35 in)) door for wheelchair accessibility, and includes a wheelchair space and universal access toilet. LED lighting is used throughout.

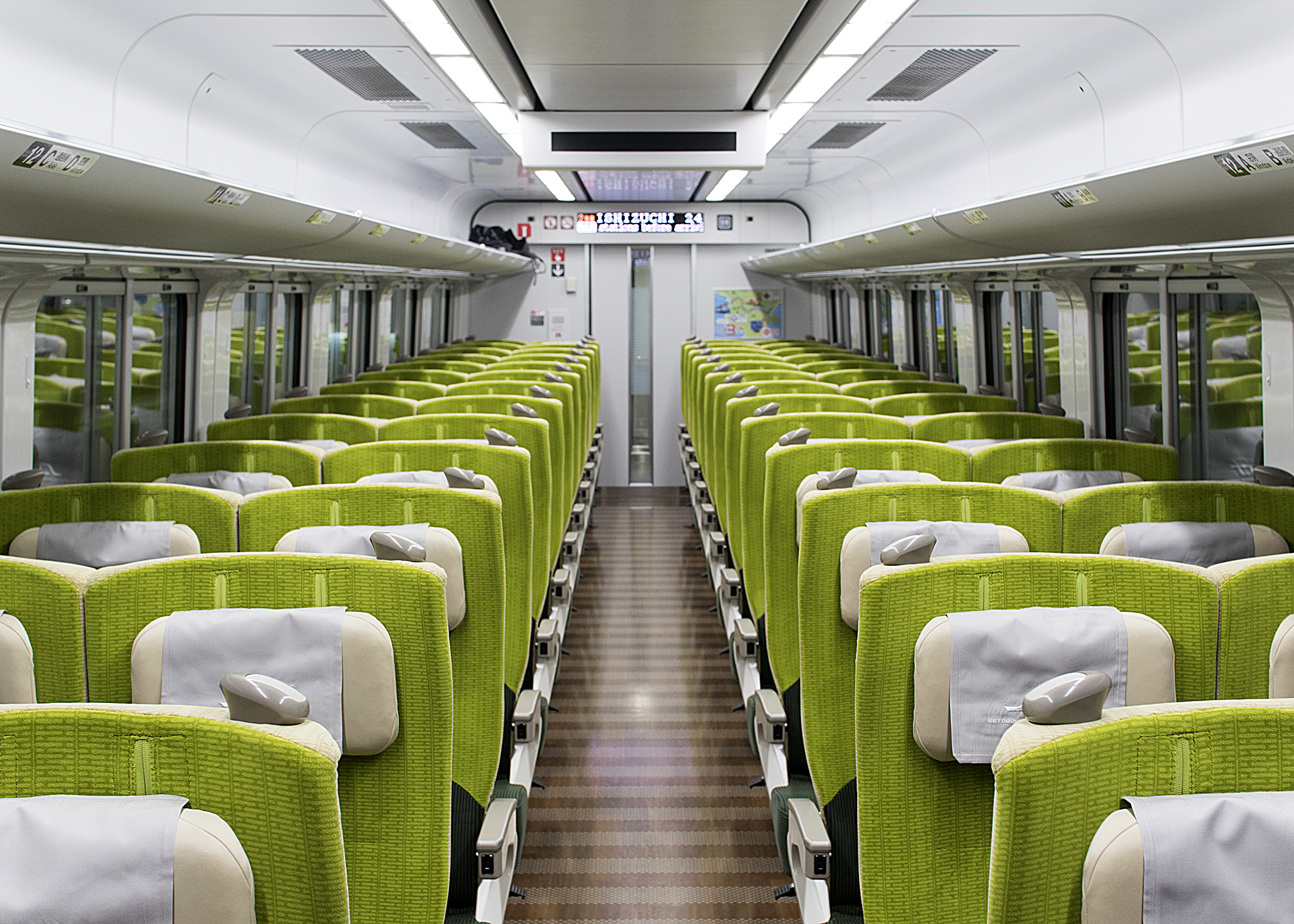
Interior of car 8601

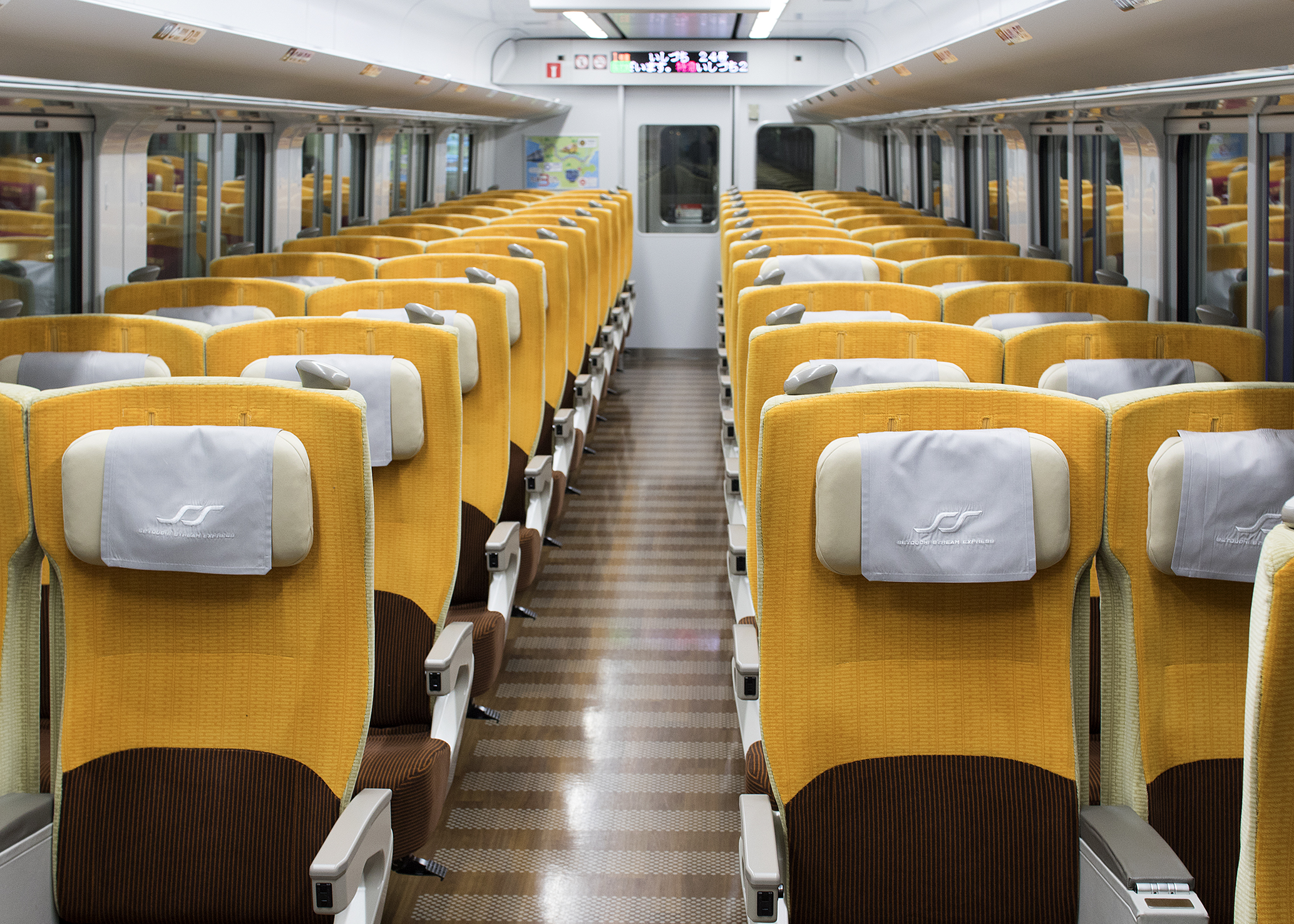
Interior of car 8751

== History ==
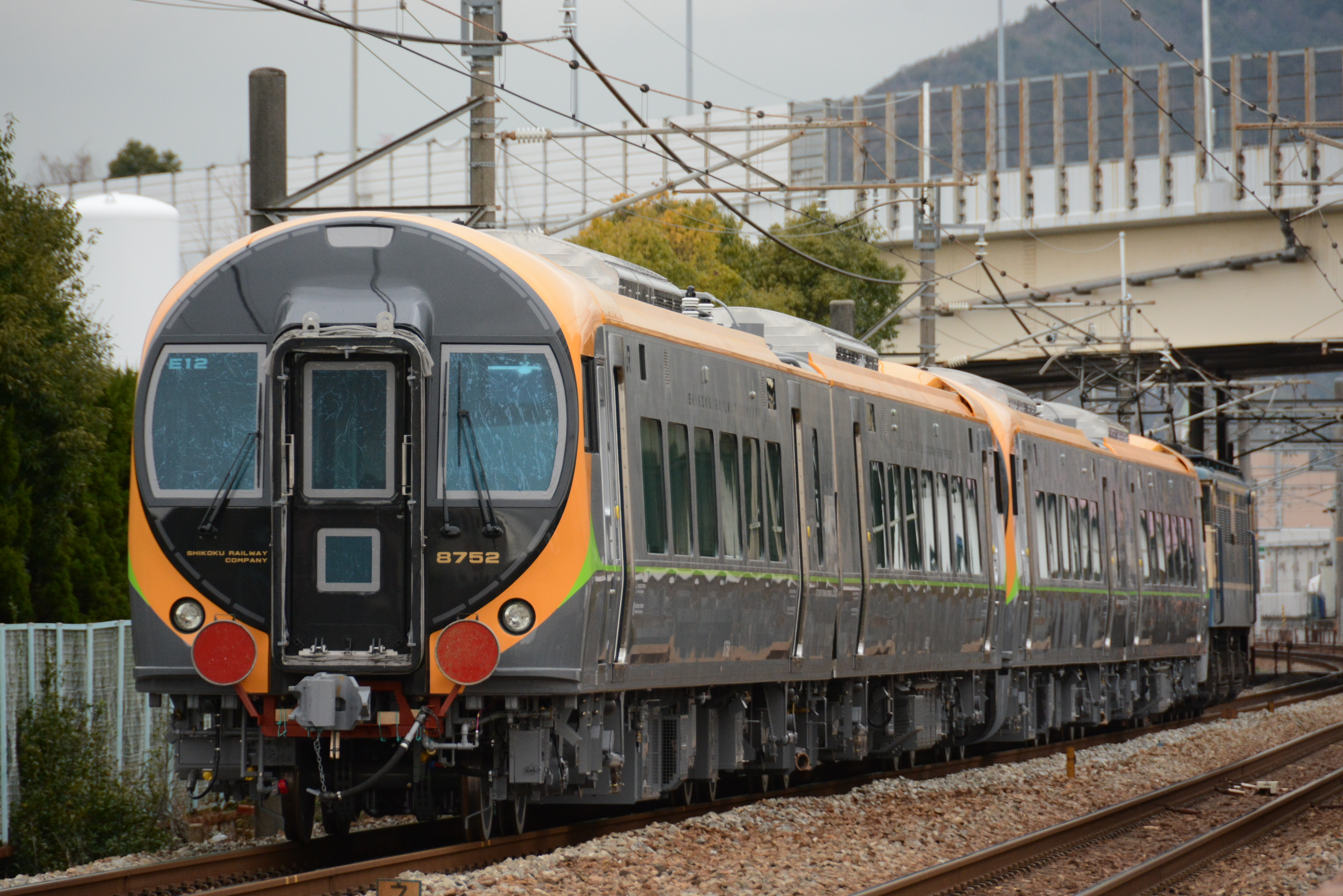
The first two sets, E11 and E12, being delivered in February 2014

The first two pre-series sets, E11 and E12, were delivered to Takamatsu Depot from the Kawasaki Heavy Industries factory in Kobe in February 2014. Test running commenced in March. The trains entered service on Ishizuchi limited express services between Takamatsu and Matsuyama on 23 June 2014.

The next four full-production sets (three-car sets E1 and E2 and two-car sets E13 and E14) were delivered from Kawasaki Heavy Industries in October 2015.

In 2017, JR West borrowed two 8600 series sets to test the feasibility of pneumatic tilting on the Hakubi Line for a new rolling stock type for its Yakumo limited express services. The pneumatic tilting system proved unsuitable for the line, and JR West decided that the new rolling stock would use a pendular tilting system instead.

Three-car set E3 was delivered from Kawasaki Heavy Industries in January 2018, entering service on 14 February.
