= JR Shikoku 2000 series =

Diesel multiple unit train type operated in Japan

2000 series
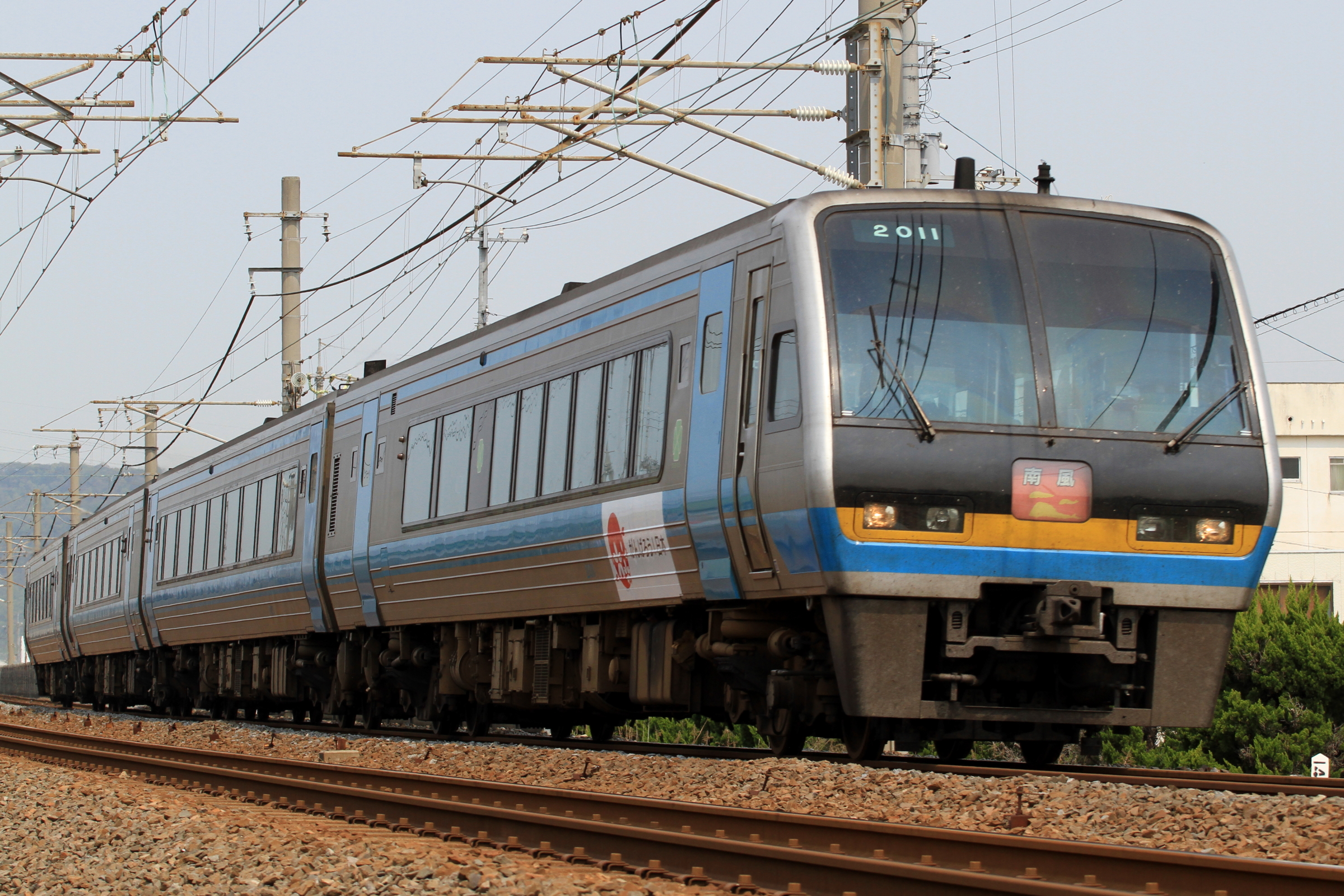
- A 2000 series set on a Nanpū service in April 2011
- In service: 1989–Present
- Manufacturer: Fuji Heavy Industries
- Constructed: TSE 2000 series; 1989; 2000 series; 1990-1992; N2000 series; 1995-1998
- Number built: 80 vehicles
- Number in service: 71 vehicles
- Number scrapped: TSE 2000 series; 3 vehicles 2000 series; 2 vehicles (accident damage); 4 vehicles
- Operators: JR Shikoku; Tosa Kuroshio Railway

Specifications
- Car body construction: Stainless steel
- Car length: 20,800 mm (68 ft 3 in)
- Width: 2,839 mm (9 ft 3.8 in)
- Height: 3,385 mm (11 ft 1.3 in)
- Maximum speed: 120 km/h (75 mph); 130 km/h (81 mph) (N2000 series)
- Prime mover: SA6D125-H
- Power output: 245 kW (329 hp) per motor 260 kW (349 hp) per motor (N2000 series)
- Bogies: S-DT56
- Track gauge: 1,067 mm (3 ft 6 in)

The 2000 series (2000系, 2000-kei) is a tilting diesel multiple unit (DMU) train type operated by Shikoku Railway Company (JR Shikoku) on limited express services in Shikoku, Japan. An identical lone 4-car set is also operated by the Tosa Kuroshio Railway.

== Variants ==
- TSE 2000 series (1989–2018)
- 2000 series (since 1990)
- N2000 series (since 1995)
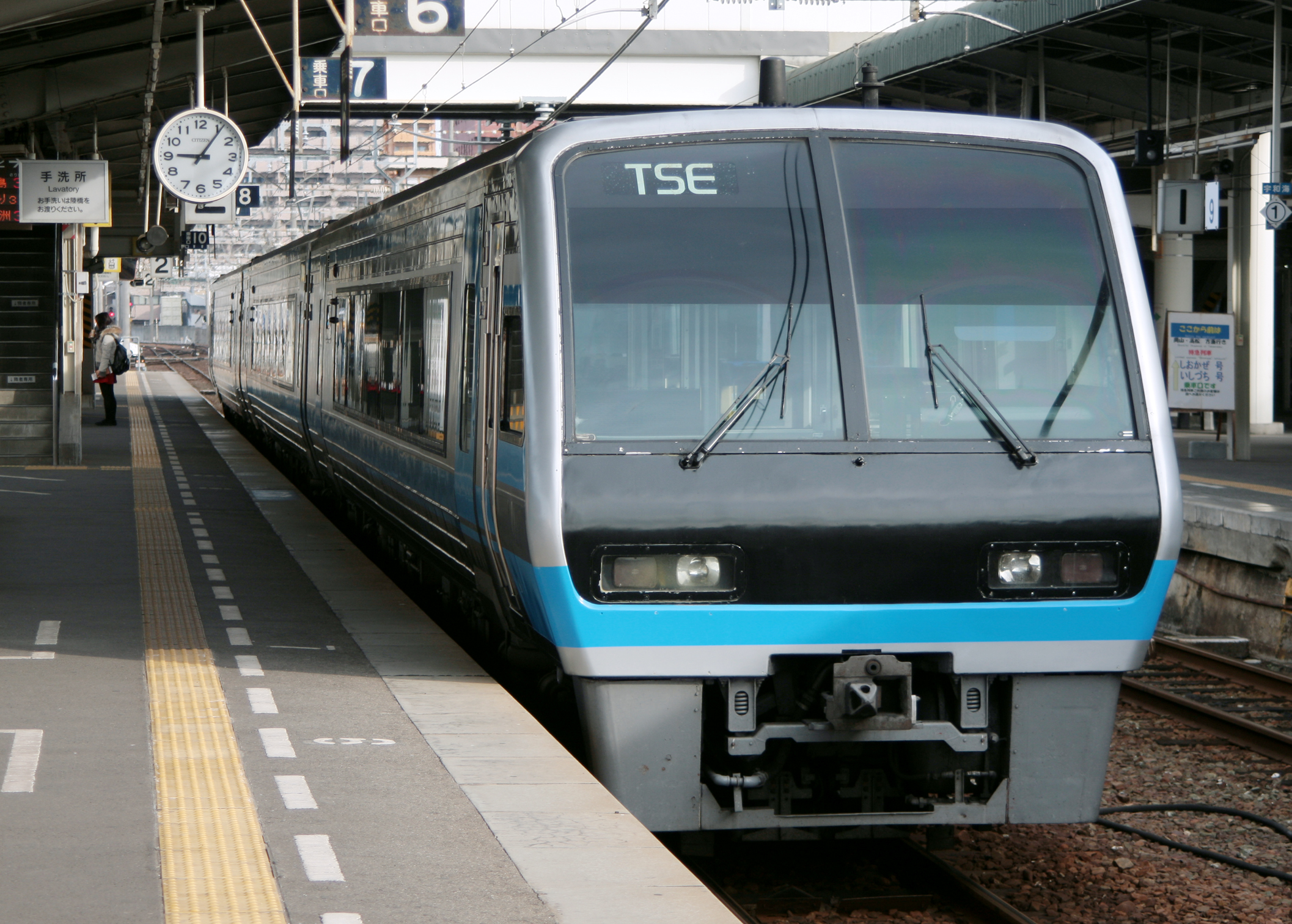
TSE (2000 series prototype set)

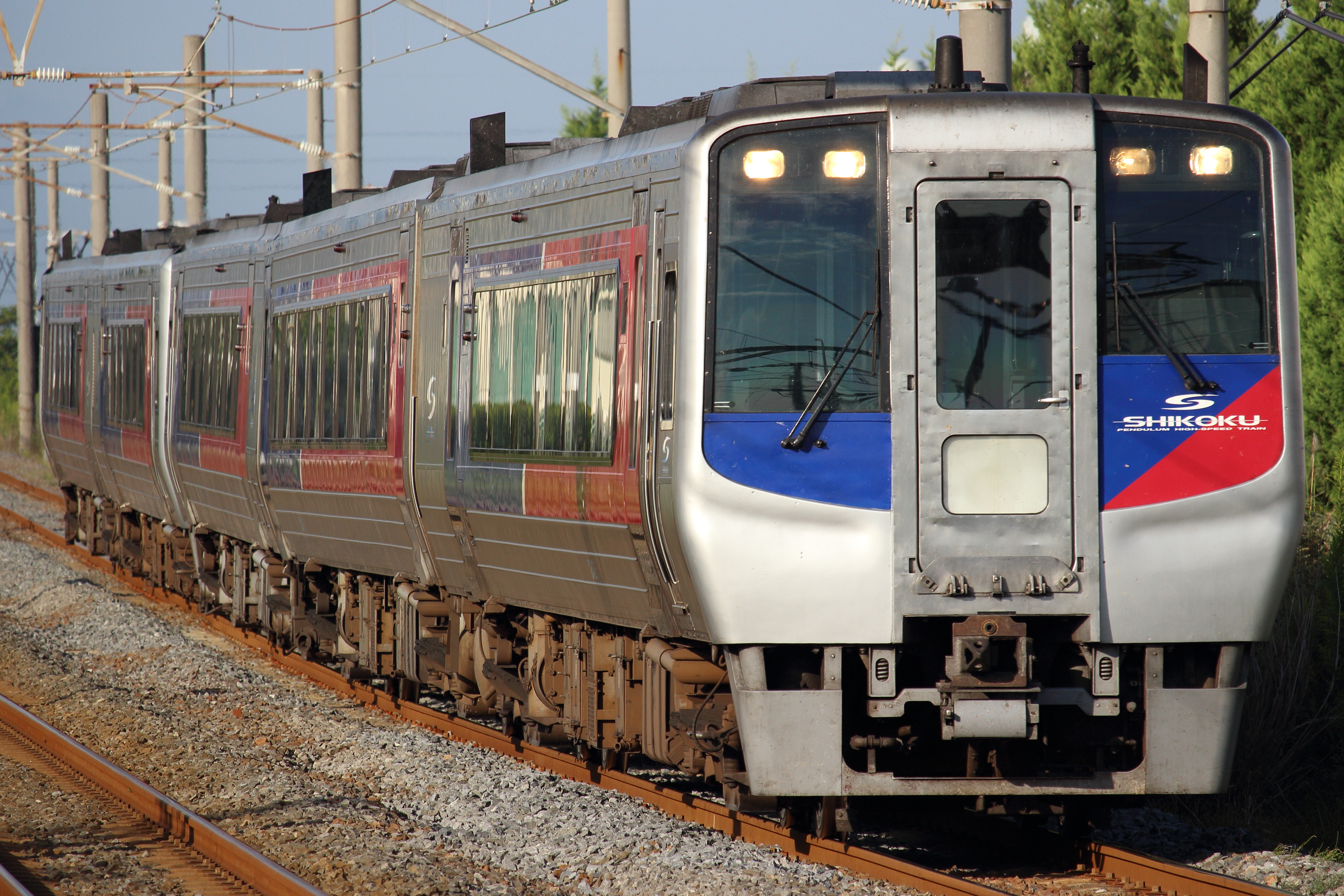
N2000 series

== Technical specifications ==
The trains use stainless steel car bodies, and are powered by SA6D125-H engines. The tilting system uses active pendular suspensions.

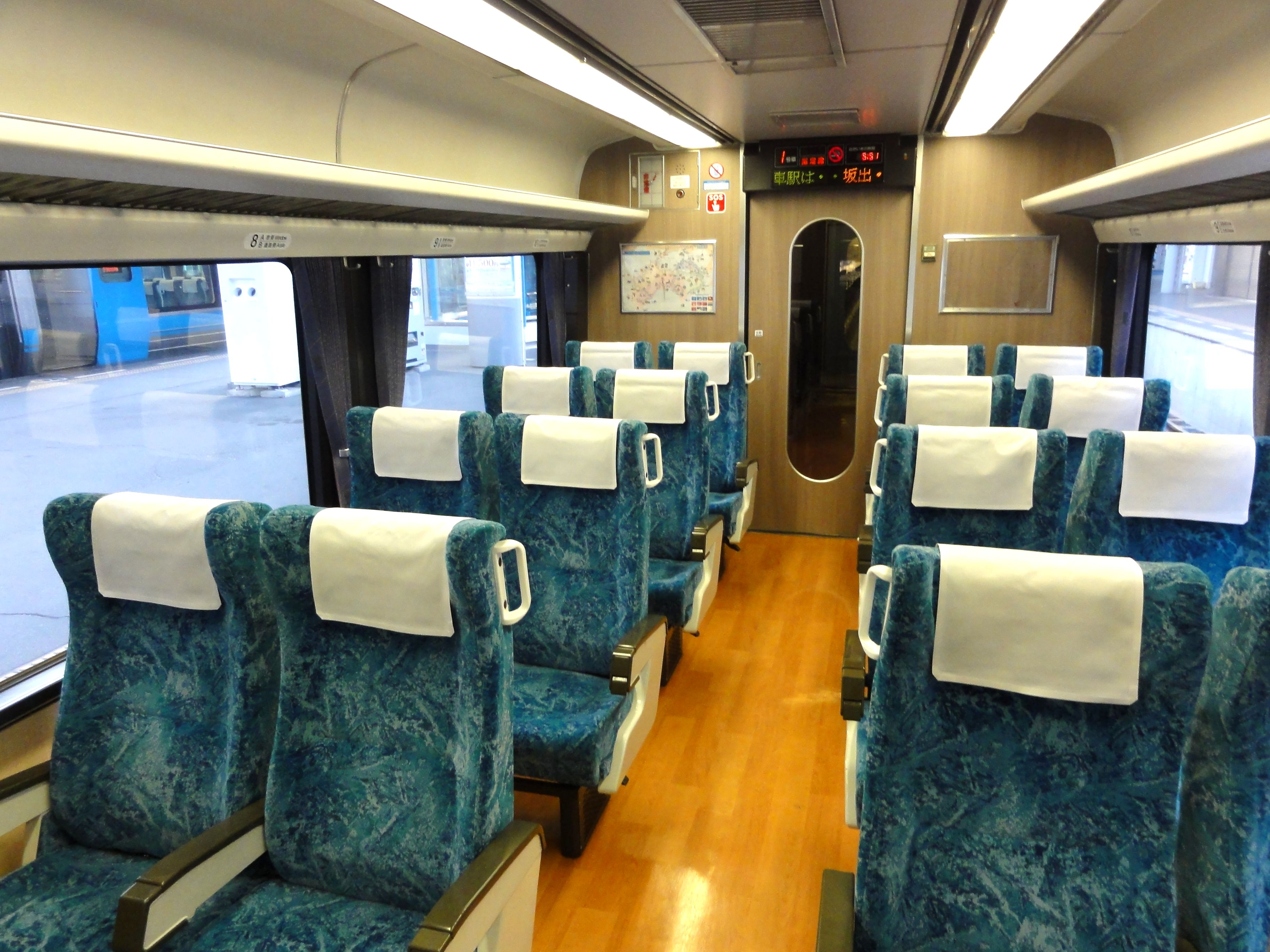
Interior view

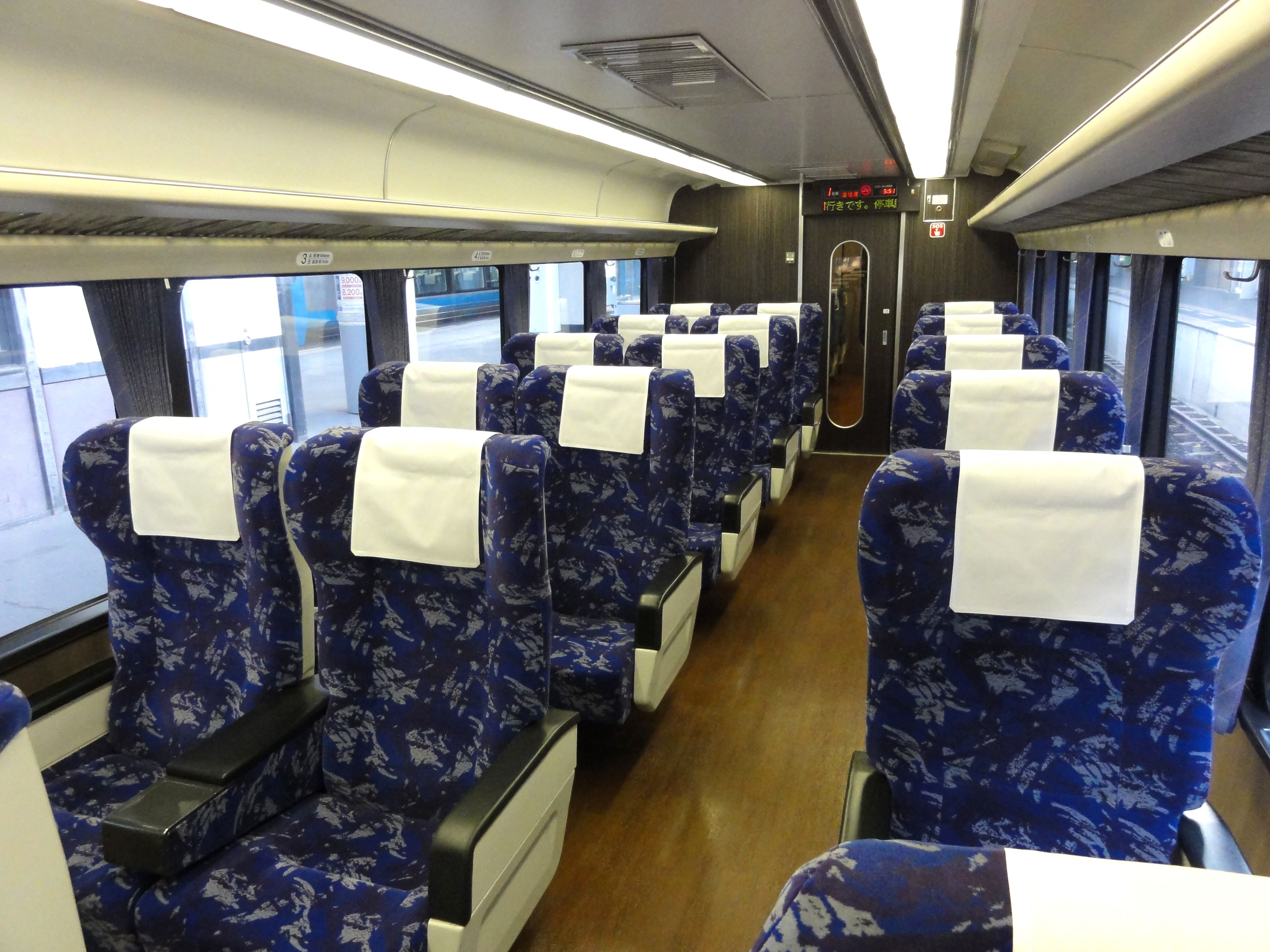
Green Car interior

== History ==
The prototype TSE ("Trans-Shikoku Experimental") set was introduced in 1989, and was the recipient of the 1990 Laurel Prize. Full-production sets followed in 1990. An improved version, designated as N2000, was introduced in 1995. These sets feature a higher power output.

The TSE prototype set was withdrawn from revenue service in March 2018. 2000 series trains are gradually being replaced by new 2700 series trains since 2020.

== Operations ==
2000/N2000 series trains are currently used on the following services:

- Ashizuri (Kōchi - Sukumo)
- Uwakai (Matsuyama - Uwajima)
