= Awai =

Awai may refer to:

== People ==
- Cheyenne Awai, cyclist
- Nicole Awai (born 1966), American artist and educator

== Places ==
- Awai Station, Japan

== See also ==
- Aiwa, often misspelled electronics brand
