= Imabari Station =

Railway station in Imabari, Ehime Prefecture, Japan

Y40 Imabari Station 今治駅
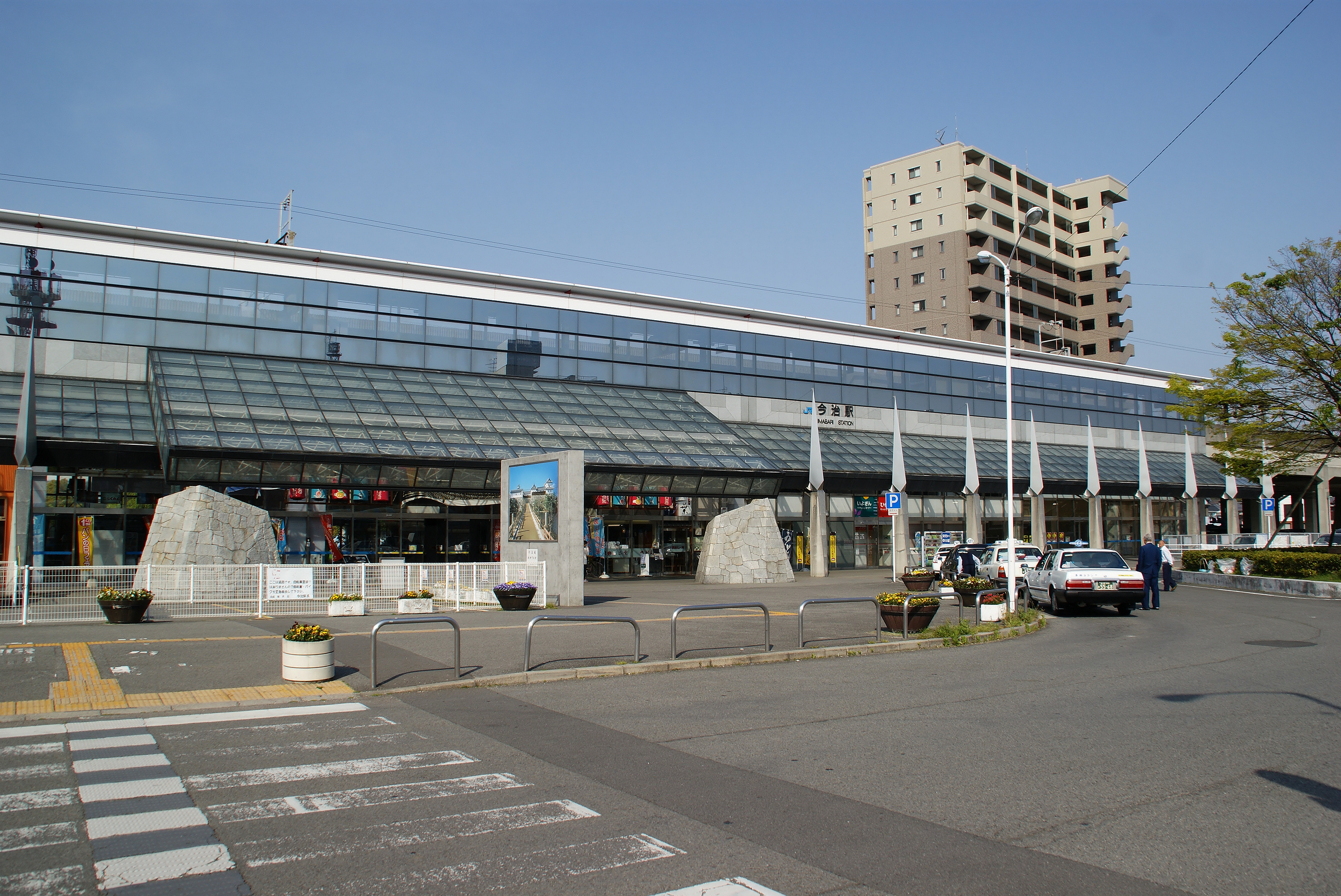
- Imabari Station in 2010

General information
- Location: 1 Chome Kitahōraichō, Imabari-shi, Ehime-ken 794-0028; Japan
- Coordinates: 34°3′51″N 132°59′37.1″E
- Operator: JR Shikoku
- Line: ■ Yosan Line
- Distance: 144.9 km from Takamatsu
- Platforms: 1 side + 1 island platforms
- Tracks: 3
- Connections: Bus terminal

Construction
- Structure type: Elevated
- Parking: Available
- Cycle facilities: Parking and rental available
- Accessible: Yes - platforms served by elevators

Other information
- Status: Staffed (Midori no Madoguchi)
- Station code: Y40
- Website: Official website

History
- Opened: 11 February 1924; 102 years ago

Passengers
- FY2023: 2089
Location
- Location within Ehime Prefecture Location within Japan

Imabari Station (今治駅, Imabari-eki) is a passenger railway station located in the city of Imabari, Ehime Prefecture, Japan. It is operated by JR Shikoku and has the station number "Y36".

== Lines ==
Imabari Station is served by the JR Shikoku Yosan Line and is located 144.9 km from the beginning of the line at Takamatsu. Yosan Line local trains which stop at the station only serve the sector between Iyo-Saijō and Matsuyama. Connections with other local or limited express trains are needed to travel further east or west along the line.

In addition, the following JR Shikoku limited express services also serve the station:

- Shiokaze - from Okayama to Matsuyama and Uwajima
- Ishizuchi - from Matsuyama to Takamatsu and Uwajima
- Midnight Express Matsuyama - in one direction only, from Matsuyama to Niihama
- Morning Express Matsuyama - in one direction only, from Niihama to Matsuyama

== Layout ==
The station consists of an island platform and a side platform serving three elevated tracks. The station building houses a waiting room, shops, a bakery, a JR Midori no Madoguchi staffed ticket office and a JR Travel Centre (Warp Plaza). The platforms are located on the third level. Passengers may cross from the side to the island platform and vice versa through a passage on the second level served by elevators and escalators. Bicycle rental is available at the station. Car parking and car rental is available just outside the station building.

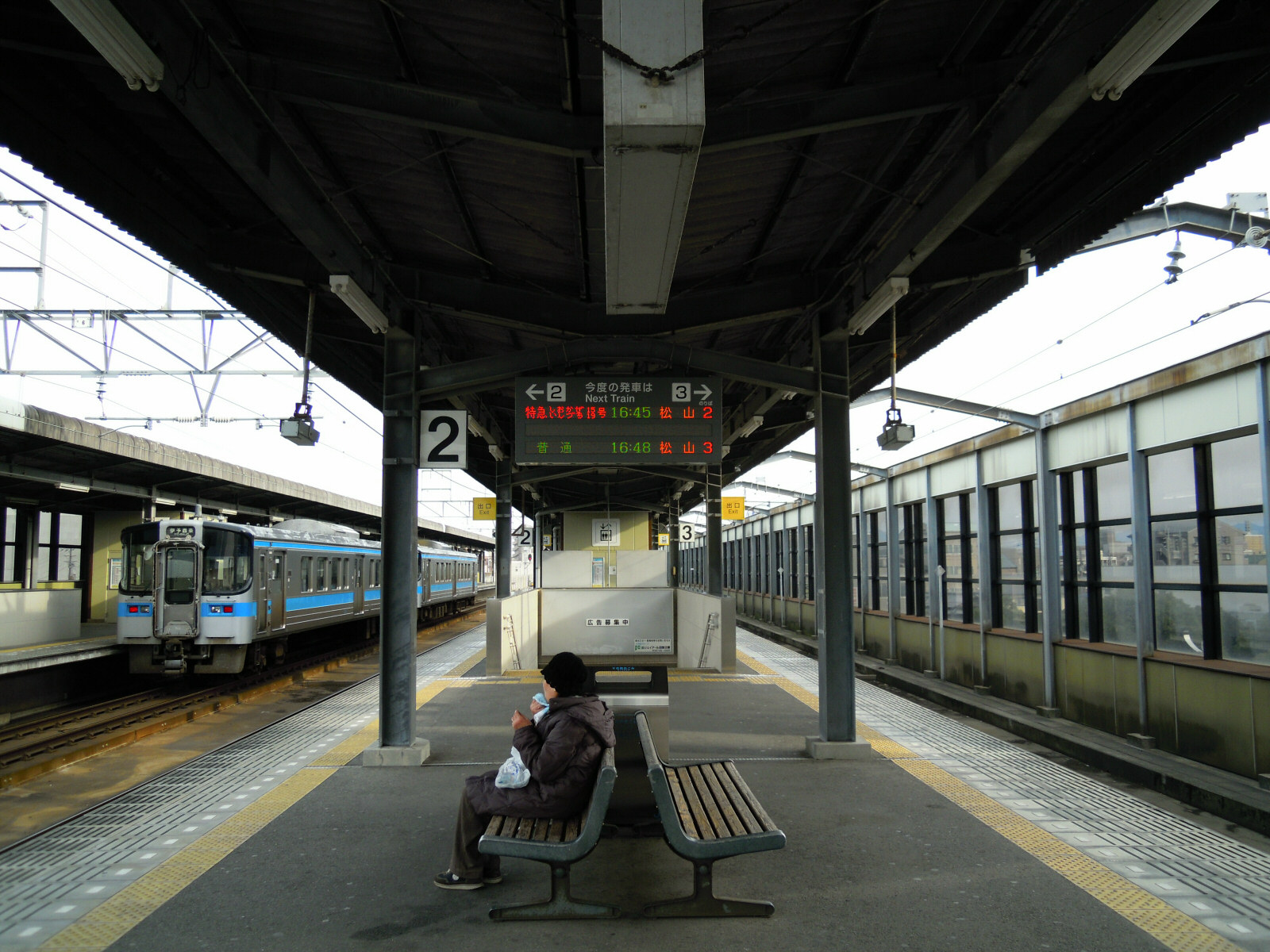
View of the platforms. The yellow column in the distance is the elevator shaft.

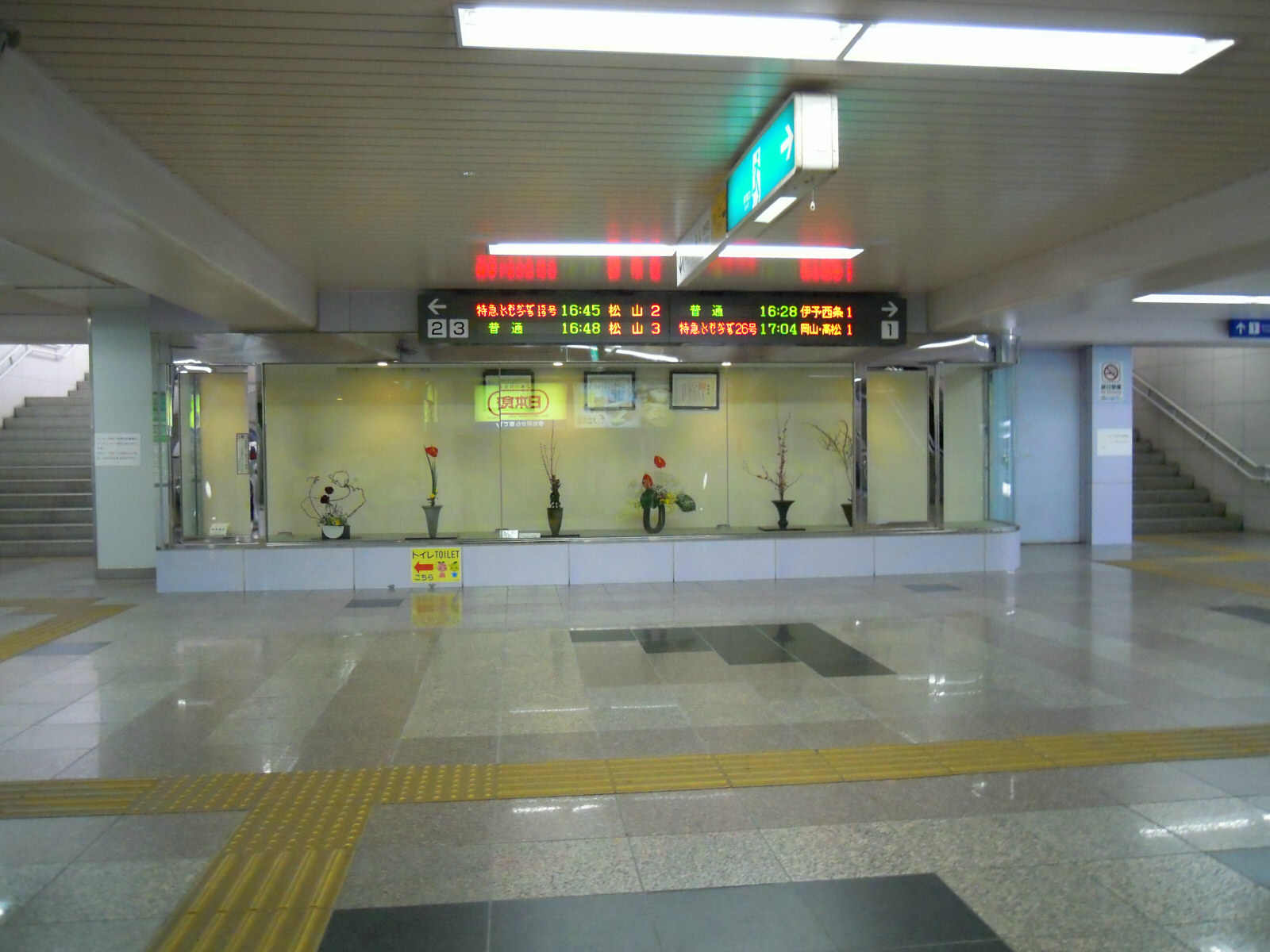
Passageway connecting the platforms.

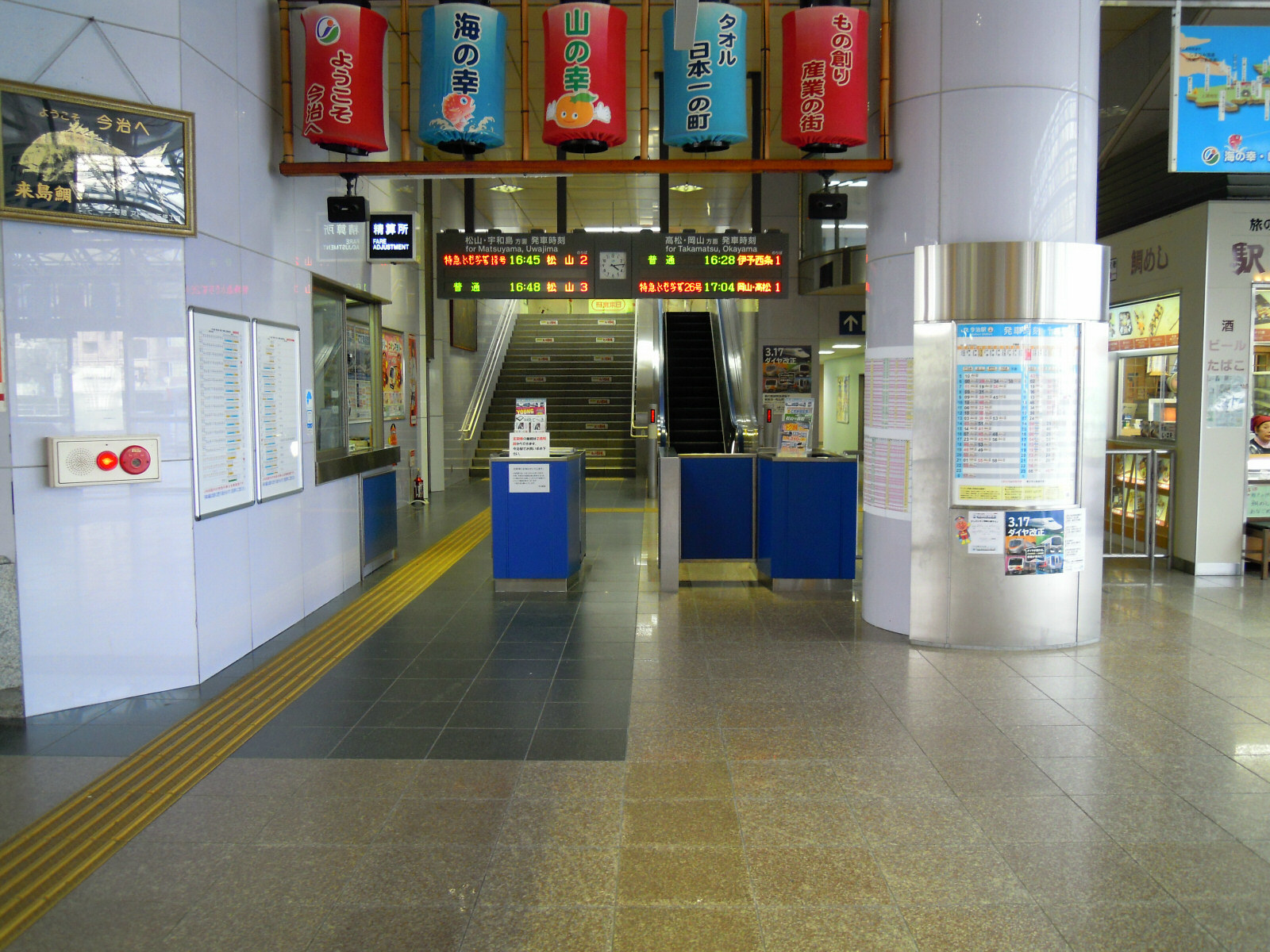
Ticket gate.

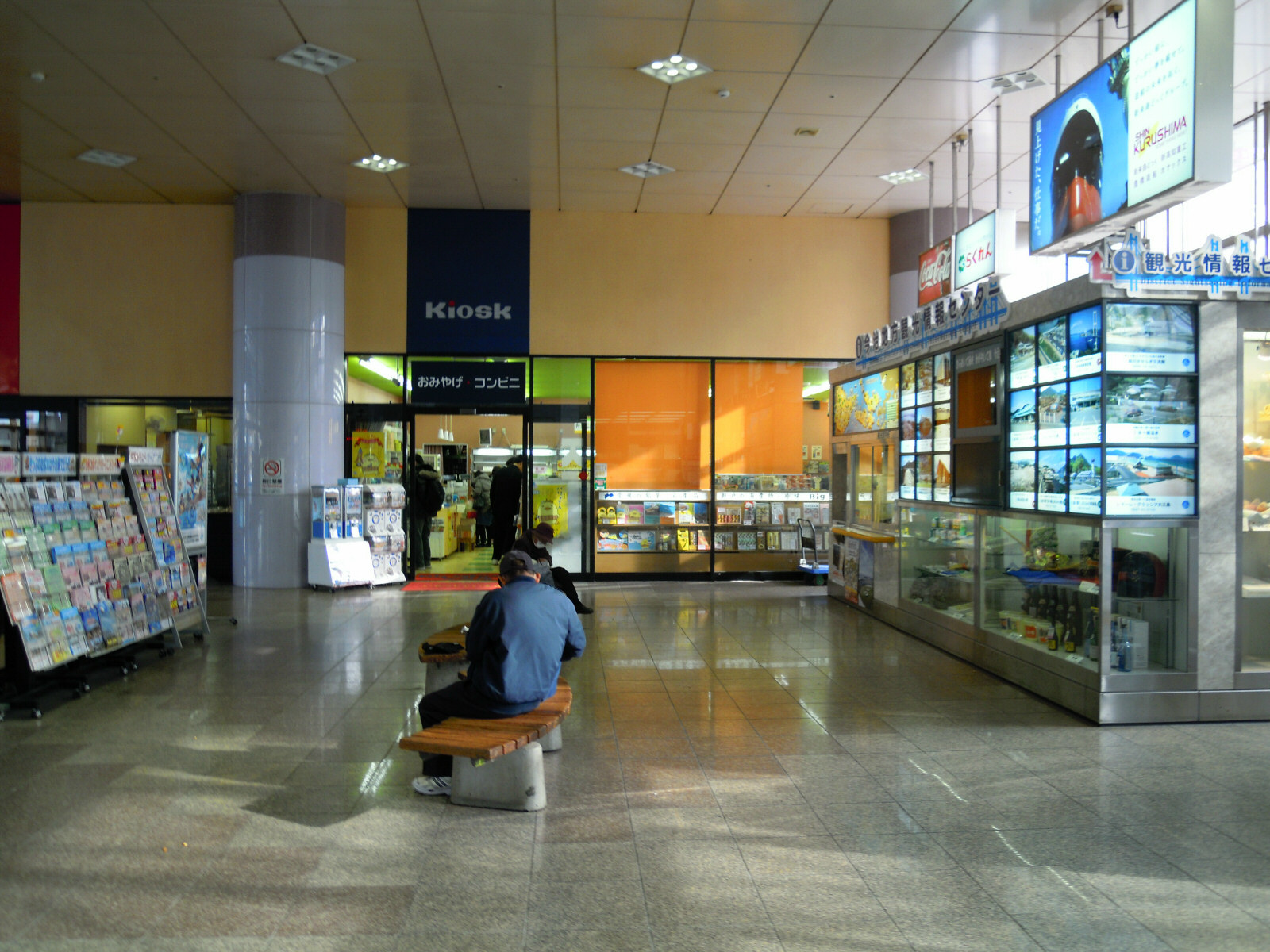
Part of the station concourse.

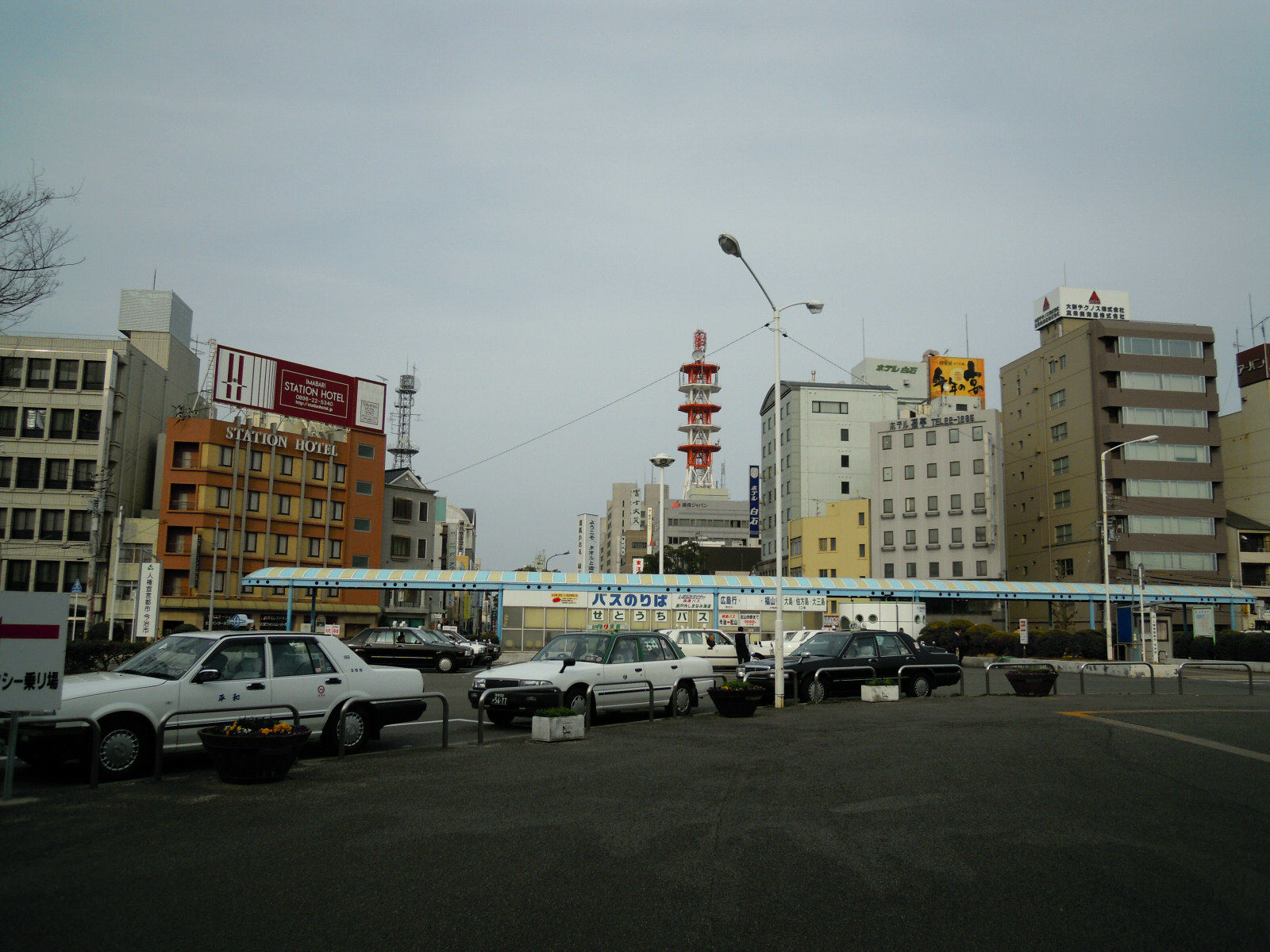
Taxis outside the station. The bus terminal is just beyond.

== Adjacent stations ==
«	Service	»
JR Limited Express Services
Nyūgawa	Shiokaze	Iyo-Hōjō
Nyūgawa	Ishizuchi	Iyo-Hōjō
Iyo-Hōjō	Midnight Express Matsuyama	Nyūgawa
Nyūgawa	Morning Express Matsuyama	Iyo-Hōjō
Yosan Line
Iyo-Tomita	Local	Hashihama

== History ==
Imabari Station opened on 11 February 1924 as the terminus of the then Sanyo Line which had been extended westwards from Iyo-Sakurai. It became a through-station on 1 December 1924 when the line was further extended to Ōnishi. At that time the station was operated by Japanese Government Railways, later becoming Japanese National Railways (JNR). With the privatization of JNR on 1 April 1987, control of the station passed to JR Shikoku.

== Surrounding area ==
- Imabari City Hall
- Imabari Meitoku High School
- Ehime Prefectural Imabari Kita High School
- Ehime Prefectural Imabari Nishi High School

== See also ==
- List of railway stations in Japan
