= Hashihama Station =

Railway station in Imabari, Ehime Prefecture, Japan

Y41 Hashihama Station 波止浜駅
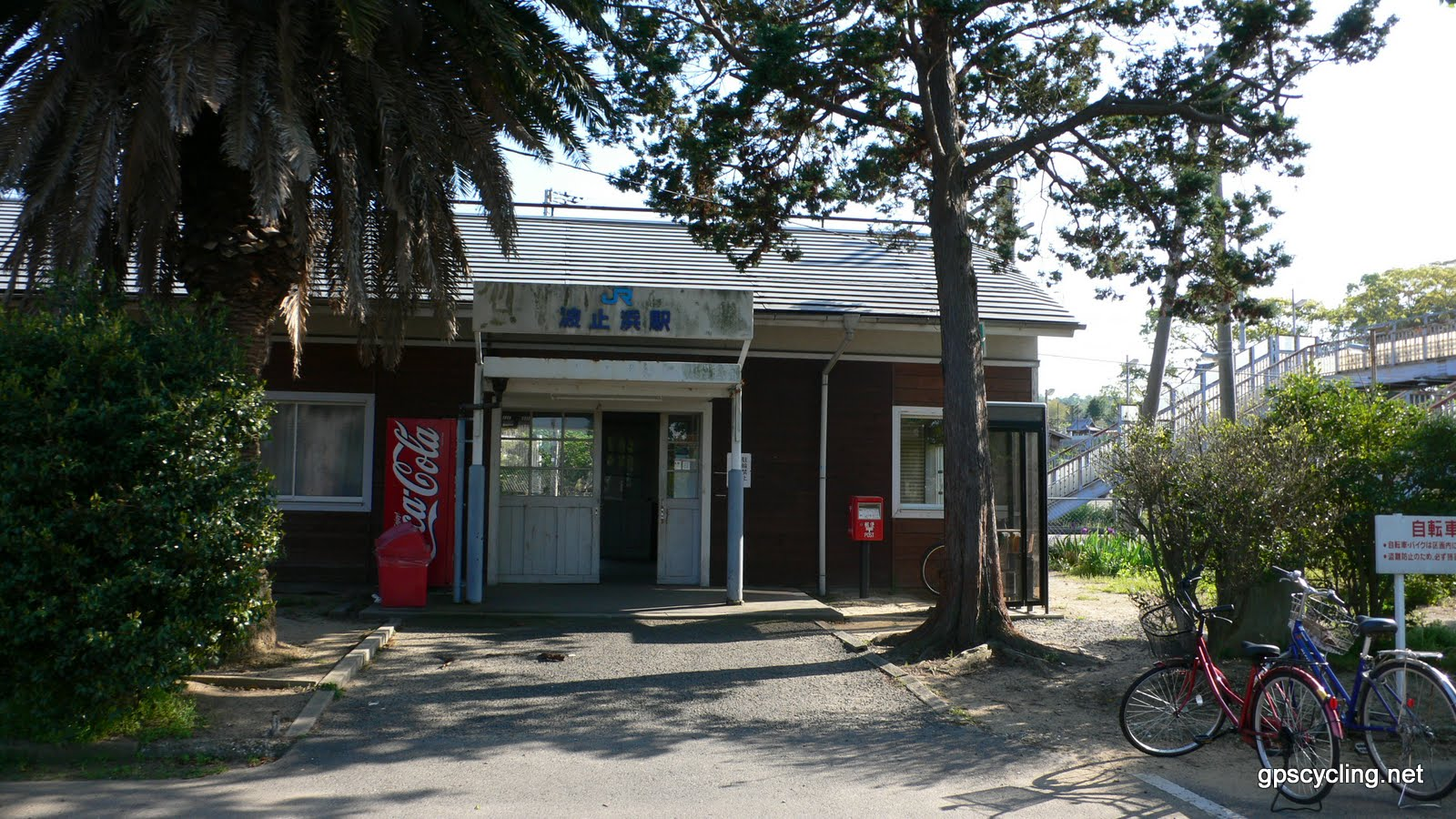
- Hashihama Station in May 2006

General information
- Location: Japan
- Coordinates: 34.0980°N 132.9688°E
- Operator: JR Shikoku
- Line: ■ Yosan Line
- Distance: 149.6 km from Takamatsu
- Platforms: 2 side platforms
- Tracks: 2 + 1 siding

Construction
- Structure type: At grade
- Parking: Available
- Cycle facilities: Designated parking area for bicycles
- Accessible: No - platforms linked by footbridge

Other information
- Status: Unstaffed
- Station code: Y41

History
- Opened: 1 December 1924; 101 years ago

Passengers
- FY2019: 564
Location
- Location within Ehime Prefecture Location within Japan

Hashihama Station (波止浜駅, Hashihama-eki) is a passenger railway station located in the city of Imabari, Ehime Prefecture, Japan. It is operated by JR Shikoku and has the station number "Y41".

== Lines ==
Hashihama Station is served by the JR Shikoku Yosan Line and is located 149.6 km from the beginning of the line at Takamatsu Station. Only Yosan Line local trains stop at the station and they only serve the sector between Iyo-Saijō and Matsuyama. Connections with other local or limited express trains are needed to travel further east or west along the line.

== Layout ==
The station consists of two opposed side platforms serving two tracks. Line 1 is a straight track while line 2 is a passing siding. The station building, linked to platform/track 1, is unstaffed and serves only as a waiting room. Access to platform 2, which also has a weather shelter, is by means of a footbridge. Parking is available at the station forecourt. There is also a designated parking area for bicycles but no shed. A siding branches off line 2.

== Adjacent stations ==
«	Service	»
Yosan Line
Imabari	Local	Namikata

== History ==
Hashihama Station opened on 1 December 1924 as an intermediate stop when the then Sanyo Line was extended westwards from Imabari to Ōnishi. At that time the station was operated by Japanese Government Railways, later becoming Japanese National Railways (JNR). With the privatization of JNR on 1 April 1987, control of the station passed to JR Shikoku.

== Surrounding area ==
- Hashihama Kosan Driving School
- Japan National Route 317

== See also ==
- List of railway stations in Japan
