= Horie Station =

Railway station in Matsuyama, Ehime Prefecture, Japan

Y52 Horie Station 堀江駅
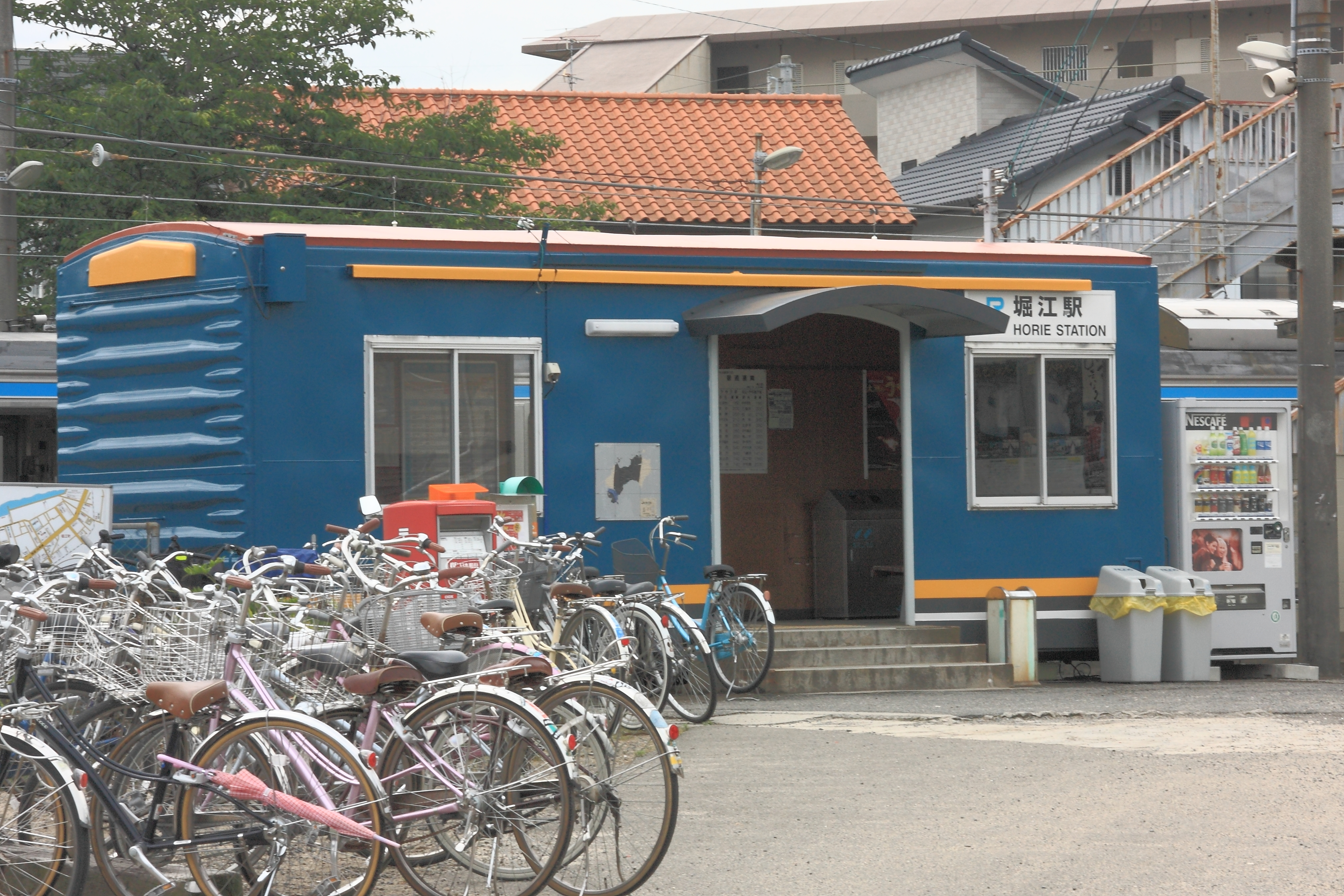
- Horie Station in 2009

General information
- Location: Horiecho, Matsuyama-shi, Ehime-ken 799-2651; Japan
- Coordinates: 33°54′18″N 132°45′12″E
- Operator: JR Shikoku
- Line: ■ Yosan Line
- Distance: 184.9 km from Takamatsu
- Platforms: 2 side platforms
- Tracks: 2 + 1 siding

Construction
- Structure type: At grade
- Accessible: No - platforms linked by footbridge

Other information
- Status: Unstaffed
- Station code: Y52

History
- Opened: 3 April 1927

Passengers
- FY2019: 444
Location
- Location within Ehime Prefecture Location within Japan

Horie Station (堀江駅, Horie-eki) is a passenger railway station located in the city of Matsuyama, Ehime Prefecture, Japan. It is operated by JR Shikoku and has the station number "Y52".

== Lines ==
Horie Station is served by the JR Shikoku Yosan Line and is located 184.9 km from the beginning of the line at Takamatsu. Only Yosan Line local trains stop at the station and they only serve the sector between Iyo-Saijō and Matsuyama. Connections with other local or limited express trains are needed to travel further east or west along the line.

== Layout ==
The station, which is unstaffed, consists of two opposed side platforms serving two tracks. A disused freight car has been set up next to the tracks and converted into a waiting room in the same style as at Minoura. Access to the opposite platform is by means of a footbridge. A siding branches off line 1 and leads to the traces of a disused freight platform.

== Adjacent stations ==
«	Service	»
Yosan Line
Kōyōdai	Local	Iyo-Wake

== History ==
Horie Station opened on 3 April 1927 as an intermediate stop when the then Sanyo Line was extended from Iyo-Hōjō to Matsuyama. At that time the station was operated by Japanese Government Railways, later becoming Japanese National Railways (JNR). With the privatization of JNR on 1 April 1987, control of the station passed to JR Shikoku.

== Surrounding area ==
- Horie Sea Station Umiterasu (former Horie Port)
- Horie Beach
- Matsuyama Municipal Horie Elementary School

== See also ==
- List of railway stations in Japan
