= Iyo-Wake Station =

Railway station in Matsuyama, Ehime Prefecture, Japan

Y53 Iyo-Wake Station 伊予和気駅
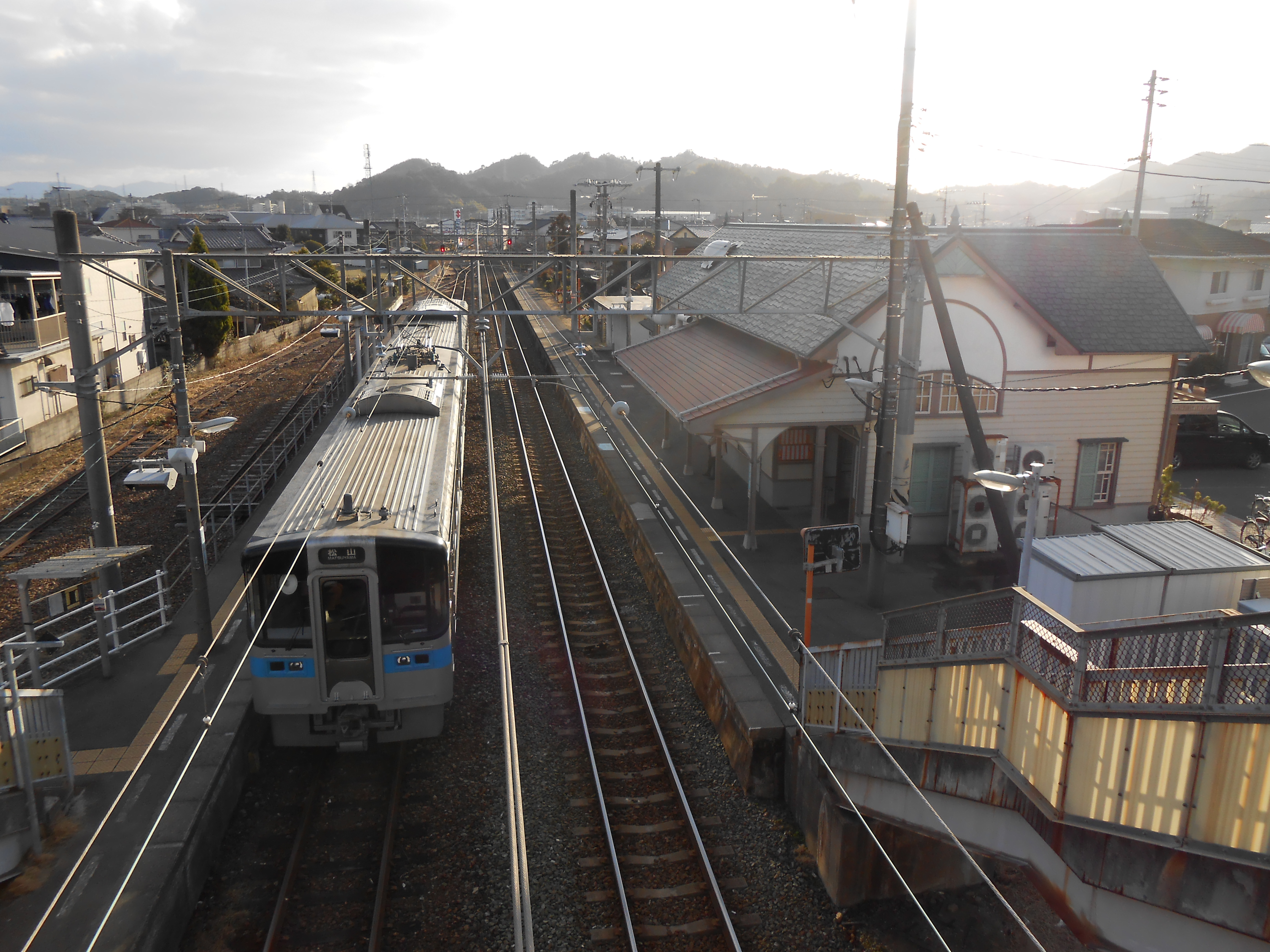
- Iyo-Wake Station in 2014. The train has stopped at platform 2, Note the sidings to the left.

General information
- Location: Japan
- Coordinates: 33°53′21″N 132°44′27″E
- Operator: JR Shikoku
- Line: ■ Yosan Line
- Distance: 187.0 km from Takamatsu
- Platforms: 2 side platforms
- Tracks: 2 + several sidings

Construction
- Structure type: At grade
- Accessible: No - platforms linked by footbridge

Other information
- Status: Unstaffed
- Station code: Y53

History
- Opened: 3 April 1927; 99 years ago

Passengers
- FY2019: 796
Location
- Location within Ehime Prefecture Location within Japan

Iyo-Wake Station (伊予和気駅, Iyo-Wake-eki) is a passenger railway station located in the city of Matsuyama, Ehime Prefecture, Japan. It is operated by JR Shikoku and has the station number "Y53".

== Lines ==
The station is served by the JR Shikoku Yosan Line and is located 187.0 km from the beginning of the line at Takamatsu. Only Yosan Line local trains stop at the station and they only serve the sector between Iyo-Saijō and Matsuyama. Connections with other local or limited express trains are needed to travel further east or west along the line.

== Layout ==
Iyo-Wake Station consists of two opposed side platforms serving two tracks. Line 1, served by platform 1, is the straight track and line 2, served by platform 2, is a passing loop. A station building linked to platform 1 houses a waiting room and an automatic ticket vending machine. Access to platform 2 is by means of a footbridge. Several sidings branch off line 2 while on the side of platform 1 are the traces of a disused freight platform.

== Adjacent stations ==
«	Service	»
Yosan Line
Horie	Local	Mitsuhama

== History ==
Iyo-Wake Station opened on 3 April 1927 as an intermediate stop when the then Sanyo Line was extended from Iyo-Hōjō to Matsuyama. At that time the station was operated by Japanese Government Railways, later becoming Japanese National Railways (JNR). With the privatization of JNR on 1 April 1987, control of the station passed to JR Shikoku.

== Surrounding area ==
- Taisen-ji, 52nd temple of the Shikoku Pilgrimage
- Enmyo-ji, 53rd temple of the Shikoku Pilgrimage
- Shikoku Electric Power Matsuyama Solar Power Plant
- Ehime Prefectural Matsuyama School for the Deaf

== See also ==
- List of railway stations in Japan
