= Asanami Station =

Railway station in Matsuyama, Ehime Prefecture, Japan

Y46 Asanami Station 浅海駅
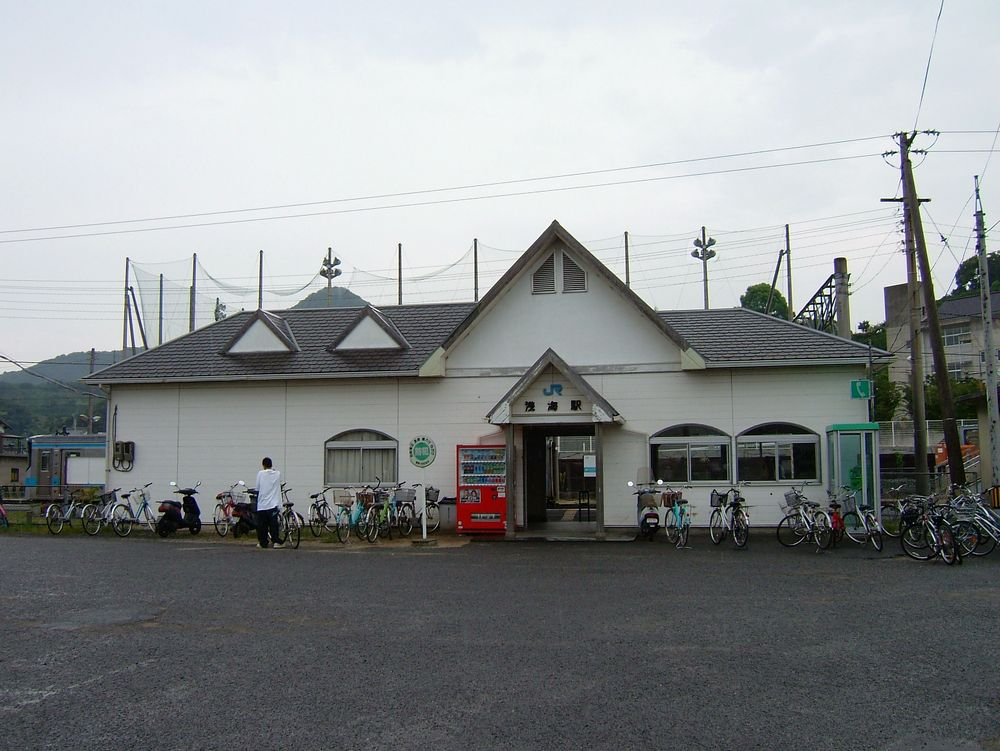
- Asanami Station on 21 August 2006

General information
- Location: Asanamihondani, Matsuyama-shi, Ehime-ken 799-2402; Japan
- Coordinates: 34°00′36″N 132°48′11″E
- Operator: JR Shikoku
- Line: ■ Yosan Line
- Distance: 170.6 km from Takamatsu
- Platforms: 1 side + 1 island platform, 1 freight platform
- Tracks: 2 + 1 passing siding for freight platform

Construction
- Structure type: At grade
- Parking: Available
- Accessible: No - platforms linked by footbridge

Other information
- Status: Unstaffed
- Station code: Y46

History
- Opened: 28 March 1926; 100 years ago

Passengers
- FY2019: 142
Location
- Location within Ehime Prefecture Location within Japan

Asanami Station (浅海駅, Asanami-eki) is a passenger railway station located in the city of Matsuyama, Ehime Prefecture, Japan. It is operated by JR Shikoku and has the station number "Y46".

== Lines ==
Asanami Station is served by the JR Shikoku Yosan Line and is located 170.6 km from the beginning of the line at Takamatsu. Only Yosan Line local trains stop at the station and they only serve the sector between Iyo-Saijō and Matsuyama. Connections with other local or limited express trains are needed to travel further east or west along the line.

== Layout ==
The station, which is unstaffed, consists of a side platform and an island platform serving two tracks. A passing siding runs on the other side of the island platform and is served by freight platform which is used for the loading of ballast. A station building serves as a waiting room and is linked to platform 1. Access to platform 2 (the island platform) is by means of a footbridge. Parking is available at the station forecourt.

== Adjacent stations ==
«	Service	»
Yosan Line
Kikuma	Local	Ōura

== History ==
Asanami Station opened on 28 March 1926 as an intermediate stop when the then Sanyo Line was extended from Kikuma to Iyo-Hōjō. At that time the station was operated by Japanese Government Railways, later becoming Japanese National Railways (JNR). With the privatization of JNR on 1 April 1987, control of the station passed to JR Shikoku.

== Surrounding area ==
- Japan National Route 198.

== See also ==
- List of railway stations in Japan
