= Iyo-Sakurai Station =

Railway station in Imabari, Ehime Prefecture, Japan

Y38 Iyo-Sakurai Station 伊予桜井駅
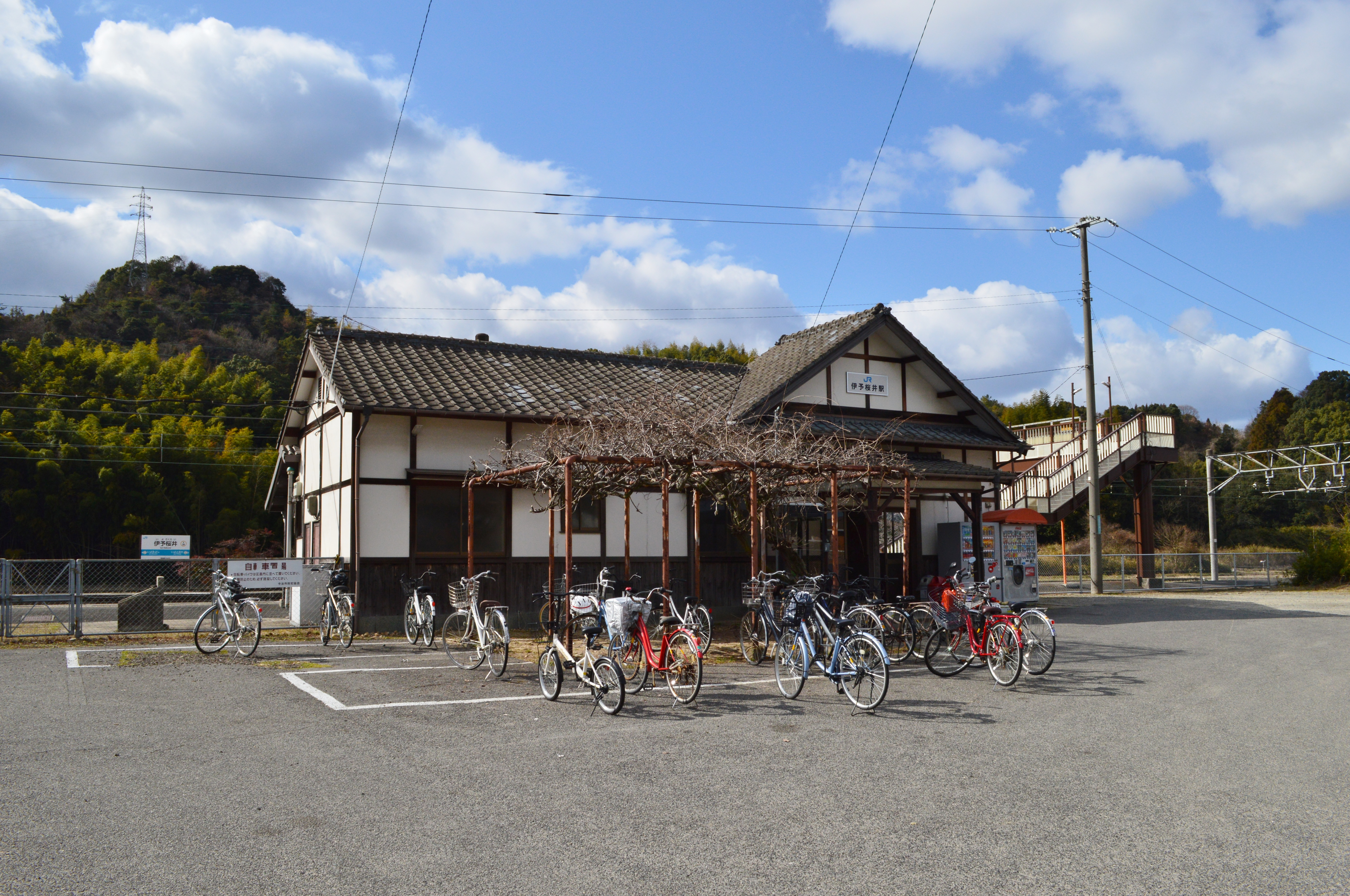
- Iyo-Sakurai Station, January 2018

General information
- Location: 2-5 Gōzakurai, Imabari-shi, Ehime-ken 799-1523; Japan
- Coordinates: 34°00′42″N 133°02′09″E
- Operator: JR Shikoku
- Line: ■ Yosan Line
- Distance: 137.8 km from Takamatsu Station
- Platforms: 2 side platforms
- Tracks: 2

Construction
- Structure type: At grade
- Parking: Available
- Cycle facilities: Bike shed
- Accessible: No - platforms linked by footbridge

Other information
- Status: Unstaffed
- Station code: Y38

History
- Opened: 21 December 1923

Passengers
- FY2019: 564
Location
- Location within Ehime Prefecture Location within Japan

Iyo-Sakurai Station (伊予桜井駅, Iyo-Sakurai-eki) is a passenger railway station located in the city of Imabari, Ehime Prefecture, Japan. It is operated by JR Shikoku and has the station number "Y38".

== Lines ==
Iyo-Sakurai Station is served by the JR Shikoku Yosan Line and is located 137.8 km from the beginning of the line at Takamatsu Station. Only Yosan Line local trains stop at the station and they only serve the sector between Iyo-Saijō and Matsuyama. Connections with other local or limited express trains are needed to travel further east or west along the line.

== Layout ==
The station consists of two opposed side platforms serving two tracks. Track 1 is a passing loop and served by platform 1, attached to the station building. Track 2, served by platform 2, is a straight track. Access to platform 2 is by means of a footbridge. The station building is unstaffed and serves only as a waiting room. Parking is available at the station forecourt where a bike shelter has also been erected.

== Adjacent stations ==
| « | Service | » |
Yosan Line
| Iyo-Miyoshi | Local | Iyo-Tomita |

== History ==
Iyo-Sakurai Station opened on 21 December 1923 as the terminus of the then Sanyo Line which had been extended westwards from Iyo-Miyoshi. It became a through station on 11 February 1924 when the line was further extended to Imabari. At that time the station was operated by Japanese Government Railways, later becoming Japanese National Railways (JNR). With the privatization of JNR on 1 April 1987, control of the station passed to JR Shikoku.

== Surrounding area ==
- Japan National Route 196
- Imabari-Komatsu Expressway Imabari-Yunoura IC
- Tsunashiki Tenman-gu
- Iyo Kokubun-ji (about 2 km from the station)
- Ehime Prefectural Imabari Higashi Secondary School

== See also ==
- List of railway stations in Japan
