= Iyo-Miyoshi Station =

Railway station in Saijō, Ehime Prefecture, Japan

Y37 Iyo-Miyoshi Station 伊予三芳駅
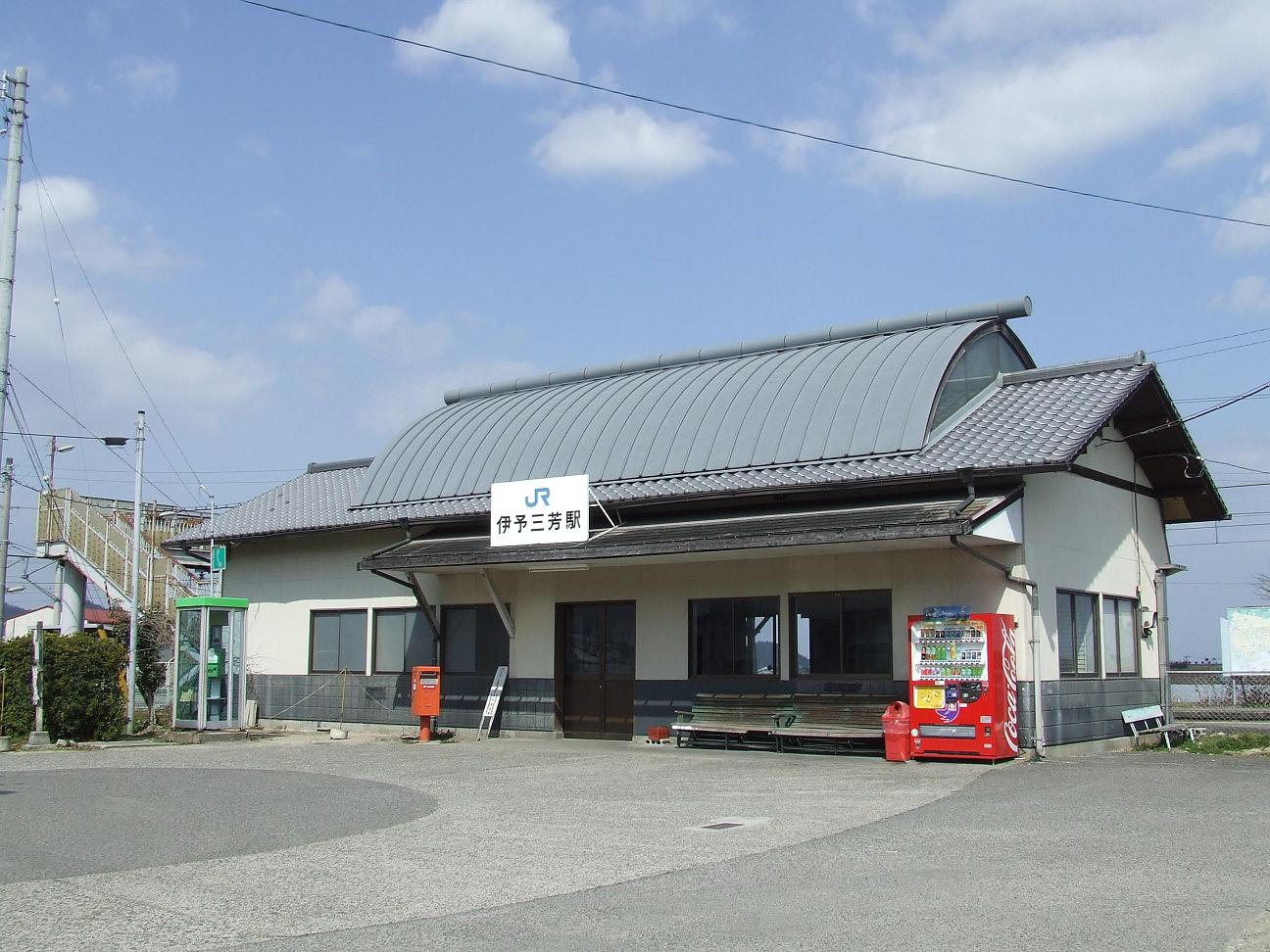
- Iyo-Miyoshi Station in 2008

General information
- Location: Miyoshi, Saijō-shi, Ehime-ken 799-1301; Japan
- Coordinates: 33°57′15″N 133°03′51″E
- Operator: JR Shikoku
- Line: ■ Yosan Line
- Distance: 130.2 km from Takamatsu
- Platforms: 2 side platforms
- Tracks: 2 + several sidings

Construction
- Structure type: At grade
- Accessible: No - platforms linked by footbridge

Other information
- Status: Unstaffed
- Station code: Y37

History
- Opened: 1 October 1923
- Rebuilt: ,

Passengers
- FY2019: 404
Location
- Location within Ehime Prefecture Location within Japan

Iyo-Miyoshi Station (伊予三芳駅, Iyo-Miyoshi-eki) is a passenger railway station located in the city of Saijō, Ehime Prefecture, Japan. It is operated by JR Shikoku and has the station number "Y37".

== Lines ==
Iyo-Miyoshi is served by the JR Shikoku Yosan Line and is located 130.2 km from the beginning of the line at Takamatsu Station. Only Yosan Line local trains stop at the station and they only serve the sector between Iyo-Saijō and Matsuyama. Connections with other local or limited express trains are needed to travel further east or west along the line.

== Layout ==
The station consists of two opposed side platforms serving two tracks. Track 1 is a passing loop and served by platform 1, attached to the station building. Track 2, served by platform 2, is a straight track. Access to platform 2 is by means of a footbridge. The station building is unstaffed and serves only as a waiting room. Parking is available at the station forecourt. There is also a refuge siding branching off track 1 which ends near the station building. Short stub sidings branch off elsewhere on both tracks.

== Adjacent stations ==
«	Service	»
Yosan Line
Nyūgawa	Local	Iyo-Sakurai

== History ==
Iyo-Miyoshi Station opened on 1 October 1923 as the terminus of the then Sanuki Line (讃岐線) when it had been extended westwards from Nyūgawa. On the same day, the line was renamed the Sanyo Line (讃予線). Iyo-Miyoshi became a through station on 21 December 1923 when the line was further extended to Iyo-Sakurai. At that time the station was operated by Japanese Government Railways, later becoming Japanese National Railways (JNR). With the privatization of JNR on 1 April 1987, control of the station passed to JR Shikoku.

== Surrounding area ==
- Miyoshi Town Office (former)

== See also ==
- List of railway stations in Japan
