= Iyo-Kameoka Station =

Railway station in Imabari, Ehime Prefecture, Japan

Y44 Iyo-Kameoka Station 伊予亀岡駅
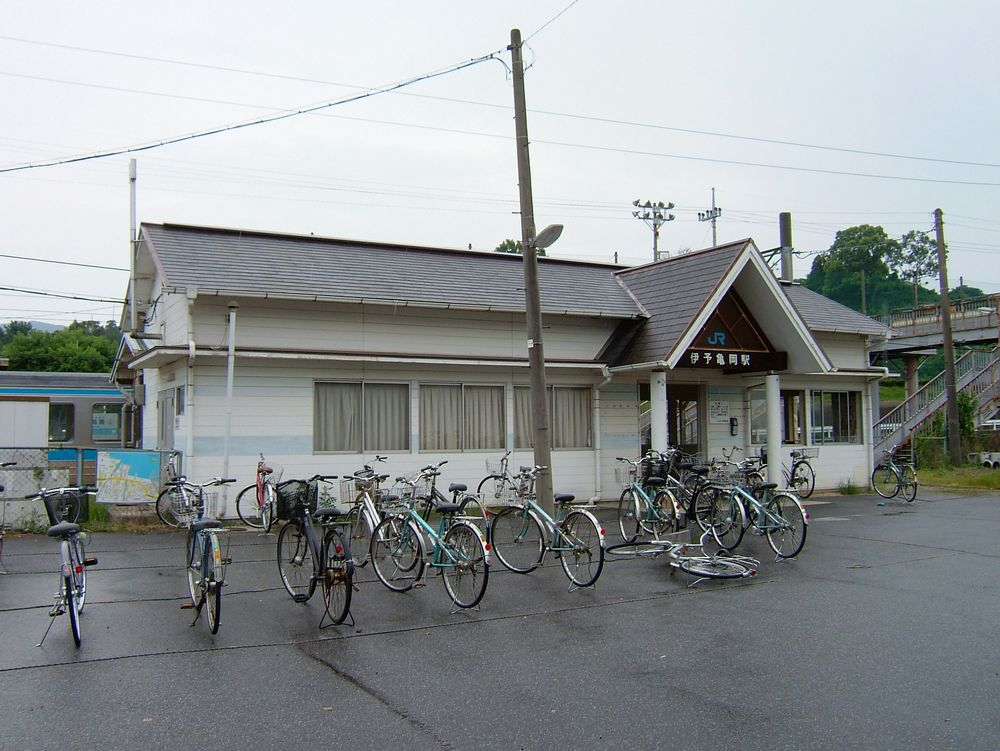
- Iyo-Kameoka Station, August 2006

General information
- Location: Kikumacho Sagata, Imabari-shi, Ehime-ken 799-2301; Japan
- Coordinates: 34°03′14″N 132°52′27″E
- Operator: JR Shikoku
- Line: ■ Yosan Line
- Distance: 161.9 km from Takamatsu
- Platforms: 1 side + 1 island platform
- Tracks: 3

Construction
- Structure type: At grade
- Parking: Available
- Accessible: No - platforms linked by footbridge

Other information
- Status: Unstaffed
- Station code: Y44

History
- Opened: 21 June 1925; 101 years ago

Passengers
- FY2019: 154
Location
- Location within Ehime Prefecture Location within Japan

Iyo-Kameoka Station (伊予亀岡駅, Iyo-Kameoka-eki) is a passenger railway station located in the city of Imabari, Ehime Prefecture, Japan. It is operated by JR Shikoku and has the station number "Y44".

== Lines ==
Iyo-Kameoka Station is served by the JR Shikoku Yosan Line and is located 161.9 km from the beginning of the line at Takamatsu Station. Only Yosan Line local trains stop at the station and they only serve the sector between Iyo-Saijō and Matsuyama. Connections with other local or limited express trains are needed to travel further east or west along the line.

== Layout ==
The station, which is unstaffed, consists of a side platform and an island platform serving three tracks. A station building serves as a waiting room and is linked to platform 1. Access to platforms 2 and 3 on the island is by means of a footbridge. Parking is available at the station forecourt.

== Adjacent stations ==
«	Service	»
Yosan Line
Ōnishi	Local	Kikuma

== History ==
Iyo-Kameoka Station opened on 21 June 1925 as an intermediate stop when the then Sanyo Line was extended westwards from Ōnishi to Kikuma. At that time the station was operated by Japanese Government Railways, later becoming Japanese National Railways (JNR). With the privatization of JNR on 1 April 1987, control of the station passed to JR Shikoku.

== Surrounding area ==
- Imabari City Kameoka Elementary School
- Kikuma National Oil Stockpile Base

== See also ==
- List of railway stations in Japan
