= Kōyōdai Station =

Railway station in Matsuyama, Ehime Prefecture, Japan

Y51 Kōyōdai Station 光洋台駅
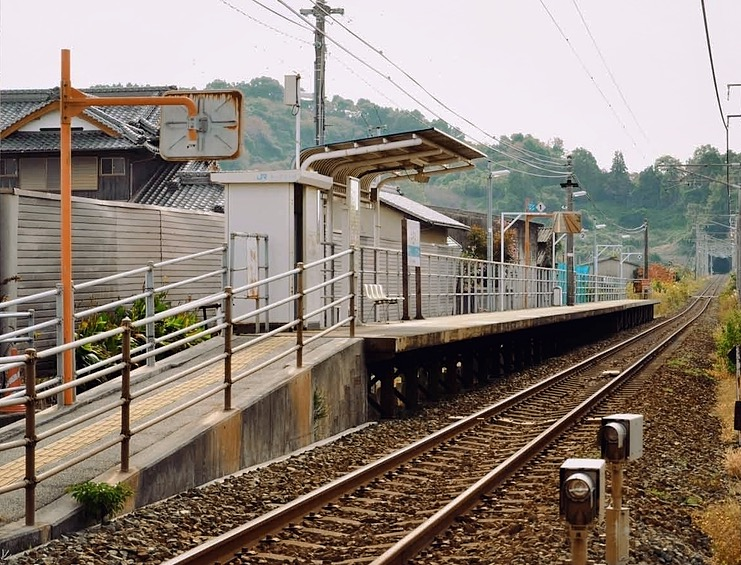
- Kōyōdai Station in November 2018

General information
- Location: Ogawa, Matsuyama-shi, Ehime-ken 799-2468; Japan
- Coordinates: 33°55′36″N 132°45′39″E
- Operator: JR Shikoku
- Line: ■ Yosan Line
- Distance: 182.3 km from Takamatsu
- Platforms: 1 side platform
- Tracks: 1

Construction
- Structure type: At grade
- Cycle facilities: Designated parking area for bicycles
- Accessible: Yes - ramp from access road to platform

Other information
- Status: Unstaffed
- Station code: Y51

History
- Opened: 1 November 1986

Passengers
- FY2019: 252
Location
- Location within Ehime Prefecture Location within Japan

Kōyōdai Station (光洋台駅, Kōyōdai-eki) is a passenger railway station located in the city of Matsuyama, Ehime Prefecture, Japan. It is operated by JR Shikoku and has the station number "Y51".

== Lines ==
'Kōyōdai Station is served by the JR Shikoku Yosan Line and is located 182.3 km from the beginning of the line at Takamatsu. Only Yosan Line local trains stop at the station and they only serve the sector between Iyo-Saijō and Matsuyama. Connections with other local or limited express trains are needed to travel further east or west along the line.

== Layout ==
The station, which is unstaffed, consists of a side platform serving a single track. There is no station building, only a shelter for waiting passengers and a "tickets corner", a small shelter containing an automatic ticket vending machine. A ramp leads from the access road to the platform. A designated space for the parking of bicycles is provided behind the platform.

== Adjacent stations ==
| « | Service | » |
Yosan Line
| Awai | Local | Horie |

== History ==
Japanese National Railways (JNR) opened 'Kōyōdai Station as a new stop on the existing Yosan Line on 1 November 1986 as Koyoda Temporary Stop (臨時乗こうようだ降場, Rinji-jō Kōyōda fu ba). With the privatization of JNR on 1 April 1987, JR Shikoku assumed control and renamed it Kōyōdai Station.

== Surrounding area ==
- Japan National Route 196.

== See also ==
- List of railway stations in Japan
