= Ōura Station =

Railway station in Matsuyama, Ehime Prefecture, Japan

Y47 Ōura Station 大浦駅
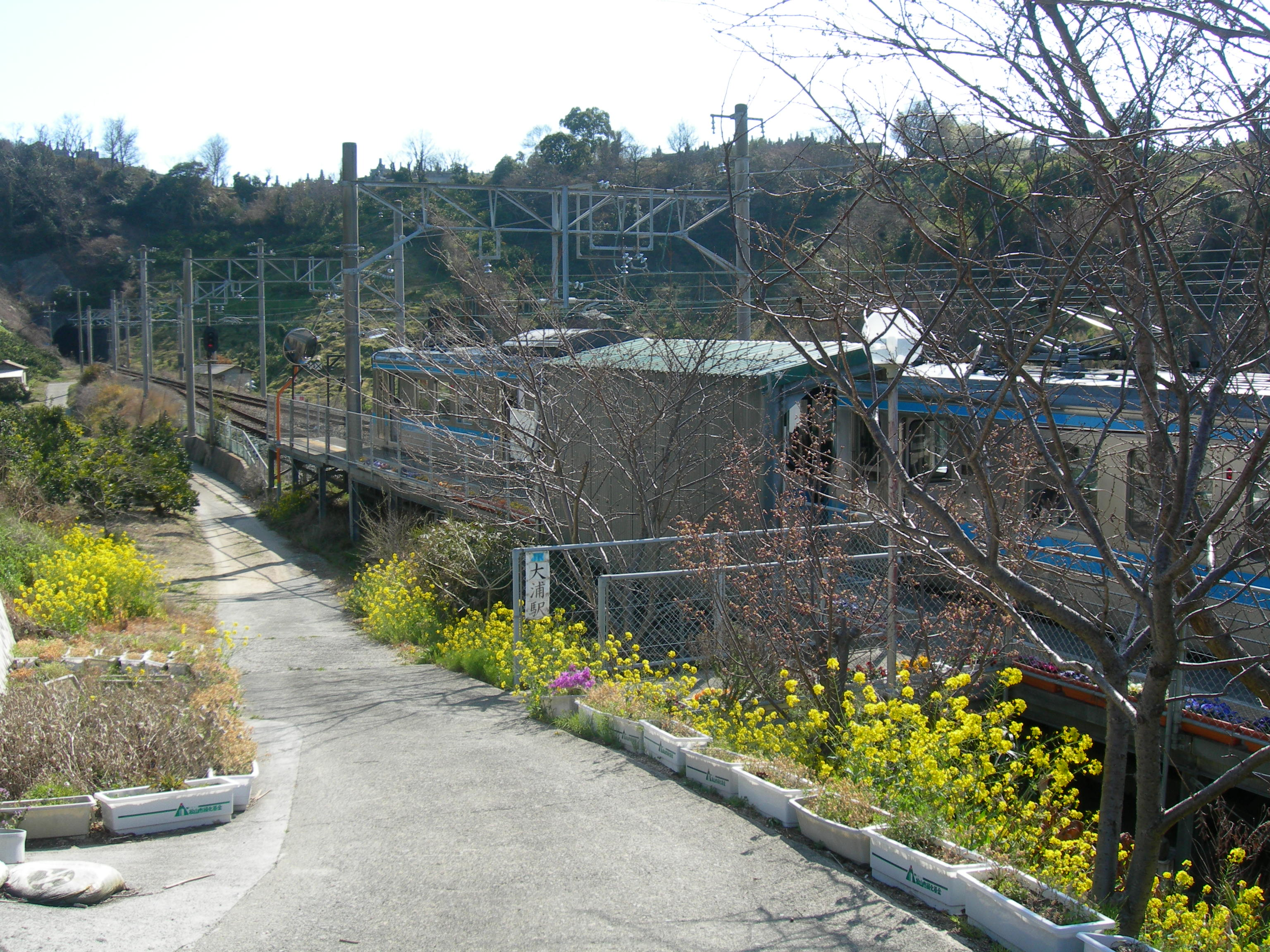
- Ōura Station in 2008

General information
- Location: Oura, Matsuyama-shi, Ehime-ken 799-2408; Japan
- Coordinates: 34°00′01″N 132°46′32″E
- Operator: JR Shikoku
- Line: ■ Yosan Line
- Distance: 173.8 km from Takamatsu
- Platforms: 1 side platform
- Tracks: 1 + 1 passing line

Construction
- Structure type: At grade
- Accessible: Yes - ramp from access road leads to platform

Other information
- Status: Unstaffed
- Station code: Y47

History
- Opened: 16 March 1991

Passengers
- FY2019: 46
Location
- Location within Ehime Prefecture Location within Japan

Ōura Station (大浦駅, Ōura-eki) is a passenger railway station located in the city of Matsuyama, Ehime, Japan. It is operated by JR Shikoku and has the station number "Y47".

== Lines ==
Ōura Station is served by the JR Shikoku Yosan Line and is located 173.8 km from the beginning of the line at Takamatsu. Only Yosan Line local trains stop at the station and they only serve the sector between Iyo-Saijō and Matsuyama. Connections with other local or limited express trains are needed to travel further east or west along the line.

== Layout ==
The station consists of a straight track and a passing loop. Only the passing loop is served by the single side platform which the straight track is used by trains which do not stop at the station. There is no station building, only a shelter on the platform for waiting passengers. A ramp leads from the access road to the platform.

== Adjacent stations ==
| « | Service | » |
Yosan Line
| Asanami | Local | Iyo-Hōjō |

== History ==
Ōura Signal Box (大浦信号場, Ōura-shingō-ba) was opened by JR Shikoku on 21 November 1990 on the Yosan Line. It was upgraded to a passenger station on 16 March 1991.

== Surrounding area ==
- Japan National Route 198.

== See also ==
- List of railway stations in Japan
