= Myōkensan Kofun =

Burial mound in Japan

- 妙見山古墳 (Japanese)
- Myōkensan Kofun Myōkensan Kofun (Japan)
- Interactive map of Myōkensan Kofun
- 34°3′31.39″N 132°55′50.97″E
- Type: Kofun
- Periods: Kofun period
- Location: Imabari, Ehime, Japan
- Region: Shikoku region

History
- Built: 5th century

Site notes
- Elevation: 80 m (260 ft)
- Length: 56 m (184 ft)
- Excavation dates: 1990-1993
- Public access: Yes

The Myōkensan Kofun (妙見山古墳) is a Kofun period burial mound, located in the Onishi neighborhood of the city of Imabari, Ehime on the island of Shikoku in Japan. It was designated a National Historic Site of Japan in 2010. It is the largest rectangular burial mound in Shikoku.

== Overview ==
The Myōkensan Kofun is located on a hill with an elevation of 80 meters overlooking Itsuki Bay of the Seto Inland Sea. It is one of a cluster of three keyhole-shaped burial mounds zenpō-kōen-fun (前方後円墳), which are shaped like a keyhole, having one square end and one circular end, when viewed from above. Preliminary archaeological excavation of the first tumulus was undertaken from 1990 to 1993. The tumulus's orientated to the east and has a total length 56 meters. It sits of a partially excavated granite bedrock and was made with rammed earth. Two burial chambers were found, one in the posterior circular portion (Chamber No.1) and one in the anterior rectangular portion (Chamber No.2). In both cases, the main axis of the burial chambers was set in the east-west direction (west head position) parallel to the main axis of the mound, and grave goods were found inside. Chamber No.1 measured 10.8 by, 5.6 meters, and 2 meters high and contained a round mark with a diameter of 16 to 18 cm, believed to have been a bronze mirror. Chamber No.2 was smaller, but contained an intact Chinese bronze mirror with a diameter of 11.3 cm. Other grave goods included iron swords, iron axes, and an iron harpoon. Thousands of earthenware fragments were unearthed from the foot of the tumulus, most of which are fragments of double-mouthed jars and trapezoidal haniwa, which are believed to be from the early Kofun period. No fukiishi have been found.

Overall length
56 meters
Posterior circular portion
39 meter diameter x 7 meters high, 2-tier

- Constriction width: 25.5 meters

Anterior rectangular portion
33 meters wide x 4 meters high, 2-tier

Currently, the tumulus has been covered for preservation, and the ceiling stone has been relocated outside the mound for display. The surrounding area has been developed as the Fujiyama Health and Culture Park, and the Onishi Fujiyama Historical Museum (大西藤山歴史資料館) displays restored stone coffins and excavated items. The site is located about 25 minutes on foot from JR Shikoku Yosan Line Onishi Station.

== See also ==
- List of Historic Sites of Japan (Ehime)
