= Namikata Station =

Railway station in Imabari, Ehime Prefecture, Japan

Y42 Namikata Station 波方駅
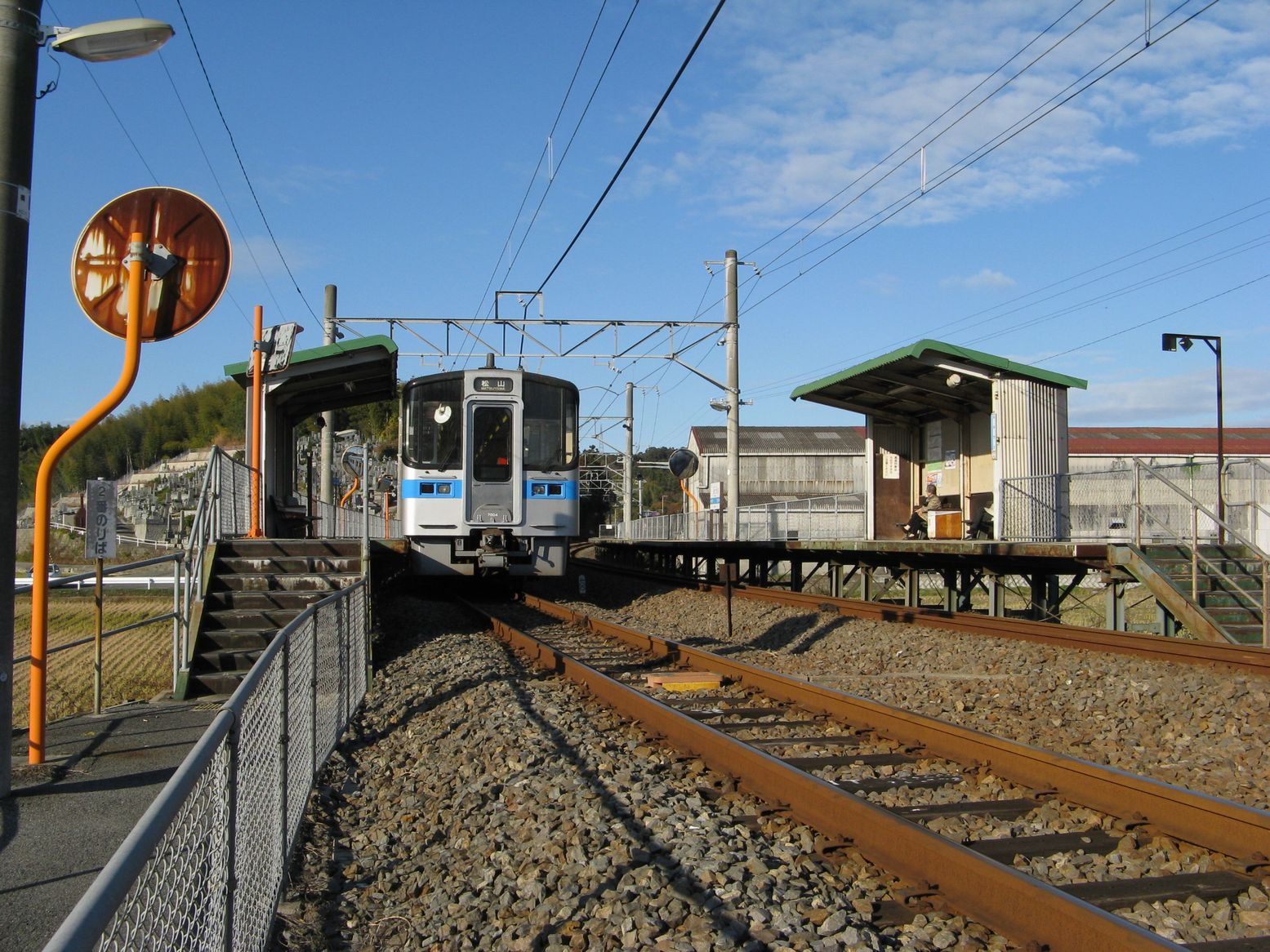
- Namikata Station, December 2008

General information
- Location: Namikatacho Hinokuchi, Imabari-shi, Ehime-ken 799-2102; Japan
- Coordinates: 34°05′42″N 132°56′35″E
- Operator: JR Shikoku
- Line: ■ Yosan Line
- Distance: 152.3 km from Takamatsu
- Platforms: 2 side platforms
- Tracks: 2

Construction
- Structure type: At grade
- Parking: Available
- Cycle facilities: Bike shed
- Accessible: No - steps to platforms

Other information
- Status: Unstaffed
- Station code: Y42

History
- Opened: 1 March 1960

Passengers
- FY2019: 136
Location
- Location within Ehime Prefecture Location within Japan

Namikata Station (波方駅, Namikata-eki) is a passenger railway station located in the city of Imabari, Ehime Prefecture, Japan. It is operated by JR Shikoku and has the station number "Y42".

== Lines ==
Namikata Station is served by the JR Shikoku Yosan Line and is located 152.3 km from the beginning of the line at Takamatsu Station. Only Yosan Line local trains stop at the station and they only serve the sector between Iyo-Saijō and Matsuyama. Connections with other local or limited express trains are needed to travel further east or west along the line.

== Layout ==
The station, which is unstaffed, consists of two opposed side platforms serving two tracks. There is no station building, only weather shelters on the platforms. The entrance to the station is located at a road level crossing 100 metres away. From there, two long footpaths run parallel and on either side of the tracks, leading to the platforms. To cross from one platform to the other, it is necessary to walk down one footpath to the level crossing and then up the other. Parking lots, a bike shed and a toilet are also provided near the level crossing.

== Adjacent stations ==
«	Service	»
Yosan Line
Hashihama	Local	Ōnishi

== History ==
Japanese National Railways (JNR) opened Namikata Station on 1 March 1960 as a new station on the existing Yosan Line. With the privatization of JNR on 1 April 1987, control of the station passed to JR Shikoku.

== Surrounding area ==
- Imabari City Hall Namikata Branch
- Imabari City Namikata Library

== See also ==
- List of railway stations in Japan
