= Iyo-Tomita Station =

Railway station in Imabari, Ehime Prefecture, Japan

Y39 Iyo-Tomita Station 伊予富田駅
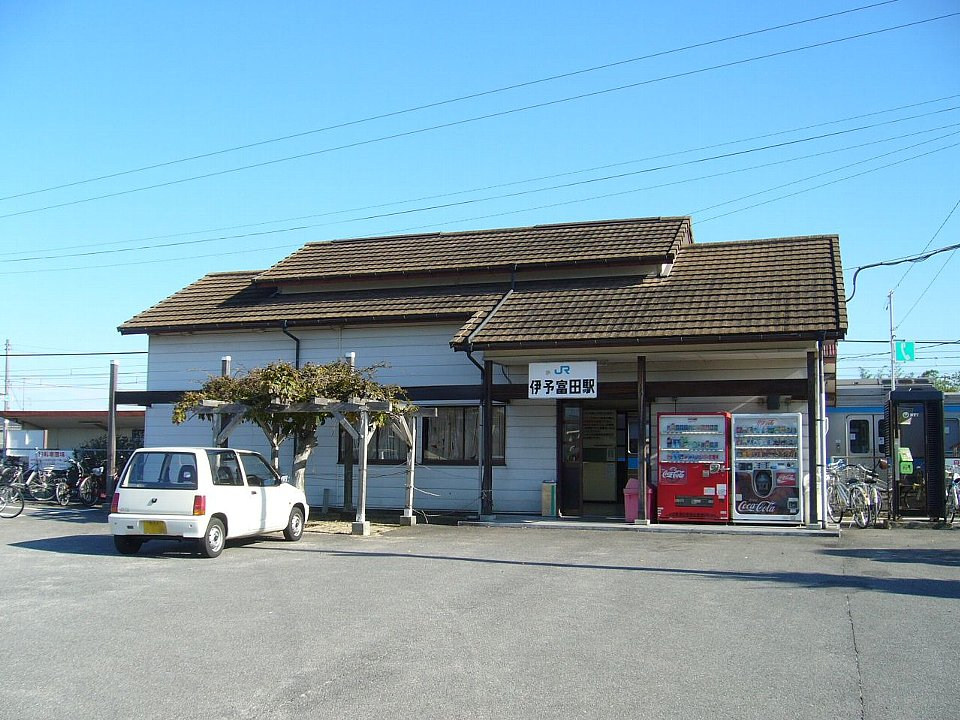
- Iyo-Tomita Station in 2006

General information
- Location: Kamitoku, Imabari-shi, Ehime-ken 799-1511; Japan
- Coordinates: 34°02′11″N 133°00′33″E
- Operator: JR Shikoku
- Line: ■ Yosan Line
- Distance: 141.6 km from Takamatsu
- Platforms: 2 side platforms
- Tracks: 2 + 1 siding

Construction
- Structure type: At grade
- Parking: Available
- Accessible: No - platforms linked by footbridge

Other information
- Status: Unstaffed
- Station code: Y39

History
- Opened: 11 February 1924

Passengers
- FY2019: 240
Location
- Location within Ehime Prefecture Location within Japan

Iyo-Tomita Station (伊予富田駅, Iyo-Tomita-eki) is a passenger railway station located in the city of Imabari, Ehime Prefecture, Japan. It is operated by JR Shikoku and has the station number "Y39".

== Lines ==
Iyo-Tomita Station is served by the JR Shikoku Yosan Line and is located 141.6 km from the beginning of the line at Takamatsu Station. Only Yosan Line local trains stop at the station and they only serve the sector between Iyo-Saijō and Matsuyama. Connections with other local or limited express trains are needed to travel further east or west along the line.

== Layout ==
The station consists of two opposed side platforms serving two tracks. The station building is unstaffed and serves only as a waiting room. Access to the opposite platform, which also has a weather shelter, is by means of a footbridge. Parking is available at the station forecourt. A siding branches off line 1 and leads to a vehicle shed.

== Adjacent stations ==
«	Service	»
Yosan Line
Iyo-Sakurai	Local	Imabari

== History ==
Iyo-Tomita Station opened on 11 February 1924 as an intermediate stop when the then Sanyo Line was extended westwards from Iyo-Sakurai to Imabari. At that time the station was operated by Japanese Government Railways, later becoming Japanese National Railways (JNR). With the privatization of JNR on 1 April 1987, control of the station passed to JR Shikoku.

== Surrounding area ==
- Imabari Municipal Tomita Elementary School

== See also ==
- List of railway stations in Japan
