= Yanagihara Station (Ehime) =

Railway station in Matsuyama, Ehime Prefecture, Japan

Y49 Yanagihara Station 柳原駅
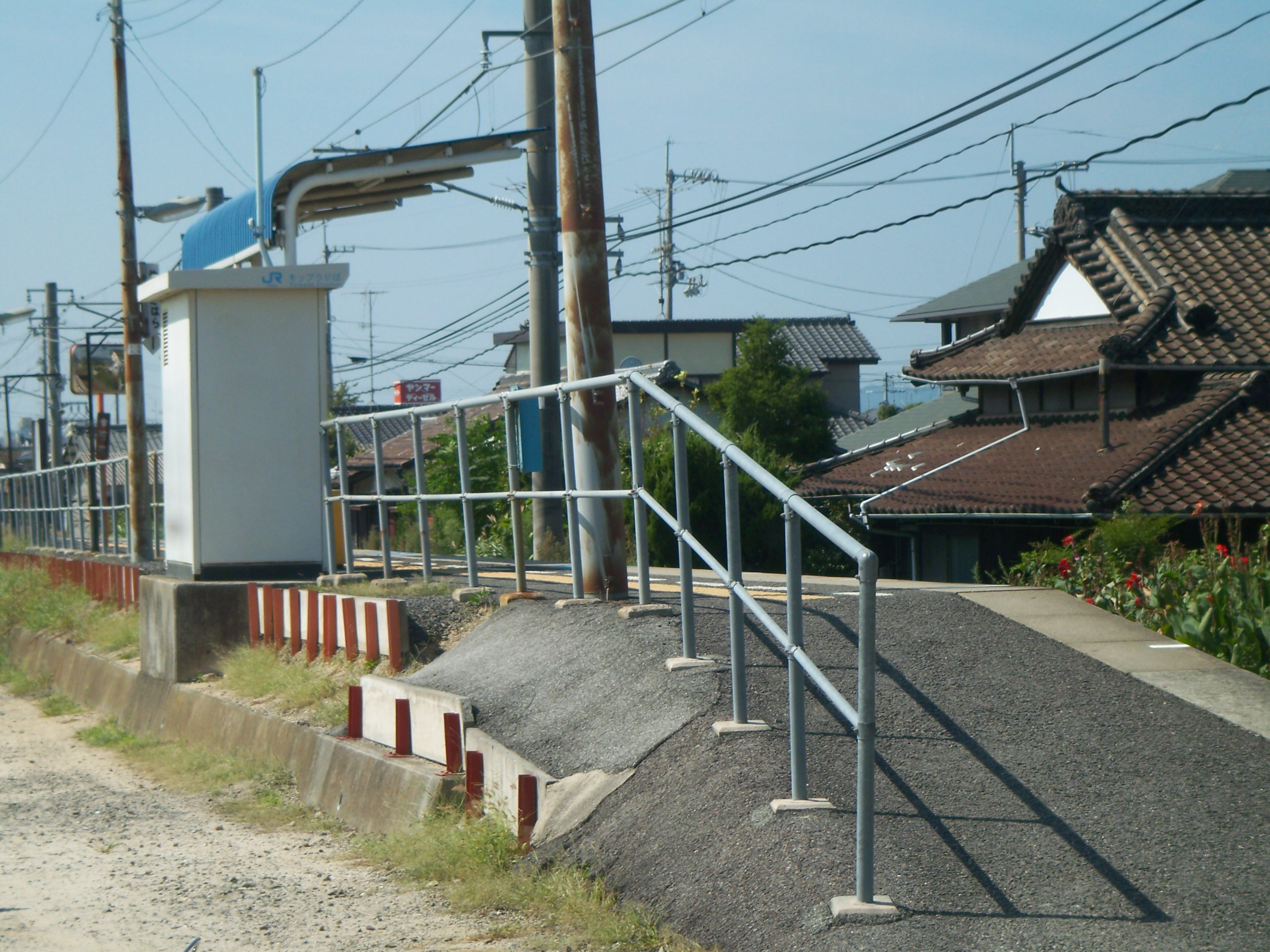
- Yanagihara Station in 2006

General information
- Location: Fuchu, Matsuyama-shi, Ehime-ken 799-2435; Japan
- Coordinates: 33°57′13″N 132°46′25″E
- Operator: JR Shikoku
- Line: ■ Yosan Line
- Distance: 179.1 km from Takamatsu
- Platforms: 1 side platform
- Tracks: 1

Construction
- Structure type: At grade
- Parking: None
- Cycle facilities: Designated parking area for bicycles
- Accessible: Yes - ramp from access road to platform

Other information
- Status: Unstaffed
- Station code: Y49

History
- Opened: 1 June 1961

Passengers
- FY2019: 268
Location
- Location within Ehime Prefecture Location within Japan

Yanagihara Station (柳原駅, Yanagihara-eki) is a passenger railway station located in the city of Matsuyama, Ehime Prefecture, Japan. It is operated by JR Shikoku and has the station number "Y49".

== Lines ==
Yanagihara Station is served by the JR Shikoku Yosan Line and is located 179.1 km from the beginning of the line at Takamatsu. Only Yosan Line local trains stop at the station and they only serve the sector between Iyo-Saijō and Matsuyama. Connections with other local or limited express trains are needed to travel further east or west along the line.

== Layout ==
The station, which is unstaffed, consists of a side platform serving a single track. There is no station building, only a shelter for waiting passengers and a "tickets corner", a small shelter containing an automatic ticket vending machine. A ramp leads from the access road to the platform. A designated space for the parking of bicycles is provided behind the platform.

== Adjacent stations ==
«	Service	»
Yosan Line
Iyo-Hōjō	Local	Awai

== History ==
Japanese National Railways (JNR) opened Yanagihara Station as a new stop on the existing Yosan Line on 1 June 1961. With the privatization of JNR on 1 April 1987, control of the station passed to JR Shikoku.

== Surrounding area ==
- Japan National Route 196

== See also ==
- List of railway stations in Japan
