= Kikuma Station =

Railway station in Imabari, Ehime Prefecture, Japan

Y45 Kikuma Station 菊間駅
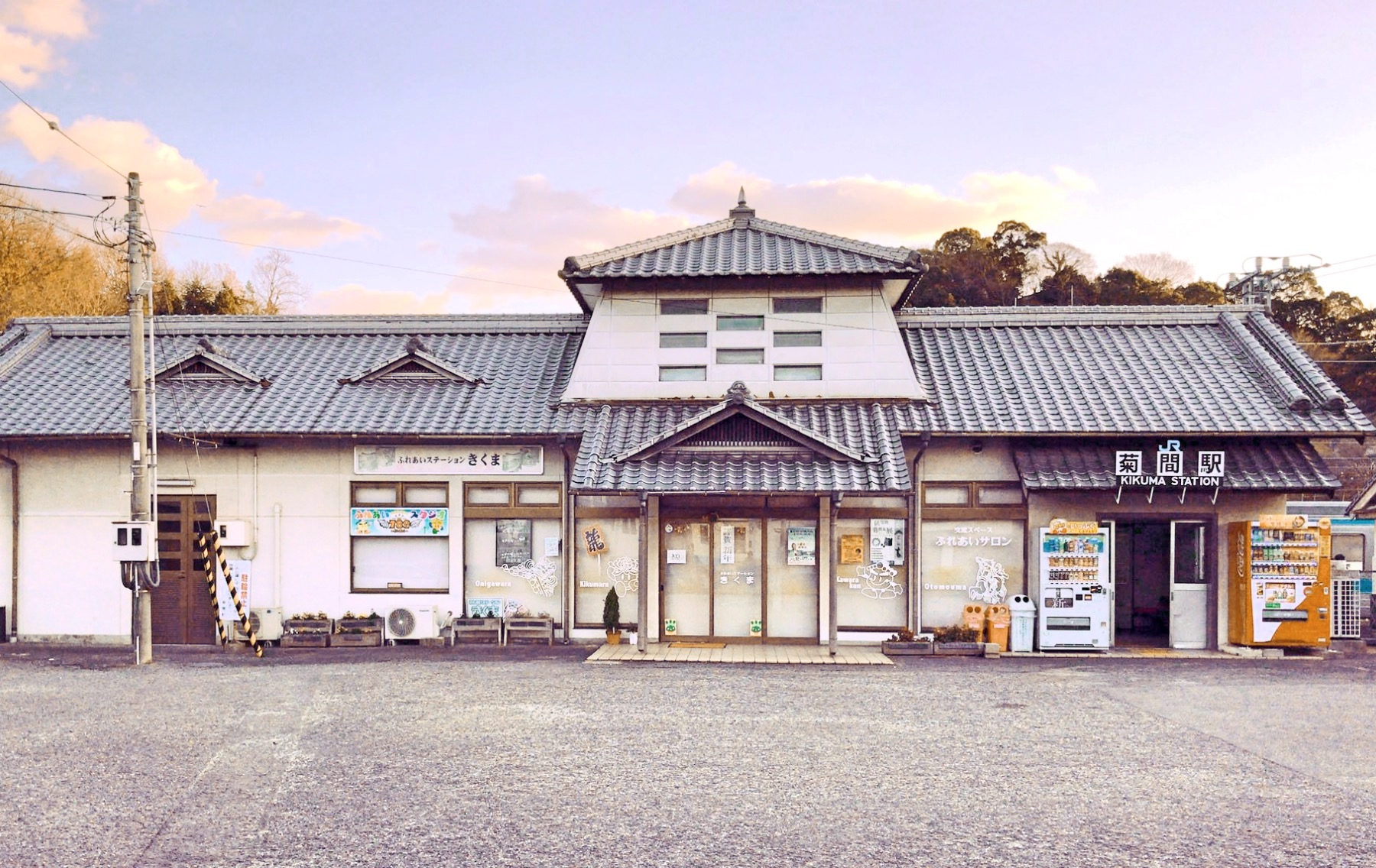
- Kikuma Station

General information
- Location: Kikumachohama, Imabari-shi, Ehime-ken 799-2303; Japan
- Coordinates: 34°02′00″N 132°50′27″E
- Operator: JR Shikoku
- Line: ■ Yosan Line
- Distance: 165.9 km from Takamatsu
- Platforms: 2 side platforms
- Tracks: 2 + 1 siding

Construction
- Structure type: At grade
- Parking: Available
- Cycle facilities: Designated parking area for bicycles
- Accessible: No - platforms linked by footbridge

Other information
- Status: Unstaffed
- Station code: Y45

History
- Opened: 21 June 1925; 101 years ago

Passengers
- FY2019: 416

Services
Preceding station	JR Shikoku	Following station
Asanami towards Uwajima	Yosan Line Local	Iyo-Kameoka towards Takamatsu
Location
- Location within Ehime Prefecture Location within Japan

Kikuma Station (菊間駅, Kikuma-eki) is a passenger railway station located in the city of Imabari, Ehime Prefecture, Japan. It is operated by JR Shikoku and has the station number "Y45".

== Lines ==
Kikuma Station is served by the JR Shikoku Yosan Line and is located 165.9 km from the beginning of the line at Takamatsu Station. Only Yosan Line local trains stop at the station and they only serve the sector between Iyo-Saijō and Matsuyama. Connections with other local or limited express trains are needed to travel further east or west along the line.

== Layout ==
The station, which is unstaffed, consists of two staggered opposed side platforms serving two tracks. A station building serves as a waiting room and is linked to platform 1. Access to platform 2 is by means of a footbridge. Parking is available at the station forecourt and there is a designated parking area for bicycles. A siding branches off line 1 and leads to an area behind and to one side of the station building and is used mainly by track maintenance equipment.

== History ==
Kikuma Station opened on 21 June 1925 as the terminus of the then Sanyo Line when it was extended westwards from Ōnishi. It became a through-station on 28 March 1926 when the line was further extended to Iyo-Hōjō. At that time the station was operated by Japanese Government Railways, later becoming Japanese National Railways (JNR). With the privatization of JNR on 1 April 1987, control of the station passed to JR Shikoku.

== Surrounding area ==
- Kawara no Furusato Park
- Imabari City Hall Kikuma Branch
- Japan National Route 196

== See also ==
- List of railway stations in Japan
