= Awai Station =

Railway station in Matsuyama, Ehime Prefecture, Japan

Y50 Awai Station 粟井駅
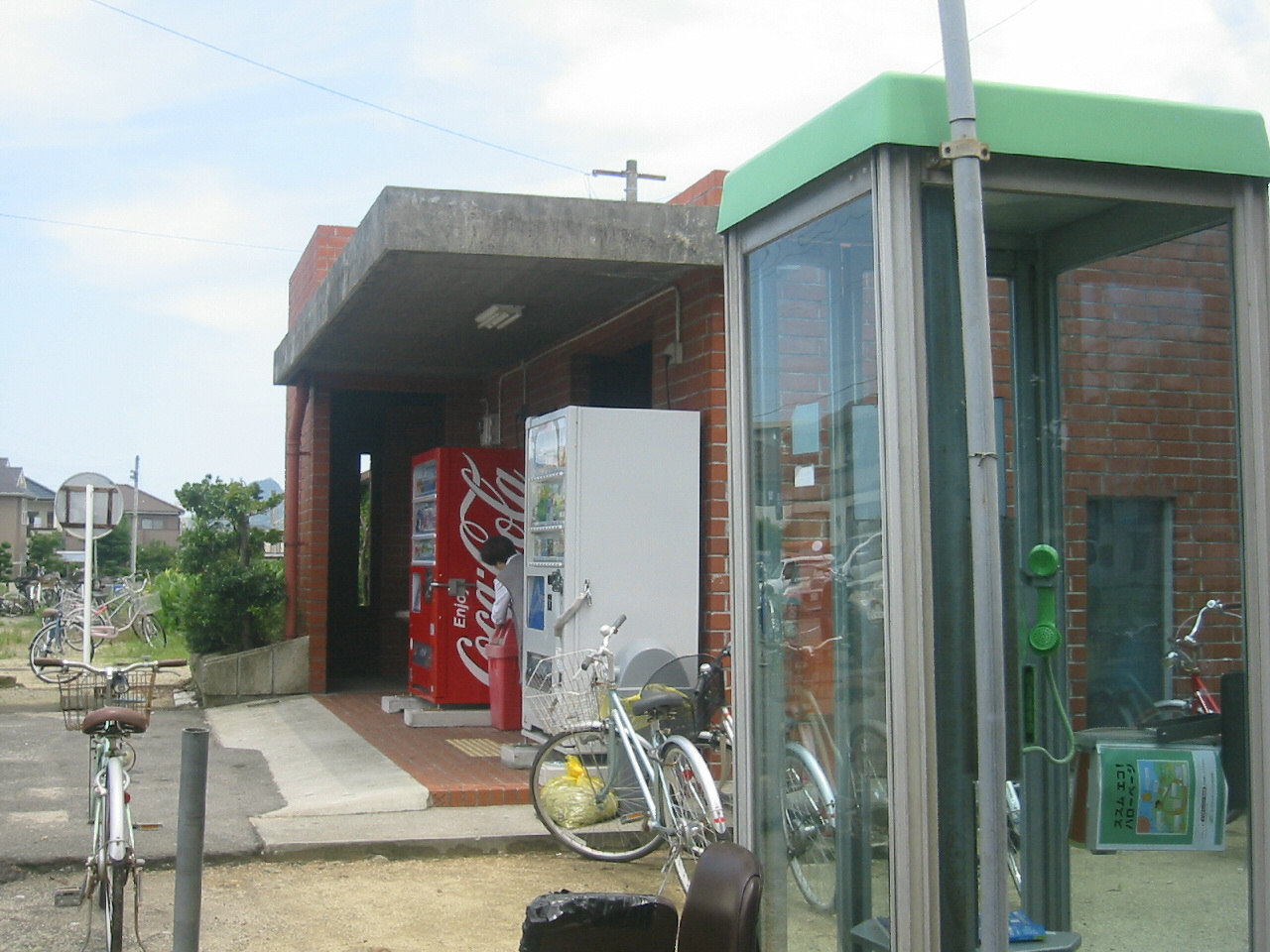
- Awai Station in 2010

General information
- Location: Kanomine, Matsuyama-shi, Ehime-ken 799-2461; Japan
- Coordinates: 33.9430°N 132.7703°E
- Operator: JR Shikoku
- Line: ■ Yosan Line
- Distance: 180.3 km from Takamatsu
- Platforms: 2 side platforms
- Tracks: 2

Construction
- Structure type: At grade
- Accessible: No - platforms linked by footbridge

Other information
- Status: Unstaffed
- Station code: Y50

History
- Opened: 3 April 1927

Passengers
- FY2019: 794
Location
- Location within Ehime Prefecture Location within Japan

Awai Station (粟井駅, Awai-eki) is a passenger railway station located in the city of Matsuyama, Ehime Prefecture, Japan. It is operated by JR Shikoku and has the station number "Y50".

== Lines ==
Awai Station is served by the JR Shikoku Yosan Line and is located 180.3 km from the beginning of the line at Takamatsu. Only Yosan Line local trains stop at the station and they only serve the sector between Iyo-Saijō and Matsuyama. Connections with other local or limited express trains are needed to travel further east or west along the line.

== Layout ==
The station, which is unstaffed, consists of two opposed side platforms serving two tracks. A modern brickwork building serves as a waiting room and also houses an automatic ticket vending machine. Access to the opposite side platform is by means of a footbridge.

«	Service	»
Yosan Line
Yanagihara	Local	Kōyōdai

== History ==
Awai Station opened on 3 April 1927 as an intermediate stop when the then Sanyo Line was extended from Iyo-Hōjō to Matsuyama. At that time the station was operated by Japanese Government Railways, later becoming Japanese National Railways (JNR). With the privatization of JNR on 1 April 1987, control of the station passed to JR Shikoku.

== Surrounding area ==
- Japan National Route 196.

== See also ==
- List of railway stations in Japan
