= Nyūgawa Station (Ehime) =

Railway station in Saijō, Ehime Prefecture, Japan

Y36 Nyūgawa Station 壬生川駅
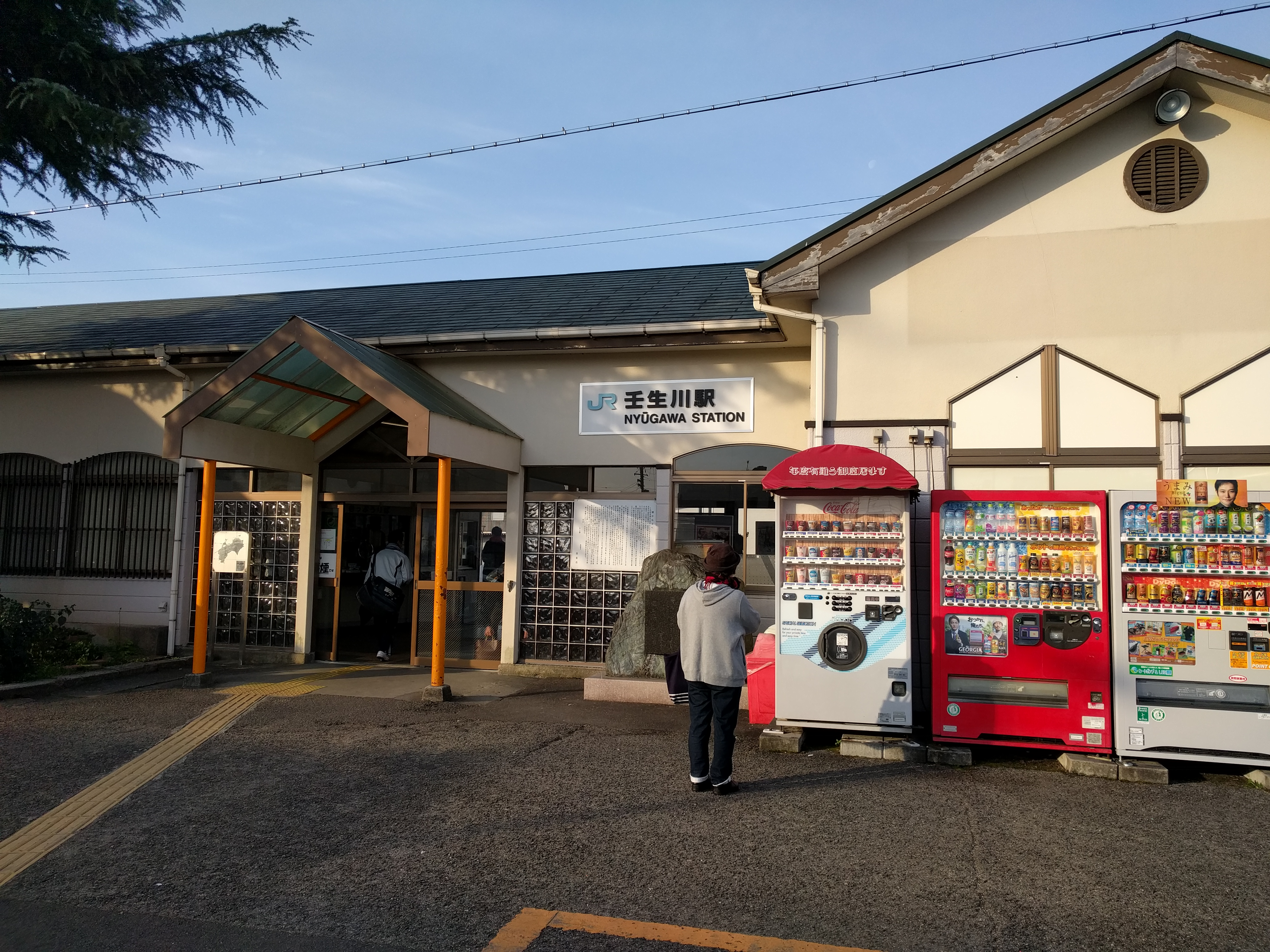
- Nyūgawa Station in 2017

General information
- Location: Japan
- Coordinates: 33°55′46″N 133°05′08″E
- Operator: JR Shikoku
- Line: ■ Yosan Line
- Distance: 126.8 km from Takamatsu
- Platforms: 1 side + 1 island platforms
- Tracks: 3 + 1 passing loop + other sidings

Construction
- Structure type: At grade
- Parking: Available
- Accessible: No - platforms linked by footbridge

Other information
- Status: Staffed - JR ticket window (Midori no Madoguchi)
- Station code: Y36
- Website: Official website

History
- Opened: 1 May 1923; 103 years ago

Passengers
- FY2019: 801
Location
- Location within Ehime Prefecture Location within Japan

Nyūgawa Station (壬生川駅, Nyūgawa-eki) is a passenger railway station located in the city of Saijō, Ehime Prefecture, Japan. It is operated by JR Shikoku and has the station number "Y36".

== Lines ==
Nyūgawa Station is served by the JR Shikoku Yosan Line and is located 126.8 km from the beginning of the line at Takamatsu. Yosan Line local trains which stop at the station only serve the sector between Iyo-Saijō and Matsuyama. Connections with other local or limited express trains are needed to travel further east or west along the line.

In addition, the following JR Shikoku limited express services also serve the station:

- Shiokaze - from Okayama to Matsuyama and Uwajima
- Ishizuchi - from Matsuyama to Takamatsu and Uwajima
- Midnight Express Matsuyama - in one direction only, from Matsuyama to Niihama
- Morning Express Matsuyama - in one direction only, from Niihama to Matsuyama

== Layout ==
The station consists of an island platform and a side platform serving three tracks. The station building houses a waiting room, a convenience store and a bakery, and a JR ticket window (with a Midori no Madoguchi facility). The island platform is accessed by means of a footbridge. Car parking is available.

A passing loop runs to the west of the island platform and several short sidings branch off the main tracks.

== Adjacent stations ==
«	Service	»
JR Limited Express Services
Iyo-Saijō	Shiokaze	Imabari
Iyo-Saijō	Ishizuchi	Imabari
Imabari	Midnight Express Matsuyama	Iyo-Saijō
Iyo-Saijō	Morning Express Matsuyama	Imabari
Yosan Line
Tamanoe	Local	Iyo-Miyoshi

== History ==
Nyūgawa Station opened on 1 May 1923 as the terminus of the then Sanuki Line which had been extended westwards from Iyo-Saijō. It became a through-station on 1 October 1923 when the line was further extended to Iyo-Miyoshi. At that time the station was operated by Japanese Government Railways, later becoming Japanese National Railways (JNR). With the privatization of JNR on 1 April 1987, control of the station passed to JR Shikoku.

== Surrounding area ==
- Saijo City Food Creation Center
- Pompoko Bridge
- Saijo City Hall Toyo General Branch (former Toyo City Hall)

== See also ==
- List of railway stations in Japan
