= Ōnishi Station =

Railway station in Imabari, Ehime Prefecture, Japan

Y43 Ōnishi Station 大西駅
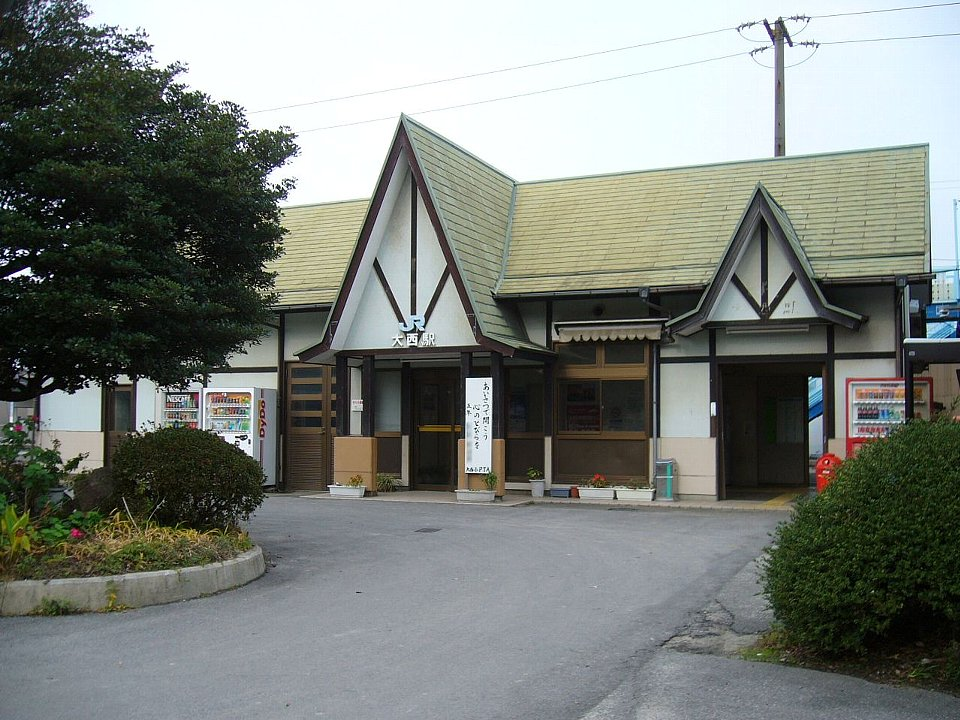
- Ōnishi Station in 2007

General information
- Location: Onishicho Shinmachi, Imabari-shi, Ehime-ken 799-2203; Japan
- Coordinates: 34°03′58″N 132°55′46″E
- Operator: JR Shikoku
- Line: ■ Yosan Line
- Distance: 156.4 km from Takamatsu
- Platforms: 1 side + 1 island platform
- Tracks: 2 + 1 passing loop

Construction
- Structure type: At grade
- Parking: Available
- Accessible: No - platforms linked by footbridge

Other information
- Status: Unstaffed
- Station code: Y43

History
- Opened: 1 December 1924; 101 years ago
- Former names: Iyo-Ōi

Passengers
- FY2019: 380
Location
- Location within Ehime Prefecture Location within Japan

Ōnishi Station (大西駅, Ōnishi eki) is a passenger railway station located in the city of Imabari, Ehime Prefecture, Japan. It is operated by JR Shikoku and has the station number "Y43".

== Lines ==
Ōnishi Station is served by the JR Shikoku Yosan Line and is located 156.4 km from the beginning of the line at Takamatsu. Only Yosan Line local trains stop at the station and they only serve the sector between Iyo-Saijō and Matsuyama. Connections with other local or limited express trains are needed to travel further east or west along the line.

== Layout ==
The station, which is unstaffed, consists of a side platform and an island platform serving two tracks. A passing loop runs along the other side of the island platform. The station building is unstaffed and serves only as a waiting room. A footbridge on the outside of the station premises links to the island platform and to the street on the other side of the tracks, allowing passengers to access the station platforms from streets on either side of the tracks.

== Adjacent stations ==
| « | Service | » |
Yosan Line
| Namikata | Local | Iyo-Kameoka |

== History ==
Japanese Government Railways (JGR) opened the station on 1 December 1924 under the name of Iyo-Ōi (伊予大井). At that time it served as the terminus of the then Sanyo Line which had been extended westwards from Imabari. Iyo-Ōi became a through-station on 21 June 1925 when the line was further extended to Kikuma. On 1 October 1959, the station, now being operated by JGR's successor, Japanese National Railways (JNR), was renamed Ōnishi Station. With the privatization of JNR on 1 April 1987, control of the station passed to JR Shikoku.

== Surrounding area ==
- Myōkensan Kofun is located 15 minutes on foot from the station.
- Imabari City Hall Onishi Branch (former Onishi Town Office)
- Imabari Municipal Onishi Elementary School
- Imabari Municipal Onishi Junior High School

== See also ==
- List of railway stations in Japan
