= Iyo-Hōjō Station =

Railway station in Matsuyama, Ehime Prefecture, Japan

Y48 Iyo-Hōjō Station 伊予北条駅
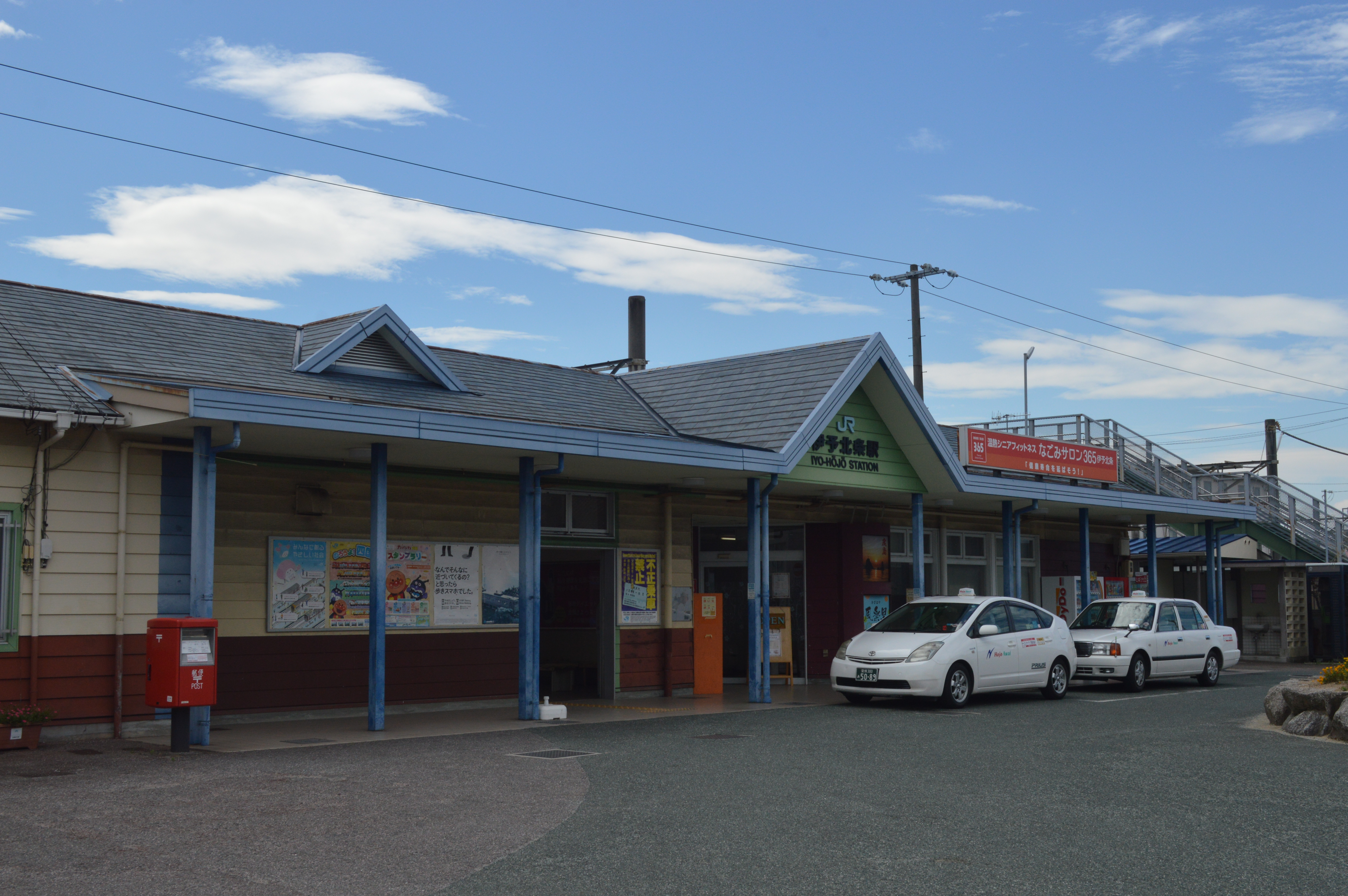
- Iyo-Hōjō Station, August 2021

General information
- Location: 416-5 Hōjōtsuji, Matsuyama-shi, Ehime-ken 799-2430; Japan
- Coordinates: 33.9729°N 132.7756°E
- Operator: JR Shikoku
- Line: ■ Yosan Line
- Distance: 176.9 km from Takamatsu
- Platforms: 1 side + 1 island platform
- Tracks: 3

Construction
- Structure type: At grade
- Parking: Available
- Accessible: No - platforms linked by footbridge

Other information
- Status: Unstaffed
- Station code: Y48

History
- Opened: 28 March 1926; 100 years ago

Passengers
- FY2019: 1152
Location
- Location within Ehime Prefecture Location within Japan

Iyo-Hōjō Station (伊予北条駅, Iyo-Hōjō-eki) is a passenger railway station located in the city of Matsuyama, Ehime Prefecture, Japan. It is operated by JR Shikoku and has the station number "Y48".

== Lines ==
Iyo-Hōjō Station is served by the JR Shikoku Yosan Line and is located 176.9 km from the beginning of the line at Takamatsu. Only Yosan Line local trains stop at the station and they only serve the sector between Iyo-Saijō and Matsuyama. Connections with other local or limited express trains are needed to travel further east or west along the line.

== Layout ==
The station, which is unstaffed, consists of a side platform and an island platform serving two tracks. The track on the side of Platform 1 is the main line track used by through traffic (speed limit 100 km/h), and the track on the side of Platforms 2 and 3 is the secondary main line. In principle, trains in both directions enter Platform 1, unless there is a crossing of an oncoming train, a freight train, or a freight train that departs from or arrives at this station.

== Adjacent stations ==
«	Service	»
Yosan Line
Ōura	-	Yanagihara

== History ==
Iyo-Hōjō Station opened on 28 March 1926 when the then Sanyo Line was extended from Kikuma. At that time the station was operated by Japanese Government Railways, later becoming Japanese National Railways (JNR). With the privatization of JNR on 1 April 1987, control of the station passed to JR Shikoku.

== Surrounding area ==
- Hōjō Port
- Matsuyama City Hall Hojo Branch (former Hōjō City Hall)
- St. Catherine University

== See also ==
- List of railway stations in Japan
