= Mino Station =

Railway station in Mitoyo, Kagawa Prefecture, Japan

Y15 Mino Station みの駅
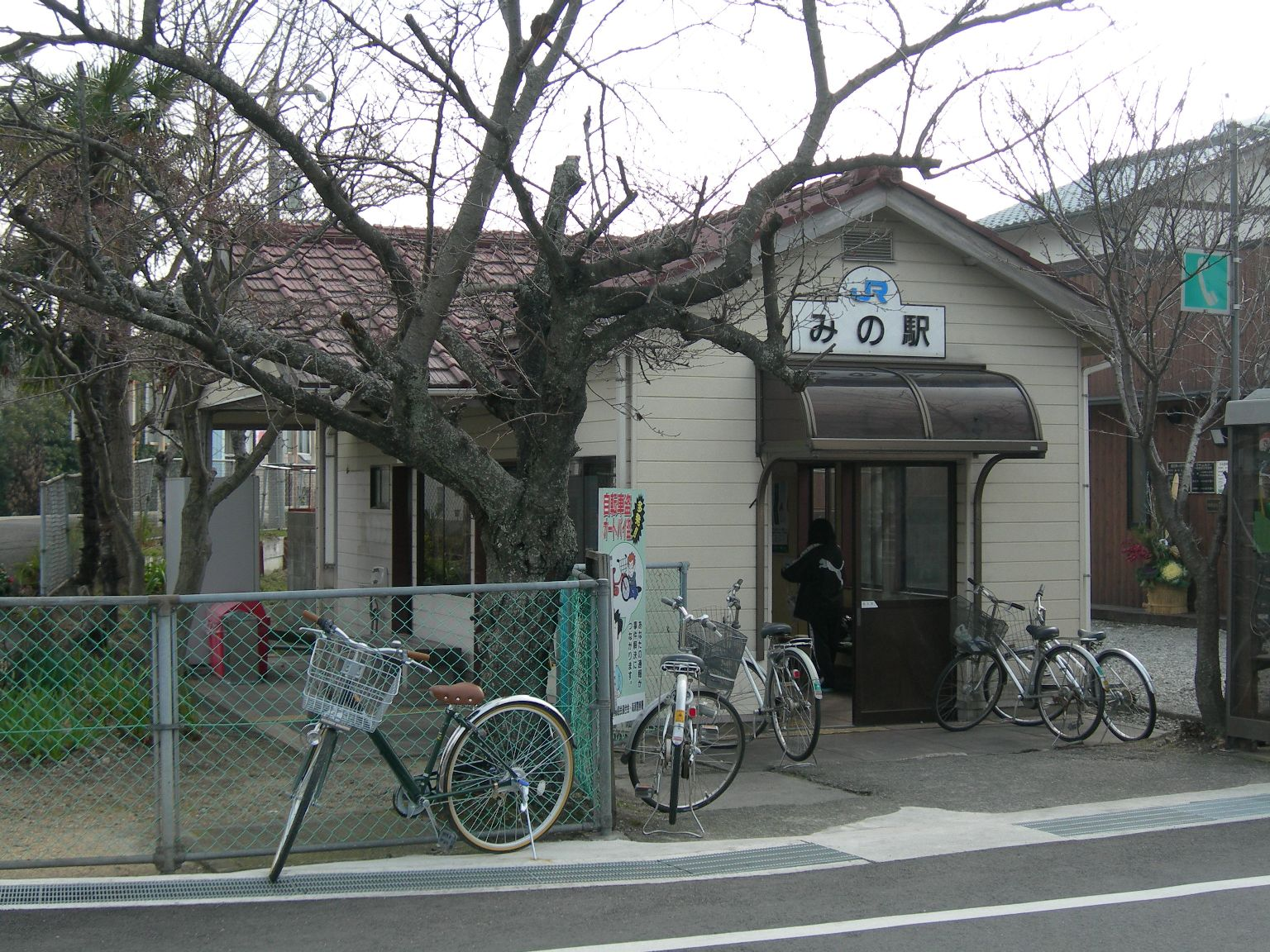
- Mino Station in 2008

General information
- Location: Minocho Shimotakase, Mitoyo-shi, Kagawa-ken 767-0032; Japan
- Coordinates: 34°12′21″N 133°42′38″E
- Operator: JR Shikoku
- Line: ■ Yosan Line
- Distance: 44.5 km from Takamatsu
- Platforms: 1 side platform
- Tracks: 1

Construction
- Structure type: At grade
- Cycle facilities: Bike shed
- Accessible: Yes - ramp leads up to platform

Other information
- Status: Unstaffed
- Station code: Y15

History
- Opened: 27 January 1952

Passengers
- FY2019: 258
Location
- Location within Kagawa Prefecture Location within Japan

Mino Station (みの駅, Mino-eki) is a passenger railway station located in the city of Mitoyo, Kagawa Prefecture, Japan. It is operated by JR Shikoku and has the station number "Y15".

== Lines ==
Mino Station is served by the JR Shikoku Yosan Line and is located 44.5 km from the beginning of the line at Takamatsu. Dosan line local, Rapid Sunport, and Nanpū Relay services stop at the station. In addition, there are two trains a day running a local service on the Seto-Ōhashi Line which stop at the station. These run in one direction only, from Kan'onji to Okayama.

== Layout ==
The station, which is unstaffed, consists of a side platform serving a single track. A small station building houses a waiting room and an automatic ticket vending machine. A ramp leads up to the platform from the waiting room. A bike shed is located nearby.

== Adjacent stations ==
«	Service	»
Yosan Line
Takuma	Rapid Sunport	Takase
Takuma	Nanpū Relay	Takase
Takuma	Local	Takase
Seto-Ōhashi Line
Takase	Local	Takuma

== History ==
Mino Station opened on 27 January 1952 as an additional stop on the existing Yosan Line. At this time the station was named Takase-daibo Station (高瀬大坊駅, Takase-daibo eki) and was operated by Japanese National Railways (JNR). With the privatization of JNR on 1 April 1987, control of the station passed to JR Shikoku. The station was renamed Mino Station on 3 December 1994.

== Surrounding area ==
- Mitoyo Chamber of Commerce and Industry
- Mitoyo City Hall Mino Branch

== See also ==
- List of railway stations in Japan
