= Y20 =

Y20 may refer to:

== Train stations ==
- Ato Station, in Kure, Hiroshima, Japan
- Kasumigaoka Station (Nara), in Ikoma, Nara, Japan
- Kitakagaya Station, in Suminoe-ku, Osaka, Japan
- New Taipei Industrial Park metro station, in Taipei, Taiwan
- Shintomichō Station, in Chūō, Tokyo, Japan
- Toyohama Station, in Kan'onji, Kagawa, Japan

== Other uses ==
- Toyota Dyna (Y20), a light truck
- Xi'an Y-20, a Chinese aircraft
- Youth Bandy World Championship
