= Kaiganji Station =

Railway station in Tadotsu, Kagawa Prefecture, Japan

Y13 Kaiganji Station 海岸寺駅
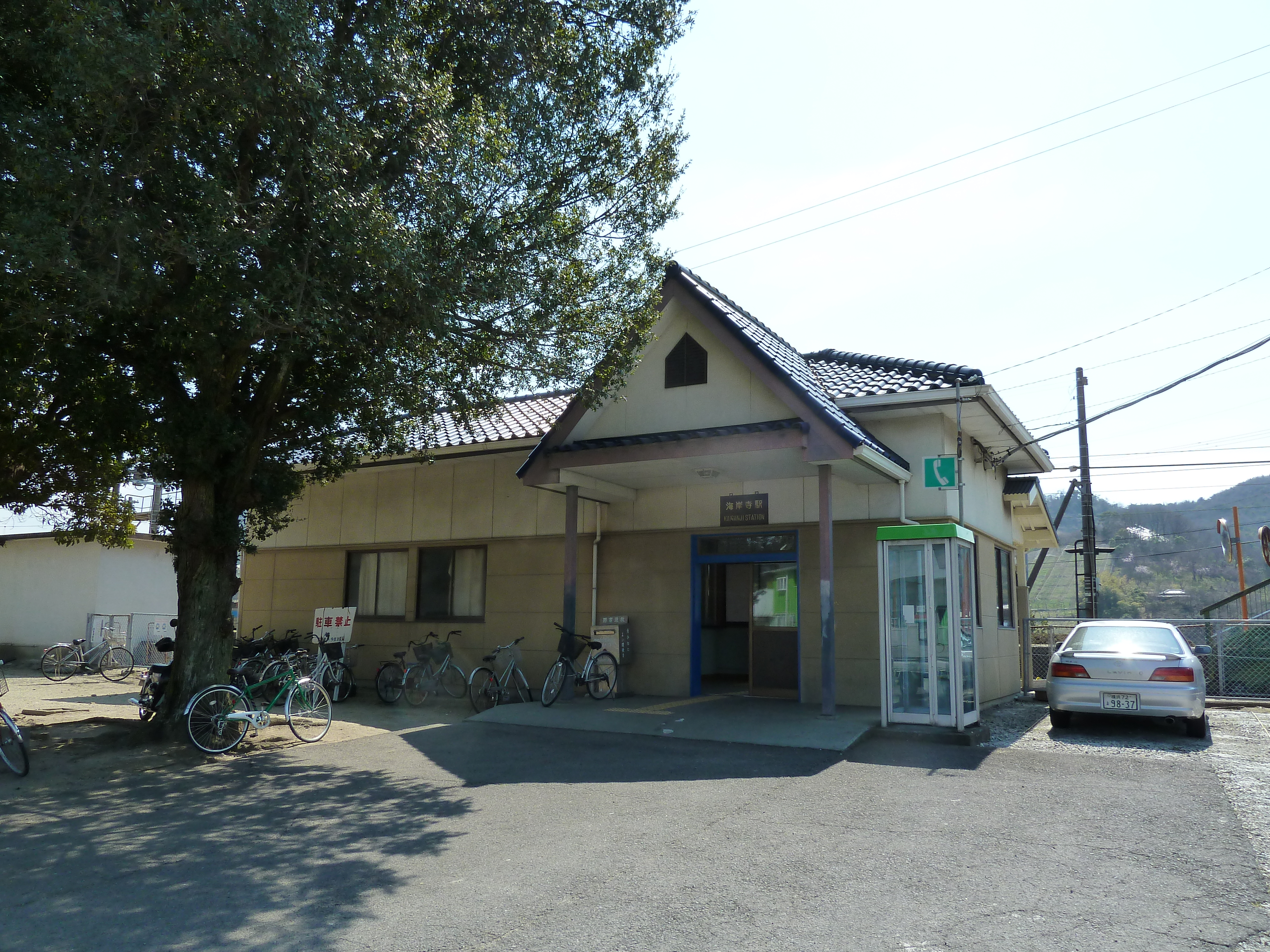
- Kaiganji Station in 2011

General information
- Location: Nishishirakata, Tadotsu, Nakatado-gun, Kagawa-ken 764-0037; Japan
- Coordinates: 34°15′13″N 133°43′47″E
- Operator: JR Shikoku
- Line: ■ Yosan Line
- Distance: 36.5 km from Takamatsu
- Platforms: 1 island platform
- Tracks: 2 + 1 siding

Construction
- Structure type: At grade
- Accessible: No - platforms linked by footbridge

Other information
- Status: Unstaffed
- Station code: Y13

History
- Opened: 20 December 1913

Passengers
- FY2019: 144
Location
- Location within Kagawa Prefecture Location within Japan

Kaiganji Station (海岸寺駅, Kaiganji-eki) is a passenger railway station located in the town of Tadotsu, Nakatado District, Kagawa Prefecture, Japan. It is operated by JR Shikoku and has the station number "Y13".

== Lines ==
Kaiganji Station is served by the JR Shikoku Yosan Line and is located 36.5 km from the beginning of the line at Takamatsu. Dosan line local, Rapid Sunport, and Nanpū Relay services stop at the station. Dosan line local, Rapid Sunport, and Nanpū Relay services stop at the station. In addition, there are two trains a day running a local service on the Seto-Ōhashi Line which stop at the station. These run in one direction only, from Kan'onji to Okayama.

== Layout ==
The station, which is unstaffed, consists of an island platform serving two tracks. A station building serves as a waiting room with an automatic ticket vending machine. Access to the island platform is by means of a footbridge. A siding branches off on the side of platform 1.

== Adjacent stations ==
«	Service	»
Yosan Line
Tadotsu	Local	Tsushimanomiya (when open)
Tadotsu	Local	Takuma
Seto-Ōhashi Line
Takuma	Local	Tadotsu

== History ==
Kaiganji Station opened on 20 December 1913 as an intermediate stop when the track of the then Sanuki Line was extended westwards from Tadotsu to Kan'onji. At that time the station was operated by Japanese Government Railways, later becoming Japanese National Railways (JNR). With the privatization of JNR on 1 April 1987, control of the station passed to JR Shikoku.

== Surrounding area ==
- Kaigan-ji Temple
- Kaiganji Beach

== See also ==
- List of railway stations in Japan
