= Y17 =

Y17 may refer to:

== Train stations ==
- Hanazonochō Station, in Nishinari-ku, Osaka, Japan
- Hijidai Station, in Mitoyo, Kagawa, Japan
- Hiro Station, in Kure, Hiroshima Prefecture, Japan
- Sakuradamon Station, in Chiyoda, Tokyo, Japan
- Toriimae Station, in Ikoma, Nara, Japan
- Xinpu Minsheng metro station, in Taipei, Taiwan

== Other uses ==
- Y-17 Istres/Le Tube Advanced Landing Ground, now Istres-Le Tubé Air Base in France
- Youth Bandy World Championship
