= Minoura Station =

Railway station in Ka'onji, Kagawa Prefecture, Japan

Y21 Minoura Station 箕浦駅
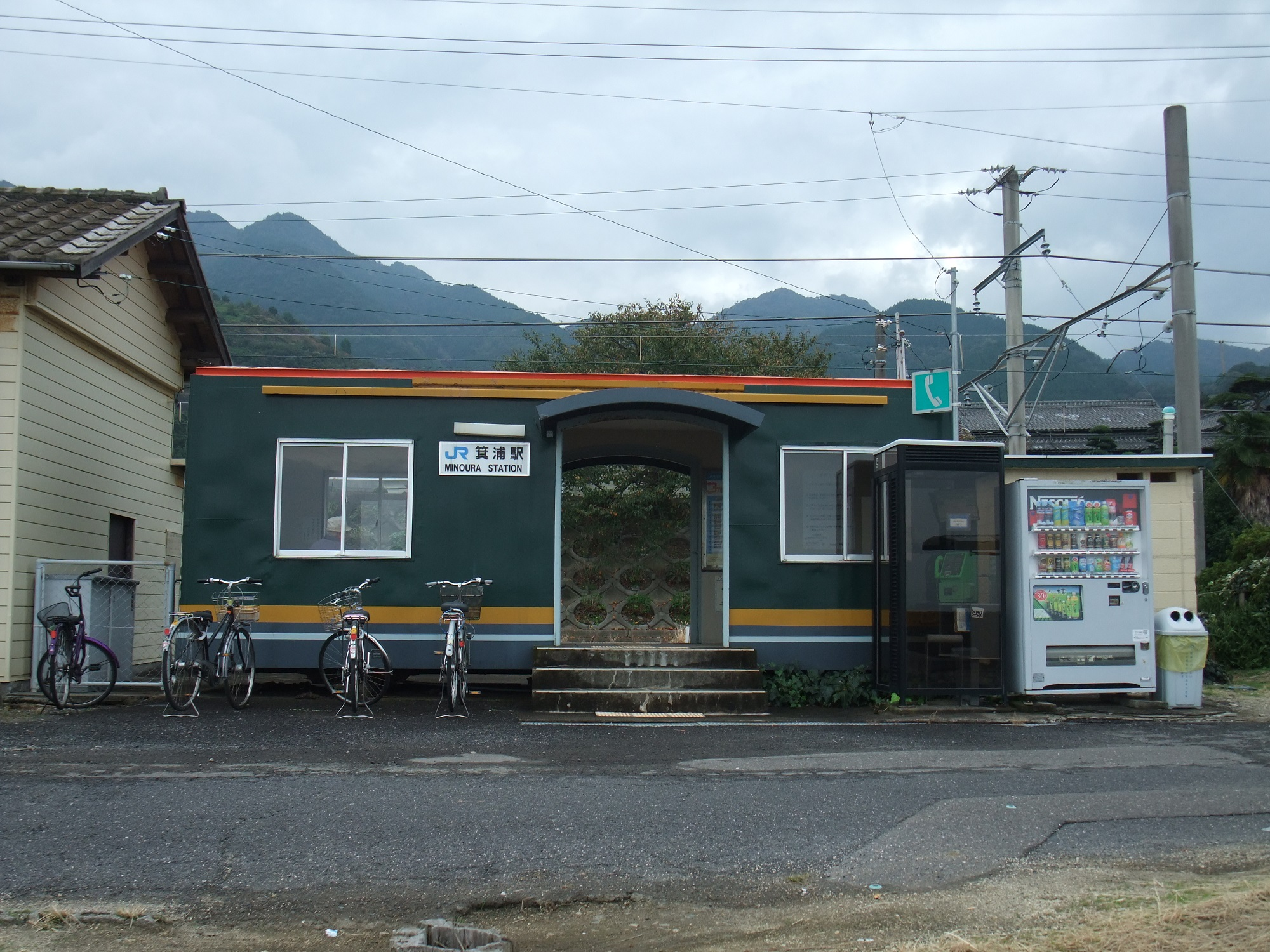
- Minoura Station in 2014

General information
- Location: Toyohamacho Minoura, Kan'onji-shi, Kagawa-ken 769-1604; Japan
- Coordinates: 34°02′53″N 133°37′10″E
- Operator: JR Shikoku
- Line: ■ Yosan Line
- Distance: 66.4 km from Takamatsu
- Platforms: 1 island platform
- Tracks: 2 + 1 siding

Construction
- Structure type: At grade
- Accessible: Partial - access to island platform by level crossing but steps used to enter waiting room

Other information
- Status: Unstaffed
- Station code: Y21

History
- Opened: 1 April 1916

Passengers
- FY2019: 18
Location
- Location within Kagawa Prefecture Location within Japan

Minoura Station (箕浦駅, Minoura-eki) is a passenger railway station located in the city of Kan'onji, Kagawa Prefecture, Japan. It is operated by JR Shikoku and has the station number "Y21".

== Lines ==
Minoura Station is served by the JR Shikoku Yosan Line and is located 66.4 km from the beginning of the line at Takamatsu. Yosan line local, Rapid Sunport, and Nanpū Relay services stop at the station.

== Layout ==
The station, which is unstaffed, consists of an island platform serving two tracks. A waiting room fabricated from a disused freight car has been set up by the tracks. Access to the island platform is by means of a level crossing. There is also a siding on the side of platform/track 1 which terminates in a locomotive shed.

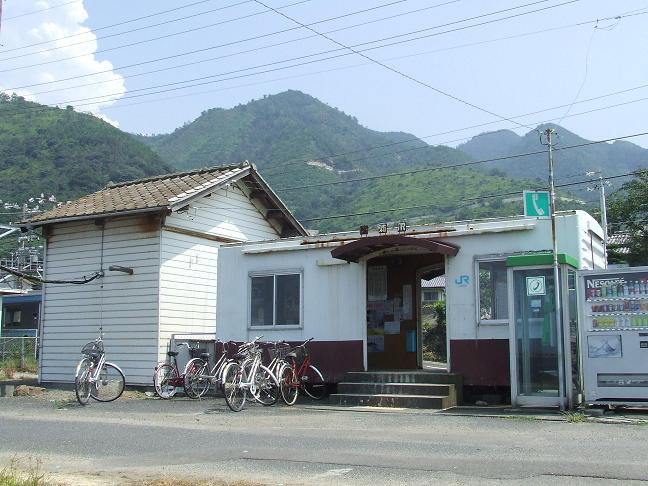
The station waiting room in 2007 with a different colour scheme.

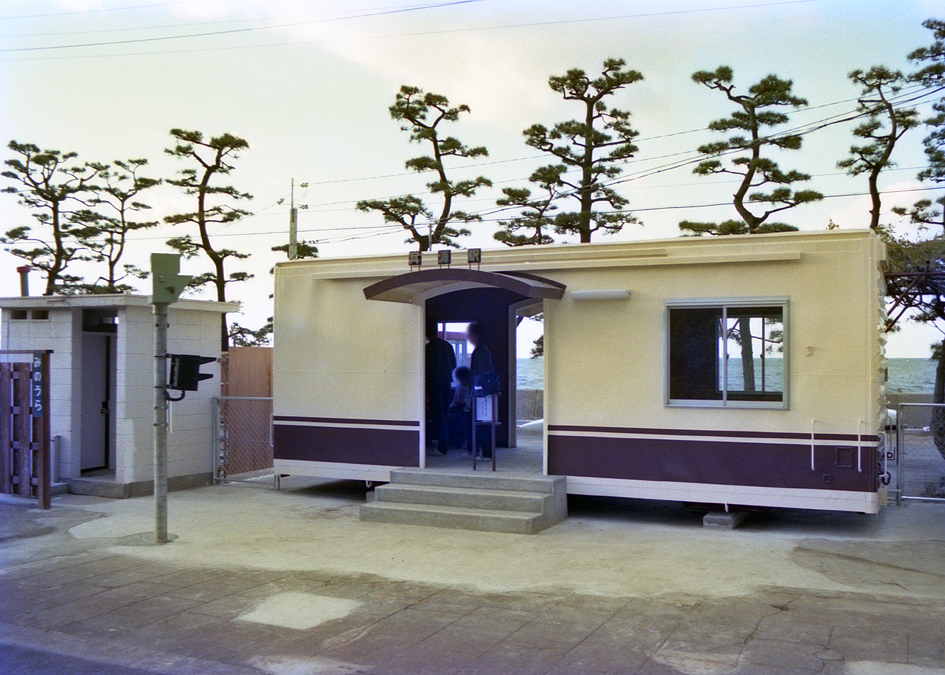
An even earlier picture, from 1984, during the JNR era. This is from the other side, standing by the tracks and looking back at the building. The Seto Inland Sea can be seen beyond.

== Adjacent stations ==
«	Service	»
Yosan Line
Toyohama	Rapid Sunport	Kawanoe
Toyohama	Nanpū Relay	Kawanoe
Toyohama	Local	Kawanoe

== History ==
Minoura Station opened on 1 April 1916 as an intermediate stop when the track of the then Sanuki Line was extended westwards from Kan'onji to Kawanoe. At that time the station was operated by Japanese Government Railways, later becoming Japanese National Railways (JNR). With the privatization of JNR on 1 April 1987, control of the station passed to JR Shikoku.

== Surrounding area ==
- Japan National Route 11

== See also ==
- List of railway stations in Japan
