= Takuma Station =

Railway station in Mitoyo, Kagawa Prefecture, Japan

Y14 Takuma Station 詫間駅
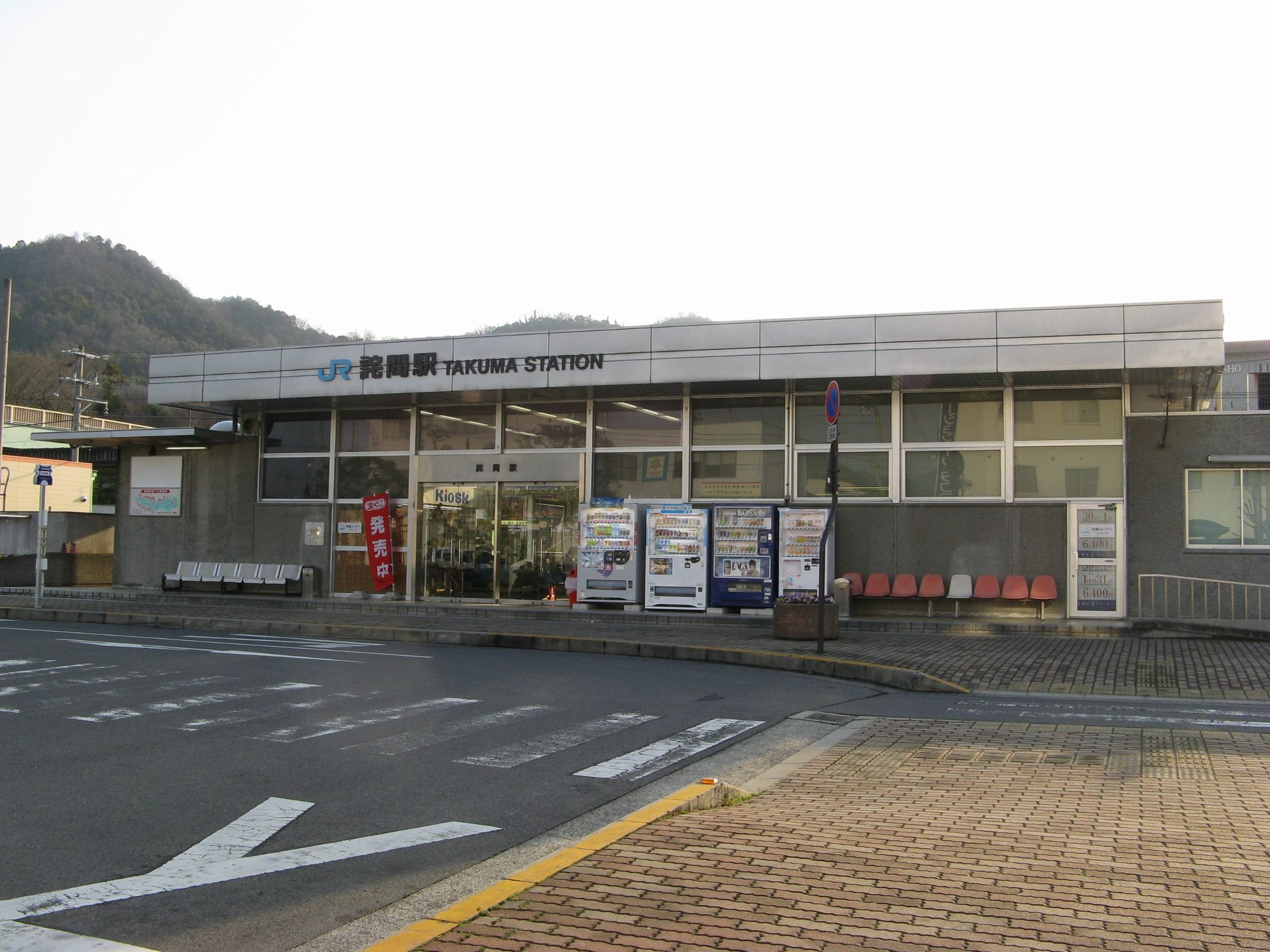
- Takuma Station, March 2008

General information
- Location: Matsusaki, Takuma-chō, Mitoyo-shi, Kagawa-ken 769-1102; Japan
- Coordinates: 34°13′16″N 133°41′34″E
- Operator: JR Shikoku
- Line: ■ Yosan Line
- Distance: 42.0 km from Takamatsu
- Platforms: 1 island platform
- Tracks: 2 + 1 siding + 1 passing loop

Construction
- Structure type: At grade
- Parking: Available

Other information
- Status: Staffed - JR ticket window (Midori no Madoguchi)
- Station code: Y14
- Website: Official website

History
- Opened: 20 December 1913

Passengers
- FY2019: 841
Location
- Location within Kagawa Prefecture Location within Japan

Takuma Station (詫間駅, Takuma-eki) is a passenger railway station located in the city of Mitoyo, Kagawa Prefecture, Japan. It is operated by JR Shikoku and has the station number "Y14".

== Lines ==
Takuma Station is served by the JR Shikoku Yosan Line and is located 42.0 km from the beginning of the line at Takamatsu. Yosan line local, Rapid Sunport, and Nanpū Relay services stop at the station. In addition, there are two trains a day running a local service on the Seto-Ōhashi Line which stop at the station. These run in one direction only, from Kan'onji to Okayama.

The following JR Shikoku limited express services also stop at the station:

- Shiokaze - from Okayama to Matsuyama and Uwajima
- Ishizuchi - from Matsuyama to Takamatsu and Uwajima
- Midnight Express Takamatsu - from Takamatsu to Iyo-Saijo
- Morning Express Takamatsu - from Iyo-Saijo to Takamatsu

== Layout ==
The station consists of an island platform serving two tracks. A station building houses a waiting room, kiosk and a JR ticket window (with a Midori no Madoguchi facility). Access to the island platform is by means of a level crossing. Parking is available outside the station. A siding branches off on the side of platform/track 1 and there is a passing loop beyond platform/track 2.

== Adjacent stations ==
«	Service	»
JR Limited Express Services
Tadotsu	Shiokaze	Takase
Tadotsu	Ishizuchi	Takase
Tadotsu	Midnight Express Takamatsu	Takase
Tadotsu	Morning Express Takamatsu	Takase
Yosan Line
Kaiganji	Rapid Sunport	Mino
Kaiganji	Nanpū Relay	Mino
Tsushimanomiya (when open)	Local	Mino
Kaiganji	Local	Mino
Seto-Ōhashi Line
Mino	Local	Kaiganji

== History ==
Takuma Station opened on 20 December 1913 as an intermediate stop when the track of the then Sanuki Line was extended westwards from Tadotsu to Kan'onji. At that time the station was operated by Japanese Government Railways, later becoming Japanese National Railways (JNR). With the privatization of JNR on 1 April 1987, control of the station passed to JR Shikoku.

== Surrounding area ==
- Takuma Port
- Mitoyo Municipal Matsuzaki Elementary School

== See also ==
- List of railway stations in Japan
