= Hijidai Station =

Railway station in Mitoyo, Kagawa Prefecture, Japan

Y17 Hijidai Station 比地大駅
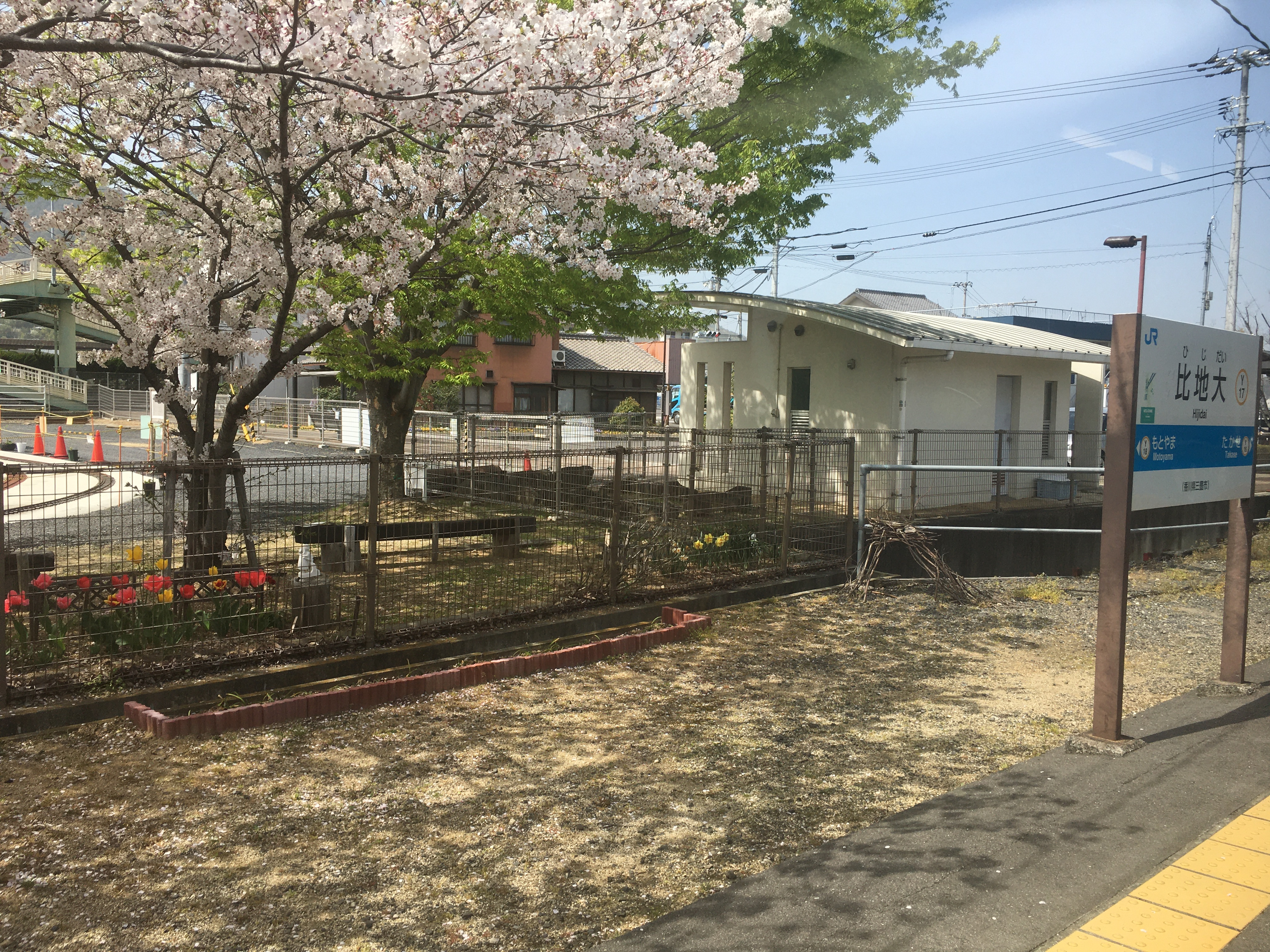
- Hijidai Station, March 2021

General information
- Location: Toyonakacho Hijidai, Mitoyo-shi, Kagawa-ken 769-1501; Japan
- Coordinates: 34°10′00″N 133°41′24″E
- Operator: JR Shikoku
- Line: ■ Yosan Line
- Distance: 50.0 km from Takamatsu
- Platforms: 1 side platform
- Tracks: 1
- Connections: Bus stop

Construction
- Structure type: At grade
- Cycle facilities: Bike shed
- Accessible: Yes - ramp leads up to platform

Other information
- Status: Unstaffed
- Station code: Y17

History
- Opened: 1 October 1957

Passengers
- FY2019: 120
Location
- Location within Kagawa Prefecture Location within Japan

Hijidai Station (比地大駅, Hijidai-eki) is a passenger railway station located in then city of Mitoyo, Kagawa Prefecture, Japan. It is operated by JR Shikoku and has the station number "Y17".

== Lines ==
Hijidai Station is served by the JR Shikoku Yosan Line and is located 50.0 km from the beginning of the line at Takamatsu. Local, Rapid Sunport, and Nanpū Relay services stop at the station. Dosan line local, Rapid Sunport, and Nanpū Relay services stop at the station. In addition, there are two trains a day running a local service on the Seto-Ōhashi Line which stop at the station. These run in one direction only, from Kan'onji to Okayama.

== Layout ==
The station, which is unstaffed, consists of a side platform serving a single track. There is no station building, only a shelter on the platform. A ramp leads up to the platform from the access road. A bike shed is positioned nearby as is a municipal public toilet.

== Adjacent stations ==
«	Service	»
Yosan Line
Takase	Rapid Sunport	Motoyama
Takase	Nanpū Relay	Motoyama
Takase	Local	Motoyama
Seto-Ōhashi Line
Motoyama	Local	Takase

== History ==
Hijidai Station was opened by Japanese National Railways (JNR) on 1 October 1957 as an additional stop on the existing Yosan Line. With the privatization of JNR on 1 April 1987, control of the station passed to JR Shikoku.

== Surrounding area ==
- K Train World - Railway Museum
- Mitoyo Municipal Hiji Elementary School

== See also ==
- List of railway stations in Japan
