= Tsushimanomiya Station =

Railway station in Mitoyo, Kagawa Prefecture, Japan

Tsushimanomiya Station 津島ノ宮駅
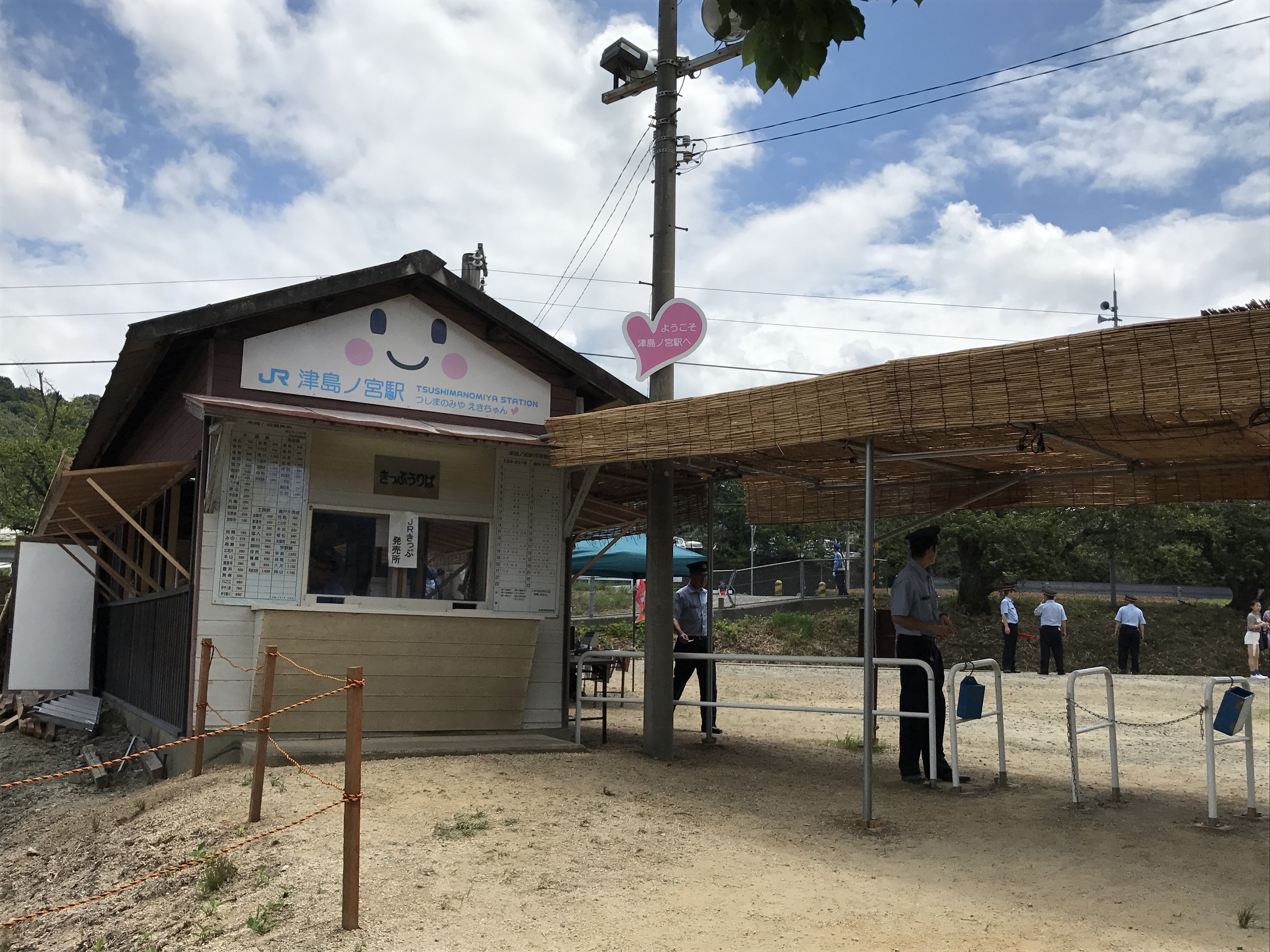
- Tsushimanomiya Station in August 2017

General information
- Location: Mitoyo, Kagawa Prefecture; Japan
- Coordinates: 34.2381°N 133.7043°E
- Operator: JR Shikoku
- Line: ■ Yosan Line
- Distance: 39.8 km from Takamatsu
- Platforms: 1 side platform
- Tracks: 1

History
- Opened: 7 May 1915
Location
- Location within Kagawa Prefecture Location within Japan

Tsushimanomiya Station (津島ノ宮駅, Tsushimanomiya-eki) is a passenger railway station located in the city of Mitoyo, Kagawa Prefecture, Japan, operated by Shikoku Railway Company (JR Shikoku). Tsushimanomiya Station is a seasonal station, which opens on August 4 and 5 only, coinciding with the nearby Tsushima Shrine (Kagawa) Great Summer Festival. Among seasonal stations this station has the shortest number of operating days per year in Japan.

== Lines ==
Tsushimanomiya Station is served by the Yosan Line and is 39.8 kilometers from the starting point of the line at Takamatsu.

== Adjacent stations ==
«	Service	»
Yosan Line
Kaiganji	-	Takuma

== History ==
Tsushimanomiya Station opened on 7 May 1915. With the privatization of Japanese National Railways (JNR) on 1 April 1987, the station came under the control of JR Shikoku.

== Surrounding area ==
- Tsushima Shrine (Kagawa)

== See also ==
- List of railway stations in Japan
