= Motoyama Station (Mitoyo) =

Railway station in Mitoyo, Kagawa Prefecture, Japan

Y18 Motoyama Station 本山駅
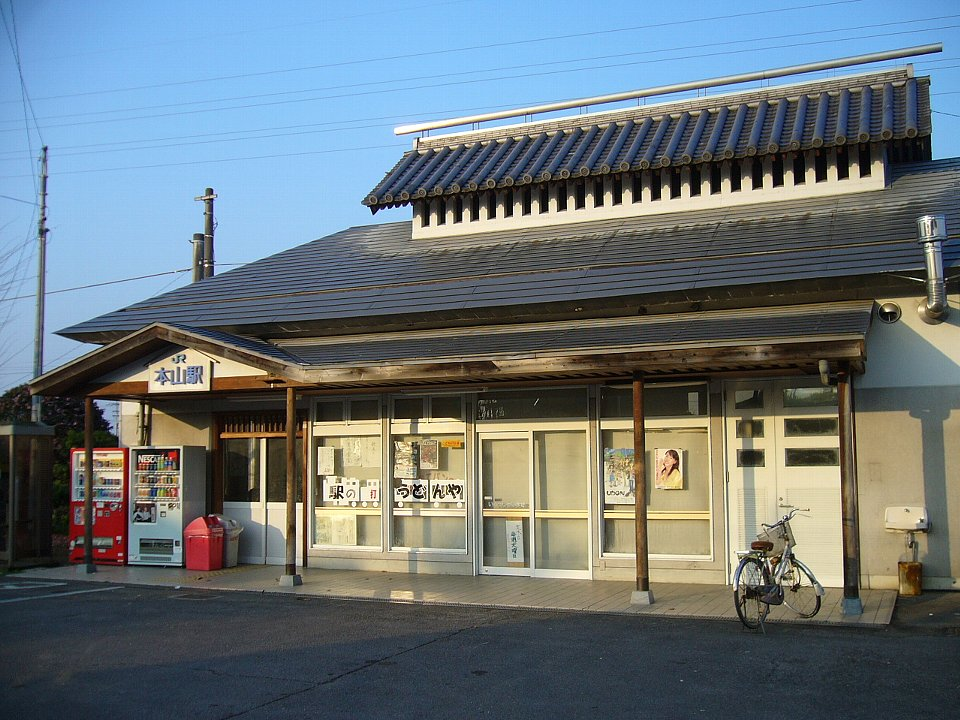
- Motoyama Station, December 2006

General information
- Location: Toyonakacho Okamoto, Mitoyo-shi, Kagawa-ken 769-1507; Japan
- Coordinates: 34°08′46″N 133°41′11″E
- Operator: JR Shikoku
- Line: ■ Yosan Line
- Distance: 52.4 km from Takamatsu
- Platforms: 1 island platform
- Tracks: 2 + 1 siding

Construction
- Structure type: At grade

Other information
- Status: Unstaffed
- Station code: Y18

History
- Opened: 20 December 1913

Passengers
- FY2019: 268
Location
- Location within Kagawa Prefecture Location within Japan

Motoyama Station (本山駅, Motoyama-eki) is a passenger railway station located in the city of Mitoyo, Kagawa Prefecture, Japan. It is operated by JR Shikoku and has the station number "Y18".

== Lines ==
Motoyama Station is served by the JR Shikoku Yosan Line and is located 52.4 km from the beginning of the line at Takamatsu. Dosan line local, Rapid Sunport, and Nanpū Relay services stop at the station. In addition, there are two trains a day running a local service on the Seto-Ōhashi Line which stop at the station. These run in one direction only, from Kan'onji to Okayama.

== Layout ==
The station, which is unstaffed, consists of an island platform serving two tracks. A traditional Japanese style timber station building houses a waiting room and a noodle shop. Access to the platforms is by means of a level crossing.

== Adjacent stations ==
«	Service	»
Yosan Line
Hijidai	Rapid Sunport	Kan'onji
Hijidai	Nanpū Relay	Kan'onji
Hijidai	Local	Kan'onji
Seto-Ōhashi Line
Hijidai	Local	Kan'onji

== History ==
The station opened on 20 December 1913 as an intermediate stop when the track of the then Sanuki Line was extended westwards from Tadotsu to Kan'onji. At that time the station was operated by Japanese Government Railways, later becoming Japanese National Railways (JNR). With the privatization of JNR on 1 April 1987, control of the station passed to JR Shikoku.

== Surrounding area ==
- Motoyama-ji, 70th temple of the Shikoku Pilgrimage
- Mitoyo City Hall Toyonaka Government Building (former Toyonaka Town Hall)
- Kagawa Prefectural Kasada High School

== See also ==
- List of railway stations in Japan
