= Takase Station (Kagawa) =

Railway station in Mitoyo, Kagawa Prefecture, Japan

Y16 Takase Station 高瀬駅
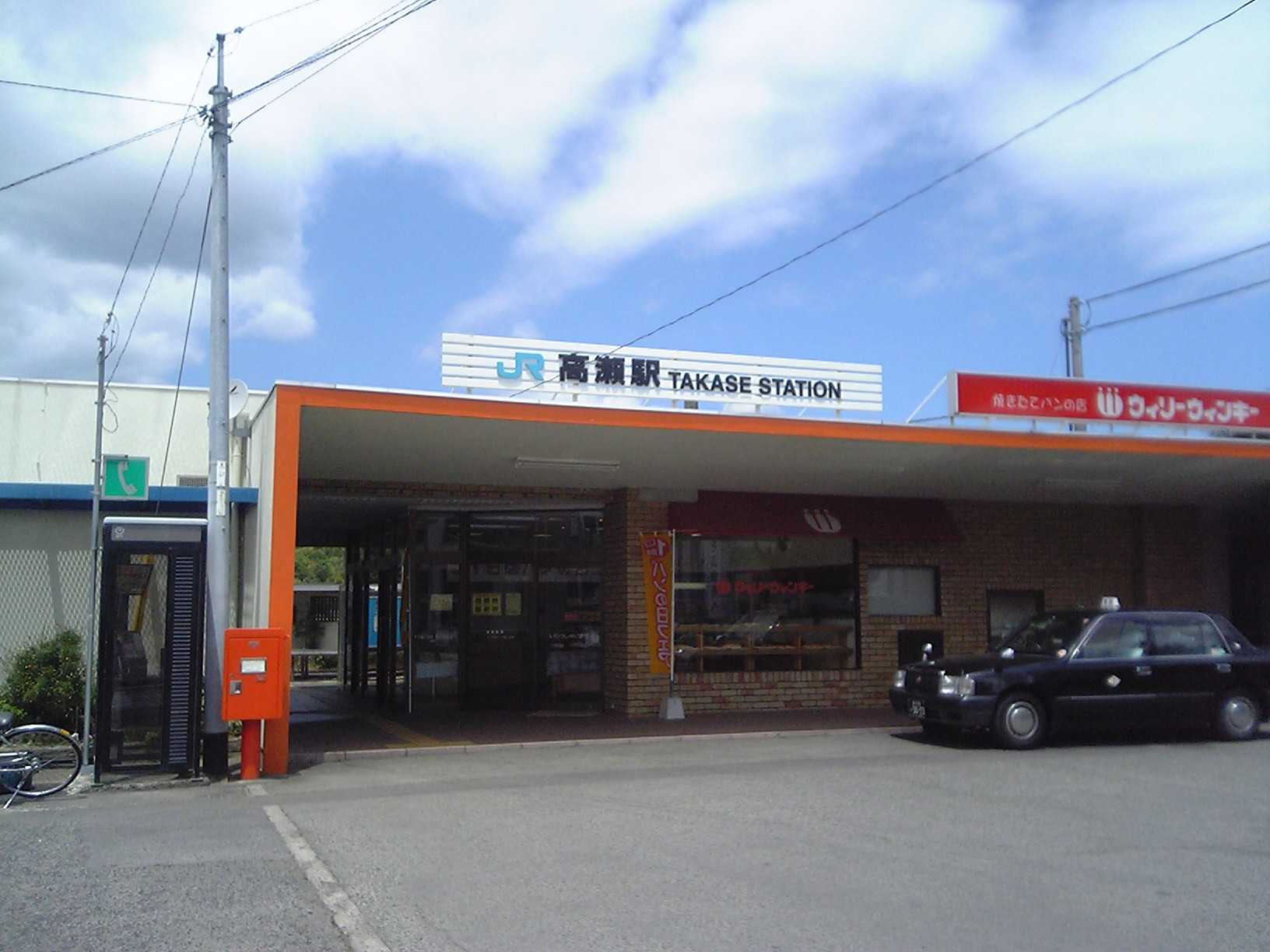
- Takase Station, May 2007

General information
- Location: Shinmyō, Takasechō, Mitoyo-shi, Kagawa-ken 767-0002; Japan
- Coordinates: 34°11′03″N 133°42′41″E
- Operator: JR Shikoku
- Line: ■ Yosan Line
- Distance: 47.0 km from Takamatsu
- Platforms: 1 island platform
- Tracks: 2 + 2 sidings

Construction
- Structure type: At grade
- Parking: Available
- Accessible: No - footbridge needed to access island platform

Other information
- Status: Staffed - JR ticket window (no Midori no Madoguchi)
- Station code: Y16

History
- Opened: 20 December 1913
- Former names: Kamitakase (to 1959)

Passengers
- FY2019: 632
Location
- Location within Kagawa Prefecture Location within Japan

Takase Station (高瀬駅, Takase-eki) is a passenger railway station located in the city of Mitoyo, Kagawa Prefecture, Japan. It is operated by JR Shikoku and has the station number "Y16".

== Lines ==
Takase Station is served by the JR Shikoku Yosan Line and is located 47.0 km from the beginning of the line at Takamatsu. Dosan line local, Rapid Sunport, and Nanpū Relay services stop at the station. In addition, there are two trains a day running a local service on the Seto-Ōhashi Line which stop at the station. These run in one direction only, from Kan'onji to Okayama.

The following JR Shikoku limited express services also stop at the station:

- Shiokaze - from Okayama to Matsuyama and Uwajima
- Ishizuchi - from Matsuyama to Takamatsu and Uwajima
- Midnight Express Takamatsu - from Takamatsu to Iyo-Saijo
- Morning Express Takamatsu - from Iyo-Saijo to Takamatsu

== Layout ==
The station consists of an island platform serving two tracks. A station building houses a waiting room and a JR ticket window (but without a Midori no Madoguchi facility). Access to the island platform is by means of a footbridge. Parking is available outside the station. Two sidings branch off the tracks on either side of the island platform.

== Adjacent stations ==
«	Service	»
JR Limited Express Services
Takuma	Shiokaze	Kan'onji
Takuma	Ishizuchi	Kan'onji
Takuma	Midnight Express Takamatsu	Kan'onji
Takuma	Morning Express Takamatsu	Kan'onji
Yosan Line
Mino	Rapid Sunport	Hijidai
Mino	Nanpū Relay	Hijidai
Mino	Local	Hijidai
Seto-Ōhashi Line
Hijidai	Local	Mino

== History ==
Takase Station opened on 20 December 1913 as an intermediate stop when the track of the then Sanuki Line was extended westwards from Tadotsu to Kan'onji. At that time the station was named Kamitakase Station (上高瀬駅, Kamitakase-eki) and was operated by Japanese Government Railways, later becoming Japanese National Railways (JNR). The station was renamed Takase Station on 1 October 1959. With the privatization of JNR on 1 April 1987, control of the station passed to JR Shikoku.

== Surrounding area ==
- Japan National Route 11
- Mitoyo City Hall
- Kagawa Prefectural Takase High School
- Shikoku Gakuin University Kagawa Nishi High School

== See also ==
- List of railway stations in Japan
