= Toyohama Station =

Railway station in Ka'onji, Kagawa Prefecture, Japan

Y20 Toyohama Station 豊浜駅
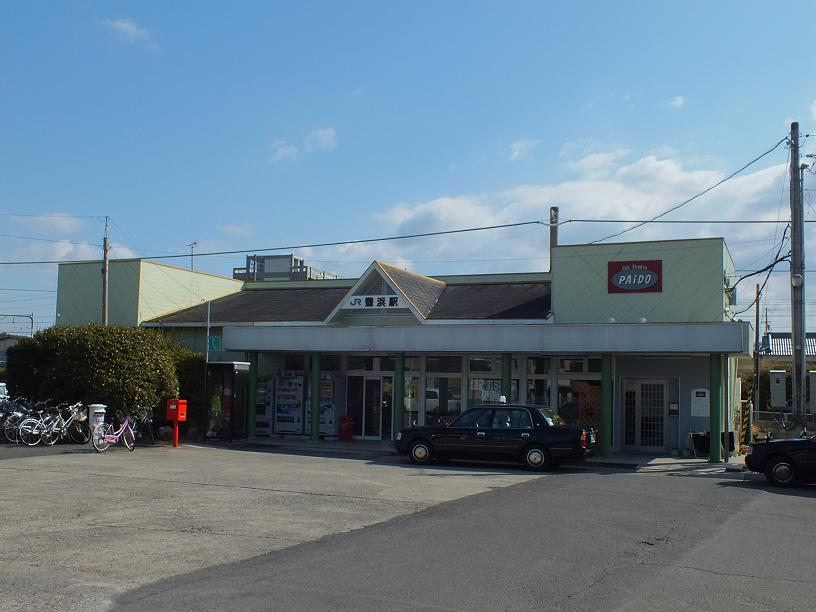
- Toyohama Station in 2013

General information
- Location: Toyohamacho Himehama, Kan'onji-shi, Kagawa-ken 769-1601; Japan
- Coordinates: 34°04′50″N 133°38′41″E
- Operator: JR Shikoku
- Line: ■ Yosan Line
- Distance: 62.0 km from Takamatsu
- Platforms: 1 island platform
- Tracks: 2 + 1 siding

Construction
- Structure type: At grade
- Accessible: Yes - access to island platform by a level crossing

Other information
- Status: Unstaffed
- Station code: Y20

History
- Opened: 1 April 1916

Passengers
- FY2019: 237
Location
- Location within Kagawa Prefecture Location within Japan

Toyohama Station (豊浜駅, Toyohama-eki) is a passenger railway station located in the city of Kan'onji, Kagawa Prefecture, Japan. It is operated by JR Shikoku and has the station number "Y20".

== Lines ==
Toyohama Station is served by the JR Shikoku Yosan Line and is located 62.0 km from the beginning of the line at Takamatsu. Dosan line local, Rapid Sunport, and Nanpū Relay services stop at the station.

== Layout ==
The station, which is unstaffed, consists of an island platform serving two tracks. A station building by the side of the tracks serves as a waiting room. Access to the island platform is by means of a level crossing. There is also a siding on the side of platform/track 1.

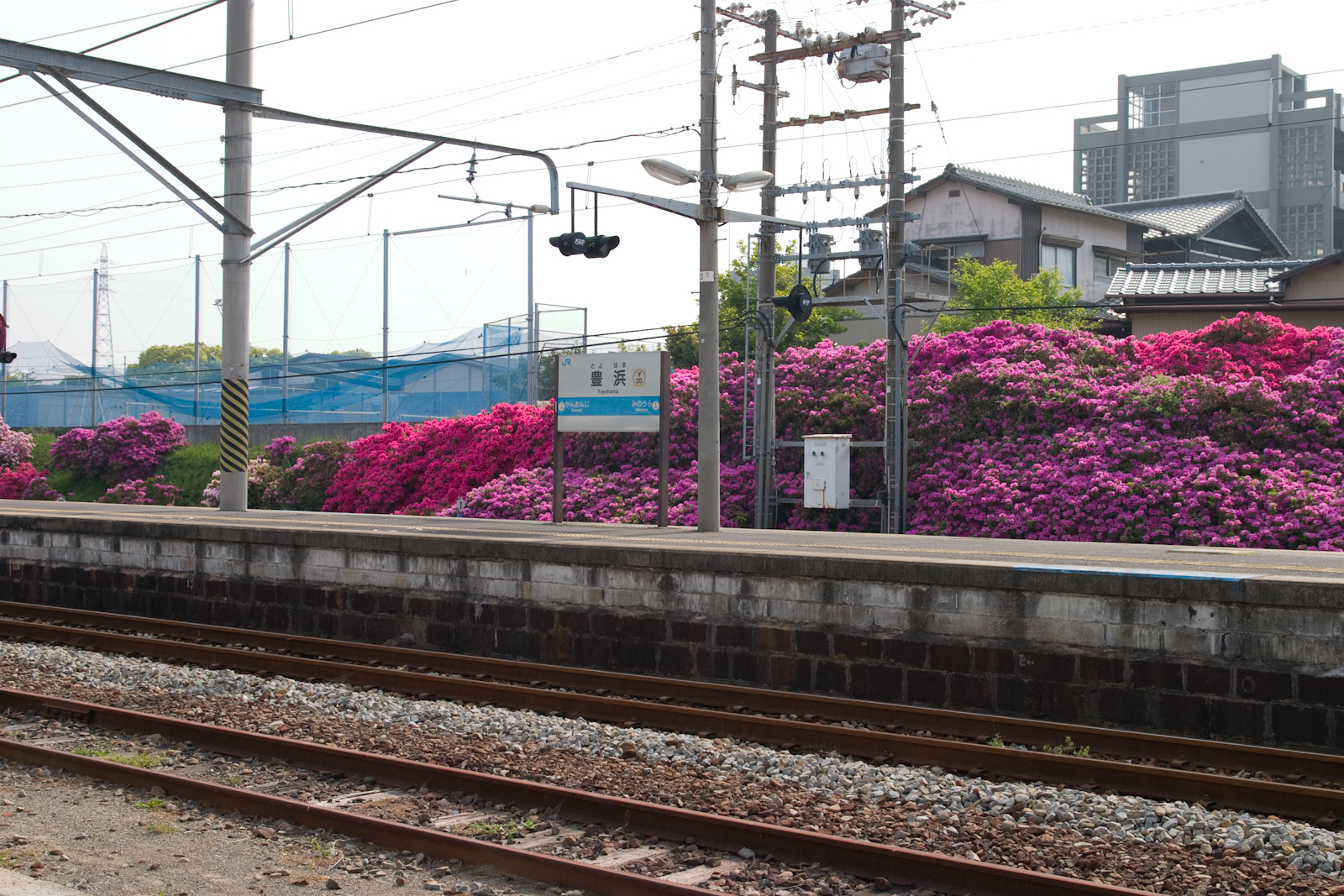
The island platform on the side of platform 1. The track in the foreground is the siding.

== Adjacent stations ==
«	Service	»
Yosan Line
Kan'onji	Rapid Sunport	Minoura
Kan'onji	Nanpū Relay	Minoura
Kan'onji	Local	Minoura

== History ==
Toyohama Station opened on 1 April 1916 as an intermediate stop when the track of the then Sanuki Line was extended westwards from Kan'onji to Kawanoe. At that time the station was operated by Japanese Government Railways, later becoming Japanese National Railways (JNR). With the privatization of JNR on 1 April 1987, control of the station passed to JR Shikoku.

== Surrounding area ==
- Kanonji Municipal Toyohama Junior High School
- Mitoyo General Hospital

== See also ==
- List of railway stations in Japan
