= Kan'onji Station =

Railway station in Ka'onji, Kagawa Prefecture, Japan

Y19 Kan'onji Station 観音寺駅
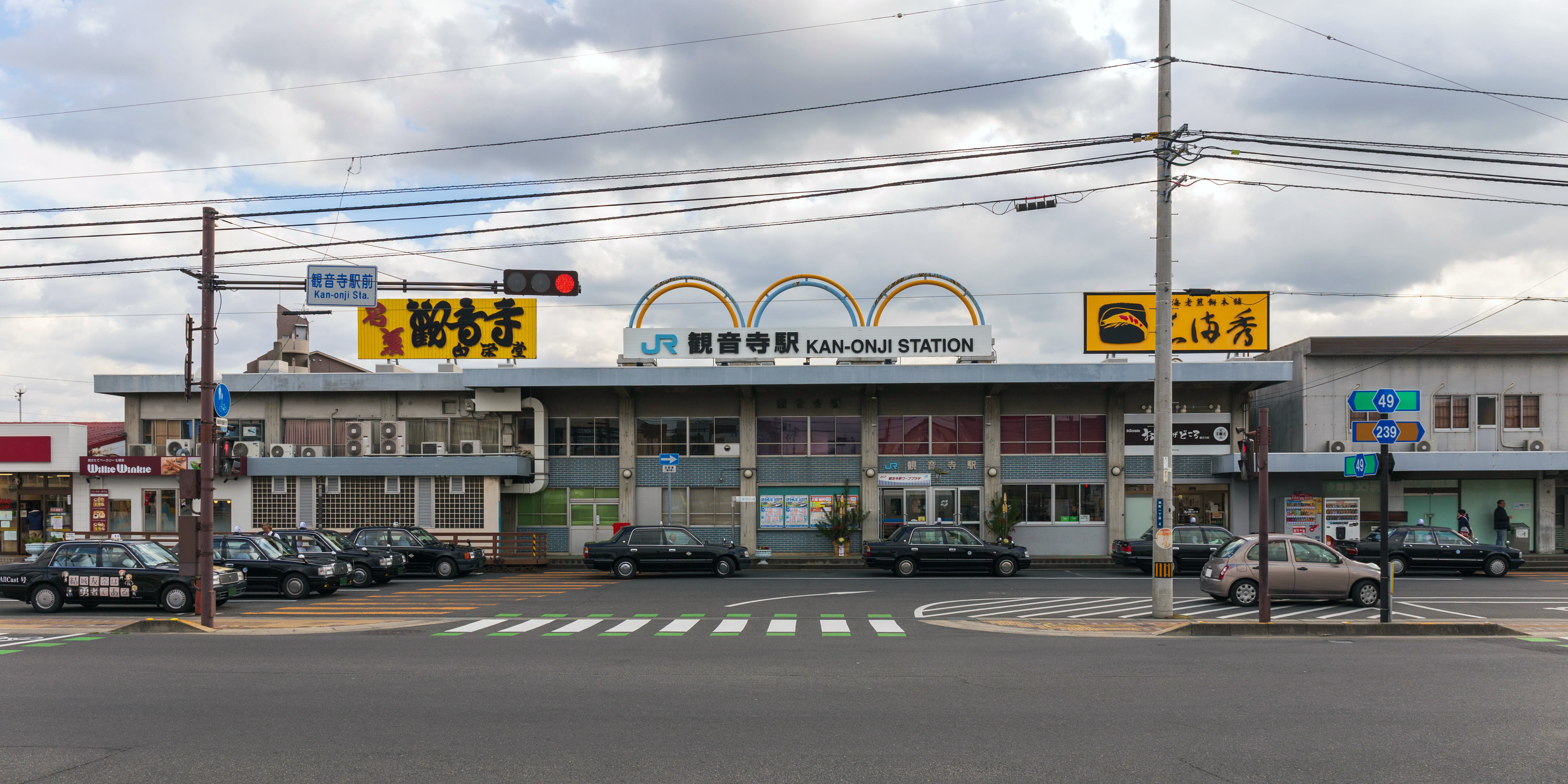
- Kan'onji Station in 2018

General information
- Location: 1-4 Sakaemachi, Kanonji-shi, Kagawa-ken 768-0072; Japan
- Coordinates: 34°07′28″N 133°39′21″E
- Operator: JR Shikoku
- Line: ■ Yosan Line
- Distance: 56.5 km from Takamatsu
- Platforms: 2 side + 1 island platforms
- Tracks: 4 + 2 sidings

Construction
- Structure type: At grade
- Parking: Available

Other information
- Status: Staffed - (Midori no Madoguchi)
- Station code: Y19
- Website: Official website

History
- Opened: 20 December 1913

Passengers
- FY2023: 1410
Location
- Location within Kagawa Prefecture Location within Japan

Kan'onji Station (観音寺駅, Kan'onji-eki) is a passenger railway station located in the city of Kan'onji, Kagawa, Kagawa Prefecture, Japan. It is operated by JR Shikoku and has the station number "Y19".

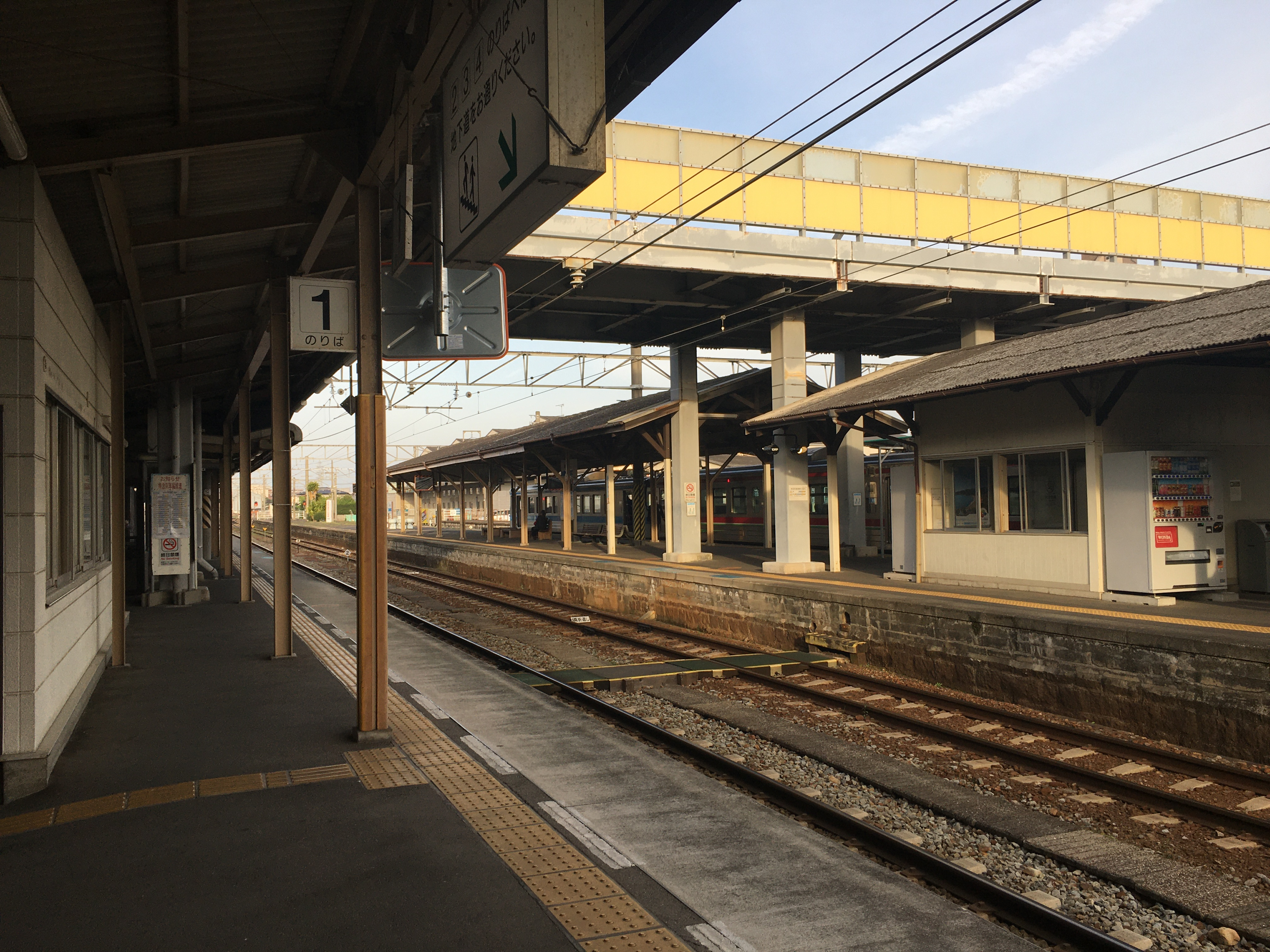
Platforms, 2021

== Lines ==
Kan'onji Station is served by the JR Shikoku Yosan Line and is located 56.5 km from the beginning of the line at Takamatsu. Yosan line local, Rapid Sunport, and Nanpū Relay services stop at the station. In addition, there are two trains a day running a local service on the Seto-Ōhashi Line which start from the station for Okayama.

The following JR Shikoku limited express services also stop at the station:

- Shiokaze - from Okayama to Matsuyama and Uwajima
- Ishizuchi - from Matsuyama to Takamatsu and Uwajima
- Midnight Express Takamatsu - from Takamatsu to Iyo-Saijo
- Morning Express Takamatsu - from Iyo-Saijo to Takamatsu

== Layout ==
The station consists of two side platforms and one island platforms serving four tracks. A station building houses a waiting room, shops, a JR Midori no Madoguchi staffed ticket office and a JR Travel Centre (Warp Plaza). Platform 1 is accessed directly through the ticket gate from the station building. Platforms 2 and 3 (island) and platform 4 (side) are accessed by means of an underpass. Parking and car rental are available. Two sidings branch off the main tracks.

== Adjacent stations ==
«	Service	»
JR Limited Express Services
Takase	Shiokaze	Kawanoe
Takase	Ishizuchi	Kawanoe
Takase	Midnight Express Takamatsu	Kawanoe
Takase	Morning Express Takamatsu	Kawanoe
Yosan Line
Motoyama	Rapid Sunport	Toyohama
Motoyama	Nanpū Relay	Toyohama
Motoyama	Local	Toyohama
Seto-Ōhashi Line
Terminus	Local	Motoyama

== History ==
Kan'onji Station opened on 20 December 1913 as the terminus of the then Sanuki Line which had been extended westwards from Tadotsu. It became a through-station on 1 April 1916 when the line was further extended to Kawanoe. At that time the station was operated by Japanese Government Railways, later becoming Japanese National Railways (JNR). With the privatization of JNR on 1 April 1987, control of the station passed to JR Shikoku.

== Surrounding area ==
- Kanonji City Hall
- Kanonji Civic Hall
- Kanonji City Central Library
- Kagawa Prefectural Kanonji General High School
- Kagawa Prefectural Kannonji First High School

== See also ==
- List of railway stations in Japan
